= Threat (disambiguation) =

A threat is an act of coercion.

Threat may also refer to:

== Common uses ==
- Threat (computer), a possible danger that might exploit a vulnerability to breach security
- Intimidation
- Threat display, a behaviour aiming at intimidation of a potential enemy
- Threat of force (public international law), an act of coercion between nations

== Arts, entertainment, and media ==
=== Films ===
- Threat (film), a 2006 American film by Matt Pizzolo
- The Threat (1949 film), an American film noir directed by Felix E. Feist
- The Threat (1960 film), an American crime film
- The Threat (1966 film), a Japanese black-and-white film

=== Literature ===
- The Threat (memoir), a 2019 memoir by Andrew McCabe
- The Threat (novel), a 1998 novel by K.A. Applegate

=== Other uses in arts, entertainment, and media ===
- "The Threat" (Dynasty), an episode of the TV series Dynasty
- Threats (Shadowrun), a 1996 supplement for the role-playing game Shadowrun
- "Threat", a song by Jay-Z from The Black Album

== See also ==
- Threatin, an American rock band accused of being fake and a vanity project
- Triple threat (disambiguation)
