= Associate Deputy Director of the Federal Bureau of Investigation =

Senior position in the FBI

- Seal of the FBI

- Flag of the FBI
- Incumbent; B. Chad Yarbrough since December 9, 2025
- Federal Bureau of Investigation
- Reports to: Deputy Director of the Federal Bureau of Investigation
- Appointer: Director of the Federal Bureau of Investigation
- Term length: No fixed term

The associate deputy director of the Federal Bureau of Investigation is a senior United States government position in the Federal Bureau of Investigation. The office is third in command to the director of the Federal Bureau of Investigation. If the deputy director is absent or the position is vacant, the associate deputy director automatically takes on the additional title and role of acting deputy director. The office is the second highest position attainable within the FBI without being appointed by the president of the United States. Responsibilities as associate deputy director include assisting the deputy director and director, and leading prominent investigations. From 1978 to 1987, the positions of deputy director and associate deputy director were not filled due to William Hedgcock Webster's decision to divide the positions responsibilities between three positions.

== Associate deputy directors ==
| Portrait | Associate deputy director | Term | |
| Portrait | Associate deputy director | Start | End |
|---|---|---|---|
| | Deke DeLoach | July 10, 1963 | July 9, 1970 |
| | Joseph L. Ford | July 26, 2006 | January 23, 2008 |
| | Timothy P. Murphy | January 23, 2008 | July 8, 2010 |
| | Thomas J. Harrington | August 13, 2010 | June 22, 2012 |
| | Kevin Perkins | June 22, 2012 | July 30, 2015 |
| | Andrew McCabe | July 30, 2015 | February 1, 2016 |
| | David Bowdich | February 1, 2016 | April 13, 2018 |
| | Paul Abbate | April 13, 2018 | February 1, 2021 |
| | Jeffrey S. Sallet | February 1, 2021 | May 23, 2022 |
| | Brian C. Turner | May 23, 2022 | January 20, 2025 |
| | Timothy M. Dunham; Acting | January 20, 2025 | April 2025 |
| | J. William Rivers | April 2025 | After December 9, 2025 |
| | B. Chad Yarbrough | After December 9, 2025 | Incumbent |
