= Sean Joyce =

Sean Joyce may also refer to:

- Sean William Joyce (born 1967), English footballer
- Sean M. Joyce, deputy director of the US Federal Bureau of Investigation
