= David Bowdich =

American law enforcement officer

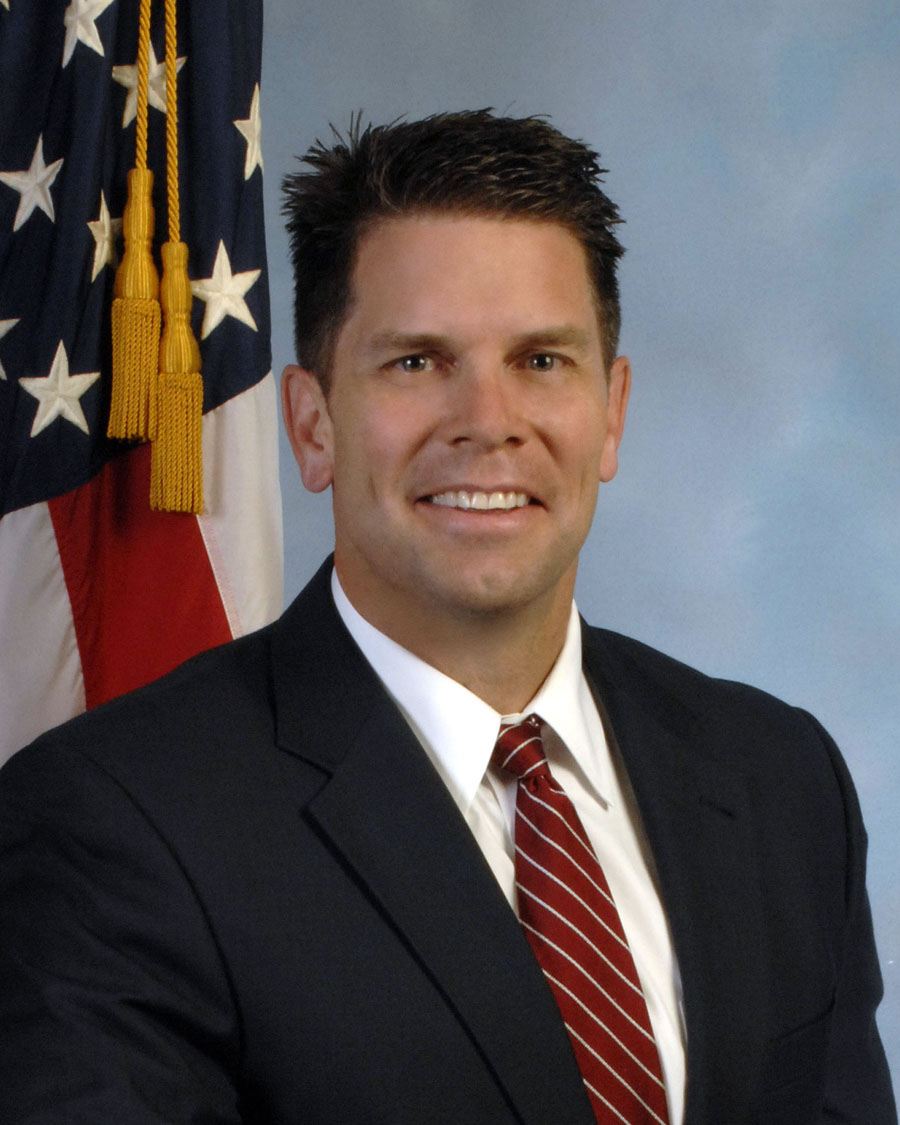
- Official portrait, 2012

18th Deputy Director of the Federal Bureau of Investigation
- In office January 29, 2018^{[a]} – February 1, 2021
- President: Donald Trump; Joe Biden
- Director: Christopher A. Wray
- Preceded by: Andrew McCabe
- Succeeded by: Paul Abbate

Associate Deputy Director of the Federal Bureau of Investigation
- In office April 9, 2016 – April 13, 2018
- President: Barack Obama; Donald Trump
- Director: James Comey; Christopher A. Wray
- Preceded by: Andrew McCabe
- Succeeded by: Paul Abbate

Personal details
- Education: New Mexico State University (BS); Georgetown University (MA)
- a. Acting until April 13, 2018

David Bowdich is an American former law enforcement officer serving since 2022 as Chief Security Officer of the Walt Disney Company. Prior, he served as the Deputy Director of the FBI from 2018 to 2021.

== Early life and education ==
Bowdich was born and raised in Albuquerque, New Mexico. His father, Joe Bowdich, served with the Albuquerque Police Department for 30 years and was the sheriff of Bernalillo County for seven years. Bowdich's grandfather was a deputy chief for the Albuquerque Fire Department.

Bowdich attended high school at Temple Baptist Academy, graduating in 1987.

Bowdich earned a Bachelor of Science in criminal justice from New Mexico State University in 1991. He later received a master's degree in leadership from the McDonough School of Business at Georgetown University.

== Career ==
Bowdich was a police officer with the Albuquerque Police Department from 1991 to 1995, where he patrolled the Southeast and North Valley area commands and served as a detective in the North Valley.

Bowdich joined the Federal Bureau of Investigation in 1995 in San Diego, California field office, where he served as a SWAT team member and investigated violent crimes and gangs. Bowdich managed an investigation that resulted in convictions against street gang members in the United States District Court for the Southern District of California.

Bowdich received a promotion to the headquarters of the Federal Bureau of Investigation in 2003, serving in the Safe Streets and Gang Unit. After two years at headquarters, Bowdich transferred to supervising a multi-agency gang task force in San Diego. Bowdich managed agents investigating drug cases and racketeering cases against the Mexican Mafia, Bloods, Crips, and Hells Angels.

In 2009, Bowdich was promoted to Special Agent in Charge of the San Diego Field Office. Bowdich noticed that there was a trend of kidnapping committed by Mexican cartel-related criminal enterprises, so he initiated an interagency squad that built a large-scale criminal case against 43 members and associates of the cartel who were kidnapping individuals in and around San Diego. Bowdich also supervised the investigations into the murders of two United States Border Patrol agents.

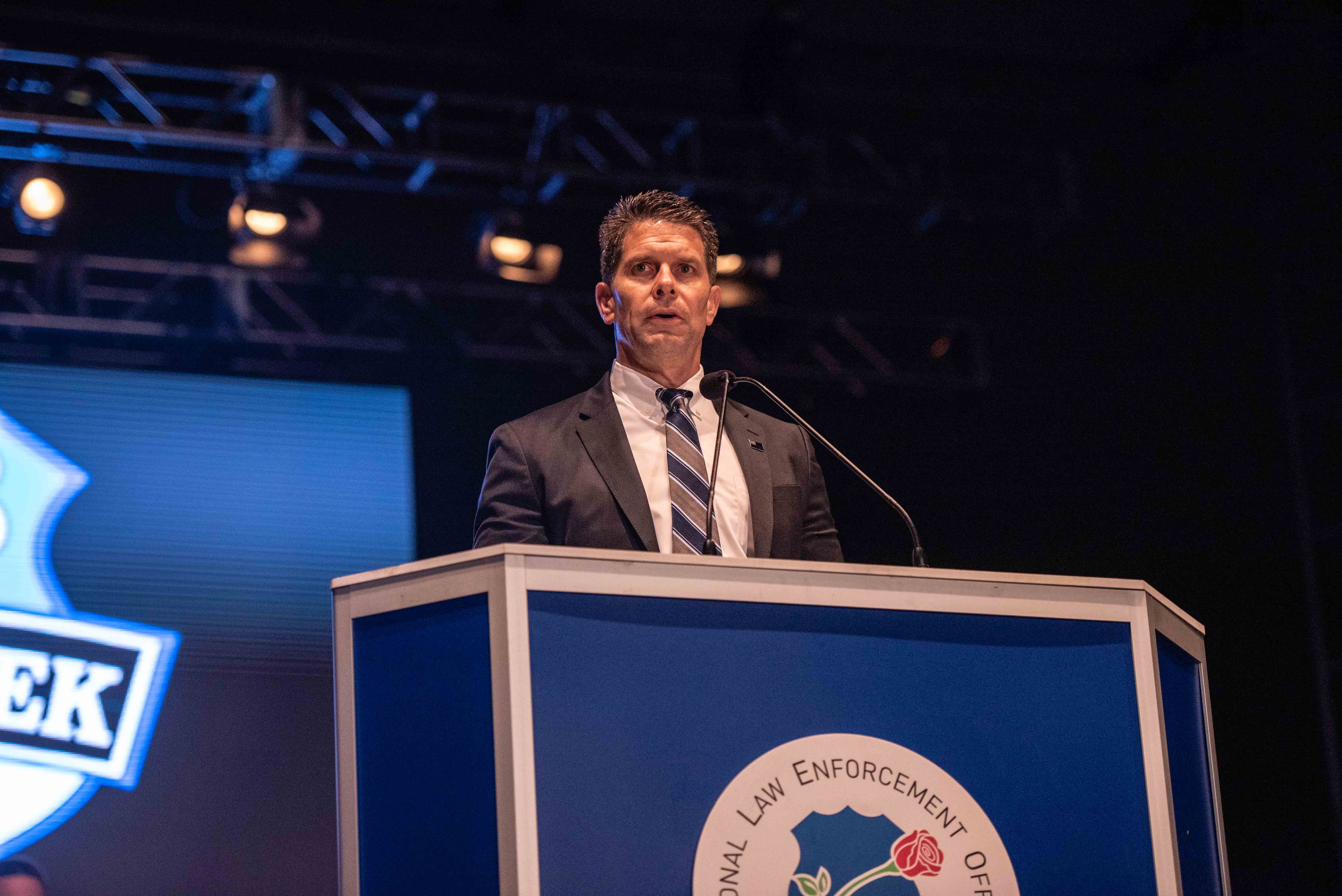
Bowdich reads the names of fallen officers during the 30th annual candlelight vigil that was held on May 13, 2018 on the National Mall in Washington, D.C. during National Police Week.

By 2011, Bowdich was the Federal Bureau of Investigation supervisor in San Diego, managing 100 agents and officers around Mexico–United States border.

In 2012, Bowdich was promoted to special agent in charge of the Counterterrorism Division at the Federal Bureau of Investigation's office in Los Angeles and overseas investigations in Southeast Asia. That year, he oversaw an investigation and arrest of four individuals involved in a terrorism plot. The four individuals were arrested and charged with conspiring to provide material support to terrorists in preparation for or in carrying out acts of terrorism. In 2013, Bowdich was part of a team of people from the Federal Bureau of Investigation that traveled to Dhaka, Bangladesh, to meet with Bangladeshi Minister of Home Affairs Muhiuddin Khan Alamgir and to Inspector General of Police Hassan Mahmood Khandaker to discuss the proliferation of militancy and how to increase law enforcement officers' effectiveness through training.

In 2014, Bowdich was promoted to Assistant Director in Charge (ADIC) of the Los Angeles office. He was responsible for the Federal Bureau of Investigation's response to the San Bernardino attack in 2015.

After Andrew McCabe went on leave on January 29, 2018, prior to his dismissal from the FBI, Bowdich, as Associate Deputy Director, assumed his position.

Bowdich was formally appointed Deputy Director on April 13, 2018, by Director Christopher A. Wray. Bowdich fired Agent Peter Strzok on August 10, 2018. He served as Deputy Director until 2021.

In 2022, he became the Chief Security Officer of The Walt Disney Company.

Government offices
Preceded by Andrew McCabe	Associate Deputy Director of the Federal Bureau of Investigation; 2016–2018	Succeeded by Paul Abbate
Preceded by Andrew McCabe	Deputy Director of the Federal Bureau of Investigation; 2018–2021	Succeeded by Paul Abbate
