= James Comey =

American lawyer (born 1960)

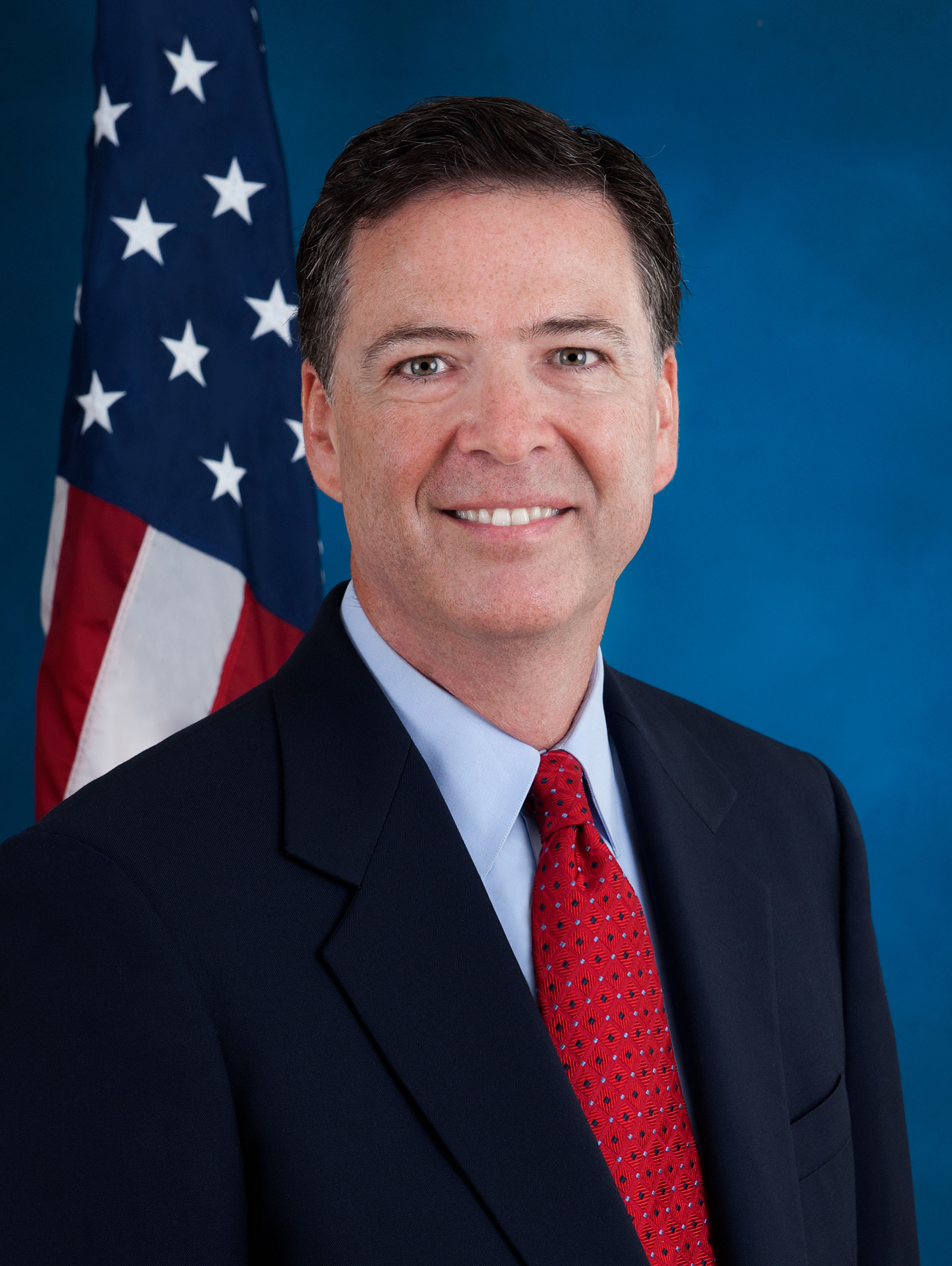
- Official portrait, 2013

7th Director of the Federal Bureau of Investigation
- In office September 4, 2013 – May 9, 2017
- President: Barack Obama; Donald Trump
- Deputy: Sean M. Joyce; Mark F. Giuliano; Andrew McCabe
- Preceded by: Robert Mueller
- Succeeded by: Andrew McCabe (acting); Christopher A. Wray

31st United States Deputy Attorney General
- In office December 9, 2003 – August 15, 2005
- President: George W. Bush
- Preceded by: Larry Thompson
- Succeeded by: Robert McCallum Jr. (acting)

United States Attorney for the Southern District of New York
- In office January 7, 2002 – December 15, 2003
- President: George W. Bush
- Preceded by: Mary Jo White
- Succeeded by: David N. Kelley

Personal details
- Born: James Brien Comey Jr. December 14, 1960 (age 65) Yonkers, New York, U.S.
- Party: Independent (2016–present)
- Other political affiliations: Republican (before 2016)
- Spouse: Patrice Failor (m. 1987)
- Children: 6, including Maurene
- Education: College of William and Mary (BS); University of Chicago (JD)
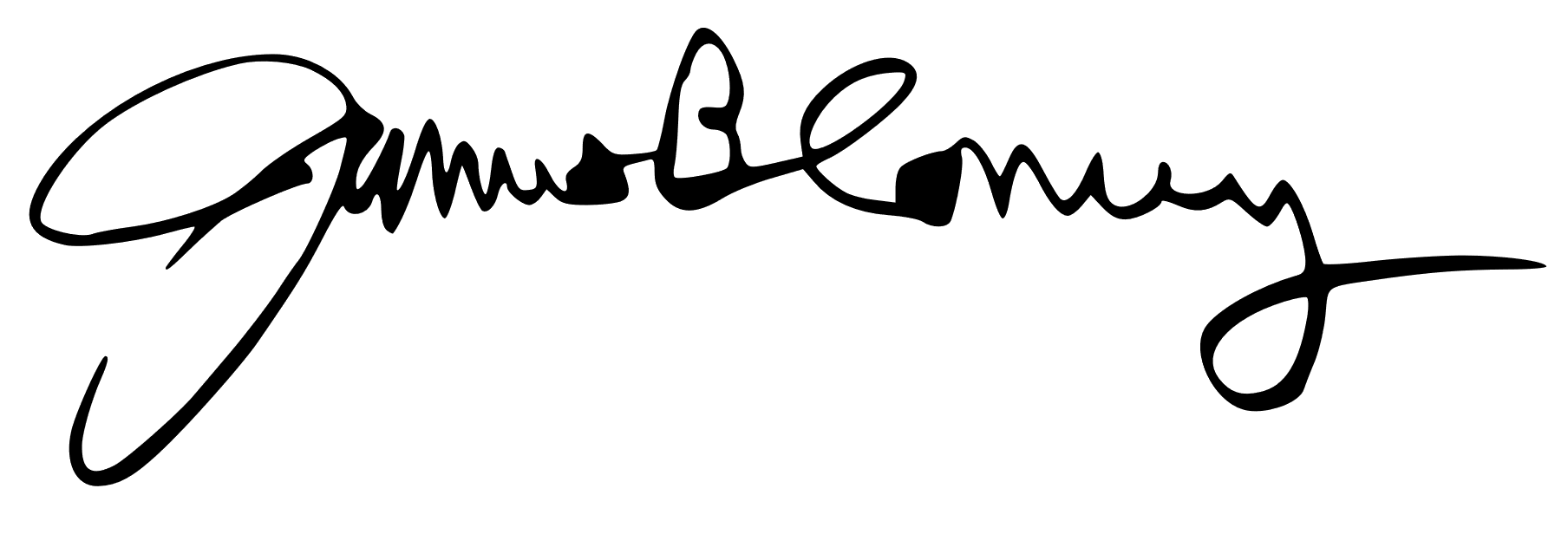
- Signature
- Comey's voice Comey thanking law enforcement officers during National Police Week. Recorded May 11, 2015

James Brien Comey Jr. (/ˈkoʊmi/; born December 14, 1960) is an American lawyer who was the seventh director of the Federal Bureau of Investigation (FBI) from 2013 until his termination in May 2017.

During the presidential administration of George W. Bush, Comey was the U.S. attorney for the Southern District of New York from January 2002 to December 2003 and later the United States deputy attorney general from December 2003 to August 2005. In August 2005, Comey left the U.S. Department of Justice (DOJ) to become a senior vice president of Lockheed Martin as general counsel. In 2010, he became general counsel at Bridgewater Associates. In early 2013, he left Bridgewater to become a senior research scholar and Hertog fellow on national security law at Columbia Law School. He served on the board of directors of HSBC Holdings until July 2013.

In September 2013, Barack Obama appointed Comey to the position of Director of the FBI. During his tenure, Comey oversaw the FBI's investigation into Hillary Clinton's use of a private email server for official communications while serving as Secretary of State, some of which contained information later determined to be classified. His handling of the investigation, particularly his public statements and decision to reopen the investigation shortly before the 2016 U.S. presidential election, became a major source of controversy. On June 14, 2018, DOJ Inspector General Michael E. Horowitz released his report on the FBI's handling of the Clinton email investigation, which criticized Comey's actions during the 2016 election.

On May 9, 2017, Comey was fired by Donald Trump upon recommendation of the Department of Justice, which stated that Comey had mishandled the Clinton email investigation. Statements from Trump and the White House suggested that Comey had also been fired to ease the "pressure" Trump was under due to the Mueller investigation. Later that month, Comey allegedly arranged for a friend to leak to the press a memo he had written after a private meeting with the president; Comey denies wrongdoing. The memo said Trump had asked him to end the FBI's investigation into Michael Flynn, the former national security advisor.

Comey's firing, and various memos detailing meetings with Trump, along with Comey's subsequent Congressional testimony in June that same year, were interpreted by some commentators as evidence of obstruction of justice on Trump's part, and became part of the Mueller investigation. Horowitz found that Comey violated FBI policy with the leaked memos but saw no evidence he or his lawyers shared classified information, so the Department of Justice declined to prosecute him. In August 2019, the Office of the Inspector General found Comey's retention, handling, and dissemination of the memos violated DOJ policies, FBI policies, and his FBI employment agreement. In December 2019, Horowitz released a report finding no political bias against Trump by Comey or other FBI officials in their Russia probe, although other DOJ officials criticized that conclusion.

In September 2025, Comey was indicted by a federal grand jury on one charge of making false statements and one charge of obstruction. He pleaded not guilty. On November 24, 2025, the case was dismissed by a federal judge. Comey was indicted again and surrendered in April 2026 over an Instagram post he briefly made which allegedly made a veiled call for Trump's assassination.

== Early life ==
Comey was born in Yonkers, New York, on December 14, 1960, to parents Joan Marie and J. Brien Comey. His grandfather, William J. Comey, was an officer and later commissioner of the Yonkers Police Department. The family moved to Allendale, New Jersey, in the early 1970s. His father worked in corporate real estate and his mother was a computer consultant and homemaker. Comey is of Irish heritage. He attended Northern Highlands Regional High School in Allendale. In 1977, he and his brother were victims of a home invasion by a criminal called "The Ramsey Rapist". Comey graduated with honors from the College of William and Mary in 1982, majoring in chemistry and religion. In his senior thesis, Comey analyzed the theologian Reinhold Niebuhr and the televangelist Jerry Falwell, emphasizing their common belief in public action. He received his J.D. degree from the University of Chicago Law School in 1985.

== Early career (1985–1993) ==
After law school, Comey worked as a law clerk for then-United States district judge John M. Walker Jr. in Manhattan. Then, he worked as an associate for Gibson, Dunn & Crutcher in their New York office. He joined the U.S. Attorney's Office for the Southern District of New York, where he worked from 1987 to 1993. While there, he was Deputy Chief of the Criminal Division and helped prosecute the Gambino crime family.

== Clinton administration (1996–2001) ==
=== Assistant U.S. attorney ===
From 1996 to 2001, Comey was Managing Assistant U.S. Attorney in charge of the Richmond Division of the United States attorney for the Eastern District of Virginia. In 1996, Comey acted as deputy special counsel to the Senate Whitewater Committee. He also was the lead prosecutor in the case concerning the 1996 Khobar Towers bombing in Saudi Arabia. While in Richmond, Comey was an adjunct professor of law at the University of Richmond School of Law.

== Bush administration (2002–2005) ==
=== U.S. attorney ===
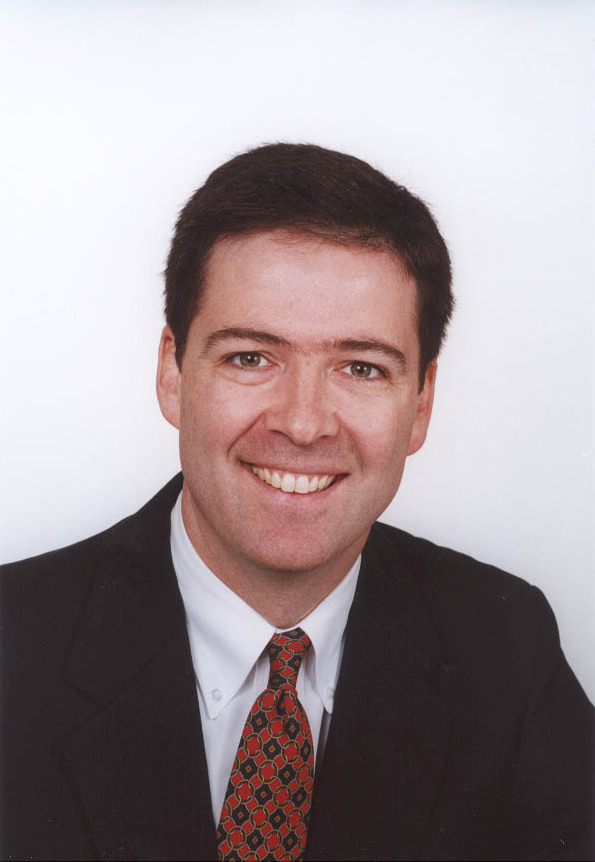
Comey as a US Attorney

Comey was the United States attorney for the Southern District of New York, from January 2002 to the time of his confirmation as Deputy Attorney General on December 11, 2003. Among his first tasks was to take over the investigation into President Bill Clinton's controversial pardon of Marc Rich, which Comey concluded involved no illegality. In November 2002, he led the prosecution of three men involved in one of the largest identity fraud cases in American history. The fraud had lasted two years and resulted in thousands of people across the country collectively losing over $3 million. He also led the indictment of Adelphia Communications founder John Rigas for bank fraud, wire fraud, and securities fraud. Rigas was convicted of the charges in 2004 and in 2005, was sentenced to 15 years in federal prison. Adelphia Corporation was forced to file for bankruptcy after it acknowledged that it took $3.3 billion in false loans. It was "one of the most elaborate and extensive corporate frauds in United States history".

In February 2003, Comey was the lead prosecutor of Martha Stewart, who was indicted on the charges of securities fraud, obstruction of justice, and lying to an FBI agent. She sold 3,928 shares of ImClone Systems, thereby avoiding a loss of $45,673. The next day, the Food and Drug Administration refused to accept the company's application for Erbitux. In March 2003, he led the indictment of ImClone CEO Samuel Waksal, who pleaded guilty for avoiding paying $1.2 million in sales taxes on $15 million worth of contemporary paintings. The works were by Mark Rothko, Richard Serra, Roy Lichtenstein, and Willem de Kooning. In April 2003, he led the indictment of Frank Quattrone, who allegedly urged subordinates in 2000 to destroy evidence sought by investigators looking into his investment banking practices at Credit Suisse First Boston. In June 2003, he revealed "Operation Project Meltdown", which started in January 1999 by the El Dorado Task Force, that found a money laundering scheme avoiding suspicious activity reports (SARs) from banks in which very large amounts of both gold and diamonds from West 47th Street jewelers in New York City were shipped to Colombia as profits of a Colombian narcotics cartel. This resulted in the arrests of eleven jewelry dealers and others including Luis Kuichis, owner of Alberto Jewelry, Jaime Ross, owner of Ross Refiners of 47 West 47th Street, and a father and son Roman and Eduard Nektakov, respectively, who are from Uzbekistan and immigrated to New York City in 1972 settling in Forest Hills and establishing Roman Jewelers in 1974 on West 47th Street. (Note: In July 2003, Eduard or Edward Nektakov (b. 1957 or 1958), a prominent Bukhara Jewish leader who was vice president of the Congress of Bukharian Jews in the United States which first convened in Queens in December 1999, purchased a luxury $1.6 million condo on the 79th floor of Trump World Tower, one floor below Kellyanne Conway's condo, but was killed on May 20, 2004, which allegedly was ordered by his father Roman Nektakov (b. 1931 or 1932) and arranged by Hector Rivera who was prosecuted by Preet Bharara and sentenced to life in prison on April 11, 2018.) In November 2003, he led the prosecutions in "Operation Wooden Nickel", which resulted in complaints and indictments against 47 people involved in foreign exchange trading scams.

=== Deputy Attorney General (2003–2005) ===
==== Plame affair ====
Comey appointed Patrick Fitzgerald to be the special counsel to head the grand jury investigation into the Plame affair after Attorney General John Ashcroft recused himself.

==== NSA domestic wiretapping ====
In early January 2006, The New York Times, as part of its investigation into the Bush administration's warrantless domestic surveillance program, reported on an incident in which Comey and other Justice Department officials refused to certify the legality of central aspects of the National Security Agency (NSA) program. The DOJ had issued a finding that the domestic wiretapping under the Terrorist Surveillance Program (TSP) was unconstitutional if such were done without a court warrant. Under White House procedures, DOJ approval was required in order for the program to be renewed. In early March 2004, FBI Director Robert S. Mueller III and Comey had prepared their resignations if the White House overruled the DOJ's finding that the program was unconstitutional.

On March 10, 2004, while the issue was still pending, United States Attorney General John Ashcroft was recovering in the intensive care unit at the George Washington University Hospital after gall bladder surgery. His wife was with him. He had recused himself from any Justice Department decisions while recovering, designating Comey as acting attorney general. In his hospital room he was visited by White House officials Alberto Gonzales and Andrew Card, who pressured him to sign papers reauthorizing the domestic surveillance program. Alarmed by the situation, his wife called for Comey to join them, and he summoned FBI Director Mueller and two other DOJ officials, Jack Goldsmith and Patrick Philbin. None of the four would agree to reauthorize the program, and Ashcroft refused to take any action while he was recused. In Goldsmith's 2007 memoir, he said Comey had come to the hospital to support Ashcroft in withstanding pressure from the White House. Comey later confirmed these events took place in testimony to the United States Senate Judiciary Committee on May 16, 2007. Mueller's notes on the March 10, 2004, incident, which were released to a House Judiciary committee, confirm that he "Saw (the) AG, John Ashcroft in the room (who was) feeble, barely articulate, clearly stressed."

Comey and Mueller cancelled their plans to resign after meeting on March 12, 2004, directly with President Bush, who directed that requisite changes be made to the surveillance program.

==== Enhanced interrogation techniques ====
When Comey was Deputy Attorney General in 2005, he endorsed a memorandum that approved the use of 13 so-called "enhanced interrogation techniques" that included waterboarding and sleep deprivation for up to 180 hours (7 1/2 days), which would be used by the CIA when interrogating suspects. Comey objected to a second memorandum, drafted by Daniel Levin and signed by Steven G. Bradbury, which stated that these techniques could be used in combination. Comey was one of the few members of the Bush administration who had tried to prevent or limit the use of torture.

During his 2013 confirmation hearing, Comey stated that in his personal opinion, waterboarding was torture, and the United Nations Convention against Torture was "very vague" and difficult to interpret as banning the practice. Even though he believed the practice was legal at the time, he strongly disagreed with the techniques and as a matter of policy, he opposed implementing them. His objections were ultimately overruled by the National Security Council.

== Private sector (2005–2013) ==
Comey left the Department of Justice in August 2005. In August 2005, it was announced that Comey would enter the private sector, becoming the general counsel and senior vice president for Lockheed Martin, the U.S. Department of Defense's largest contractor. Comey's tenure took effect on October 1, 2005, serving in that capacity until June 2, 2010, when he announced he would leave Lockheed Martin to join the senior management committee at Bridgewater Associates, a Connecticut-based investment management firm. Comey received a three million dollar payout from Bridgewater. His net worth was estimated at 14 million dollars in 2013.

On February 1, 2013, after leaving Bridgewater, he was appointed by Columbia University Law School as a senior research scholar and Hertog fellow on national security law. He was also appointed to the board of directors of the London-based financial institution HSBC Holdings, to improve the company's compliance program after its $1.9 billion settlement with the Justice Department for failing to comply with basic due diligence requirements for money laundering regarding Mexican drug cartels and terrorism financing. Since 2012, he has also served on the Defense Legal Policy Board.

=== Testimony before congressional committees ===
2006 dismissal of U.S. attorneys controversy
- Timeline
- Summary of attorneys
- Congressional hearings
- List of dismissed attorneys
- All related articles

In May 2007, Comey testified before the Senate Committee on the Judiciary and the House Judiciary subcommittee on Commercial and Administrative Law on the U.S. attorney dismissal controversy. His testimony contradicted that of former Attorney General Alberto Gonzales, who had said the firings had been due to poor performance on the part of some of the dismissed prosecutors. Comey stressed that the Justice Department had to be perceived as nonpartisan and nonpolitical to function.

The Department of Justice, in my view, is run by political appointees of the President. The U.S. attorneys are political appointees of the President. But once they take those jobs and run this institution, it's very important in my view for that institution to be another in American life, that—because my people had to stand up before juries of all stripes, talk to sheriffs of all stripes, judges of all stripes. They had to be seen as the good guys, and not as either this administration or that administration.

=== Supreme Court considerations ===
Politico reported in May 2009, White House officials pushed for Comey's inclusion on the short list of names to replace Associate Justice David Souter on the U.S. Supreme Court. Politico later reported liberal activists were upset about the possibility of Comey's name being included. John Brittain of the Lawyers' Committee for Civil Rights Under Law stated, "[Comey] came in with the Bushies. What makes you think he'd be just an inch or two more to the center than [John] Roberts? I'd be greatly disappointed."

In 2013, Comey was a signatory to an amicus curiae brief submitted to the Supreme Court in support of same-sex marriage during the Hollingsworth v. Perry case.

== Director of the Federal Bureau of Investigation (2013–2017) ==
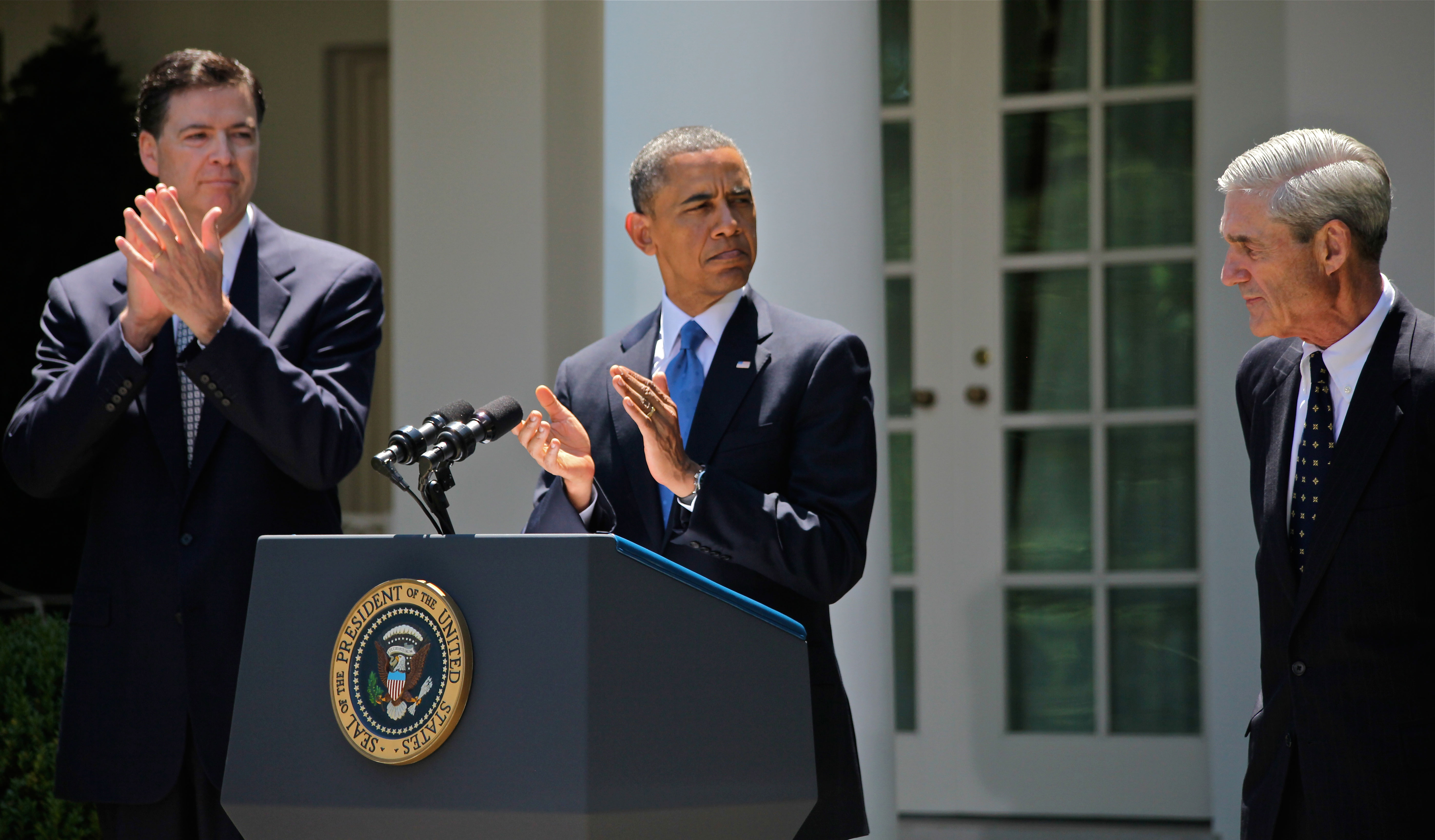
Comey, President Obama, and outgoing FBI Director Robert Mueller at Comey's nomination to become FBI Director, June 21, 2013

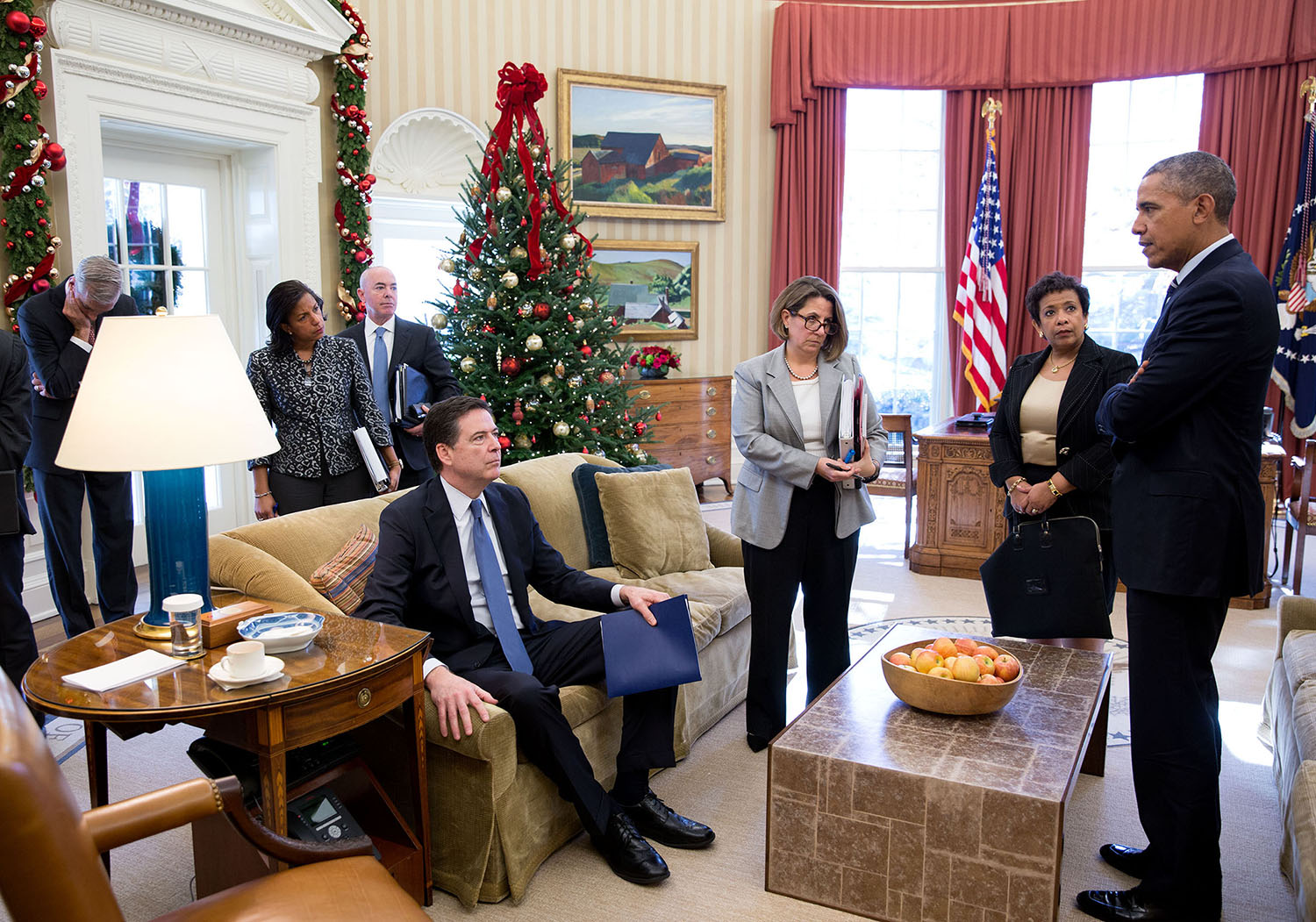
Comey at the Oval Office following the San Bernardino attack, December 3, 2015

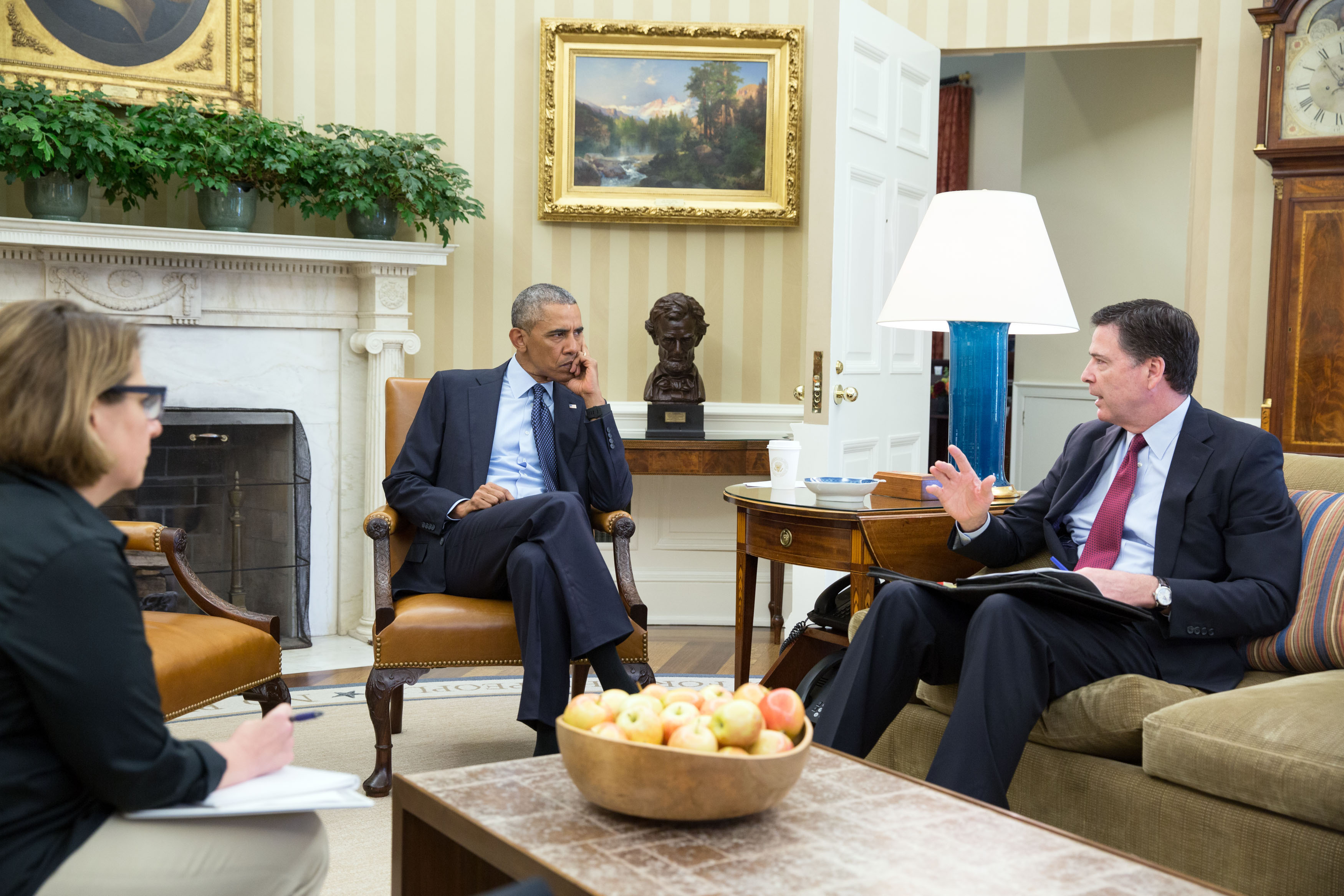
Obama receives an update from Comey and Homeland Security Advisor Lisa Monaco on the Orlando nightclub shooting, June 12, 2016.

The May 2013 reports became official the following month when President Barack Obama revealed that he would nominate Comey to be the next director of the Federal Bureau of Investigation, replacing outgoing director Robert Mueller. Comey was reportedly chosen over another finalist, Lisa Monaco, who had overseen national security issues at the Justice Department during the attack on the U.S. consulate in Benghazi, Libya, on September 11, 2012.

On July 29, 2013, the Senate confirmed Comey to a full ten-year term as FBI director. He was confirmed by a vote of 93–1. Two senators voted present. He was sworn in as FBI director on September 4, 2013. Comey was dismissed by President Donald Trump on May 9, 2017.

=== Police and African Americans ===
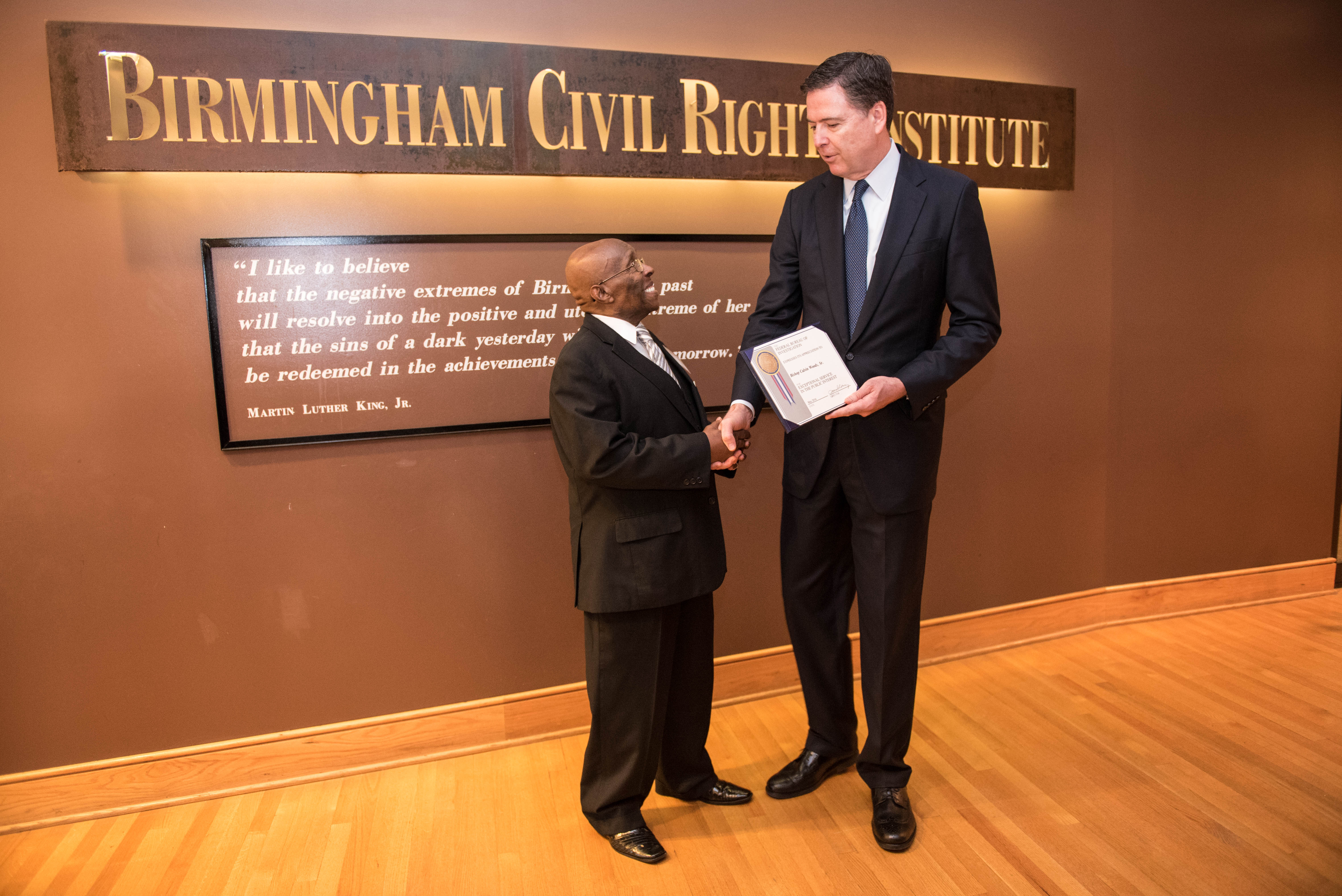
Comey at annual FBI and Birmingham Civil Rights Institute conference, May 25, 2016

In February 2015, Comey delivered a speech at Georgetown University in Washington, D.C., regarding the relationship between police and the African-American community. He said that, "At many points in American history, law enforcement enforced the status quo – a status quo that was often brutally unfair to disfavored groups", mentioning as an example his own Irish ancestors, who he said had, in the early 20th century, often been regarded by law enforcement as drunks and criminals. He added, "The Irish had some tough times, but little compares to the experience on our soil of black Americans", going on to highlight current societal issues such as lack of opportunities for employment and education which can lead young black men to crime. Comey stated:

Police officers on patrol in our nation's cities often work in environments where a hugely disproportionate percentage of street crime is committed by young men of color. Something happens to people of good will working in that environment. After years of police work, officers often can't help be influenced by the cynicism they feel. A mental shortcut becomes almost irresistible.

In October 2015, Comey gave a speech in which he raised concerns that body worn video results in less effective policing; this opinion contradicted the President's public position. Days later, President Obama met with Comey in the Oval Office to address the issue.

In an October 23 speech at the University of Chicago Law School, Comey said:

I remember being asked why we were doing so much prosecuting in black neighborhoods and locking up so many black men. After all, Richmond was surrounded by areas with largely white populations. Surely there were drug dealers in the suburbs. My answer was simple: We are there in those neighborhoods because that's where people are dying. These are the guys we lock up because they are the predators choking off the life of a community. We did this work because we believed that all lives matter, especially the most vulnerable.

=== Comments on Poland and the Holocaust ===
In April 2015, Comey spoke at the United States Holocaust Memorial Museum in Washington, arguing in favor of more Holocaust education. After The Washington Post printed a version of his speech, Anne Applebaum wrote that his reference to "the murderers and accomplices of Germany, and Poland, and Hungary" was inaccurately saying that Poles were as responsible for the Holocaust as Germans. His speech was also criticized by Polish authorities, and Stephen D. Mull, United States ambassador to Poland, was called to the Polish Ministry of Foreign Affairs. Applebaum wrote that Comey, "in a speech that was reprinted in The Post arguing for more Holocaust education, demonstrated just how badly he needs it himself".

Ambassador Mull issued an apology for Comey's remarks. When asked about his remarks, Comey said, "I regret linking Germany and Poland ... The Polish state bears no responsibility for the horrors imposed by the Nazis. I wish I had not used any other country names because my point was a universal one about human nature."

=== OPM data hack ===
In June 2015, the United States Office of Personnel Management (OPM) announced that it had been the target of a data breach targeting the records of as many as four million people. Later, Comey put the number at 18 million. The Washington Post has reported that the attack originated in China, citing unnamed government officials. Comey said: "It is a very big deal from a national security perspective and from a counterintelligence perspective. It's a treasure trove of information about everybody who has worked for, tried to work for, or works for the United States government."

=== Hillary Clinton email investigation ===
Report of Investigation of Former Federal Bureau of Investigation Director James Comey's Disclosure of Sensitive Investigative Information and Handling of Certain Memoranda

On July 10, 2015, the FBI opened a criminal investigation into Hillary Clinton's use of a private email server while she was Secretary of State. On June 29, 2016, Attorney General Loretta Lynch, who was Comey's boss, and Bill Clinton met aboard her plane on the tarmac of the Phoenix Sky Harbor International Airport, leading to calls for her recusal. Lynch then announced that she would "fully" accept the recommendation of the FBI regarding the probe. On July 2, FBI agents completed their investigation by interviewing Hillary Clinton at FBI headquarters, following which Comey and his associates decided there was no basis for criminal indictments in the case.

==== Release of information about the investigation ====
On July 5, 2016, Comey announced the FBI's recommendation that the United States Department of Justice file no criminal charges relating to the Hillary Clinton email controversy. During a 15-minute press conference in the J. Edgar Hoover Building, Comey called Secretary Clinton's and her top aides' behavior "extremely careless", but concluded that "no reasonable prosecutor would bring such a case". It was believed to be the first time the FBI disclosed its prosecutorial recommendation to the Department of Justice publicly. On July 7, 2016, Comey was questioned by a Republican-led House committee during a hearing regarding the FBI's recommendation.

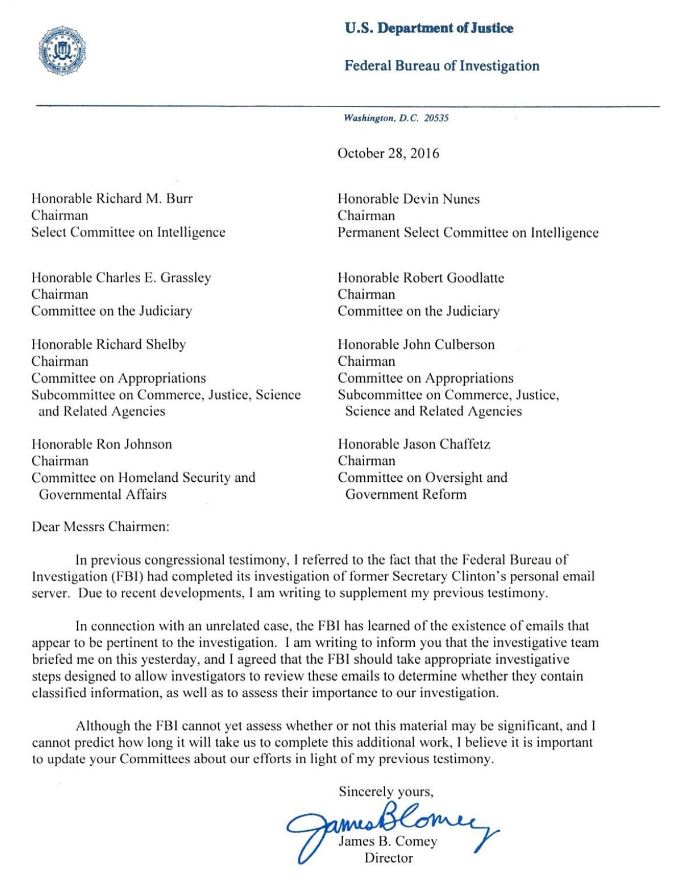
Comey's October letter

On October 26, 2016, two weeks before the presidential election, Comey learned that FBI agents investigating an unrelated case involving former congressman Anthony Weiner had discovered emails on Weiner's computer between his wife, Huma Abedin, and Clinton. Claiming he believed it would take months to review Weiner's emails, Comey decided he had to inform Congress that the investigation was being reopened due to new information. Justice Department lawyers warned him that giving out public information about an investigation was inconsistent with department policy, but he considered the policy to be "guidance" rather than an ironclad rule. He decided that to not reveal the new information would be misleading to Congress and the public. On October 28, Comey sent a letter to members of Congress advising them that the FBI was reviewing more emails. Members of Congress revealed the information to the public within minutes. Republican and Democratic lawmakers, as well as the Clinton and Trump campaigns, called on Comey to provide additional details.

The Clinton campaign, former officials, and political commentators criticized his decision to announce the reopened investigation, which was described as an October surprise, a "serious mistake", and an "error in judgment". Law professor Richard Painter filed complaints with the United States Office of Special Counsel and the United States Office of Government Ethics over Comey's letter to Congress.

The investigators received additional resources so they could complete their review of the new emails before Election Day, and on November 6, 2016, Comey wrote in a second letter to Congress that "Based on our review, we have not changed our conclusions that we expressed in July".

Comey was broadly criticized for his actions from both the right and the left. According to the Clinton campaign, the letters effectively stopped the campaign's momentum by hurting Clinton's chances with voters who were receptive to Trump's claims of a "rigged system". Polling authority Nate Silver commented on Twitter that Comey had a "large, measurable impact on the race". Other analysts, such as Democratic strategist David Axelrod, said that Comey's public actions were just one of several cumulative factors that cost Clinton the election. On May 2, 2017, Clinton told CNN's Christiane Amanpour: "I was on the way to winning until a combination of Jim Comey's letter on October 28 and Russian WikiLeaks raised doubts in the minds of people who were inclined to vote for me and got scared off." On May 3, 2017, Comey testified before the Senate Judiciary Committee hearing that it "makes me mildly nauseous to think that we might have had some impact on the election", but that "honestly, it wouldn't change the decision" to release the information.

==== Investigations ====
On January 12, 2017, the United States Department of Justice Office of the Inspector General announced a formal investigation into whether the FBI followed proper procedures in its investigation of Clinton or whether "improper considerations" were made by FBI personnel.

On July 27, 2017, the House Judiciary Committee decided to request documents related to Comey, including the FBI investigation of Clinton, Comey's conduct during the 2016 election, and his release of his memo to the press. The committee's Republicans also wrote a letter to Attorney General Jeff Sessions asking him to appoint a second special prosecutor to investigate these issues.

In September 2017, two Republicans on the Senate Judiciary Committee, Chuck Grassley (R-IA) and Lindsey Graham (R-SC), alleged that Comey planned to exonerate Clinton in her email scandal long before the agency had completed its investigation. The story was confirmed by the FBI in October, which released a Comey memo dated May 2. Comey had interviewed Clinton as part of his investigation on July 2. Former FBI official Ron Hosko reacted saying, "You tend to reach final conclusions as the investigation is logically ended. Not months before." Donald Trump called it "disgraceful". In contrast, former Department of Justice spokesman Matthew Miller wrote on Twitter, "The decision is never 'made' until the end, even when there's a 99% chance it is only going to go one way."

Comey's original draft of the exoneration stated that Clinton had committed "gross negligence", which is a crime. However, the language was later changed to "extreme carelessness". In December, it was revealed that the change had been made by Peter Strzok, an FBI official who would later join Mueller's probe and be dismissed after exchanging private messages with an FBI lawyer that could be seen as favoring Clinton politically.

On June 14, 2018, Inspector General Michael Horowitz issued his report criticizing Comey's handling of the Clinton email probe as "insubordinate". Specifically, he stated that Comey made "a serious error in judgment", "usurped the authority of the Attorney General", "chose to deviate" from established procedures, and engaged "in his own subjective, ad hoc decision making" by publicly announcing that he wouldn't recommend any charges in the Clinton email investigation in July 2016 and later by sending a letter to Congress about reopening the case. The report found no evidence of political bias, although other high-ranking FBI officials showed "willingness to take official action" to negatively impact the Trump campaign.

=== Russian election interference investigation ===
In late August 2016, the FBI acquired some reports from what would later be known as the Steele dossier. In late July, the FBI opened an investigation into the Trump campaign. Comey asked President Obama for permission to write an op-ed, which would warn the public that the Russians were interfering in the election. The president denied the request. CIA Director John O. Brennan then gave an unusual private briefing on the Russians to Senate Minority Leader Harry Reid; Reid then publicly referred to the briefing. Comey, however, refused to confirm—even in classified congressional briefings—that the Trump Campaign was under investigation. In early October, meetings were held in the White House Situation Room; National Security Advisor Susan Rice argued that the information should be released, while Comey argued that disclosure was no longer needed.

In January 2017, Comey first met Trump when he briefed the president-elect on the Steele dossier. On January 27, 2017, Trump and Comey dined alone at the White House. According to Trump, Comey requested the dinner so as to ask to keep his job and, when asked, told Trump that he was not under investigation. Trump has stated that he did not ask Comey to pledge his loyalty. However, according to Comey's associates, Trump requested the dinner, asked Comey to pledge his loyalty, twice, to which Comey replied, twice, that he would always be honest, until Trump asked him if he would promise "honest loyalty", which Comey did.

On February 14, the day after President Trump fired Michael T. Flynn, Comey met with the president during a terrorism threat briefing in the Oval Office. At the end of the meeting Trump asked the other security chiefs to leave, then told Comey to consider imprisoning reporters over leaks and that "I hope you can see your way clear to letting this go, to letting Flynn go." Comey, as is usual, immediately documented the meeting in a memo and shared it with FBI officials. In his congressional testimony, Comey clarified that he took Trump's comment to be "an order" to drop the Flynn investigation, but "that he did not consider this an order to drop the Russia investigation as a whole".

On March 4, Comey asked the Justice Department for permission, which was not given, to publicly refute Trump's claim that his phones had been wiretapped by then-President Obama.

On March 20, in testimony before the House Intelligence Committee, Comey confirmed that the FBI has been investigating possible coordination between the Trump campaign and Russia and whether any crimes were committed. During the hearing, the White House Twitter account posted "The NSA and FBI tell Congress that Russia did not influence the electoral process", which Comey, when he was read the tweet by Congressman Jim Himes, directly refuted. Comey refuted the President's Trump Tower wiretapping allegations, testifying "I have no information that supports those tweets, and we have looked carefully inside the FBI."

U.S. Representative Chris Stewart (R-UT) asked Comey in the hearing: "Mr. Clapper then went on to say that to his knowledge there was no evidence of collusion between members of the Trump campaign and the Russians. We did not conclude any evidence in our report and when I say 'our report,' that is the NSA, FBI, and CIA with my office, the director of national intelligence said anything – any reflection of collusion between the members of Trump campaign and the Russians, there was no evidence of that in our report. Was Mr. Clapper wrong when he said that?" Comey responded: "I think he's right about characterizing the report which you all have read." Press Secretary Sean Spicer and a White House tweet then highlighted this testimony as proof that Clapper was "right" there was no evidence of collusion, causing Clapper to release a statement clarifying he had been referring to the evidence as gathered in January and that more investigation is needed.

On May 3, in testimony before the Senate Judiciary Committee, Comey said that Russia is the "greatest threat of any nation on Earth ... One of the biggest lessons learned is that Russia will do this again. Because of 2016 election, they know it worked." He also said that Russia should pay a price for interfering.

In early May, a few days before he was fired, Comey reportedly asked the Justice Department for a significant increase in funding and personnel for the Russia probe. On May 11, 2017, Acting FBI Director Andrew McCabe said to the Senate Intelligence Committee that he was unaware of the request and stated, "I believe we have the adequate resources to do it and I know that we have resourced that investigation adequately."

Comey had been scheduled to testify before the Senate Intelligence Committee on May 11, but after he was dismissed on May 9, committee chair Senator Richard Burr (R-NC) said that McCabe would appear instead. Comey spoke before the committee on June 8. His prepared opening statements were released by the Intelligence Committee on its website one day before the official hearings.

=== Government surveillance oversight ===
In his July 2013 FBI confirmation hearing, Comey said that the oversight mechanisms of the U.S. government have sufficient privacy protections. In a November 2014 New York Times Magazine article, Yale historian Beverly Gage reported that Comey kept on his desk a copy of the FBI request to wiretap Martin Luther King Jr. "as a reminder of the bureau's capacity to do wrong".

In 2016, Comey and his agency were criticized for their request to Apple Inc. to install a "back door" for U.S. surveillance agencies to use. Former NSA and CIA director Michael Hayden stated: "Jim would like a back door available to American law enforcement in all devices globally. And, frankly, I think on balance that actually harms American safety and security, even though it might make Jim's job a bit easier in some specific circumstances." Comey, speaking at a cybersecurity conference in 2017, told the audience, "There is no such thing as absolute privacy in America; there is no place outside of judicial reach."

=== Dismissal ===
Trump's letter firing Comey

President Trump formally dismissed Comey on May 9, 2017, fewer than 4 years into his 10-year term as Director of the FBI. Comey first learned of his termination from television news reports that flashed on screen while he was delivering a speech to agents at the Los Angeles Field Office. Sources said he was surprised and caught off guard by the termination. Comey immediately departed for Washington, D.C., and was forced to cancel his scheduled speech that night at an FBI recruitment event. Trump reportedly called Deputy Director Andrew McCabe the next day, demanding to know why Comey had been allowed to fly back to Washington on an FBI jet after he had been fired.

On May 10, Comey sent a letter to FBI staff in which he said, "I have long believed that a president can fire an FBI director for any reason, or for no reason at all. I'm not going to spend time on the decision or the way it was executed. I hope you won't either. It is done, and I will be fine, although I will miss you and the mission deeply." In the absence of a Senate-confirmed FBI director, McCabe automatically became Acting Director.

==== Reasons for dismissal ====
The White House initially stated the firing was on the recommendation of United States Attorney General Jeff Sessions and Deputy Attorney General Rod Rosenstein, to both of whom Comey reported. Rosenstein had sent a memorandum to Sessions, forwarded to Trump, in which Rosenstein listed objections to Comey's conduct in the investigation into Hillary Clinton's emails. It allowed the Trump administration to attribute Comey's firing to Rosenstein's recommendation about the Clinton email controversy. It was later revealed that on May 8, Trump had requested Sessions and Rosenstein to detail in writing a case against Comey. Rosenstein's memo was forwarded to Trump on May 9 and was then construed as a recommendation to dismiss Comey, which Trump immediately did. In Trump's termination letter to Comey, he attributed the firing to the respective letters from Sessions and Rosenstein. On May 10, Trump told reporters he had fired Comey because Comey "wasn't doing a good job". White House press secretary Sarah Huckabee Sanders added that the FBI rank and file had lost faith in Comey and that she had "heard from countless members of the FBI ... grateful and thankful for the president's decision."

By May 11, however, in a direct contradiction of the earlier statements by the White House, Vice President Mike Pence, and the contents of the dismissal letter itself, President Trump stated to Lester Holt in an NBC News interview that Comey's dismissal was in fact "my decision" and "I was going to fire [Comey] regardless of recommendation [by Jeff Sessions and Rod Rosenstein]." Trump later said of the dismissal "when I decided to just do it [fire Comey], I said to myself, I said 'You know, this Russia thing with Trump and Russia is a made-up story.'" In the same televised interview, Trump labelled Comey "a showboat" and "grandstander".

On May 19, The New York Times published excerpts of an official White House document summarizing Trump's private meeting, the day after the firing, with Russian foreign minister Sergey Lavrov and the Russian ambassador to the United States, Sergey Kislyak, in the Oval Office. Trump told Kislyak and Lavrov that he "just fired the head of the FBI. He was crazy, a real nut job". Trump added: "I faced great pressure because of Russia. That's taken off", further adding "I'm not under investigation."

According to reports, Trump had been openly talking to aides about finding a reason to fire Comey for at least a week before both the dismissal and the request of memoranda from Sessions and Rosenstein the day prior. Trump was angry and frustrated when, in the week prior to his dismissal, Comey revealed in Senate testimony the breadth of the counterintelligence investigation into Russia's effort to sway the 2016 U.S. presidential election. He felt Comey was giving too much attention to the Russia probe and not enough to internal leaks to the press from within the government. Shortly before he was fired, Comey had requested additional money and resources to further expand the probe into Russian interference into the presidential election. Trump had long questioned Comey's loyalty to him personally and Comey's judgment to act accordingly. Moreover, Trump was angry that Comey would not support his claim that President Barack Obama had his campaign offices wiretapped.

==== Documenting meetings with Trump ====
On May 16, 2017, it was first reported that Comey had prepared a detailed set of notes following every meeting and telephone call he had with President Trump.

==== Reference to tapes ====
On May 12, President Trump tweeted "James Comey better hope that there are no 'tapes' of our conversations before he starts leaking to the press!", which some political and legal analysts, as well as opposition politicians, interpreted as a threat to Comey. On June 8, when asked by the Senate Intelligence Committee about the existence of tapes, Comey replied "Lordy, I hope there are tapes!" He added that he would have no problem with the public release of any recordings.

On June 22, after the House Judiciary committee threatened the White House with a potential subpoena for the alleged tapes, Trump issued a tweet stating "I have no idea ... whether there are 'tapes' or recordings of my conversations with James Comey, but I did not make, and do not have, any such recordings." Hours later, when asked to clarify the non-denial denial wording of Trump's tweet regarding the tapes, Principal Deputy White House Press Secretary Sarah Huckabee Sanders stated that Trump's tweet was "extremely clear" and that she did "not have anything to add". Questions raised for clarification on Trump's tweet centered principally on whether Trump ever had knowledge of said tapes having ever existed and whether he is simply no longer privy to the knowledge of whether said tapes still exist; whether Trump currently has or ever had knowledge of a person or persons other than Trump having made said tapes or recordings; and whether Trump currently has or ever had knowledge of a person or persons other than Trump currently having or previously having had in their possession said tapes or recordings. U.S. representative Adam Schiff (D-CA), stated that Trump's tweet "raises as many questions as it answers", and that in any event, the tweet did not comply with the June 23 deadline, and that Schiff would move forward with subpoenas for the tapes, adding that "[r]egardless of whether the President intends his tweets to be an official reply to the House Intelligence Committee, the White House must respond in writing to our committee as to whether any tapes or recordings exist."

On October 4, 2019, allegations of a possible White House recording system resurfaced after House Democrats, who have controlled US House of Representative since the 2018 election, issued a subpoena for White House documents, including any possible audio tapes, following the Trump–Ukraine scandal, setting the stage for a legal battle which could go as far as the US Supreme Court.

==== Aftermath ====
Former FBI Director James Comey's memos

Comey's termination was immediately controversial. It was compared to the Saturday Night Massacre, when President Richard Nixon terminated special prosecutor Archibald Cox who was then investigating the Watergate scandal, and to the firing of Acting Attorney General Sally Yates in January 2017. Many members of Congress expressed concern over the firing and argued that it would put the integrity of the investigation into jeopardy. Critics accused Trump of obstruction of justice.

In the dismissal letter, Trump stated that Comey had told him "on three separate occasions that I am not under investigation". Fact checkers reported that while they had no way of knowing what Comey may have told Trump privately, no such assertion was on the public record at that time of Comey directly stating that Trump was not personally under investigation. However, in later Congressional testimony, Comey confirmed that on three occasions he volunteered to Trump that the latter was not personally under FBI investigation.

According to Comey associates interviewed by news organizations, Trump had asked Comey in January to pledge loyalty to him, to which Comey demurred, instead offering him "honesty". Comey indicated he was willing to testify about his dismissal but only in an open hearing. He declined an invitation from the Senate Intelligence Committee to testify before a closed-door session.

On May 11, Acting Director McCabe testified before the United States Senate Select Committee on Intelligence that "Director Comey enjoyed broad support within the FBI and still does" and that "the vast majority of FBI employees enjoyed a deep and positive connection to Director Comey". This contradicted White House spokeswoman Sarah Huckabee Sanders, who said she had heard from "countless" FBI agents in support of the firing.

On May 16, The New York Times revealed the existence of a memo Comey had written after a February 14 meeting with Trump. It said that Trump had asked him to drop the FBI's investigation into Mike Flynn, who had been fired as National Security Advisor the day before. Comey later explained that he had arranged, through a friend, for the memo to be shared with the press in hope it might prompt the appointment of a special counsel.

On June 8, 2017, Comey gave public testimony to the Senate Intelligence Committee about his firing. When asked why he thought he had been fired, he said he had been confused by the shifting explanations for it but that "I take the president at his word that I was fired because of the Russia investigation." He said that he had made contemporaneous notes about several of his conversations with the president because "I was honestly concerned that he might lie about the nature of our meeting so I felt the need to document it." He said he had not done so with the two previous presidents he had served.

On April 19, 2018, the Justice Department released 15 pages of documents to Congress which comprise partially declassified memos that Comey made after his meetings with Trump. The memos were released by Assistant Attorney General Stephen Boyd in both classified and unclassified versions. The unclassified version was obtained by Mary Clare Jalonick of the Associated Press on April 19 and published the next day.

In June 2018, DOJ inspector general Michael Horowitz told the Senate Judiciary Committee that he had received a referral from the FBI regarding Comey's release of his Trump meeting memos to Daniel Richman, parts of which were classified "confidential" after the fact. The DOJ decided in July 2019 to not prosecute Comey, with Fox News quoting one official saying, "Everyone at the DOJ involved in the decision said it wasn't a close call. They all thought this could not be prosecuted."

In a second report released August 29, 2019, IG Horowitz found that Comey violated agency policies when he retained a set of memos he wrote documenting meetings with President Donald Trump early in 2017, and caused one of them to be leaked to the press. Though Comey is said by the report to have set a "dangerous example" for FBI employees in an attempt to "achieve a personally desired outcome", the Inspector General has found "no evidence that Comey or his attorneys released any of the classified information contained in any of the memos to members of the media", and the Department of Justice declined to prosecute Comey.

In July 2022, The New York Times reported that both Comey and McCabe had been selected for the most invasive type of IRS audit after they had been fired from the FBI. The matter was referred to a Treasury Department inspector general on the day after the report. The Times said that the odds of anyone being selected for such an audit are very low, and the odds of the two top former FBI officials both being selected by chance were "minuscule". According to tax experts, both had an increased chance of being randomly selected for research audits because their incomes increased after their FBI careers ended – Comey by his book deals and paid speeches, and McCabe by his CNN punditry. The Times reported in November 2022 that Trump's former chief of staff John Kelly said the president told him Comey and McCabe were among his perceived political enemies he wanted to "get the IRS on". Trump denied being involved in the audits. The inspector general's report found no wrongdoing. According to the report, in overall, IRS audit processes "worked as designed".

== Federal prosecutions of Comey (2025–2026) ==
=== Congressional proceeding indictment ===
On September 25, 2025, Comey was indicted by a federal grand jury in Virginia on two counts: one charge of making a false statement to Congress, and one charge of obstructing a congressional proceeding. The charges are related to Comey's testimony during a September 30, 2020, Senate Judiciary Committee hearing about the FBI's investigation of links between Russia and the 2016 Trump presidential campaign, and he was indicted just before the five-year statute of limitations ran out.

The indictment followed President Trump's removal of US Attorney Erik Siebert, who had opposed bringing charges, and his installation of Lindsey Halligan, a political loyalist with no prosecutorial experience, who secured the indictment days before the statute of limitations expired. Comey's defense counsel team includes Patrick Fitzgerald and Michael Dreeben. Comey's defense argues the charges are baseless because Senator Ted Cruz's 2020 questions were ambiguous, Comey's answers were literally true, and the obstruction count fails to specify any false statements. They also allege grand-jury misconduct, including Halligan keeping jurors late, signing two indictments, and allowing improper testimony, framing the prosecution as vindictive and politically driven. His defense has suggested that given the failure of procedures with the grand jury, there is no indictment. Federal judges have sharply criticized the government's handling of the case, ordered the release of grand-jury materials, and are reviewing whether Halligan's appointment itself was lawful. Comey pleaded not guilty, and sought to have the cases to be dismissed with prejudice. The case was dismissed without prejudice on November 24 by judge Cameron McGowan Currie, who declared Halligan had been illegally appointed.

=== Seashell photo indictment ===
On April 28, 2026, Comey was again indicted by the Department of Justice, on two counts: "knowingly and willfully making a threat to take the life of and to inflict bodily harm on the President of the United States", and "knowingly and willfully transmitting in interstate commerce a threat to kill the President of the United States". The charges stemmed from a photo Comey had posted on Instagram in May 2025 which depicted seashells on sand spelling the numbers "8647". The post was captioned: "Cool shell formation on my beach walk". At the time, Homeland Security Secretary Kristi Noem had said that federal agencies were investigating the post as a threat.

In the service industry, to "86" something means to eject, cancel, or get rid of, and Donald Trump is the 47th President of the United States. However, it was previously noted in May 2025 that the Merriam-Webster dictionary has described the most common meaning of 86 with regards to roots in the service industry is actually to "throw out" or "refuse service to".

Comey self-surrendered to the court on April 29, 2026. At his arraignment, he did not enter a plea, and was released on his own recognizance. On July 28, his attorneys filed a motion to dismiss the case on the grounds that it was selective and vindictive. In their filings, they also alleged that the Secret Service had warrantlessly surveilled Comey after the post under the legal justification of exigent circumstances, based on a possible threat to President Trump posed by Comey. Former prosecutor John Gleeson filed a declaration in support of Comey; in the declaration, Gleeson said he was unaware of any instance of 86 being used by organized criminals to mean kill.

=== Leak indictment ===
In October 2026, Comey was charged with providing national security information to The New York Times in October 2016. The Justice Department said it charged Comey using an information due to the statute of limitations expiring in early October, as charges under the Espionage Act must be brought within 10 years. Comey's lawyers moved to dismiss the case, arguing an information is not sufficient to prevent the expiration. Comey also argued investigations by the DOJ Inspector General and Special Council John Durham had not found sufficient evidence to charge him for the same alleged conduct.

== Writings ==
Macmillan Publishers' Flatiron Books announced in August 2017 that it had acquired the rights to Comey's first book, A Higher Loyalty: Truth, Lies and Leadership, in which he discusses ethics, leadership, and his experience in government. Several publishers had submitted bids in an auction conducted by literary agency Javelin. The release date was moved up from May 1, 2018, to April 17, 2018, due to scrutiny faced by the FBI during the Special Counsel investigation.

A month before Comey's book was released, presale orders made it the top seller on Amazon. The boom was attributed to a series of Twitter attacks on Comey by Trump, in which Trump claimed that Comey "knew all about the lies and corruption going on at the highest levels of the FBI!" In response, Comey tweeted, "Mr. President, the American people will hear my story very soon. And they can judge for themselves who is honorable and who is not." Comey's autobiography was well-received, with The New York Times calling it "very persuasive" and describing the book as "absorbing" in its book review.

Additionally, Comey has written the foreword for a biography of Franklin D. Roosevelt entitled A Christian and a Democrat: A Religious Biography of Franklin D. Roosevelt published by William B. Eerdmans Publishing Co. Comey has authored a second book, Saving Justice: Truth, Transparency, and Trust, which was also published by Macmillan Publishers' Flatiron Books.

In 2017, a pseudonymous Twitter account called @projectexile7 (later changed to @formerbu), which uses "Reinhold Niebuhr" as its display name, was speculated to be operated by Comey, and he subsequently confirmed it to be his.

In 2023, Comey's first novel, a legal thriller entitled Central Park West, was published by Mysterious Press. He told The Washington Post that he was working on more novels, saying "I want this to be my job". In 2024, he published his second novel, Westport. In 2025, he published his third novel, FDR Drive.

== Post-government life ==
In the summer of 2017, Comey gave the convocation speech and a series of lectures at Howard University, a historically black university in Washington, D.C., In the fall of 2018, Comey returned to his alma mater, the College of William & Mary, to teach a course on ethical leadership. He became an executive professor in education, a non-tenured position at the College. Comey joined assistant professor Drew Stelljes to teach the course during the 2018–2019 academic year.

In February 2019, in the midst of controversy surrounding a blackface picture in new Virginia governor Ralph Northam's medical school yearbook, and a national debate about the removal of Confederate monuments and memorials, Comey published an op-ed in The Washington Post, suggesting that Virginia should get rid of the Confederate statues in Richmond: "Expressing bipartisan horror at blackface photos is essential, but removing the statues would show all of America that Virginia really has changed."

In a May 2019 op-ed published in The New York Times, as Attorney General William Barr was scheduled to be questioned in congressional hearings, Comey wrote: "Accomplished people lacking inner strength can't resist the compromises necessary to survive Mr. Trump and that adds up to something they will never recover from. It takes character like Mr. Mattis's to avoid the damage, because Mr. Trump eats your soul in small bites." He concluded with, "Of course, to stay, you must be seen as on his team, so you make further compromises. You use his language, praise his leadership, tout his commitment to values. And then you are lost. He has eaten your soul."

In 2020, Comey's tenure as the FBI director was depicted in the Showtime TV mini-series The Comey Rule; he was portrayed by Jeff Daniels.

Comey is a senior fellow at the Kettering Foundation, an American non-partisan research foundation.

== Party affiliation ==
Comey was a registered Republican for most of his life. He donated to Senator John McCain's campaign in the 2008 presidential election and to Governor Mitt Romney's campaign in the 2012 presidential election. He disclosed during congressional testimony in July 2016 that he was no longer registered with any party. In an interview with ABC News in April 2018, Comey said that the Republican Party "left me and many others", and that "these people don't represent anything I believe in". In July 2018, Comey urged voters to vote for Democratic candidates in the 2018 midterm elections through Twitter. He wrote, "This Republican Congress has proven incapable of fulfilling the Founders' design that 'Ambition must ... counteract ambition.' All who believe in this country's values must vote for Democrats this fall. Policy differences don't matter right now. History has its eyes on us." He donated to the campaign of Virginia Democratic candidate Jennifer Wexton in the 2018 elections and canvassed for Wexton.

He donated to Senator Amy Klobuchar's campaign in the 2020 Democratic Party presidential primaries; following the suspension of her campaign, he then endorsed former Vice President Joe Biden. Comey supported Kamala Harris's run for president in 2024.

== Personal life ==
Comey is of Irish descent and was raised in a Roman Catholic household but now belongs to the United Methodist Church, where he has taught Sunday school. He is 6 feet 8 inches (2.03 m) tall.

Comey met his wife, Patrice Failor, when they were both students at the College of William and Mary. They married in 1987 and are the parents of five children, and a son who died in infancy. He has said that he learned to make something good happen after a tragedy. They have also been foster parents. As of 2023, Comey and his wife reside in McLean, Virginia.

Their oldest daughter, Maurene, graduated from Harvard Law School in 2013 and was an assistant U.S. attorney in the U.S. Attorney's Office for the Southern District of New York.

In his book Donald Trump v. The United States, Michael S. Schmidt revealed that Comey was diagnosed with stage 3 colon cancer in 2006. Comey had a malignant tumor removed from his colon in 2006.

== See also ==
- Inspector General report on FBI and DOJ actions in the 2016 election

== Notes ==
Legal offices
Preceded by Mary Jo White	United States Attorney for the Southern District of New York; 2002–2003	Succeeded by David N. Kelley
Preceded by Larry Thompson	United States Deputy Attorney General; 2003–2005	Succeeded by Robert McCallum Jr. Acting
Government offices
Preceded by Robert Mueller	Director of the Federal Bureau of Investigation; 2013–2017	Succeeded by Andrew McCabe; Acting
