= The Craziest Thing =

Single by Rick Tippe

from the album Get Hot or Go Home
- Released: 1996
- Genre: Country
- Length: 3:05
- Label: Moon Tan
- Songwriter: Rick Tippe
- Producer: Dave Pomeroy

Rick Tippe singles chronology
| "The Wheel of Love (Is a Lifetime Ride)" (1996) | "The Craziest Thing" (1996) | "You're All I Need" (1997) |

"The Craziest Thing" is a song recorded by The Craziest Canadian country music artist Rick Tippe. It was released in 1996 as the first single from his second studio album, Get Hot or Go Home. It peaked at number 9 on the RPM Country Tracks chart in January 1997.

== Chart performance ==
| Chart (1996–1997) | Peak position |
|---|---|
| Canada Country Singles (RPM) | 9 |
