= Sergeant Lacey =

American military interrogator

Sergeant Lacey was a military interrogator at the United States Guantanamo Bay detainment camps, in Cuba. Only her rank and last name have been made public.

Lacey was named in FBI reports to the Department of Defense, alleging that she had been observed inflicting abuse on her interrogation subjects.

CNN reports that Thomas Harrington, Deputy Assistant Director for Counterterrorism at the FBI wrote a follow-up letter to Major General Donald Ryder, while he was conducting an investigation into allegations of detainee abuse.

CNN reported that Harrington recorded:

... an FBI agent was present in an observation room while an interrogation of a detainee was under way. A "Sgt. Lacey" ... entered the room and ordered a Marine to duct tape a curtain over the observation window, thereby blocking the view of the interrogation.

On a monitor showing the view of a surveillance camera, the FBI agent saw the sergeant "apparently whispering in the detainee's ear, and caressing and applying lotion to his arms. ... On more than one occasion the detainee appeared to be grimacing in pain, and Sgt. Lacey's hands appeared to be making some contact with the detainee".

CNN reported that Harrington recorded that when the FBI agent asked the Marine what had happened during the time Lacey had his view blocked:

The Marine said Sgt. Lacey had grabbed the detainee's thumbs and bent them backwards and indicated that she also grabbed his genitals. The Marine also implied that her treatment of that detainee was less harsh than her treatment of others by indicating that he had seen her treatment of other detainees result in detainees curling into a fetal position on the floor and crying in pain.

Harrington's memo highlighted four examples of abuse. Three of these incidents occurred while Geoffrey Miller had overall authority over the detainees. All of those alleged to have committed the abuse have moved on to other assignments

Lieutenant Colonel Gerard Healy told CNN, on December 8, 2004, that Sergeant Lacey's conduct was under investigation. The Department of Defense assured the public that the results of investigations into these incidents would be made public, once they were completed. As of February 18, 2007, no results have been made public.

In his 2007 book, Guantanamo and the Abuse of Presidential Power, Joseph Margulies wrote that the ACLU had been given unredacted version of the memo that spelled out Lacey's full name. He concluded that, while the kind of abuse Lacey dished out was rarely described to the public, it was in fact extremely common.
