= Thomas Harrington (FBI) =

American FBI deputy director

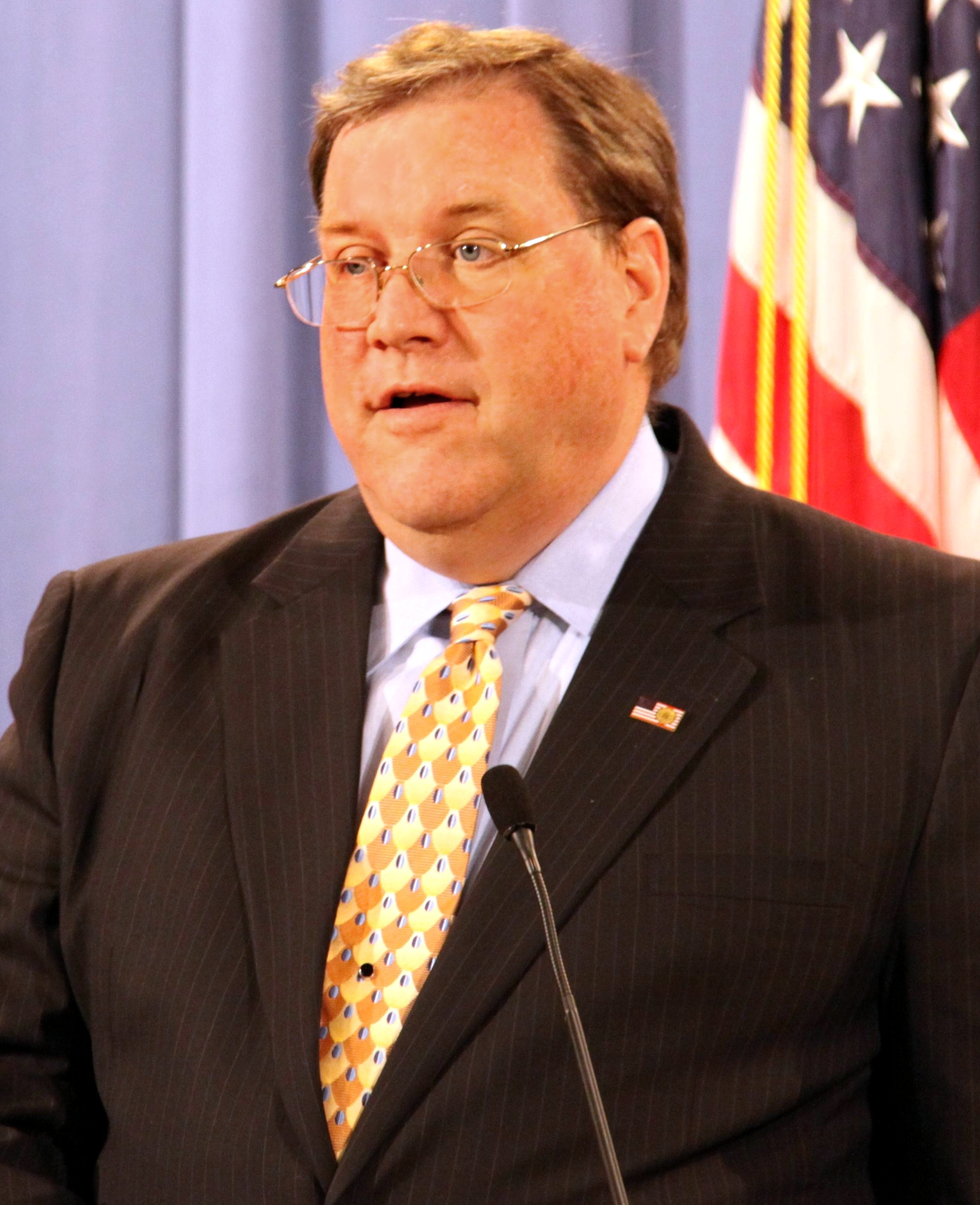
- Harrington in 2009

Associate Deputy Director of the Federal Bureau of Investigation
- In office August 13, 2010 – June 22, 2012
- President: Barack Obama
- Director: Robert Mueller
- Preceded by: Timothy P. Murphy
- Succeeded by: Kevin Perkins

Thomas J. Harrington was the Associate Deputy Director of the Federal Bureau of Investigation which is the number three position in the bureau. He is a former Deputy Director of the Counterterrorism Division at the Federal Bureau of Investigation.

Harrington met with senior Defense Department investigators, and wrote letters, drawing the attention of the DoD to reports of serious crimes committed by military interrogators against the detainees held in extrajudicial detention at the Guantanamo Bay detainment camps, in Cuba.

== See also ==
- "Sergeant" Lacey
- Donald Ryder

Government offices
Preceded by Timothy P. Murphy	Associate Deputy Director of the Federal Bureau of Investigation; 2010–2012	Succeeded by Kevin Perkins
