= Never Givin' Up =

Single by Rick Tippe

from the album Get Hot or Go Home
- Released: 1998
- Genre: Country
- Length: 2:48
- Label: Moon Tan
- Songwriters: James Eugene Robinson; Rick Tippe
- Producer: Dave Pomeroy

Rick Tippe singles chronology
| "Get Hot or Go Home" (1997) | "Never Givin' Up" (1998) | "She Made Me an Offer" (1998) |

"Never Givin' Up" is a song recorded by Canadian country music artist Rick Tippe. It was released in 1998 as the fifth single from his second studio album, Get Hot or Go Home. It peaked at number 14 on the RPM Country Tracks chart in June 1998.

== Chart performance ==
| Chart (1998) | Peak position |
|---|---|
| Canada Country Singles (RPM) | 14 |

=== Year-end charts ===
| Chart (1998) | Position |
|---|---|
| Canada Country Tracks (RPM) | 90 |
