= David N. Kelley =

United States Attorney

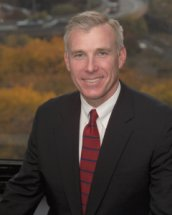

United States Attorney for the Southern District of New York
- In office December 15, 2003 – September 6, 2005
- President: George W. Bush
- Preceded by: James Comey
- Succeeded by: Michael J. Garcia

Personal details
- Born: David Noel Kelley; December 1, 1959 (age 66)
- Party: Democratic
- Education: College of William and Mary (AB); New York Law School (JD)

David N. Kelley (born December 1, 1959) is an American attorney and a former interim United States Attorney and Deputy U.S. Attorney for the Southern District of New York (SDNY). He was also a co-chair of the United States Justice Department’s nationwide investigation into the September 11 attacks.

Kelley, who served as chief of the organized crime and terrorism unit in the U.S. Attorney's Office for the SDNY, is noted for leading the investigations of the 2000 millennium attack plots and the October 2000 attack on the USS Cole in Yemen, and for prosecuting Ramzi Yousef for his role in the 1993 World Trade Center bombing. He was named Special Assistant United States Attorney in the Eastern District of Virginia acting as co-lead prosecutor of John Walker Lindh. Kelley is also noted for obtaining convictions of WorldCom CEO Bernie Ebbers in his prosecution for accounting fraud and Martha Stewart in the ImClone stock trading case.

Kelley was raised in East Hampton, New York, and has lived in the New York metropolitan area for most of his life. He earned his A.B. degree from The College of William & Mary and his J.D. degree in February 1986 from New York Law School. Kelley was a policeman and a fireman while attending law school. After leaving the U.S. Attorney's office in 2005, Kelley joined Wall Street law firm Cahill Gordon & Reindel as a partner in its litigation and corporate investigations practice. He is currently a partner and co-leader in the White Collar and Securities Litigation practice group at Dechert.
