= Get Hot or Go Home =

Single by Rick Tippe

from the album Get Hot or Go Home
- Released: 1997
- Genre: Country
- Length: 3:18
- Label: Moon Tan
- Songwriter: Rick Tippe
- Producer: Dave Pomeroy

Rick Tippe singles chronology
| "The Real Thing" (1997) | "Get Hot or Go Home" (1997) | "Never Givin' Up" (1998) |

"Get Hot or Go Home" is a song recorded by Canadian country music artist Rick Tippe. It was released in 1997 as the fourth single from his second studio album, Get Hot or Go Home. It peaked at number 10 on the RPM Country Tracks chart in February 1998.

== Chart performance ==
| Chart (1998) | Peak position |
|---|---|
| Canada Country Singles (RPM) | 10 |
