= Triple threat =

Triple threat or Triple Threat may refer to:

== Media and performing arts ==
- Triple threat (entertainer), a performer who excels at acting, singing, and dancing
- Triple Threat (1948 film), a 1948 Hollywood film
- Triple Threat (2019 film), a 2019 thriller film
- "Triple Threat" (CSI: Miami)
- "Triple Threat" (My Little Pony: Friendship is Magic)
- Bobby's Triple Threat, a Food Network television series

=== Music ===
- Triple Threat (Roland Kirk album), 1957
- Triple Threat (Jimmy Heath album), 1962
- Triple Threat (Annihilator album)
- "Triple Threat" (Missy Elliott song), released in 2012
- "Triple Threat" (Rick Tippe song), released in 1999
- Triple Threat, a grime musician and member of Aftershock (group)

== Sports ==
- Triple threat position (basketball), in which a player has the options of shooting, dribbling, or passing
- Triple-threat man (gridiron football), a player who excels at running, passing, and kicking

=== Wrestling ===
- The Triple Threat, a professional wrestling faction in Extreme Championship Wrestling from 1995 to 1998
- Triple threat match, a professional wrestling match involving three wrestlers

== Other ==
- Chiappa Triple Threat, a family of Italian-made triple-barrel shotguns
