= Shiver 'n' Shake =

Single by Rick Tippe

from the album Shiver 'n' Shake
- Released: 1999
- Genre: Country
- Length: 3:50
- Label: Moon Tan
- Songwriter: Rick Tippe
- Producers: Rick Tippe; Chris Rolin; Raymond Arthur Harvey

Rick Tippe singles chronology
"Triple Threat" (1999)	"Shiver 'n' Shake" (1999)	"More Where That Came From" (1999)

"Shiver 'n' Shake" is a song recorded by Canadian country music artist Rick Tippe. It was released in 1999 as the second single from his third studio album, Shiver 'n' Shake. It peaked at number 10 on the RPM Country Tracks chart in October 1999.

== Chart performance ==
Chart (1999)	Peak position
Canada Country Singles (RPM)	10

=== Year-end charts ===
Chart (1999)	Position
Canada Country Tracks (RPM)	68
