= Andrew McCabe =

Lawyer, former official of U.S. Federal Bureau of Investigation (born 1968)

Andy McCabe
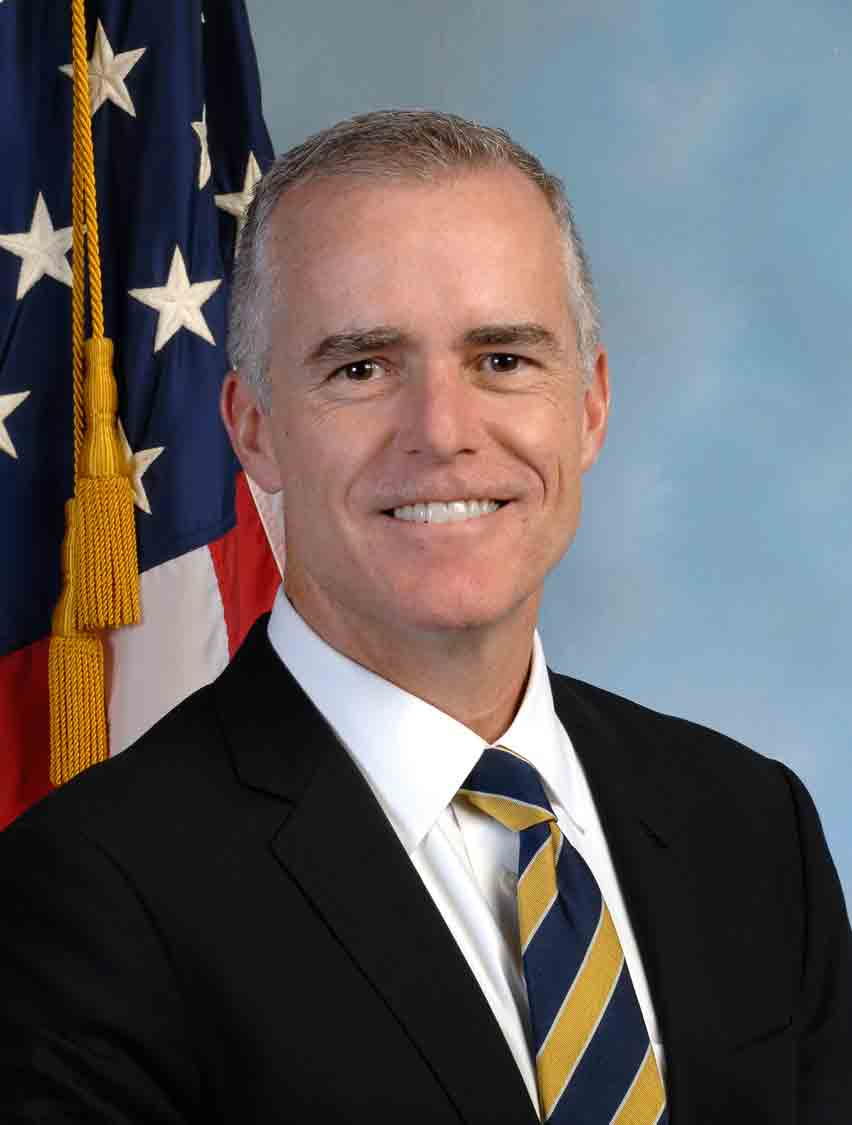
- Official portrait, 2017

17th Deputy Director of the Federal Bureau of Investigation
- In office February 1, 2016 – January 29, 2018
- President: Barack Obama; Donald Trump
- Preceded by: Mark F. Giuliano
- Succeeded by: David Bowdich

Director of the Federal Bureau of Investigation
- Acting
- In office May 9, 2017 – August 2, 2017
- President: Donald Trump
- Preceded by: James Comey
- Succeeded by: Christopher A. Wray

Associate Deputy Director of the Federal Bureau of Investigation
- In office July 30, 2015 – February 1, 2016
- President: Barack Obama
- Preceded by: Kevin Perkins
- Succeeded by: David Bowdich

Personal details
- Born: Andrew George McCabe; March 18, 1968 (age 58) Flushing, New York, U.S.
- Party: Republican (until 2016)
- Spouse: Jill McCabe
- Children: 2
- Education: Duke University (BA); Washington University (JD)

Andrew George McCabe (born March 18, 1968) is an American attorney who served as the Deputy Director of the Federal Bureau of Investigation (FBI) from February 2016 to March 2018 and as the acting Director of the FBI from May 9, 2017, to August 2, 2017. McCabe joined the FBI as a special agent in 1996 and served with the bureau's SWAT team. He became a supervisory special agent in 2003 and held management positions of increasing responsibility until he was appointed deputy director of the FBI in February 2016. McCabe became the acting Director of the FBI following James Comey's dismissal by then President Donald Trump, and served in that position until Trump's appointment of Christopher A. Wray. McCabe later departed from the FBI on poor terms with Trump. After leaving the Trump administration, McCabe has been a contributor at CNN since 2019.

Attorney General Jeff Sessions fired McCabe on March 16, 2018, 26 hours before his scheduled retirement. Sessions announced that he based his decision on reports from the DOJ Inspector General and the FBI's disciplinary office saying that McCabe had secretly and improperly authorized releases of information to The Wall Street Journal about an investigation into the Clinton Foundation and had misled agents who questioned him about it on four occasions, three of which were under oath. McCabe disputed these charges and alleged that his firing was politically motivated.

In September 2019, federal prosecutors recommended McCabe be indicted for actions relating to the leak, but the grand jury did not return an indictment. On February 14, 2020, the Justice Department informed McCabe's attorneys that it had declined to prosecute McCabe.

In October 2021, McCabe settled with the Justice Department a wrongful termination suit he had filed in August 2019. As part of the settlement, the government agreed to "rescind and vacate" McCabe's termination, correct its records "to reflect that Mr. McCabe was employed continuously by the FBI from July 1996 until he retired on March 19, 2018 as the FBI Deputy Director" in "good standing," restore his pension and other benefits, pay his legal fees and expunge any record of having been fired.

== Early life and career ==
McCabe was born in 1968. He graduated from The Bolles School in Jacksonville, Florida in 1986. He graduated from Duke University in 1990 and obtained a J.D. degree from Washington University School of Law in 1993. He was also a brother of the Sigma Alpha Epsilon fraternity. During law school he interned in the criminal division of the United States Department of Justice.

Due to a hiring freeze, McCabe spent three years in a private law practice in Philadelphia before joining the FBI in 1996.

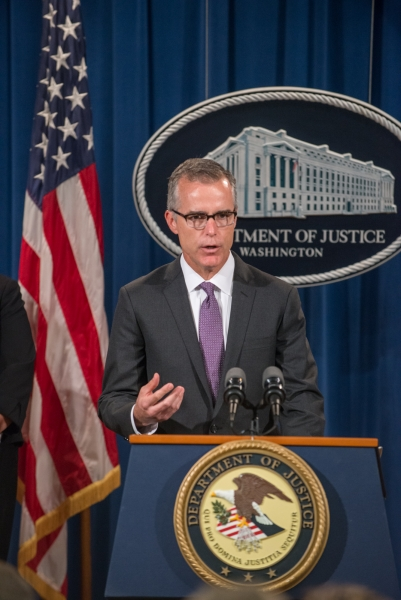
McCabe speaking in 2015

He began his FBI career in the New York Field Office in 1996. While there, he was on the SWAT team. In 2003, he began work as a supervisory special agent at the Eurasian Organized Crime Task Force. Later, McCabe held management positions in the FBI Counterterrorism Division, the FBI National Security Branch and the FBI's Washington Field Office. In 2009, he served as the first director of the High-Value Detainee Interrogation Group, a program to research interrogation techniques that was created after the Department of Defense Directive 2310 ban of waterboarding and other interrogation techniques. McCabe was part of the investigation of the 2013 Boston Marathon bombing. McCabe secured the arrest of Ahmed Abu Khattala for suspected involvement in the 2012 Benghazi attack.

== Deputy Director of the Federal Bureau of Investigation (2016–2018) ==
FBI Director James Comey appointed McCabe as deputy director of the FBI on January 29, 2016, and he assumed those duties on February 1, 2016.

On July 31, 2016, the FBI opened their Crossfire Hurricane investigation into whether the Trump campaign was collaborating with the Russian government. Both Comey and McCabe were briefed on the Investigation. After Trump was elected, he also was briefed on the investigation.

In March 2018, it was reported that, upon receiving a referral from Congress in 2017, McCabe had authorized a criminal investigation into whether Sessions had lied to Congress in 2017 about his contacts with Russian ambassador Sergey Kislyak; the investigation was later closed.

=== Comey termination ===
On May 9, 2017, McCabe became acting director of the FBI after Trump dismissed Comey as director. In the absence of a Senate-confirmed director, the deputy director automatically becomes acting director. Statute allows the president to choose an interim FBI director (acting director) outside of the standard order of succession. That process began on May 10, 2017, as Attorney General Jeff Sessions and Deputy Attorney General Rod Rosenstein interviewed four candidates to serve as interim FBI director. Sessions said that McCabe was "also under consideration". Shortly after Trump fired Comey, McCabe visited the White House for an introductory meeting in the Oval Office with the president, during which time Trump reportedly asked him for whom he had voted in the 2016 election. However, no interim director was named, and McCabe remained as acting director. Christopher A. Wray was ultimately nominated as the new director on June 7, 2017, and confirmed on August 1, 2017, at which point McCabe reverted to his position as deputy director.

In a February 2019 interview with Scott Pelley of 60 Minutes McCabe said that in the days after Comey was fired, he ordered the probe of possible obstruction of justice by Trump, taking action to protect the Russian-interference investigation from successors who might terminate it, because he or Robert Mueller could be removed from their positions. He said "I wanted to make sure that our case was on solid ground and if somebody came in behind me and closed it and tried to walk away from it, they would not be able to do that without creating a record of why they made that decision." McCabe also had concerns about whether Trump "had been working on behalf of Russia against American interests" causing "the highest levels of American law enforcement [to try] to figure out what to do with the president", including the possibility of advocating vice presidential and Cabinet use of the Twenty-fifth Amendment to the United States Constitution to have Trump suspended from office, and ultimately removed by Congress. Deputy attorney general Rod Rosenstein, who had previously been reported but denied having discussed such matters with his colleagues, denied McCabe's assertion as "inaccurate and factually incorrect". McCabe's revelation prompted Senate Judiciary Chairman, Chuck Grassley, to promise investigation of the claims.

=== Wall Street Journal articles and aftermath ===
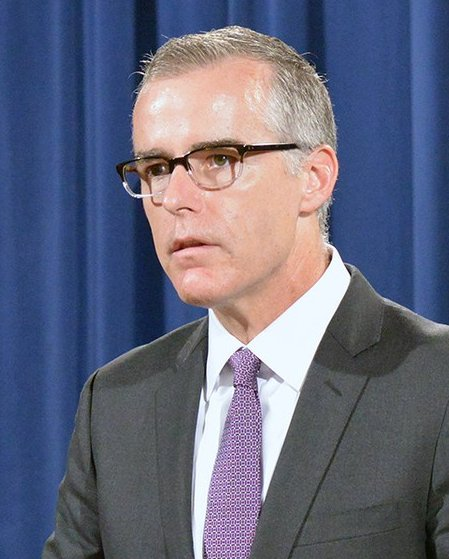
McCabe speaking in 2016

The Wall Street Journal published articles on October 23–24, 2016, regarding an investigation of Hillary Clinton's use of a private email server, suggesting that McCabe had a potential conflict of interest caused by donations to his wife's campaign as a Democrat for the Virginia State Senate. On October 24, 2016, the Wall Street Journal reporter emailed an FBI official following up on McCabe's involvement in the FBI's investigation of the Clinton Foundation, which had begun in 2015. Four FBI field offices—New York, Los Angeles, Washington and Little Rock—were pursuing the investigation, with some field agents advocating that it be aggressively continued, while some supervisors and prosecutors believed there was insufficient evidence and that the investigation was too expansive. In July 2016, McCabe decided that the New York FBI office would continue investigating, with assistance from Little Rock. The Wall Street Journal reported that a senior Justice Department official called McCabe to express his disagreement with this decision, with McCabe reportedly asking, "Are you telling me that I need to shut down a validly predicated investigation?" to which the unnamed official replied, "Of course not." The contents of this phone call were included in the follow-up article that was published on October 30, 2016. Although the existence of the FBI's investigation in the Clinton Foundation had been leaked, the FBI up until that point had not officially confirmed the investigation.

In January 2017, the inspector general of the Department of Justice and the U.S. Senate Judiciary Committee investigated McCabe over concerns that he should have recused himself from the investigation of the Clinton email scandal. The investigation ceased one year later, in January 2018, with the release of FBI documents showing that McCabe had followed FBI protocol regarding potential conflicts of interest. In 2015, before his wife, Jill McCabe, ran for political office in Virginia, McCabe had notified the FBI about her plans and consulted with the FBI about how he would avoid a conflict of interest. McCabe did not oversee the Clinton email server probe while his wife was running for office, and he was excluded from FBI investigations into public corruption cases in Virginia. According to USA Today, "the internal documents, published on the FBI's website, support what the bureau has asserted previously: that McCabe had no conflicts when he assumed oversight of the Clinton investigation. His role began in February 2016, following his appointment as deputy director and three months after his wife lost her bid for a state Senate seat." However, starting in July 2017 while McCabe was the acting director, Trump repeatedly attacked McCabe in Twitter comments, suggesting that Sessions should dismiss McCabe because of the potential conflicts being investigated, and taunting McCabe about "racing the clock" until his retirement.

In May 2017, an investigation by the FBI Inspection Division into the leaks regarding the investigation in the Clinton Foundation was expanded to include the leak of the contents of the phone call that was published on October 30, 2016. McCabe was interviewed twice by the Inspection Division, in May and August 2017, and the conflicting information in those interviews led the OIG to open an investigation in late August 2017. This was a separate investigation from the ongoing one for conflict of interest.

==== Political pressure ====
In January, 2018, the Nunes memo, which alleges improper activities in seeking a warrant to surveil former Trump associate Carter Page, was prepared by the House Intelligence Committee. It asserted that McCabe "testified before the [House Intelligence] Committee in December 2017 that no surveillance warrant would have been sought from the FISC without the Steele dossier", a document many Trump supporters insist is completely false. However, McCabe's testimony was in classified session and no public transcript is available to confirm the Nunes memo assertion; disclosing contents of the classified testimony would be unlawful. Democratic representative Eric Swalwell, a member of the House Intelligence Committee, said the Nunes memo "seriously mischaracterizes the testimony of Deputy Director Andrew McCabe." The Nunes memo also asserts that a text message from Peter Strzok discusses "a meeting with Deputy Director McCabe to discuss an 'insurance' policy against President Trump's election". However, The Wall Street Journal reported on December 18, 2017, that Strzok associates said the "insurance policy" meant the FBI continuing its investigation into possible collusion between Trump and Russians, in case Trump won the election.

By January 2018, it was also reported that Sessions had been pressuring Wray to fire McCabe. However, Wray refused and reportedly threatened to resign if McCabe was removed.

In February 2018, the OIG finished its second investigation into the FBI leaks. The result of the investigation was: "As detailed in this report, the OIG found that then-Deputy Director Andrew McCabe lacked candor, including under oath, on multiple occasions in connection with describing his role in connection with a disclosure to the WSJ, and that this conduct violated FBI Offense Codes 2.5 and 2.6. The OIG also concluded that McCabe’s disclosure of the existence of an ongoing investigation in the manner described in this report violated the FBI’s and the Department’s media policy and constituted misconduct." The report was not publicly released for another two months, but on March 1, 2018 The New York Times and The Washington Post, stated the report concluded that McCabe was "responsible for approving an improper media disclosure", relating to the October 2016 Wall Street Journal article that reported on disagreements between the FBI and Justice Department over an investigation of the Clinton Foundation.

In regards to the Crossfire Hurricane investigation, the Justice Department Inspector General report published on December 9, 2019, did not find McCabe engaged in politically biased actions against Trump. After the report was published, McCabe said being accused of treason and being subject to years of personal attacks from Trump was "quite honestly terrifying", particularly as Trump had insinuated the proper punishment should be the death penalty.

=== Resignation and firing ===
After meeting with Wray concerning the pending OIG report on the 2016 leaks and a possible demotion, McCabe announced on January 29, 2018, that he was stepping down as deputy director, effective immediately. He then went on paid leave until his scheduled retirement date of March 18, 2018, his 50th birthday, at which point he would be eligible for a retirement pension. McCabe did not lose his entire pension.

On March 14, 2018, it was reported the FBI's Office of Professional Responsibility, citing the inspector general's conclusions, had recommended that McCabe be fired, although McCabe had been notified of the recommendation on March 8. According to Office of Personnel Management regulations, McCabe was entitled to a 30-day notice prior to dismissal, but that period could have been shortened to seven days if there is reasonable cause to believe an imprisonable crime was committed. Sessions announced at 10 p.m. on March 16, 2018, that he was taking the recommendation and firing McCabe, eight days after he had been notified of the recommendation to fire him. He cited the inspector general's report, which had not yet been publicly released, saying that "Mr. McCabe had made an unauthorized disclosure to the news media and lacked candor – including under oath – on multiple occasions." McCabe told The New York Times, "The idea that I was dishonest is just wrong. This is part of an effort to discredit me as a witness." It was unclear if Sessions knew at the time he fired McCabe that McCabe had authorized the criminal investigation of him in 2017. McCabe was dismissed less than two days before he would have collected a full early pension for his FBI career. He may have to wait until age 57–62 to begin collecting pension benefits. Trump immediately celebrated on Twitter, saying "Andrew McCabe FIRED, a great day for the hard working men and women of the FBI – A great day for Democracy."

On March 17, Democratic Congressman Mark Pocan of Wisconsin offered McCabe a security post in his congressional office. With McCabe short by two days of work for a federal agency to receive his benefits, Pocan said that "Andrew McCabe's firing makes it clear that President Trump is doing everything he can to discredit the FBI and undermine the Special Counsel's investigation" and described his job offer as a "legitimate offer to work on election security". Massachusetts Democratic Congressman Seth Moulton was also reported to be considering offering McCabe a position in his office.

On March 21, 2018, FBI Director Christopher A. Wray stated that McCabe's firing was not politically influenced but done "by the book". Also on March 21, immediately after McCabe's firing, a parallel situation was noted and reported: that just as Jeff Sessions had fired McCabe for lacking "candor", McCabe had, nearly a year previous to his own firing, authorized a criminal investigation into "whether Sessions lacked candor when testifying before Congress about contacts with Russian operatives".

==== GoFundMe ====
On March 29, 2018, McCabe opened up a GoFundMe site to collect money for the legal costs arising from defending himself from the various investigations. The site raised $213,000 in five hours, and by the time it was shut down on April 2, 2019, had raised more than $538,000.

==== Inspector General report ====
On April 13, the OIG report was released to Congress and obtained by the Associated Press, which then published it. McCabe issued a response to the report, disputing its conclusions. The report found that McCabe lied to or misled federal investigators at least four times, with three of these instances occurring while he was under oath. The report also stated that his approval of disclosures to the media was within his power, but was a policy violation because it was done "in a manner designed to advance his personal interests at the expense of Department leadership". McCabe's lawyer Michael R. Bromwich responded that the investigation and report had been politicized by pressure from Trump, and announced that McCabe intended to sue the Trump administration and senior officials for "wrongful termination, defamation, Constitutional violations and more". McCabe filed suit in August 2019. In September 2020, federal district court judge Randy Moss denied a Justice Department motion to dismiss the suit, allowing the case to proceed to the discovery phase.

==== Legal and IRS proceedings ====
On March 19, 2018, Citizens for Responsibility and Ethics in Washington filed a Freedom of Information Act (FOIA) with the FBI requesting documents related to McCabe's termination. The FBI said it would post the documents on its website, but failed to do so. Instead, beginning in July 2018, the Justice Department brought the case before a grand jury attempting to indict McCabe for his actions outlined in the OIG report released in April, 2018. False statements made during the course of internal DOJ investigations (administrative investigations) are typically punished by administrative discipline, rather than criminal prosecutions, and McCabe's attorneys asserted he was being singled out. The grand jury apparently declined to indict McCabe, and in September 2019 former DOJ inspector general Michael Bromwich, representing McCabe, wrote a letter to Jessie Liu, the US Attorney for the District of Columbia, stating "It is clear that no indictment has been returned" by the grand jury, based on press reports and a discussion he had had with the prosecutors involved in the case, Joseph Cooney and Molly Gaston. Such an outcome would be highly unusual, as grand juries return indictments for nearly all cases brought to them. Consequently, a failure to secure a grand jury indictment—which may require only a simple majority decision based solely on evidence presented by the government—could prove embarrassing to the DOJ, as it suggests the government's case could not win a unanimous trial jury verdict. McCabe's attorneys asserted the DOJ should drop the investigation if the grand jury did not return an indictment. The New York Times reported that two prosecutors on the case had recently left the DOJ, which is unusual in a case nearing an indictment, with one of the attorneys expressing reservations about the merits of the DOJ case. The Times also noted political undertones of the case, as McCabe had authorized the investigation into whether Trump had obstructed justice, and as a result he had become a frequent target of Trump's ire. McCabe filed a wrongful termination suit against the DOJ in August 2019, asserting his firing was intended to remove officials who had been deemed insufficiently loyal to Trump.

In August 2019, McCabe filed a wrongful termination lawsuit against the Department of Justice, saying his firing, which took effect only hours before his scheduled retirement, was the result of Trump's improper political interference. His suit says he is "entitled to his full law enforcement pension and all other benefits, privileges, and rights currently being withheld".

In early 2019, Attorney General William Barr assigned prosecutor John Durham to conduct an inquiry into the origins of the Crossfire Hurricane investigation. On September 30, 2019, it was reported that Durham had offered McCabe a plea deal that McCabe had rejected. McCabe and his attorneys denied having been offered the plea deal. In a court proceeding the same day, Federal Judge Reggie B. Walton heard arguments stemming from a July 30, 2018, lawsuit filed by Citizens for Responsibility and Ethics in Washington because the FBI had been unresponsive to its March Freedom of Information Act (FOIA) request. The DOJ had requested an exemption from FOIA because "records or information could reasonably be expected to interfere with enforcement proceedings." Walton told federal prosecutors that they needed to either file charges against McCabe or drop the investigation, saying "This is just dragging too long." Walton gave prosecutors a November 15, 2019, deadline to file charges, saying he would order the release of the documents after that date if no charges had been filed. In a November 14, 2019, hearing, Walton excoriated prosecutors, suggesting they were stalling a decision whether to charge McCabe by using a "smoke screen" to deceive the court and continue the hold on the release of the documents, which he released.

In December 2019, Trump nominated the DOJ official with oversight on the case, Liu, to serve as an undersecretary in the Treasury Department. The following month, Liu determined there was insufficient evidence to indict McCabe, and on February 1, 2020, she was transferred to the Treasury Department to await her confirmation, as Barr replaced her with his close advisor Timothy Shea. Hearings for the confirmation were scheduled to begin on February 14. On February 11, Trump abruptly withdrew her nomination, and she resigned from the government the next day. On February 14, 2020, the DOJ advised McCabe's attorneys that he would not be prosecuted. Later that day, The Hill said: "(S)ome have questioned whether the decision Friday to drop possible charges is an attempt to quell controversy surrounding the Justice Department's recommended sentencing for longtime Trump aide Roger Stone, which was reduced after complaints by the president." The Hill also quoted McCabe himself saying: “I don’t think I’ll ever be free of this President and his maniacal rage that he’s directed towards me and my wife since October of 2016 for absolutely no reason whatsoever."-In a February 15, 2020, tweet, Trump stated: "IG RECOMMENDED MCCABE’S FIRING" The OIG made no such recommendation, having stated at the end of its report: "The OIG is issuing this report to the FBI for such action that it deems to be appropriate."

On October 14, 2021, the Justice Department reversed McCabe's firing, settling a lawsuit he filed asserting he was dismissed for political reasons. Under the terms of the settlement, the government agreed to "rescind and vacate" McCabe's removal and correct its records to reflect that McCabe retired in good standing on March 19, 2018, as deputy director, and to pay his pension as well as $200,000 in missed pension payments. The government also agreed to pay more than $500,000 in legal fees McCabe had incurred and expunge any record of his being fired from FBI personnel records. On October 27, 2021, Attorney General Merrick Garland testified about McCabe's lawsuit at an oversight hearing before the Senate Judiciary Committee, stating that the DOJ lawyers defending the case "concluded that they needed to settle the case because of a likelihood of loss on the merits."

In July 2022, The New York Times reported that both McCabe and Comey had been selected for the most invasive type of IRS audit after they had been fired from the FBI. The matter was referred to a Treasury Department inspector general on the day after the report. The Times said that the odds of anyone being selected for such an audit are very low, and the odds of the two top former FBI officials both being selected by chance were "minuscule". According to tax experts, both had an increased chance of being randomly selected for research audits because their incomes increased after their FBI careers ended – McCabe by his CNN punditry and Comey by his book deals and paid speeches. The Times reported in November 2022 that Trump's former chief of staff John Kelly said the president told him Comey and McCabe were among his perceived political enemies he wanted to "get the IRS on". Trump denied being involved in the audits. An investigation by the Treasury Inspector General for Tax Administration (TIGTA) concluded that the audits were in fact randomly selected and not political retribution.

== Commentary ==
In August 2019, McCabe was hired by CNN as contributor, drawing criticism from media critics and conservatives.In August 2020, George Mason University announced McCabe would be joining the faculty of the Schar School of Policy and Government as distinguished visiting professor. In December 2022, shortly after the appointment of special counsel Jack Smith to investigate former Pres. Trump's mishandling of classified documents, McCabe teamed up with podcaster Allison Gill, of Mueller, She Wrote fame, on a new podcast series, Jack, to follow the case. After the Smith investigation ended, McCabe and Gill started UnJustified to follow the actions of the DOJ during Trump's second presidential term.

== Personal life ==
McCabe is married to Jill McCabe, a physician specializing in pediatrics, who was the Democratic candidate for Virginia's 13th Senate District in 2015. They have two children. He is a triathlete who occasionally biked 35 miles (56 km) to work from his home in Ashburn, Virginia. When biking to work, he and his friend would switch off driving while the other biked. The one who did not bike would then drive both home at day's end.

== Works ==
External videos
- After Words interview with McCabe on The Threat, March 2, 2019, C-SPAN

- The Threat: How the FBI Protects America in the Age of Terror and Trump (St. Martin's Press, released February 19, 2019) ISBN 9781250207579

== See also ==
- Russian interference in the 2016 United States elections

Government offices
Preceded by Kevin Perkins	Associate Deputy Director of the Federal Bureau of Investigation; 2015–2016	Succeeded by David Bowdich
Preceded by Mark F. Giuliano	Deputy Director of the Federal Bureau of Investigation; 2016–2018	Succeeded by David Bowdich
Preceded by James Comey	Director of the Federal Bureau of Investigation; Acting; 2017	Succeeded by Christopher A. Wray
