= Timothy P. Murphy =

American law enforcement officer, FBI deputy director

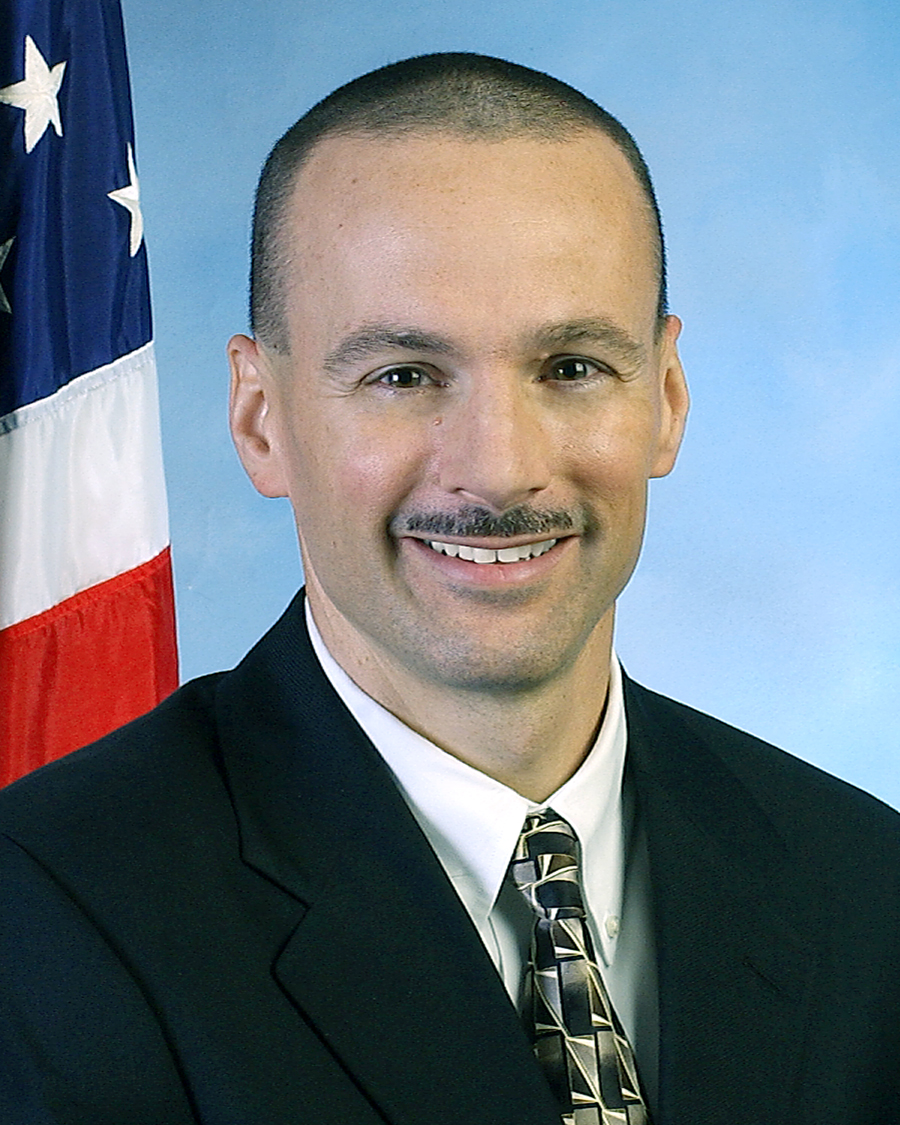

14th Deputy Director of the Federal Bureau of Investigation
- In office July 8, 2010 – August 31, 2011
- President: Barack Obama
- Director: Robert Mueller
- Preceded by: John S. Pistole
- Succeeded by: Sean M. Joyce

Associate Deputy Director of the Federal Bureau of Investigation
- In office January 23, 2008 – July 8, 2010
- Preceded by: Joseph L. Ford
- Succeeded by: Thomas J. Harrington

Personal details
- Education: Ferris State University

Timothy P. Murphy is an American law enforcement officer and a former Deputy Director of the Federal Bureau of Investigation. Murphy joined the FBI in September 1988. He has formerly served in FBI field posts in cities such as Newark, Tampa, Washington, DC, and Cincinnati along with several post at FBI Headquarters. Murphy has investigative experience in a number of matters including counterterrorism, organized crime and drug trafficking. His experience also expands into undercover and surveillance work. Murphy's executive experience includes being the special agent in charge of the Washington Field Office, special agent in charge of the Cincinnati Division, and a member of the Director's Special Agent in Charge Advisory Committee.

Murphy graduated from Ferris State University. He retired as Deputy Director of the FBI on August 31, 2011.

Currently, Murphy is CEO of Consortium Networks and serves on the Board of Directors for Apifiny, Western Union, and the nonprofit National Center for Missing and Exploited Children. He is a former director of Genius Group.

Government offices
Preceded by Joseph L. Ford	Associate Deputy Director of the Federal Bureau of Investigation; 2008–2010	Succeeded by Thomas J. Harrington
Preceded by John S. Pistole	Deputy Director of the Federal Bureau of Investigation; 2010–2011	Succeeded by Sean M. Joyce
