= Rick Tippe =

Canadian country music artist

- Born: Ricky Clarence Tippe; December 21, 1958 (age 67)
- Origin: Maple Ridge, British Columbia, Canada
- Genres: Country
- Occupation: Singer-songwriter
- Instruments: Vocals, guitar
- Years active: 1992–2011
- Labels: Moon Tan Music
- Website: ricktippe.com

Ricky Clarence "Rick" Tippe (born December 21, 1958) is a Canadian country music artist. Tippe has released seven albums on Moon Tan Music, including a greatest hits collection in 2000. His highest-charting single, "The Craziest Thing," peaked at No. 9 in 1996. He has won more than 25 awards from the British Columbia Country Music Association, including three consecutive Entertainer of the Year wins from 2001 to 2003. Tippe has toured across the United States, the United Kingdom and Australia, and opened for artists such as Tracy Byrd, Terri Clark, Mark Chesnutt and Sawyer Brown.

== Biography ==
Rick Tippe is the son of Canadian Country Music Hall of Fame and British Columbia Country Music Association Hall of Fame inductee Elmer Tippe. He released his first EP, After All These Years, on Ric'n'Rol Music in 1992. Two years later, he released his first studio album, 1994's Should'a Seen Her Comin'. The album produced six charting singles, including Tippe's first Top 20 song, "Two Broken Hearted Fools." Its follow-up, 1996's Get Hot or Go Home, produced another five Top 20 singles, including Tippe's highest-charting single, "The Craziest Thing." Tippe was named Male Vocalist of the Year by the BCCMA in 1996, his first of eight consecutive wins in the category.

Tippe's third studio album, Shiver 'n' Shake, was released in 1998. All four of its singles reached the Top 20 on the RPM Canadian country singles chart. Also in 1998, Tippe was named Independent Male Vocalist of the Year by the Canadian Country Music Association. Tippe's first greatest hits collection, The Best of Rick Tippe, was released in 2000. Proceeds from one of the album's singles, "Keepin' the Faith," have raised more than $25,000 for the Canadian Cancer Society. Tippe swept the 2001 BCCMA Awards, winning Entertainer of the Year, Male Vocalist of the Year, Album of the Year (The Best of Rick Tippe), Song of the Year ("Keepin' the Faith"), Single of the Year ("Keepin' the Faith") and the inaugural Video of the Year Award ("Keepin' the Faith").

Following the release of 2002's Singin' a Different Tune, Tippe took a break from recording. During his hiatus, he was commissioned by Mattel to write, produce and perform a song for the 35th anniversary of Hot Wheels. He began work on an album with his father, Elmer, in 2006. When Elmer suffered an unexpected stroke in November 2006, the project was put on hold. While his dad recovered, Tippe began work on his sixth studio album. His first album in six years, The Power of One was released in the summer of 2008. Its first single, "Long Way to Paradise," was released in September 2007.

On November 9, 2014, Rick Tippe was inducted into the BCCMA Hall of Fame.

=== Retirement ===
On August 12, 2011, Tippe performed his last concert, and one week later he opened a commercial truck repair company, Dynamic PowerTrain, with his two sons, Cameron and Tyler, in Maple Ridge. In an August 30, 2014 interview with the Maple Ridge & Pitt Meadows Times, Tippe says his auto repair business is currently his main focus, leaving him little time for music. "I hardly play the guitar, I hardly sing. I don't have time," he says. Tippe said he might get back into music again one day, but is unsure if it will happen.

== Discography ==
=== Studio albums ===
Title	Details
Should'a Seen Her Comin'	Release date: 1994; Label: Moon Tan
Get Hot or Go Home	Release date: 1996; Label: Moon Tan
Shiver 'n' Shake	Release date: 1998; Label: Moon Tan
Stampede Strut	Release date: 1999; Label: Moon Tan
Singin' a Different Tune	Release date: 2002; Label: Moon Tan
The Power of One	Release date: 2008; Label: Moon Tan

=== Extended plays ===
Title	Details
After All These Years	Release date: 1992; Label: Ric'n'Rol Music

=== Compilation albums ===
Title	Details
The Best of Rick Tippe	Release date: December 5, 2000; Label: Moon Tan

=== Singles ===
==== 1990s ====
Year	Single	Peak positions	Album
Year	Single	CAN Country	Album
1992	"Long Gone"	—	After All These Years
1992	"After All These Years"	60	After All These Years
1993	"If You're Lookin' for the One"	—	After All These Years
1994	"Should'a Seen Her Comin'"	42	Should'a Seen Her Comin'
1994	"Bad Heart Day"	51	Should'a Seen Her Comin'
1995	"Love Don't Get Better"	27	Should'a Seen Her Comin'
1995	"Two Broken Hearted Fools"	16	Should'a Seen Her Comin'
1995	"She Could Have It All"	40	Should'a Seen Her Comin'
1996	"The Wheel of Love (Is a Lifetime Ride)"	25	Should'a Seen Her Comin'
1996	"The Craziest Thing"	9	Get Hot or Go Home
1997	"You're All I Need"	25	Get Hot or Go Home
1997	"The Real Thing"	15	Get Hot or Go Home
1997	"Get Hot or Go Home"	10	Get Hot or Go Home
1998	"Never Givin' Up"	14	Get Hot or Go Home
1998	"She Made Me an Offer"	20	Get Hot or Go Home
1999	"Triple Threat"	12	Shiver 'n' Shake
1999	"Shiver 'n' Shake"	10	Shiver 'n' Shake
1999	"More Where That Came From"	14	Shiver 'n' Shake
"—" denotes releases that did not chart

==== 2000s ====
Year	Single	Album
2000	"When You Say Jump"^{[A]}	Shiver 'n' Shake
2000	"Keepin' the Faith"	The Best of Rick Tippe
2001	"Mad Love"	The Best of Rick Tippe
2001	"The Future Is Lookin' Brighter"	The Best of Rick Tippe
2002	"Singin' a Different Tune"	Singin' a Different Tune
2002	"I'll Do Anything"	Singin' a Different Tune
2003	"Why Can't We Be Friends?"	Singin' a Different Tune
2003	"Back to the Country"	Singin' a Different Tune
2004	"Surrender"	Singin' a Different Tune
2004	"Works for Me"	—N/a
2004	"The Luckiest Guy"	—N/a
2007	"Long Way to Paradise"	The Power of One
2008	"Forever"	The Power of One
2008	"Radio On"	The Power of One
2009	"Last Call"	The Power of One

Notes

- A "When You Say Jump" peaked at number 16 on the Canadian RPM Country Tracks chart.

=== Music videos ===
Year	Video	Director
1995	"She Could Have It All"	
1996	"The Wheel of Love (Is a Lifetime Ride)"	Ulf Buddensieck
1996	"The Craziest Thing"	Ulf Buddensieck
1997	"You're All I Need"	
1997	"Get Hot or Go Home"	Stephano Barberis
1998	"Never Givin' Up"	Stephano Barberis
1999	"Triple Threat"	Stephano Barberis
1999	"Shiver 'n' Shake"	Stephano Barberis
1999	"More Where That Came From"	Stephano Barberis
2000	"Keepin' the Faith"	Stephano Barberis
2001	"The Future Is Lookin' Brighter"	Stephano Barberis
2002	"Singin' a Different Tune"	Stephano Barberis
2002	"I'll Do Anything"	Stephano Barberis
2008	"The King of Honky Tonks and Cool"	
2008	"Forever"	
2009	"The Power of One (I Believe)"	
