= Brian Turner (footballer, born 1930) =

Australian rules footballer

Personal information
- Full name: Brian Turner
- Born: 18 June 1930 (age 96)
- Original team: St Ignatius
- Height: 175 cm (5 ft 9 in)
- Weight: 71 kg (157 lb)

Playing career^{1}
Years	Club	Games (Goals)
1950–52	Richmond	20 (8)
- ^{1} Playing statistics correct to the end of 1952.

Brian Turner (born 18 June 1930) is a former Australian rules footballer who played with Richmond in the Victorian Football League (VFL).

He later played for Box Hill Football Club in the Victorian Football Association and in 1954 was appointed captain coach of Bairnsdale Football Club, but Box Hill refused to issue him a clearance.
