= The Threat (memoir) =

2019 book by Andrew McCabe

The Threat: How the FBI Protects America in the Age of Terror and Trump
- Author: Andrew McCabe
- Subjects: Ethics, leadership
- Genre: Memoir
- Published: February 19, 2019
- Publisher: St. Martin's Press
- Publication place: United States
- Media type: Print, e-book, audiobook
- ISBN: 978-1-250-20757-9 (Hardcover)
- Dewey Decimal: 363.25092 B
- LC Class: HV8144.F43 M386 2019

The Threat: How the FBI Protects America in the Age of Terror and Trump is a memoir written by Andrew McCabe, the former Deputy Director of the Federal Bureau of Investigation (FBI). The book was published by St. Martin's Press on February 19, 2019.

== Background and development ==
McCabe was fired from the FBI in March 2018. That September, St. Martin's Press announced they had acquired the rights to publish a book written by McCabe. It was initially scheduled for release in December 2018, but a review of the book by the FBI delayed its release until February. The Atlantic published an excerpt of the book on February 14.

== Contents ==
In the book, McCabe accuses President Donald Trump of acting like a mob boss and for the "strain of insanity" he has created in the United States government. McCabe discussed the dismissal of James Comey, the former director of the FBI. He states that Rod Rosenstein, the former Deputy Attorney General of the United States, opposed the memo he wrote justifying the firing of Comey, though he publicly supported it. After the firing, McCabe became acting director of the FBI, and describes in the book steps he took to ensure the investigation of Russian interference in the 2016 elections could continue even if he was fired, eventually leading to the Special Counsel investigation. McCabe said that Trump and White House Counsel Don McGahn offered him protection in return for his personal loyalty. The memoir states that Trump said of Venezuela that "That’s the country we should be going to war with, they have all that oil and they’re right on our back door.”

== See also ==
- Russian interference in the 2016 United States elections
