= Sean M. Joyce =

American law enforcement officer

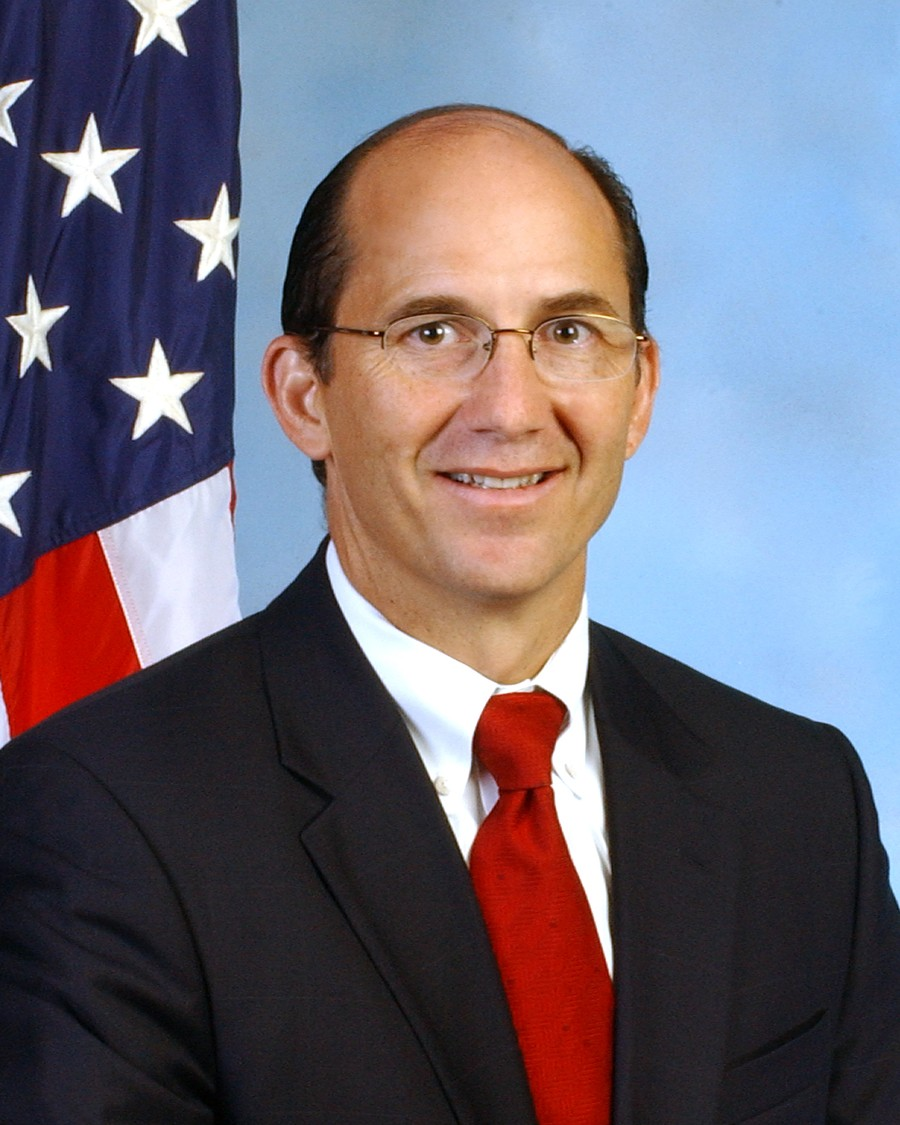

15th Deputy Director of the Federal Bureau of Investigation
- In office September 1, 2011 – December 1, 2013
- President: Barack Obama
- Director: Robert Mueller; James Comey
- Preceded by: Timothy P. Murphy
- Succeeded by: Mark F. Giuliano

Personal details
- Born: 1961 (age 64–65)
- Education: Boston College (BBA, BS); Dartmouth College (MBA)

Sean M. Joyce (born 1961) was the 15th Deputy Director of the Federal Bureau of Investigation.

== Early life and education ==
A Brockton, Massachusetts native, Joyce earned an undergraduate degree in Business Administration and Computer Science from Boston College followed by an MBA from the Tuck School of Business of Dartmouth College. Joyce worked as an Analyst at Raytheon and an Experienced Senior at Arthur Andersen prior to joining the FBI in 1987.

== Career ==
=== Public Sector Experience ===
Joyce began his career as an FBI special agent in 1987. Following the completion of training at the FBI Academy in Quantico, Virginia, he was assigned to the Dallas Division where he investigated Violent Crimes. He later investigated Colombian narcotics matters in the Miami Division and in 1994, Joyce was selected as a member of the Bureau’s Hostage Rescue Team.

In 1998, Joyce returned to the Dallas Field Office and became a special agent and SWAT team leader. He earned the Attorney General’s Award for Exceptional Service in 2004 for his work on a Dallas Division counterterrorism squad. He received the same award again a year later for his work on another counterterrorism matter.

Joyce was designated legal attaché to Prague in August 2005, and in 2007, received an award for investigative excellence for his work there. In 2007, he was assigned to the Washington Field Office as an assistant special agent in charge. The following year he was named section chief of the Counterterrorism Division’s International Terrorism Operations Section, with responsibility for international terrorism matters within the United States.

In 2009, Joyce was appointed assistant director of the FBI’s International Operations Division. As assistant director, he was responsible for employees in 75 foreign and domestic locations in support of the FBI’s international mission to defeat national security and criminal threats by building a global network of trusted partners and strengthening the FBI’s international capabilities.

In April 2010, Joyce was appointed executive assistant director (EAD) of the FBI’s National Security Branch (NSB), composed of the Counterterrorism Division, Counterintelligence Division, Directorate of Intelligence, and the Weapons of Mass Destruction Directorate.

Joyce was appointed the 15th Deputy Director for the FBI in September 2011. In this position Joyce had direct oversight of the FBI's 36,000 employees and its $8 billion annual budget. With more than 26 years of service in the FBI, Joyce brought a wide range of operational and leadership experience. He was an integral part of transforming the FBI into an intelligence-driven organization. In addition, he spearheaded several strategic initiatives including ‘next generation cyber,’ which was a cross-organizational initiative to maintain the FBI’s world leadership in law enforcement and domestic intelligence. He also established a framework to operate and evaluate the FBI’s 56 domestic field offices.

=== Post-FBI career ===
Joyce, is currently a Principal in PricewaterhouseCoopers' (PwC) Advisory Practice, where he is the Global and U.S.Cybersecurity, Privacy and Forensics Leader and a member of the U.S. Advisory Leadership Team.

During his time at PwC, Joyce has worked with many clients in various sectors providing strategic guidance, investigative support, technological changes, incident breach response and cybersecurity advice. Most notably, Joyce has consulted in some of the most prolific cyber breaches, providing guidance and expertise to top executives. Joyce has also briefed many boards and senior executives on the challenges posed by the digital revolution, including the threat landscape, best practices in governance and lines of defense, and how to use cybersecurity and resiliency as business enablers.

As the Global Cybersecurity, Privacy and Forensics Leader, Joyce is responsible for overseeing over 4,500 staff globally. In addition, he has spearheaded several strategic initiatives including the Cybersecurity and Privacy Innovation Institute which provides key research, perspectives, and analysis on trends affecting the industry.

Additionally, Joyce previously led the US and Global Financial Crimes Unit for PwC, focusing on the interplay between cybersecurity, anti-money laundering and sanctions, fraud, and anti-bribery/anti-corruption.

Prior to rejoining PwC, Joyce was the Chief Trust Officer at Airbnb where he led Design Specialists, Product Managers, Engineers and Data Scientists to help grow and defend the platform. Also, he had responsibility for Privacy and Community Policy. Joyce was also a member of the Airbnb Executive Committee.

Joyce is also a member of the Aspen Institute Cybersecurity Working Group, a cross-sector public-private forum dedicated to addressing cybersecurity challenges.

In May 2019, Airbnb hired Joyce as its first Chief Trust Officer, charged with protecting user safety on the platform. Joyce grew alarmed that Airbnb was not being fully transparent about the data it shared about millions of users with the Chinese government, including for Americans traveling in China. Six months after his hire, Joyce resigned over a "difference in values" with the company. Airbnb co-founder Nathan Blecharczyk reportedly told Joyce that "We're not here to promote American values," weeks before Joyce's resignation. Joyce subsequently returned to PwC.

== Honors and awards ==
Joyce is a 2013 recipient of the Director of National Intelligence Distinguished Service Medal, the CIA Director’s Award, the DIA’s Director’s Award, the FBI Meritorious Medal, Attorney General’s Award for Exceptional Service and the 2011 Presidential Rank Award, among other honors.

Political offices
Preceded by Timothy P. Murphy	Deputy Director of the Federal Bureau of Investigation; 2011–2013	Succeeded by Mark F. Giuliano
