= Triple Threat (Rick Tippe song) =

Single by Rick Tippe

from the album Shiver 'n' Shake
- Released: 1999
- Genre: Country
- Length: 3:24
- Label: Moon Tan
- Songwriter: Rick Tippe
- Producers: Rick Tippe; Chris Rolin; Raymond Arthur Harvey

Rick Tippe singles chronology
"She Made Me an Offer" (1998)	"Triple Threat" (1999)	"Shiver 'n' Shake" (1999)

"Triple Threat" is a song recorded by Canadian country music artist Rick Tippe. It was released in 1999 as the first single from his third studio album, Shiver 'n' Shake. It peaked at number 12 on the RPM Country Tracks chart in May 1999.

== Chart performance ==
Chart (1999)	Peak position
Canada Country Singles (RPM)	12

=== Year-end charts ===
Chart (1999)	Position
Canada Country Tracks (RPM)	86
