= Mark F. Giuliano =

American law enforcement officer (1961–2024)

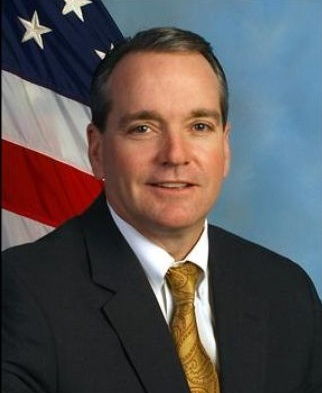
- Official portrait, 2013

16th Deputy Director of the Federal Bureau of Investigation
- In office December 1, 2013 – February 1, 2016
- President: Barack Obama
- Preceded by: Sean M. Joyce
- Succeeded by: Andrew McCabe

Personal details
- Born: Mark Francis Giuliano; May 28, 1961 Erie, Pennsylvania, U.S.
- Died: March 2, 2024 (aged 62) Decatur, Georgia, U.S.
- Cause of death: Heart attack
- Spouse: Judith McDonough (m. 1988)
- Children: 3
- Education: College of Wooster (BA)

Mark Francis Giuliano (May 28, 1961 – March 2, 2024) was an American law enforcement official. He served as the 16th Deputy Director of the Federal Bureau of Investigation (FBI) from December 1, 2013, until his retirement from the FBI on February 1, 2016. He earlier oversaw the bureau's Ten Most Wanted programs.

== Early life ==
Giuliano was born in Erie, Pennsylvania, on May 28, 1961. His father retailed men's shirts for a living; his mother was a housewife. Giuliano was the oldest of nine children and was raised in Middleburg Heights, Ohio. He attended St. Edward High School outside Cleveland, graduating in 1979. He then studied economics at the College of Wooster, where he also played for its football team, and obtained a bachelor's degree in 1983. He subsequently worked at The J.M. Smucker Company for four years, initially as a line supervisor before being promoted to plant manager.

== Career ==
Giuliano joined the FBI's Washington, D.C. field office as a Special Agent in 1988, where he worked on the Safe Streets and Gang Task Force, and served on SWAT as an Assault Team Leader. While there, he received the Director's Award for Excellence in Investigation. In 1997, he was promoted to Supervisory Special Agent in the Violent Crimes Section at FBI headquarters, where he was responsible for the fugitive and Ten Most Wanted programs.

From 2005 to 2010, Giuliano served in the FBI Atlanta Field Office, Atlanta, Georgia, and during his tenure there, he served in Afghanistan as the FBI Commander on the scene. From 2010 to 2011, he served as the assistant director of the FBI Counterterrorism Division within the National Security Branch. From 2011 to 2012, he served as the executive assistant director of the FBI National Security Branch. From August 2012 to November 2013, he served as the Special Agent in Charge (SAC) of the FBI Atlanta Field Office.

After retiring from the FBI in 2016, Giuliano joined Invesco as the company's chief security officer in Atlanta. He served as chief administrative officer and managing director of the company.

Giuliano was portrayed by Brian d'Arcy James in the 2020 miniseries The Comey Rule, which tells the story of the FBI's investigation into the Hillary Clinton email controversy and subsequent investigation into Russian interference in the 2016 United States elections.

== Personal life ==
Giuliano married Judith McDonough in 1988. They met while he was working at Smucker's and remained married until his death. Together, they had three children.

Giuliano died on March 2, 2024, at his home in Decatur, Georgia. He was 62, and had a heart attack prior to his death.

Political offices
Preceded by Sean M. Joyce	Deputy Director of the Federal Bureau of Investigation; 2013–2016	Succeeded by Andrew McCabe
