= Clint Watts =

Research fellow at the Foreign Policy Research Institute

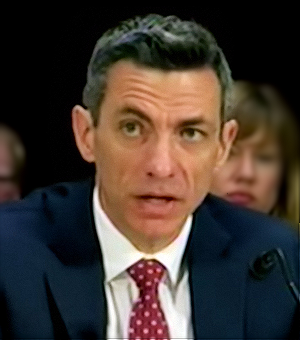
- Watts in March 2017
- Born: Clinton Wayne Watts; O'Fallon, Missouri
- Education: United States Military Academy (B.S.); Middlebury Institute of International Studies (M.A.)
- Occupations: National security analyst Formerly: United States Army officer, Special Agent for Federal Bureau of Investigation
- Years active: 1995–present
- Employer(s): Foreign Policy Research Institute; Alliance For Securing Democracy; MSNBC
- Known for: Senate Intelligence Committee testimony about Russian interference in the 2016 U.S. elections

Clint Watts is a senior fellow at the Center for Cyber and Homeland Security at George Washington University and a Foreign Policy Research Institute fellow. He previously was an infantry officer in the United States Army, and was the Executive Officer of the Combating Terrorism Center at United States Military Academy at West Point (CTC). He became a Special Agent for the Federal Bureau of Investigation where he served on the Joint Terrorism Task Force (JTTF). He has consulted for the FBI Counterterrorism Division (CTD) and FBI National Security Branch (NSB).

Watts has given expert testimony to the U.S. Congress multiple times, including: to the U.S. Senate Committee on Homeland Security and Governmental Affairs on April 5, 2016, about the ISIS's November 2015 Paris attacks and the 2016 Brussels bombings, to the U.S. House Committee on Foreign Affairs about ISIS after the Orlando nightclub shooting, to the Senate Intelligence Committee about Russian interference in the 2016 U.S. elections in a widely reported March 30, 2017 public hearing, and before the U.S. Senate Armed Services Subcommittee on Cybersecurity on April 27, 2017, about Russian black propaganda.

After his testimony before the Senate Intelligence Committee on Russian cyberwarfare tactics, CNN profiled him in a piece where they reported he himself was targeted by Russian information warfare after he documented Internet troll techniques.

== Education ==
Watts earned a Bachelor of Science degree from the United States Military Academy in 1995. He subsequently earned a Master of Arts degree from the Middlebury Institute of International Studies in 2005.

== Career ==
=== U.S. Army officer ===
Watts served in the United States Army as an officer in the infantry. He was the Executive Officer of the Combating Terrorism Center at United States Military Academy at West Point (CTC). After the September 11 attacks, he was recruited into the Federal Bureau of Investigation, to help coordinate efforts combating terrorism across multiple agencies.

=== FBI Agent ===
Watts worked as a Special Agent for the Federal Bureau of Investigation. In this capacity he served on the Joint Terrorism Task Force (JTTF). Watts has consulted for the FBI Counterterrorism Division (CTD) and FBI National Security Branch (NSB).

=== National security research ===
Watts testified as an expert witness about Russian interference in the 2016 U.S. elections, in a March 30, 2017 hearing before the Senate Intelligence Committee.

Watts is a Foreign Policy Research Institute (FPRI) fellow. He joined with FPRI in 2011, and became its Robert A. Fox fellow in the FPRI initiative focusing on Middle East studies. He is a senior fellow at the Center for Cyber and Homeland Security at George Washington University. He does consulting work and teaches for police agencies, intelligence sources, and the military.

Watts wrote for The Daily Beast in August 2016 that Russian propaganda fabricated articles were popularized by social media. Watts along with his colleague Andrew Weisburd documented how disinformation spread from Russia Today and Sputnik News, "the two biggest Russian state-controlled media organizations publishing in English", to pro-Russian accounts on Twitter. Citing research by Adrian Chen, Weisburd and Watts compared Russian tactics during the 2016 U.S. election to Soviet Union Cold War strategies. They referenced the 1992 United States Information Agency report to Congress, which warned about Russian propaganda called active measures They concluded social media made active measures easier.

Weisburd and Watts collaborated with colleague J.M. Berger and published a follow-up to their Daily Beast article in online magazine War on the Rocks, titled: "Trolling for Trump: How Russia is Trying to Destroy Our Democracy". They researched 7,000 pro-Trump accounts over a two-and-a-half year period. Their research detailed trolling techniques to denigrate critics of Russian activities in Syria, and proliferate lies about Clinton's health. Watts said Russia's goal was to elect Donald Trump as President of the United States and "to erode trust in mainstream media, public figures, government institutions". He claimed the propaganda targeted the alt-right, the right wing, and fascist groups. After each presidential debate, thousands of Twitter bots used hashtag #Trumpwon to change perceptions. In November 2016 the Foreign Policy Research Institute stated Russian propaganda exacerbated criticism of Clinton and support for Trump. The strategy involved social media, paid Internet trolls, botnets, and websites in order to denigrate Clinton.

In October 2020, Watts stated that "Russia is the threat from now to Election Day for influence. But in 2021 and beyond, it's China ... Around the world right now, China is really beating up the U.S. and advancing their vision of meritocracy over democracy, their vision of human rights versus the American vision of human rights, and maligning the U.S. about Covid-19 response. We have been tied up in our own politics. We've kind of missed how China has really advanced abroad."

In January 2013, Watts founded Miburo Solutions, a boutique consulting firm focused on the detection of and response to foreign information operations. On June 14, 2022, Microsoft announced they entered an agreement to acquire Miburo. The acquisition completed on July 1, 2022. As part of the acquisition, Watts joined Microsoft as General Manager, Digital Threat Analysis Center (DTAC).

== U.S. Congress testimony ==
Watts testified before the United States Senate Committee on Homeland Security and Governmental Affairs on April 5, 2016, about the Islamic State of Iraq and the Levant's November 2015 Paris attacks and the 2016 Brussels bombings. He submitted testimony to the United States House Committee on Foreign Affairs on June 23, 2016, on the subject of ISIS strategies, in the wake of the Orlando nightclub shooting.

He testified as an expert witness about Russian interference in the 2016 United States elections, in a March 30, 2017 hearing before the United States Senate Select Committee on Intelligence. CNN profiled him after the testimony in a piece "Russia investigation: Who is Clint Watts", where it was noted he gained knowledge in the field of Russian cyber hacking methods, after himself being a target in 2015 following his "Trolling for Trump" article; the FBI notified the Foreign Policy Research Institute of the attack. The American Interest. U.S. Senator Ron Wyden found the comment important to his investigation. After his testimony, he appeared on NBC's Meet the Press and explained ways the U.S. can better respond to cyberwarfare. Currently, he is a consultant and contributor to MSNBC.

He appeared before the United States Senate Armed Services Subcommittee on Cybersecurity on April 27, 2017, on the subject of cyber warfare and national security, where he spoke on strategies by Russia using black propaganda.

== Selected bibliography ==
- Watts, Clint (December 2011), "Capturing the Potential of Outlier Ideas in the Intelligence Community" (PDF), Studies in Intelligence, 55 (4)
- Watts, Clint (2012), Radicalization in the U.S. Beyond Al Qaeda: Treating the Disease of the Disconnection (PDF), Foreign Policy Research Institute, OCLC 940429317
- Watts, Clint (June 23, 2016), "Directing vs. Inspiring: ISIS' Evolving Tactics and the Orlando Terrorist Attack" (PDF), Statement Prepared for the United States House Of Representatives Committee On Foreign Affairs, Subcommittee on Terrorism, Nonproliferation and Trade, United States House of Representatives
- Watts, Clint (2018), Messing with the Enemy: Surviving in a Social Media World of Hackers, Terrorists, Russians, and Fake News, Harper, ISBN 978-0062795984

== See also ==
- Cyberwarfare by Russia
- Foreign electoral intervention
- Russian espionage in the United States
- Timeline of Russian interference in the 2016 United States elections
- Russian web brigades and Trolls from Olgino – Russian state-sponsored Internet sockpuppetry
