= FBI Intelligence Branch =

US FBI special division

Intelligence Branch
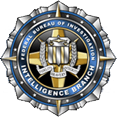
- Seal of the Intelligence Branch
- Active: August 2014 – present (12 years)
- Country: United States
- Agency: Federal Bureau of Investigation
- Headquarters: J. Edgar Hoover Building; Washington, D.C.
- Abbreviation: IB

Structure
- Subunits: Directorate of Intelligence; Office of Partner Engagement; Office of Private Sector

Commanders
- Current commander: Timothy Stone

Website
- Official website

The Intelligence Branch (IB) division of the Federal Bureau of Investigation (FBI) handles all intelligence functions, including information sharing policies and intelligence analysis for national security, homeland security, and law enforcement purposes. The IB operates through the use of embedded intelligence strategies.

The Intelligence Branch consists of language analysts, physical surveillance specialists, and FBI agents. The IB also oversees field intelligence operations through Field Intelligence Groups (FIGs), housed within various localized offices.

== Leadership ==
The Intelligence Branch of the FBI is headed by the executive assistant director for Intelligence Branch. The current executive assistant director is Timothy Stone.

== History ==
The operations of the FBI have significantly expanded and streamlined in the 21st century. The Intelligence Branch, as a distinct entity, came about in the wake of the September 11 terror attacks in 2001. Intelligence analysis became a critical focus for national security efforts, and the FBI Counterterrorism Division (CTD) soon evolved to include an Office of Intelligence (within CTD) in 2002. The 9/11 Commission recommended strengthening efforts to recognize the role intelligence played within the FBI's structure. Following the Intelligence Reform and Terrorism Prevention Act of 2004 being passed, United States Attorney General John Ashcroft ordered action on the development of an intelligence unit that would operate independently from the CTD. The Intelligence Branch was formally established in 2005. The IB, along with the CTD, the FBI Counterintelligence Division, and the FBI Weapons of Mass Destruction Directorate, became part of the newly established FBI National Security Branch in 2006. As of 2014, the IB is no longer part of NSB and now operates as a department of the FBI.

== Organization ==
- FBI Directorate of Intelligence
  - Analysis and Strategic Issues Branch
  - Intelligence Operations Branch
  - Intelligence Services Branch
- FBI Office of Private Sector
- FBI Office of Partner Engagement

== See also ==
- Central Intelligence Agency
- Federal Criminal Office (Germany)
- MI5
- Counter Terrorism Command (SO15)
- Direction de la surveillance du territoire (DST)
- General Commissariat of Information (CGI)
- Civil Guard Information Service (SIGC)
- Interpol
- Ministry of State Security (MSS)
