= FBI Files =

FBI Files may refer to:

- The FBI Files, American television docudrama series (1998–2006)
- FBI Files on Elvis Presley, records kept by the Federal Bureau of Investigation concerning Elvis Presley
- White House FBI files controversy, or Filegate, during the Clinton Administration
- FBI Silvermaster File, documents relating to FBI's investigation of Communist penetration of the Federal government during the Cold War
