= FBI Counterintelligence Division =

US FBI special division

Counterintelligence Division
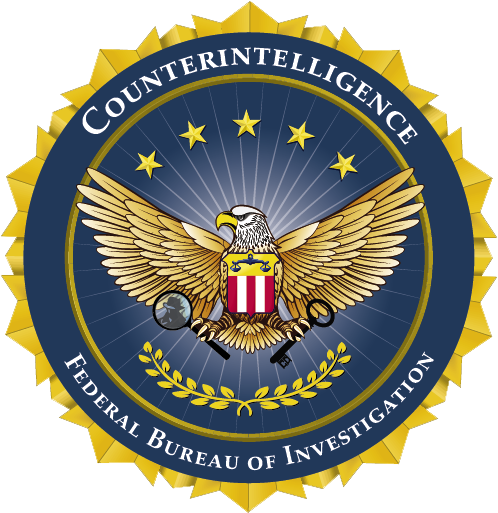
- FBI Counterintelligence logo
- Active: June 1939 – present (87 years)
- Country: United States
- Agency: Federal Bureau of Investigation
- Part of: National Security Branch
- Headquarters: J. Edgar Hoover Building; Washington, D.C.
- Abbreviation: CD

Commanders
- Current commander: Assistant Director Roman Rozhavsky

The Counterintelligence Division (CD) is a division of the National Security Branch of the Federal Bureau of Investigation. The division protects the United States against foreign intelligence operations and espionage. It accomplishes its mission of hunting spies and preventing espionage through the use of investigation and interaction with local law enforcement and other members of the United States Intelligence Community. In the wake of the September 11, 2001 attacks, the division's funding and manpower have significantly increased.

== Leadership ==
The Counterintelligence Division is headed by an assistant director, who reports to the executive assistant director (EAD) of the FBI National Security Branch (NSB).

The current NSB EAD is Larissa L. Knapp, who has been leading the NSB since May 23, 2022. FBI Director Christopher A. Wray appointed Knapp EAD.

On December 21, 2015 FBI Director James B. Comey named E. W. “Bill” Priestap assistant director of the Counterintelligence Division. Mr. Priestap most recently was deputy assistant director of the Intelligence Operations Branch in the Directorate of Intelligence at FBIHQ.

On February 19, 2019, FBI Director Christopher A. Wray named John Brown assistant director of the FBI Counterintelligence Division.

On April 24, 2020, FBI Director Christopher A. Wray named Alan E. Kohler Jr. assistant director of the FBI Counterintelligence Division.

On April 17, 2023, FBI Director Christopher A. Wray named Suzanne Turner assistant director of the FBI Counterintelligence Division.

== Organization ==
The Counterintelligence Division has three branches, each headed by a Deputy Assistant Director:

- Intelligence Branch
- China Branch
- Russia/Global Branch

Each branch oversees various sections, each headed by a Section Chief. Some sections include:

- Counterespionage (CE) Section – prevents foreign intelligence agencies from gathering and collecting intelligence. Investigation of media leaks and insider threats
- Counterproliferation Center (CPC) Section – detect, deter, and defeat the threat posed by state-sponsored groups, individuals, and organizations attempting to acquire weapons of mass destruction or other sensitive technologies
- Cyber Counterintelligence Coordination (C3S) Section – Leading the integration of Cyber and Counterintelligence Programs.
- Counterintelligence Training and Strategy Section – Manages the National Counterintelligence Task Force and some other programs.
- Global Section – Responsible for counterintelligence matters related to all countries except Russia and China.
- Infrastructure Vulnerability and Threat Assessment Center (IVTAC) Section
- China Operations (COS3) Section
- China Counterespionage and Technology Transfer (C2T2) Section
- Foreign Investment (FIU) Unit
- China Intelligence Section
- Russia Operations Section
- Strategic Resources Section
- Foreign Influence Task Force Section
- Counterintelligence Analysis Section
- Counterintelligence Cyberspace Operations Section
- Clandestine Operations Section

== History ==
The division was first established by FBI Director J. Edgar Hoover in 1939 as the General Intelligence Division, to handle foreign counterintelligence and other intelligence related investigations. In 1941, the unit was renamed the National Defense Division. In 1943, the division's name was once again changed, this time to Security Division. After 10 years of operating as the Security Division, the unit was renamed as the Domestic Security Division in 1953. In 1973, the organization became the Intelligence Division and in 1976 transferred some of its responsibilities, including domestic terrorism investigations, to the FBI's Criminal Investigative Division. In 1993, the unit was renamed the National Security Division (NSD). The following year, the responsibility for domestic terrorism moved back to the NSD. In 1999, the FBI's Counterterrorism Division was created and took over responsibility for terrorism related investigations. In 2001, the NSD was renamed the Counterintelligence Division and three other units were branched off, the Security Division, Cyber Division and the Office of Intelligence (later the Directorate of Intelligence).

== See also ==
- Central Intelligence Agency
- MI5
- Counter Terrorism Command (SO15)
- Direction de la surveillance du territoire (DST)
- General Commissariat of Information (CGI)
- Civil Guard Information Service (SIGC)
- Tokyo Metropolitan Police Department Public Security Bureau
- Intelligence Bureau
- INTERPOL
