= CXS (disambiguation) =

CXS is the ICAO code of Boston-Maine Airways.

CXS may also refer to:

- CXS, an Internet Protocol Television application developed by Select-TV
- Buick LaCrosse CXS, an automobile model
- Charge-exchange spectroscopy, a diagnostic used in plasma physics
- Communications Exploitation Section, a branch of the United States FBI Counterterrorism Division
