= National Domestic Communications Assistance Center =

The National Domestic Communications Assistance Center (NDCAC) is a National center, formed by the United States Federal Bureau of Investigation in 2012. The NDCAC's primary purpose is to develop technology to assist federal, state, and local law enforcement with technical knowledge regarding communication services, technologies, and electronic surveillance.
