= High-Value Detainee Interrogation Group =

U.S. government unit for interrogating important terrorism suspects

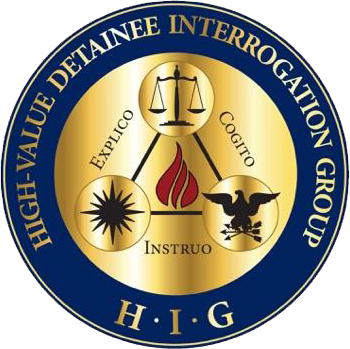
- Seal of the High-Value Detainee Interrogation Group
- Active: August 2009 – present (15 years)
- Country: United States
- Agency: Federal Bureau of Investigation; Central Intelligence Agency; Department of Defense
- Part of: National Security Branch (administrative)
- Abbreviation: HIG

Commanders
- Current commander: Lawrence Buckley
- Notable commanders: Eli Miranda George Piro Frazier Thompson

The High-Value Detainee Interrogation Group (HIG) is a U.S. three-agency intelligence-gathering entity that brings together intelligence professionals from the Federal Bureau of Investigation (FBI), the Central Intelligence Agency (CIA), and the United States Department of Defense (DoD). It is administratively housed within the FBI's National Security Branch.

The HIG was created by President Barack Obama in August 2009 with its charter written in April 2010. It was established to question terrorism suspects soon after their arrests, to quickly obtain information about accomplices and terrorism threats.

The group was to be responsible for interrogations overseas. In January 2010, the Director of National Intelligence Dennis Blair said that the group would begin interrogating people in the U.S. as well. The HIG claims to use authorized, lawful, non-coercive techniques and conducts research on the effectiveness of interrogation techniques and provides training for their interrogators, other U.S. Intelligence Community and law enforcement partners and allies abroad.

The HIG is administered by the FBI. The Director of the HIG is an FBI representative with two deputies, one from the DoD and the other from the CIA. The HIG is subject to oversight by the National Security Council, the Department of Justice, and by Congress.

The group's creation stopped a bureaucratic war between the CIA and the FBI over who had responsibility for interrogations.

HIG questioned Faisal Shahzad, a Pakistani-American citizen responsible for the 2010 Times Square car bombing attempt, Boston Marathon bombing suspect Dzhokhar Tsarnaev, and Benghazi terror suspect Ahmed Abu Khattala.
