= FBI Information and Technology Branch =

Information and Technology Branch
- Country: United States
- Agency: Federal Bureau of Investigation
- Abbreviation: ITB

Structure
- Subunits: IT Applications and Data Division; IT Infrastructure Division

Commanders
- Current commander: Acting Executive Assistant Director Michael Gavin

The Information and Technology Branch (ITB) is a service within the Federal Bureau of Investigation. The ITB is responsible for all FBI information technology needs and information management. ITB also promotes and facilitates the creation, sharing, and application of FBI knowledge products with the larger law enforcement community in order to improve overall nationwide crime fighting effectiveness.

== Leadership ==
Headed by an FBI executive assistant director, the ITB is responsible to the FBI Director through the Associate Deputy Director. As a unit of the FBI (which is a component of the United States Department of Justice), the ITB is ultimately responsible to the Attorney General of the United States.

The current ITB acting executive assistant director is Michael Gavin. The ITB executive assistant director previously served as the chief information officer of the FBI, but was spun off into its own office. The current chief information officer is Jonathan Moffa (acting).

== Organization ==
The Information and Technology Branch is formed by two divisions:

- IT Applications and Data Division
- IT Infrastructure Division
