= FBI Human Resources Branch =

Human Resources Branch
- Country: United States
- Agency: Federal Bureau of Investigation
- Abbreviation: HRB

Structure
- Subunits: Human Resources Division; Security Division; Training Division

Commanders
- Current commander: Executive Assistant Director Jennifer L. Moore

The Human Resources Branch (HRB) is a service within the Federal Bureau of Investigation (FBI). The HRB is responsible for all internal human resources needs of the FBI and for conducting the FBI Academy to train new FBI agents.

== Leadership ==
Headed by an FBI executive assistant director, the HRB is responsible to the FBI director through the associate director. As a unit of the FBI (which is a division of the United States Department of Justice), the HRB is ultimately responsible to the attorney general of the United States.

The current HRB executive assistant director is Andrew W. Vale, who was appointed by FBI director Christopher A. Wray in April 2017.

== Organization ==
The Human Resources Branch is made up of the following divisions:

- FBI Human Resources Division
- FBI Security Division
- FBI Training Division
