= M.K. Palmore =

American cybersecurity executive

- Born: Malcolm K. Palmore; 1969 (age 56–57); Washington, D.C.
- Education: United States Naval Academy; Pepperdine Graziadio Business School
- Occupations: Risk management executive, Cybersecurity advisor, Educator
- Employers: Apogee Global RMS; Google Cloud (2021-2025)
- Organization: Marines' Memorial Association (board of directors)
- Title: Founder & Principal Advisor, Apogee Global RMS and Professor of Practice at Thunderbird School of Global Management
- Website: https://mkpalmore.io/

Malcolm K. Palmore, simply referred to as M.K. Palmore (born 1969), is an American Risk management executive, cybersecurity advisor, and former FBI agent. He is the founder and principal advisor of Apogee Global RMS, a San Jose, California-based enterprise risk management advisory firm. He is also a Professor of Practice at the Thunderbird School of Global Management at Arizona State University.

Palmore previously served as a director in Google Cloud's Office of the Chief Information Security Officer (CISO) (2021–2025) and as vice president and field chief security officer for the Americas at Palo Alto Networks (2019–2021). Before joining private sector, Palmore spent more than a quarter of a century in public service, primarily with the U.S. Marine Corps and later with Federal Bureau of Investigation (FBI). He served as the head of the Cyber Security Branch at the FBI’s San Francisco field office.

== Early life and education ==
Palmore was born and raised in Washington, D.C. He attended the United States Naval Academy, earning a bachelor's degree in political science, and later obtained a Master of Business Administration (MBA) from Pepperdine Graziadio Business School. He holds the Certified Information Systems Security Professional (CISSP) credential and completed the CISO Executive Program at Carnegie Mellon University.

== Career ==
Palmore began his professional career in 1992 as a commissioned officer in the U.S. Marine Corps, serving in operations and logistics billets before leaving the service as a captain in 1997. From 1997 to 2019, Palmore served as a Special Agent with the Federal Bureau of Investigation (FBI). During the service, he led counterterrorism and cybercrime investigations, crisis management, and efforts to safeguard public safety and national security. He also held various leadership roles, including serving as head of the Cyber Security Branch at the San Francisco field office.

From 2019 to 2021, M.K. Palmore served as vice president and field chief security officer (Americas) at Palo Alto Networks. In 2021, Palmore joined Google Cloud as director of the Office of the Chief Information Security Officer (CISO). In this capacity, he helped organizations improve their cybersecurity resilience as they adopt cloud technology and leads efforts to align cybersecurity strategies with business goals. He held the role until 2025.

=== Apogee Global RMS ===
Palmore founded Apogee Global RMS in February 2018 as a practitioner-led enterprise risk management and leadership advisory firm headquartered in San Jose, California, and has led it on a full-time basis since June 2025. The firm's work is organized around Palmore's Nexus of Risk framework, which holds that cyber, physical, and human risk form a single consequence chain and should be governed as one discipline, drawing on the COSO Enterprise Risk Management framework and ISO 31000.

== Additional career ==
Palmore serves on the board of directors of the Marines' Memorial Association in San Francisco, a nonprofit that operates the Marines' Memorial Club and supports veterans and active-duty service members. In January 2024, Palmore was appointed as the president & member of the board of directors at Cyversity, a U.S. based nonprofit organization dedicated to increasing diversity in the cybersecurity field. He also serves on the Strategic Advisory Board of Dataminr, an event and risk detection firm.

== Public speaking ==
In 2023, Palmore participated in a panel titled "Ransom-where? The U.S. Cities Fighting Back Against Hackers" at TechCrunch Disrupt 2023. The discussion focused on the growing threat of ransomware attacks against local governments, schools, and hospitals, with a particular emphasis on how both local governments and startups can combat the increasing ransomware threat.

== Views ==
Palmore supports the implementation of a Zero Trust security architecture, emphasizing its ability to increase network visibility and reduce the risk of unwanted actions within an organization’s systems.
