= National Bureau of Criminal Identification =

Defunct law enforcement agency

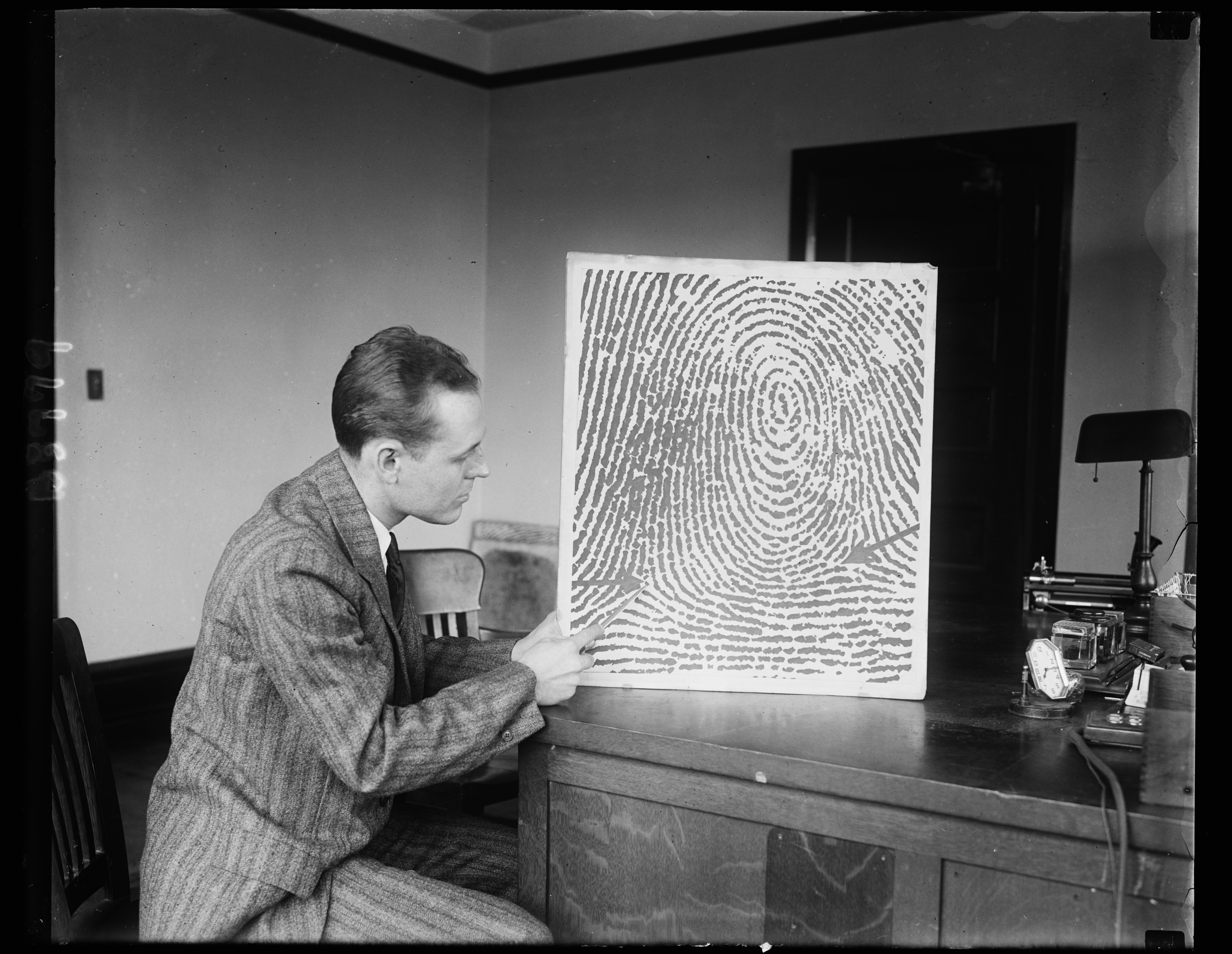
It is possible, according to E.K. Thode, chief of the National Division of Identification and Information, to reconstruct a fingerprint with positive accuracy

The National Bureau of Criminal Identification (NBCI), also called the National Bureau of Identification, was an agency founded by the National Chiefs of Police Union in 1896, and opened in 1897, to record identifying information on criminals and share that information with law enforcement. It was located in Chicago until 1902, at which point it was moved to Washington, D.C. William Pinkerton, co-director of the Pinkerton National Detective Agency, donated his agency's collection of photographs to the newfound agency. NBCI initially only collected photographs and Bertillon records, which limited the Bureau's effectiveness. Its effectiveness greatly increased when it began collecting fingerprints. NBCI ceased to exist as an independent organization when it was absorbed into the Federal Bureau of Investigation on July 26, 1908.
