= FBI National Security Branch =

US FBI national security unit

National Security Branch
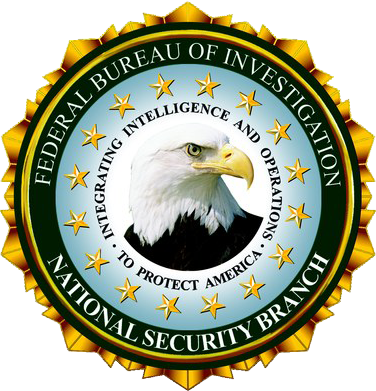
- Seal of the National Security Branch
- Active: September 12, 2005 – present (21 years, 2 months)
- Country: United States
- Agency: Federal Bureau of Investigation
- Headquarters: J. Edgar Hoover Building; Washington, D.C.
- Abbreviation: NSB

Structure
- Subunits: Counterintelligence Division; Counterterrorism Division; High-Value Detainee Interrogation Group; Terrorist Screening Center; Weapons of Mass Destruction Directorate

Commanders
- Current commander: Operations Director Jack Harrison

Website
- Official website

The National Security Branch (NSB) is a service within the Federal Bureau of Investigation. The NSB is responsible for protecting the United States from weapons of mass destruction, acts of terrorism, and foreign intelligence operations and espionage. The NSB accomplishes its mission by investigating national security threats, providing information and analysis to other law enforcement agencies, and developing capabilities to keep the US nation secure.

== Leadership ==
Headed by an FBI executive assistant director J.Harrison, the NSB responds to the FBI director through the deputy director. As a unit of the FBI (which is a division of the United States Department of Justice), the NSB is ultimately responsible to the attorney general of the United States. In addition, the critical role the NSB plays within the United States Intelligence Community places it within the purview of the director of national intelligence.

== Organization ==
Organizational chart for the NSB

The NSB was formed by the unification of the FBI's various national security and intelligence gathering units:

- FBI Counterterrorism Division
- FBI Counterintelligence Division
- FBI Weapons of Mass Destruction Directorate
- Terrorist Screening Center
- High-Value Detainee Interrogation Group

=== FBI Weapons of Mass Destruction Directorate ===
The Weapons of Mass Destruction Directorate (WMDD) addresses and investigates emerging threats the United States faces from the use of weapons of mass destruction. WMDD specifically consolidates all relevant FBI assets under one comprehensive program capable of detecting, deterring, and dismantling WMD programs. In the wake of the September 11, 2001 attacks, the Division's funding and manpower have significantly increased.

WMDD was established in July 2006.

The Weapons of Mass Destruction Directorate is headed by assistant director, who reports to the executive assistant director of the FBI National Security Branch. The current assistant director is Brian Boetig, who was appointed by FBI director Christopher A. Wray on August 14, 2018. Previously, John G. Perren, who was appointed by then FBI director Robert Mueller on May 10, 2012, held the position.

The Weapons of Mass Destruction Directorate has three sections:

- Intelligence and Analysis Section
- Countermeasures and Preparedness Section
- Investigations and Operations Section

== Future ==
It is speculated that this will lead to the formation of "career paths" for FBI special agents; meaning that once a new agent has completed Special Agent Training at the FBI Academy in Quantico, Virginia, and has completed the mandatory probationary period, that he or she can choose to go into the National Security Branch, or go into the "Criminal" part of the Bureau and focus on crimes such as organized crime, narcotics, civil rights violations, fraud, and violent crime. Advocates of this new program say that this re-organization will help the fight against terrorism by making it less bureaucratic.

== See also ==
- United States Department of Justice National Security Division
