= FBI files on Elvis Presley =

Extortion attempts against Elvis Presley

The US Federal Bureau of Investigation (FBI) kept files concerning the American singer Elvis Presley. They consist of 683 pages of copies of letters from members of the public commenting on his performances, newspaper clippings, and documents reporting that Presley was the target of extortion attempts.

== Complaints, death threats and extortion attempts ==
As rock singer Elvis Presley was a very popular star, J. Edgar Hoover's FBI had many files on him copied from FBI Headquarters in Washington, D.C., and today archived on CD-ROM. According to Thomas Fensch, the texts from the FBI reports dating from 1956 to 1981 represent a "microcosm [of Presley's] behind-the-scenes life." For instance, the FBI was interested in death threats made against the singer, the likelihood of Elvis being the victim of blackmail and particularly a "major extortion attempt" while he was in the United States Army in Germany, complaints from outraged persons about his public performances, a paternity suit, the theft by larceny of an executive jet which he owned and the alleged fraud surrounding a 1955 Corvette which he owned, and similar things. The files do not collect anything investigational toward Elvis Presley.

== A danger to the security of the United States ==
The files deal with the moral panic of the time of sexual drives of the American youth being aroused beyond normality by Elvis Presley. In a letter to J. Edgar Hoover dated May 16, 1956, for instance, a purported former member of the Army Intelligence Service states that Presley is a "definite danger to the security of the United States" because he had driven girls and boys mad. The letter says that Elvis's "actions and motions were such as to arouse the sexual passions of teenaged youth. One eye-witness described his actions as 'sexual self-gratification on stage,' – another as 'a strip-tease with clothes on.' The author further criticizes Elvis's "motions and gestures, like those of masturbation or riding a microphone," and adds that "Indications of the harm Presley did...were two high school girls (...) whose abdomen and thigh had Presley's autograph...It is known by psychologists, psychiatrists, and priests that teenaged girls from the age of eleven, and boys in their adolescence are easily aroused to sexual indulgence and perversion by certain types of motions and hysteria, – the type that was exhibited at the Presley show. There is also gossip of the Presley Fan Clubs that degenerate into sex orgies..From eye-witness reports about Presley, I would judge that he may possibly be a drug addict and a sexual pervert."

== Endeavor to denounce the Beatles, the Smothers Brothers and Jane Fonda ==
Ten days after Presley met with President Richard Nixon at the White House in 1970, the singer was granted a private tour of FBI headquarters. The FBI memo recounts Presley's visit and that he would like to advise FBI director Hoover "that The Beatles laid the groundwork for many of the problems we are having with young people by their filthy unkempt appearances and suggestive music while entertaining in this country during the early and middle 1960s." In Presley's opinion, the source for the disaffected youth of the day owed to the existence of "the Smothers Brothers, Jane Fonda, and other persons in the entertainment industry of their ilk" because they had "poisoned young minds by disparaging the United States in their public statements and unsavory activities." However, unlike Nixon, Hoover refused to meet with Presley, whom he described as "wearing of all sorts of exotic dress."

== A major extortion attempt ==
According to one of the best-documented files, Elvis Presley was the victim of Laurenz Johannes Griessel-Landau of Johannesburg, South Africa, a swindler and blackmailer who represented himself to be a medical doctor and skin specialist.

=== Details of the case ===
On 27 November 1959 Griessel-Landau was hired by Presley in Bad Nauheim, Germany, when the star was in the military service, to make skin treatments. However, during these treatments in December 1959, which involved Presley's shoulders and face and took place in the singer's quarters, the man had made several homosexual passes at the singer's friends from the Memphis Mafia and, according to Elvis biographer Peter Guralnick, at Elvis himself. According to the FBI files, Griessel-Landau

is alleged to have admitted to Presley that he is bisexual. His first homosexual experiences took place early in his life in the orphanage in which he was brought up. On 24 December 1959 Presley decided to discontinue the skin treatments. At the time that he told Griessel-Landau of this decision he also thoroughly censured Griessel-Landau for embarrassing him ...

This drove Griessel-Landau into rage and he decided to extort sums of money from the singer or to ruin his career. The case was referred to the FBI. Elvis "was interviewed on 28 December 1959 concerning his complaint that he was the victim of blackmail..." According to the FBI files, Griessel-Landau "threatened to expose Presley by photographs and tape recordings which are alleged to present Presley in compromising situations." An investigation determined that Griessel Landau was not a medical doctor.

=== Confidential treatment ===
Presley did not take the matter to court. According to the FBI files,

Information concerning the subject was furnished to this office by the Provost Marshal Division, Hqs., United States Army, Europe, with the indication that they wished to avoid any publicity in this matter since they did not want to involve Elvis Presley nor put him in an unfavorable light since Presley had been a first-rate soldier and had caused the army no trouble during his term of service.

=== Final negotiation ===
Because things did not turn out the way he expected, Griessel-Landau endeavored to play the case down in letters he wrote on 27 and 28 December claiming that he sympathized with Elvis and that he had decided not to take action against the singer. The FBI files say that finally,

By negotiation, Presley agreed to pay Griessel-Landau $200.00 for treatments received and also to furnish him with a $315.00 plane fare to London, England. Griessel-Landau agreed to depart to England on 25 December 1959 at 19.30 hours from Frankfurt, Germany. [But] Griessel-Landau did not leave as agreed, rather returned and demanded an additional $250.00, which Presley paid. A day later Griessel-Landau made a telephonic demand for 2,000 £ for the loss of his practice which he closed in Johannesburg, South Africa prior to his departure for Bad Nauheim to treat Presley.

Then the blackmailer departed Rhein-Main Air Field, Frankfurt, Germany at 16.00 hours, 6 January 1960 on Flight 491, British European Airway for London...He is alleged to be seeking entry into the United States. No contact between Presley and Griessel-Landau has been reported since 5 January.
