= Federal Bureau of Investigation =

U.S. federal law enforcement agency

- Federal Bureau of Investigation's seal

- FBI special agent badge

- Flag of the Federal Bureau of Investigation
- Abbreviation: FBI
- Motto: Fidelity, Bravery, Integrity

Agency overview
- Formed: July 26, 1908; 118 years ago (as the Bureau of Investigation)
- Employees: ≈38,000
- Annual budget: US$10,624,456,000 (FY 2026)

Jurisdictional structure
- Federal agency: United States
- Operations jurisdiction: United States
- General nature: Federal law enforcement

Operational structure
- Headquarters: J. Edgar Hoover Building; Washington, D.C., U.S.
- 38°53′43″N 77°01′30″W
- Agency executives: Kash Patel, Director; Andrew Bailey; Christopher Raia , Co-Deputy Director; J. William Rivers, Associate Deputy Director; Corey F. Ellis, Chief of Staff
- Parent agency: Department of Justice; Office of the Director of National Intelligence
- Divisions: Intelligence Branch; Counter-Terrorism Division; Cyber Division; Counter-Intelligence; National Investigative Division; International Operations; Office of Public Affairs

Website
- fbi.gov

The Federal Bureau of Investigation (FBI) is the domestic intelligence and security service of the United States and its principal federal law enforcement agency. An agency of the United States Department of Justice, the FBI is a member of the U.S. Intelligence Community and reports to both the attorney general and the director of national intelligence. A leading American counterterrorism, counterintelligence, and criminal investigative organization, the FBI has jurisdiction over violations of more than 200 categories of federal crimes. The FBI maintains a list of its top 10 most wanted fugitives.

Although many of the FBI's functions are unique, its activities in support of national security are comparable to those of the British MI5 and NCA and the Russian FSB. Unlike the Central Intelligence Agency (CIA), which has no law enforcement authority and is focused on intelligence collection abroad, the FBI is primarily a domestic agency, maintaining 56 field offices in major cities throughout the United States, and more than 400 resident agencies in smaller cities and areas across the nation. At an FBI field office, a senior-level FBI officer concurrently serves as the representative of the director of national intelligence.

Despite its domestic focus, the FBI also maintains a significant international footprint, operating 60 Legal Attache (LEGAT) offices and 15 sub-offices in U.S. embassies and consulates across the globe. These foreign offices exist primarily for the purpose of coordination with foreign security services and do not usually conduct unilateral operations in the host countries. The FBI can and does at times carry out secret activities overseas, just as the CIA has a limited domestic function. These activities generally require coordination across government agencies.

The FBI was established in 1908 as the Bureau of Investigation, the BOI or BI for short. Its name was changed to the Federal Bureau of Investigation (FBI) in 1935. The FBI headquarters is the J. Edgar Hoover Building in Washington, D.C.

== Mission, priorities and budget ==
FBI Domestic Investigations and Operations Guide (.pdf file)

=== Mission ===
The mission of the FBI is to "protect the American people and uphold the Constitution of the United States".

=== Priorities ===
Currently, the FBI's top priorities are:

- Protect the United States from terrorist attacks
- Protect the United States against foreign intelligence operations, espionage, and cyber operations
- Combat significant cybercriminal activity
- Combat public corruption at all levels
- Protect civil rights
- Combat transnational criminal enterprises
- Combat major white-collar crime
- Combat significant violent crime

=== Budget ===
In the fiscal year 2019, the Bureau's total budget was approximately $9.6 billion.

In the Authorization and Budget Request to Congress for fiscal year 2021, the FBI asked for $9,800,724,000. Of that money, $9,748,829,000 would be used for Salaries and Expenses (S&E) and $51,895,000 for Construction. The S&E program saw an increase of $199,673,000.

== History ==
=== Background ===
In 1896, the National Bureau of Criminal Identification was founded, providing agencies across the country with information to identify known criminals. The 1901 assassination of President William McKinley created a perception that the United States was under threat from anarchists. The Departments of Justice and Labor had been keeping records on anarchists for years, but President Theodore Roosevelt wanted more power to monitor them.

The Justice Department had been tasked with the regulation of interstate commerce since 1887, though it lacked the staff to do so. It had made little effort to relieve its staff shortage until the Oregon land fraud scandal at the turn of the 20th century. President Roosevelt instructed Attorney General Charles Bonaparte to organize an autonomous investigative service that would report only to the attorney general.

Bonaparte contacted other agencies, including the U.S. Secret Service, for personnel, investigators in particular. On May 27, 1908, Congress forbade this use of Treasury employees by the Justice Department, citing fears that the new agency would serve as a secret police department. Again at Roosevelt's urging, Bonaparte moved to organize a formal Bureau of Investigation, which would then have its own staff of special agents.

=== Creation of BOI ===
The Bureau of Investigation (BOI) was created on July 26, 1908. Attorney General Bonaparte, using Department of Justice expense funds, hired thirty-four people, including some veterans of the Secret Service, to work for a new investigative agency. Its first "chief" (the title is now "director") was Stanley Finch. Bonaparte notified the Congress of these actions in December 1908.

The bureau's first official task was visiting and making surveys of the houses of prostitution in preparation for enforcing the "White Slave Traffic Act" or Mann Act, passed on June 25, 1910. In 1932, the bureau was renamed the United States Bureau of Investigation.

=== Creation of FBI ===
The following year, 1933, the BOI was linked to the Bureau of Prohibition and rechristened the Division of Investigation (DOI); it became an independent service within the Department of Justice in 1935. In the same year, its name was officially changed from the Division of Investigation to the Federal Bureau of Investigation (FBI).

=== J. Edgar Hoover as FBI director ===
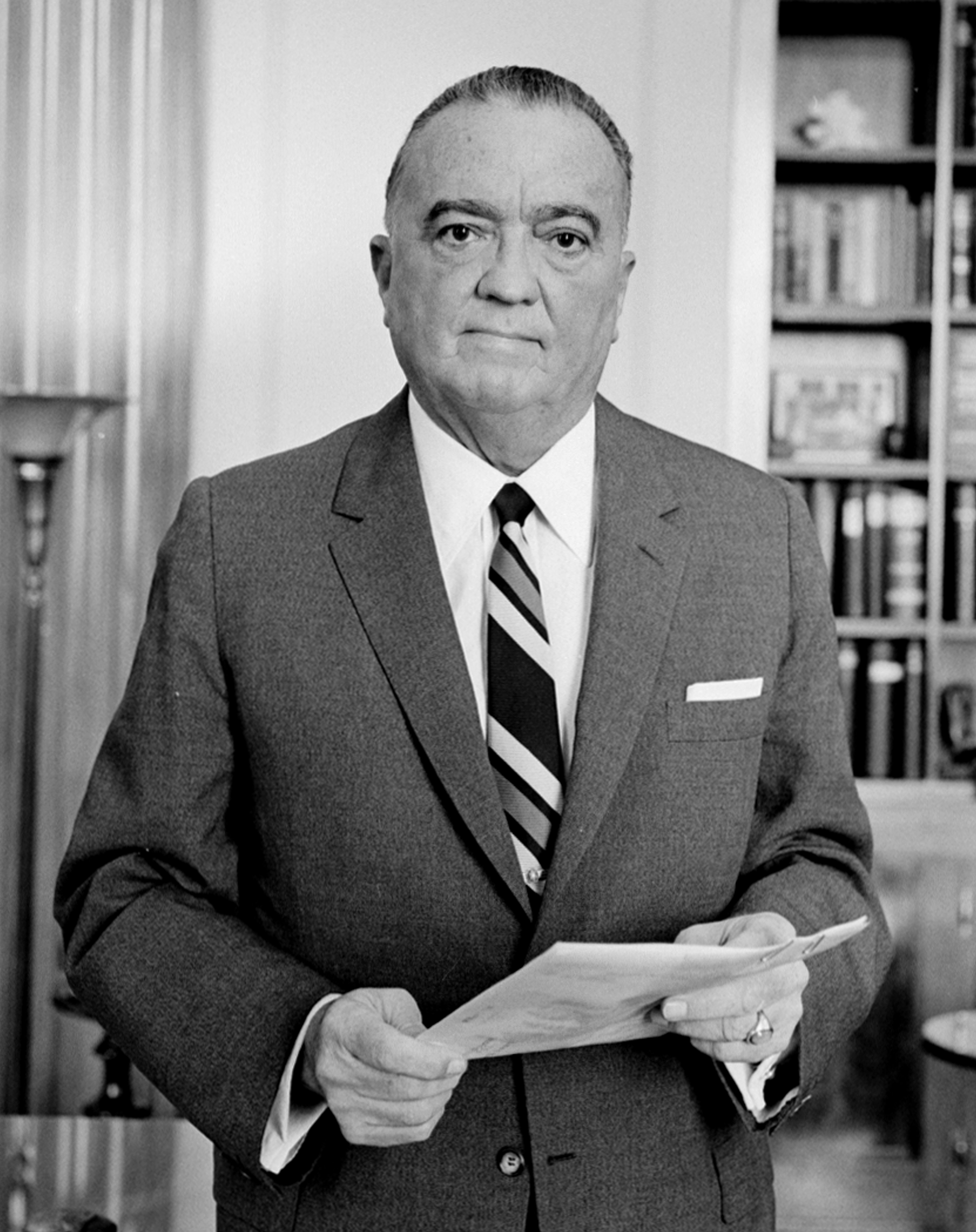
J. Edgar Hoover, FBI director from 1924 to 1972

J. Edgar Hoover served as FBI director from 1924 to 1972, a combined 48 years with the BOI, DOI, and FBI. He was chiefly responsible for creating the Scientific Crime Detection Laboratory, or the FBI Laboratory, which officially opened in 1932, as part of his work to professionalize investigations by the government. Hoover was substantially involved in most major cases and projects that the FBI handled during his tenure. But as detailed below, his tenure as Bureau director proved to be highly controversial, especially in its later years. After Hoover's death, Congress passed legislation that limited the tenure of future FBI directors to ten years.

Early homicide investigations of the new agency included the Osage Indian murders. During the "War on Crime" of the 1930s, FBI agents apprehended or killed a number of notorious criminals who committed kidnappings, bank robberies, and murders throughout the nation, including John Dillinger, "Baby Face" Nelson, Kate "Ma" Barker, Alvin "Creepy" Karpis, and George "Machine Gun" Kelly.

Other activities of its early decades focused on the scope and influence of the white supremacist group Ku Klux Klan, a group with which the FBI was evidenced to be working in the Viola Liuzzo lynching case. Earlier, through the work of Edwin Atherton, the BOI claimed to have successfully apprehended an entire army of Mexican neo-revolutionaries under the leadership of General Enrique Estrada in the mid-1920s, east of San Diego, California.

Hoover began using wiretapping in the 1920s during Prohibition to arrest bootleggers. In the 1927 case Olmstead v. United States, in which a bootlegger was caught through telephone tapping, the United States Supreme Court ruled that FBI wiretaps did not violate the Fourth Amendment as unlawful search and seizure, as long as the FBI did not break into a person's home to complete the tapping. After Prohibition's repeal, Congress passed the Communications Act of 1934, which outlawed non-consensual phone tapping, but did allow bugging. In the 1939 case Nardone v. United States, the court ruled that due to the 1934 law, evidence the FBI obtained by phone tapping was inadmissible in court. After Katz v. United States (1967) overturned Olmstead, Congress passed the Omnibus Crime Control Act, allowing public authorities to tap telephones during investigations, as long as they obtained warrants beforehand.

==== National security ====
Beginning in the 1940s and continuing into the 1970s, the bureau investigated cases of espionage against the United States and its allies. Eight Nazi agents who had planned sabotage operations against American targets were arrested, and six were executed (Ex parte Quirin) under their sentences. Also during this time, a joint US/UK code-breaking effort called "the Venona Project"—with which the FBI was heavily involved—broke Soviet diplomatic and intelligence communications codes, allowing the US and British governments to read Soviet communications. This effort confirmed the existence of Americans working in the United States for Soviet intelligence. Hoover was administering this project, but he failed to notify the Central Intelligence Agency (CIA) of it until 1952. Another notable case was the arrest of Soviet spy Rudolf Abel in 1957. The discovery of Soviet spies operating in the US motivated Hoover to pursue his longstanding concern with the threat he perceived from the American Left.

==== Japanese American internment ====
In 1939, the Bureau began compiling a custodial detention list with the names of those who would be taken into custody in the event of war with Axis nations. The majority of the names on the list belonged to Issei community leaders, as the FBI investigation built on an existing Naval Intelligence index that had focused on Japanese Americans in Hawaii and the West Coast, but many German and Italian nationals also found their way onto the FBI Index list. Robert Shivers, head of the Honolulu office, obtained permission from Hoover to start detaining those on the list on December 7, 1941, while bombs were still falling over Pearl Harbor. Mass arrests and searches of homes, in most cases conducted without warrants, began a few hours after the attack, and over the next several weeks more than 5,500 Issei men were taken into FBI custody.

On February 19, 1942, President Franklin Roosevelt issued Executive Order 9066, authorizing the removal of Japanese Americans from the West Coast. FBI Director Hoover opposed the subsequent mass removal and confinement of Japanese Americans authorized under Executive Order 9066, but Roosevelt prevailed. The vast majority went along with the subsequent exclusion orders, but in a handful of cases where Japanese Americans refused to obey the new military regulations, FBI agents handled their arrests. The Bureau continued surveillance on Japanese Americans throughout the war, conducting background checks on applicants for resettlement outside camp, and entering the camps, usually without the permission of War Relocation Authority officials, and grooming informants to monitor dissidents and "troublemakers". After the war, the FBI was assigned to protect returning Japanese Americans from attacks by hostile white communities.

==== COMINFIL programs ====
The FBI's COMINFIL programs (COMINFIL was shorthand for "communist infiltration of") were initiated in the 1940s. COMINFIL investigations gathered intelligence under the following categories: "political activities, legislative activities, domestic administration issues, Negro question, youth matters, women's matters, farmers' matters, cultural activities, veterans matters, religion, education, industry"

Writer Richard Steven Street maintains that COMINFIL programs were designed "to 'expose, disrupt, or otherwise neutralize' and purge Communist Party members and others considered subversive from positions of power." COMINFIL programs allowed the FBI to surveil organizations and individuals, ranging from the Farmworkers' union to the Los Angeles PTA to entire industries, like radio and broadcasting

==== Sex deviates program ====
According to Douglas M. Charles, the FBI's "sex deviates" program began on April 10, 1950, when J. Edgar Hoover forwarded to the White House, to the U.S. Civil Service Commission, and to branches of the armed services a list of 393 alleged federal employees who had allegedly been arrested in Washington, D.C., since 1947, on charges of "sexual irregularities". On June 20, 1951, Hoover expanded the program by issuing a memo establishing a "uniform policy for the handling of the increasing number of reports and allegations concerning present and past employees of the United States Government who assertedly [sic] are sex deviates". The program was expanded to include non-government jobs. According to Athan Theoharis, "In 1951 he [Hoover] had unilaterally instituted a Sex Deviates program to purge alleged homosexuals from any position in the federal government, from the lowliest clerk to the more powerful position of White House aide." On May 27, 1953, Executive Order 10450 went into effect. The program was expanded further by this executive order by making all federal employment of homosexuals illegal. On July 8, 1953, the FBI forwarded to the U.S. Civil Service Commission information from the sex deviates program. Between 1977 and 1978, 300,000 pages in the sex deviates program, collected between 1930 and the mid-1970s, were destroyed by FBI officials.

==== Civil rights movement ====
During the 1950s and 1960s, FBI officials became increasingly concerned about the influence of civil rights leaders, whom they believed either had communist ties or were unduly influenced by communists or "fellow travelers". In 1956, for example, Hoover sent an open letter denouncing Dr. T. R. M. Howard, a civil rights leader, surgeon, and wealthy entrepreneur in Mississippi who had criticized FBI inaction in solving recent murders of George W. Lee, Emmett Till, and other blacks in the South.

The FBI carried out controversial domestic surveillance in an operation it called the COINTELPRO, from "COunter-INTELligence PROgram". It was to investigate and disrupt the activities of dissident political organizations within the United States, including both militant and non-violent organizations. Among its targets was the Southern Christian Leadership Conference, a leading civil rights organization whose clergy leadership included the Rev. Dr. Martin Luther King Jr..

The "suicide letter", mailed anonymously to King by the FBI

The FBI frequently investigated King. In the mid-1960s, King began to criticize the Bureau for giving insufficient attention to the use of terrorism by white supremacists. Hoover responded by publicly calling King the most "notorious liar" in the United States. In his 1991 memoir, Washington Post journalist Carl Rowan asserted that the FBI had sent at least one anonymous letter to King encouraging him to commit suicide. Historian Taylor Branch documents an anonymous November 1964 "suicide package" sent by the Bureau that combined a letter to the civil rights leader telling him "You are done. There is only one way out for you." with audio recordings of King's sexual indiscretions.

In March 1971, the residential office of an FBI agent in Media, Pennsylvania, was burgled by a group calling itself the Citizens' Commission to Investigate the FBI. Numerous files were taken and distributed to a range of newspapers, including The Harvard Crimson. The files detailed the FBI's extensive COINTELPRO program, which included investigations into lives of ordinary citizens—including a black student group at a Pennsylvania military college and the daughter of Congressman Henry S. Reuss of Wisconsin. The country was "jolted" by the revelations, which included assassinations of political activists, and the actions were denounced by members of the Congress, including House Majority Leader Hale Boggs. The phones of some members of the Congress, including Boggs, had allegedly been tapped.

==== Kennedy's assassination ====
When President John F. Kennedy was shot and killed, the jurisdiction fell to the local police departments until President Lyndon B. Johnson directed the FBI to take over the investigation. To ensure clarity about the responsibility for investigation of homicides of federal officials, Congress passed a law in 1965 that included investigations of such deaths of federal officials, especially by homicide, within FBI jurisdiction.

=== Organized crime ===
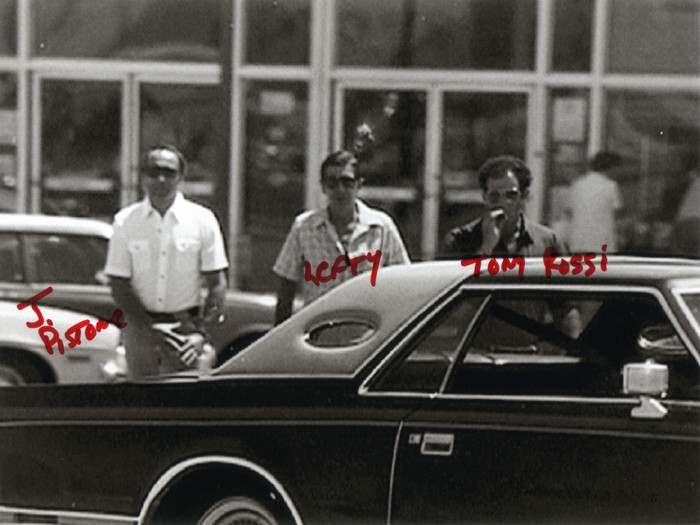
An FBI surveillance photograph of Joseph D. Pistone (aka Donnie Brasco), Benjamin "Lefty" Ruggiero and Edgar Robb (aka Tony Rossi), 1980s

In response to organized crime, on August 25, 1953, the FBI created the Top Hoodlum Program. The national office directed field offices to gather information on mobsters in their territories and to report it regularly to Washington for a centralized collection of intelligence on racketeers. After the Racketeer Influenced and Corrupt Organizations Act, or RICO Act, took effect, the FBI began investigating the former Prohibition-organized groups, which had become fronts for crime in major cities and small towns. All the FBI work was done undercover and from within these organizations, using the provisions provided in the RICO Act. Gradually, the agency dismantled many of the groups. Although Hoover initially denied the existence of a National Crime Syndicate in the United States, the Bureau later conducted operations against known organized crime syndicates and families. The RICO Act is still used today for all organized crime and any individuals who may fall under the act's provisions.

In 2003, a congressional committee called the FBI's organized crime informant program "one of the greatest failures in the history of federal law enforcement". The FBI allowed four innocent men to be convicted of the March 1965 gangland murder of Edward "Teddy" Deegan in order to protect Vincent Flemmi, an FBI informant. Three of the men were sentenced to death (which was later reduced to life in prison), and the fourth defendant was sentenced to life in prison. Two of the four men died in prison after serving almost 30 years, and two others were released after serving 32 and 36 years. In July 2007, U.S. District Judge Nancy Gertner in Boston found that the bureau had helped convict the four men using false witness accounts given by mobster Joseph Barboza. The U.S. Government was ordered to pay $100 million in damages to the four defendants.

=== Special FBI teams ===
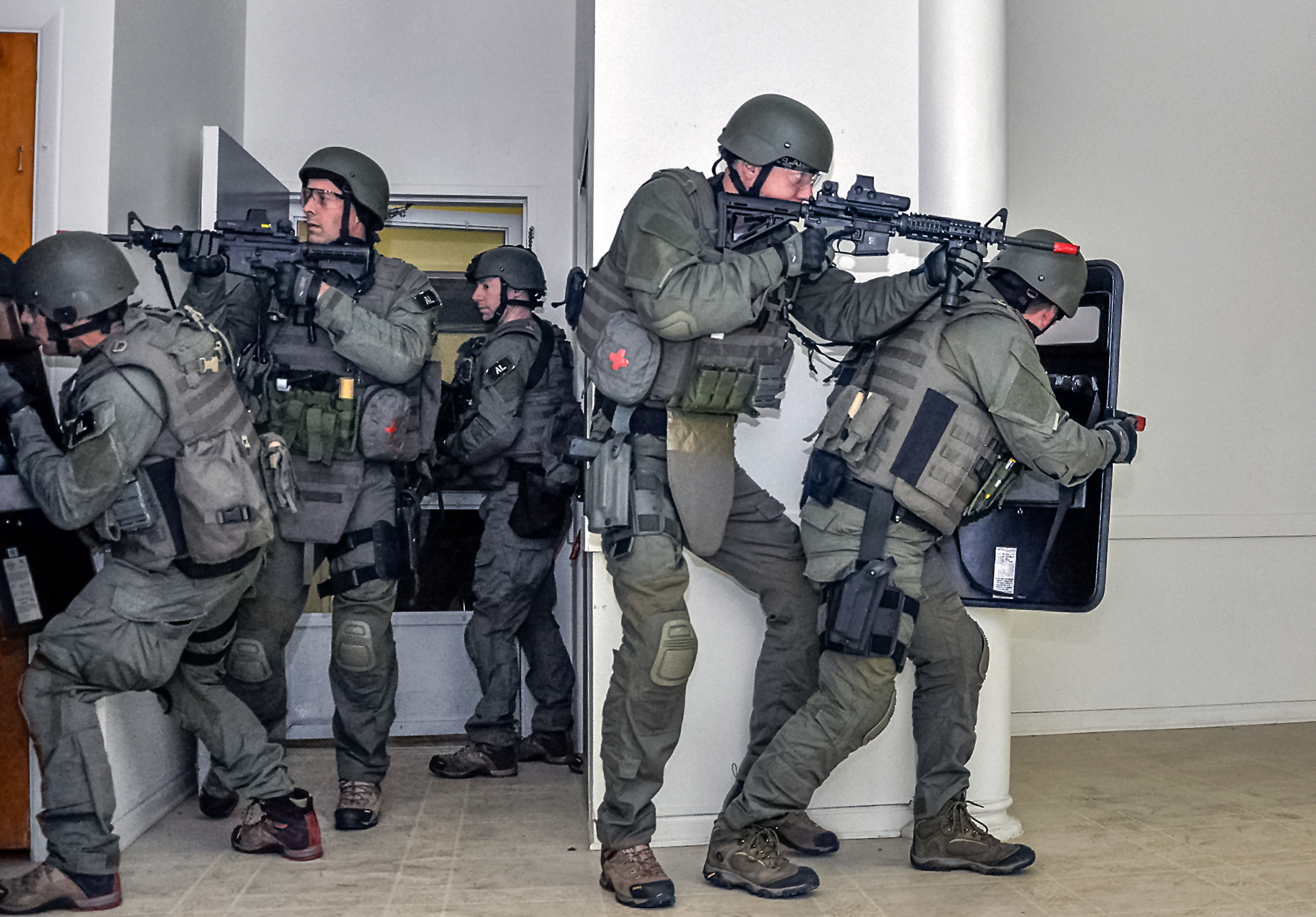
FBI SWAT agents in a training exercise

In 1982, the FBI formed an elite unit to help with problems that might arise at the 1984 Summer Olympics to be held in Los Angeles, particularly terrorism and major-crime. This was a result of the 1972 Summer Olympics in Munich, Germany, when terrorists murdered the Israeli athletes. Named the Hostage Rescue Team, or HRT, it acts as a dedicated FBI SWAT team dealing primarily with counter-terrorism scenarios. Unlike the special agents serving on local FBI SWAT teams, HRT does not conduct investigations. Instead, HRT focuses solely on additional tactical proficiency and capabilities. Also formed in 1984 was the Computer Analysis and Response Team, or CART.

From the late 1980s to the early 1990s, the FBI reassigned more than 300 agents from foreign counter-intelligence duties to violent crime, and made violent crime the sixth national priority. With cuts to other well-established departments, and because terrorism was no longer considered a threat after the end of the Cold War, the FBI assisted local and state police forces in tracking fugitives who had crossed state lines, which is a federal offense. The FBI Laboratory helped develop DNA testing, continuing its pioneering role in identification that began with its fingerprinting system in 1924.

=== Notable efforts in the 1990s ===
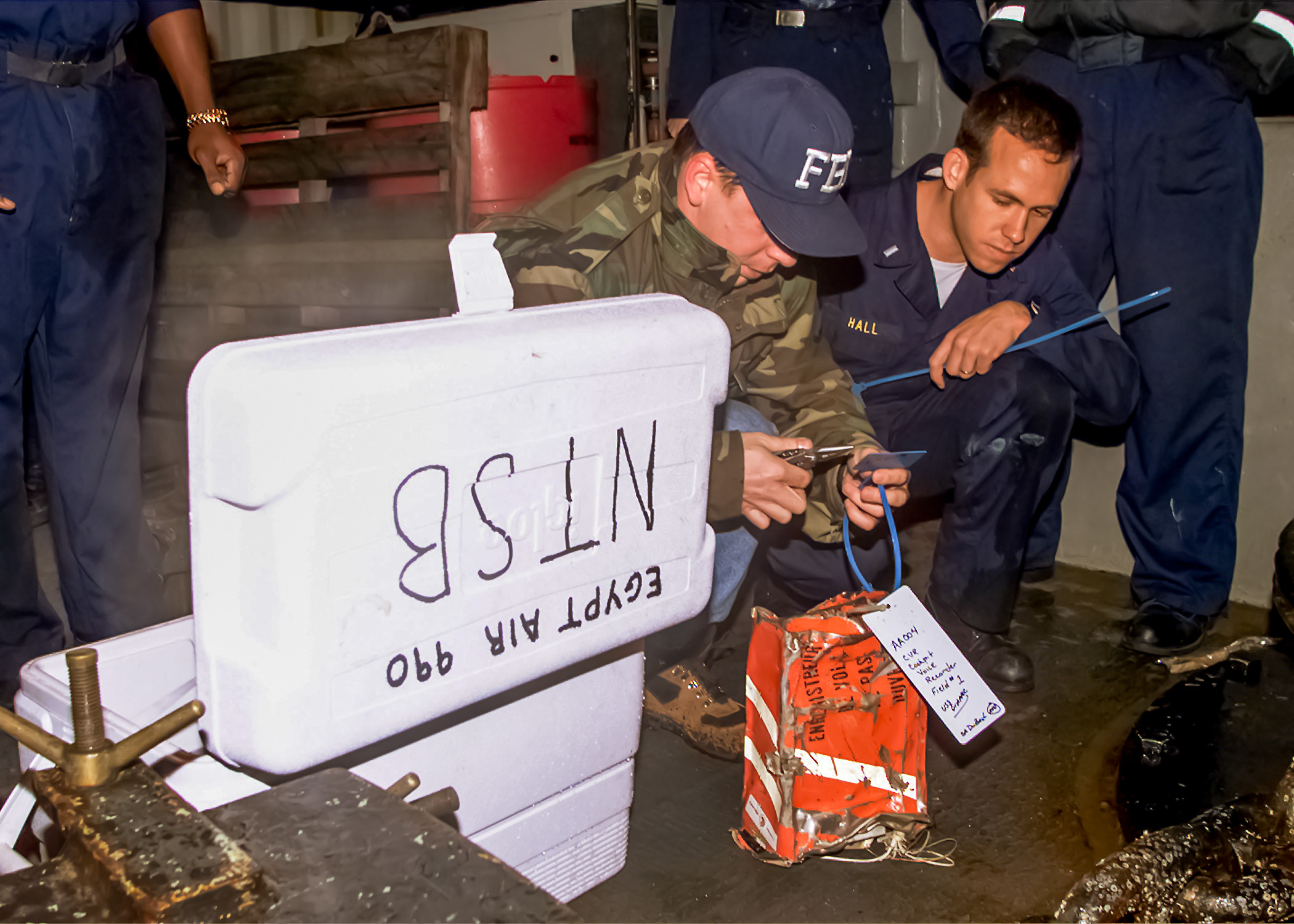
FBI agent tagging the cockpit voice recorder from EgyptAir Flight 990 on the deck of USNS Grapple at the crash site on November 13, 1999

On May 1, 1992, FBI SWAT and HRT personnel in Los Angeles County, California aided local officials in securing peace within the area during the 1992 Los Angeles riots. HRT operators, for instance, spent 10 days conducting vehicle-mounted patrols throughout Los Angeles, before returning to Virginia.

Between 1993 and 1996, the FBI increased its counter-terrorism role following the first 1993 World Trade Center bombing in New York City, the 1995 Oklahoma City bombing, and the arrest of the Unabomber in 1996. Technological innovation and the skills of FBI Laboratory analysts helped ensure that the three cases were successfully prosecuted. However, Justice Department investigations into the FBI's roles in the Ruby Ridge and Waco incidents were found to have been obstructed by agents within the Bureau. During the 1996 Summer Olympics in Atlanta, Georgia, the FBI was criticized for its investigation of the Centennial Olympic Park bombing. It has settled a dispute with Richard Jewell, who was a private security guard at the venue, along with some media organizations.

In response to the 1998 U.S. embassy bombings in Kenya and Tanzania, the FBI developed its Strategic Plan 1998–2003 to prioritize counterterrorism and national security. This plan introduced a three-tiered system to classify and prioritize investigative programs agency-wide. Tier One, the highest priority, included national security programs such as counterterrorism and counterintelligence; Tier Two encompassed major criminal investigations, such as organized crime and white-collar crime, while Tier Three covered lower-priority matters, including "the most significant" crimes against property and individuals.

The September 11, 2001 attacks accelerated the FBI's implementation of the tier system, leading to a significant reallocation of resources toward Tier One programs. A 2003 audit by the Department of Justice Office of the Inspector General (OIG) reported that the average number of agents assigned to terrorism-related investigations more than doubled—from 2,126 in FY 2000 to 4,680 by FY 2002—largely due to the expansion of the Counterterrorism Division's Joint Terrorism Task Forces and related initiatives.

=== September 11 attacks ===
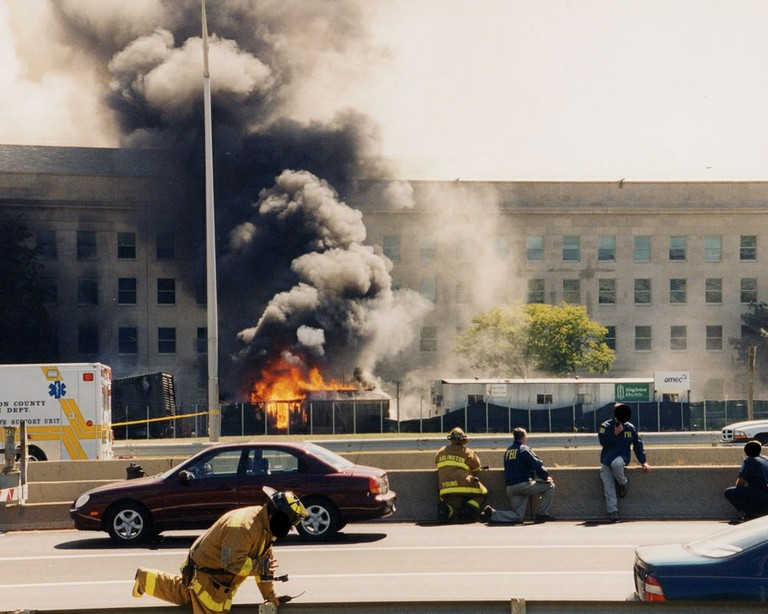
September 11 attacks at the Pentagon

During the September 11, 2001, attacks on the World Trade Center, FBI agent Leonard W. Hatton Jr. was killed during the rescue effort while helping the rescue personnel evacuate the occupants of the South Tower, and he stayed when it collapsed. Within months after the attacks, FBI director Robert Mueller, who had been sworn in a week before the attacks, called for a re-engineering of FBI structure and operations. He made countering every federal crime a top priority, including the prevention of terrorism, countering foreign intelligence operations, addressing cybersecurity threats, other high-tech crimes, protecting civil rights, combating public corruption, organized crime, white-collar crime, and major acts of violent crime.

In February 2001, Robert Hanssen was caught selling information to the Russian government. It was later learned that Hanssen, who had reached a high position within the FBI, had been selling intelligence since as early as 1979. He pleaded guilty to espionage and received a life sentence in 2002, but the incident led many to question the security practices employed by the FBI. There was also a claim that Hanssen might have contributed information that led to the September 11, 2001, attacks.

The 9/11 Commission's final report on July 22, 2004, stated that the FBI and Central Intelligence Agency (CIA) were both partially to blame for not pursuing intelligence reports that could have prevented the September 11 attacks. In its most damning assessment, the report concluded that the country had "not been well served" by either agency and listed numerous recommendations for changes within the FBI. While the FBI did accede to most of the recommendations, including oversight by the new director of National Intelligence, some former members of the 9/11 Commission publicly criticized the FBI in October 2005, claiming it was resisting any meaningful changes.

On July 8, 2007, The Washington Post published excerpts from UCLA Professor Amy Zegart's book Spying Blind: The CIA, the FBI, and the Origins of 9/11. The Post reported, from Zegart's book, that government documents showed that both the CIA and the FBI had missed 23 potential chances to disrupt the terrorist attacks of September 11, 2001. The primary reasons for the failures included: agency cultures resistant to change and new ideas; inappropriate incentives for promotion; and a lack of cooperation between the FBI, CIA, and the rest of the United States Intelligence Community. The book blamed the FBI's decentralized structure, which prevented effective communication and cooperation among different FBI offices. The book suggested that the FBI had not evolved into an effective counter-terrorism or counter-intelligence agency, due in large part to deeply ingrained agency cultural resistance to change. For example, FBI personnel practices continued to treat all staff other than special agents as support staff, classifying intelligence analysts alongside the FBI's auto mechanics and janitors.

=== Faulty bullet analysis ===
For over 40 years, the FBI crime lab in Quantico had believed that lead alloys used in bullets had unique chemical signatures. It was analyzing the bullets with the goal of matching them chemically, not only to a single batch of ammunition coming out of a factory, but also to a single box of bullets. The National Academy of Sciences conducted an 18-month independent review of comparative bullet-lead analysis. In 2003, its National Research Council published a report whose conclusions called into question 30 years of FBI testimony. It found the analytic model used by the FBI for interpreting results was deeply flawed, and the conclusion, that bullet fragments could be matched to a box of ammunition, was so overstated that it was misleading under the rules of evidence. One year later, the FBI decided to stop conducting bullet lead analyses.

After a 60 Minutes/The Washington Post investigation in November 2007, two years later, the Bureau agreed to identify, review, and release all pertinent cases, and notify prosecutors about cases in which faulty testimony was given.

=== Technology ===
In 2012, the FBI formed the National Domestic Communications Assistance Center to develop technology for assisting law enforcement with technical knowledge regarding communication services, technologies, and electronic surveillance.

=== January 6 United States Capitol attack ===
An FBI informant who participated in the January 6 United States Capitol attack on democratic institutions in Washington D.C. later testified in support of the Proud Boys, who were part of the plot. Revelations about the informant raised fresh questions about intelligence failures by the FBI before the riot. According to the Brennan Center and United States Senate committees, the FBI's response to white supremacist violence was "woefully inadequate". The FBI has long been suspected to have turned a blind eye towards right-wing extremists while disseminating conspiracy theories on the origin of SARS-CoV-2.

== Organization ==
=== Organizational structure ===
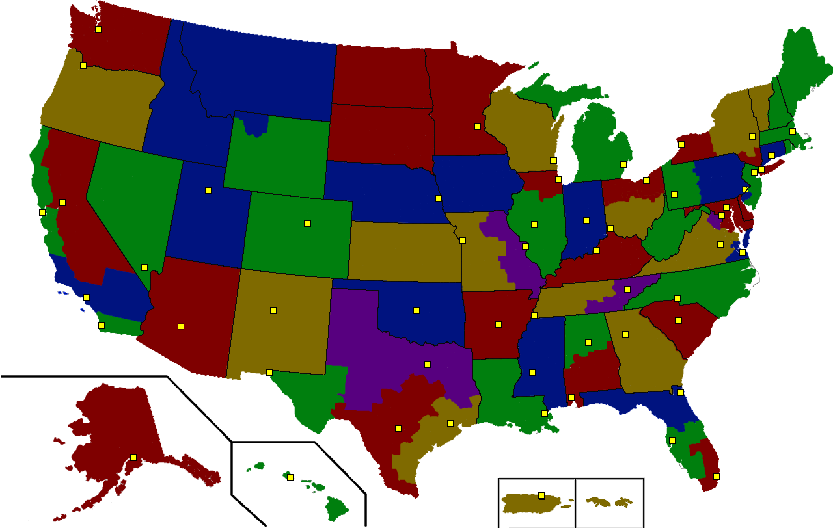
FBI field divisions map

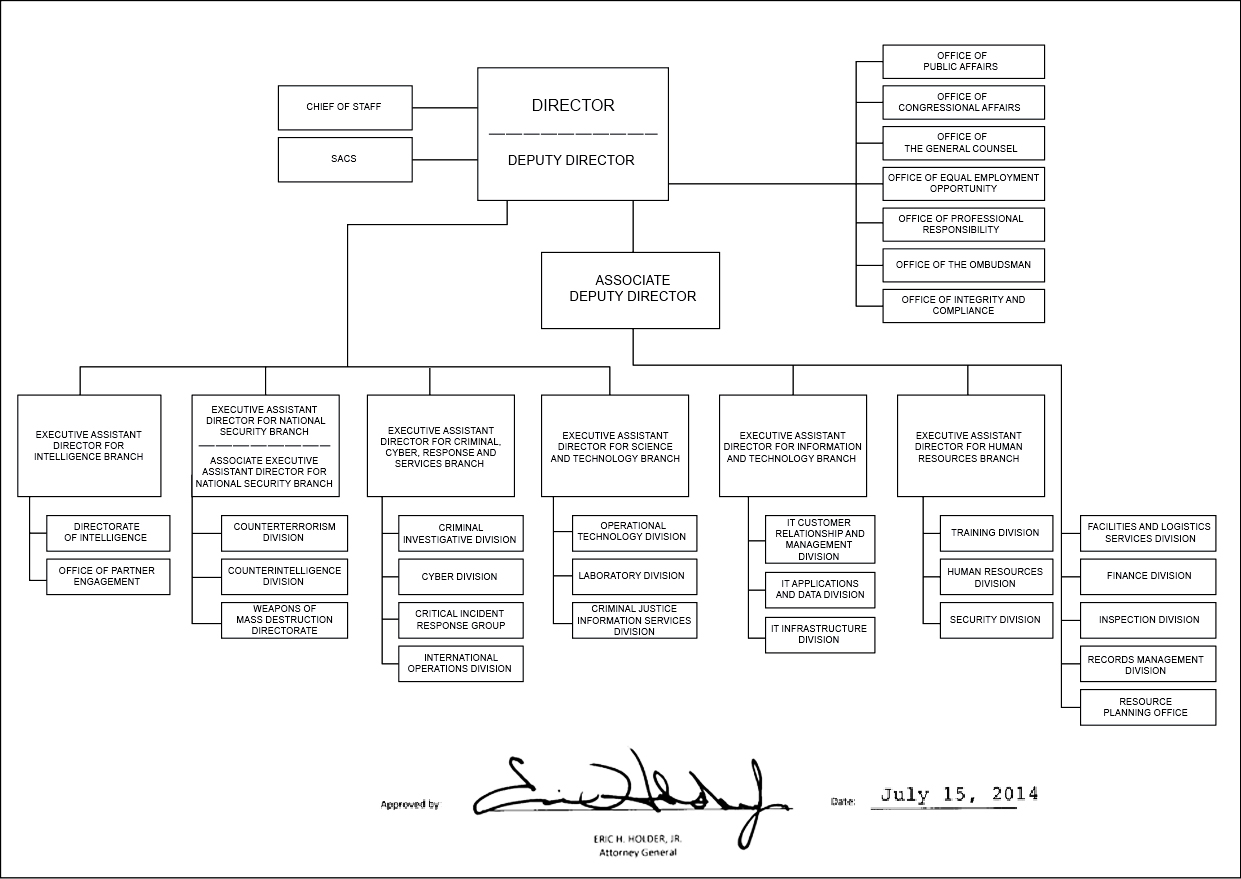
Organization chart for the FBI as of July 15, 2014

Redacted policy guide for the Counterterrorism Division (part of the FBI National Security Branch)

The FBI is organized into functional branches and the Office of the Director, which contains most administrative offices. An executive assistant director manages each branch. Each branch is then divided into offices and divisions, each headed by an assistant director. The various divisions are further divided into sub-branches, led by deputy assistant directors. Within these sub-branches, there are various sections headed by section chiefs. Section chiefs are ranked analogous to special agents in charge. Four of the branches report to the deputy director while two report to the associate director.

The main branches of the FBI are:

- FBI Intelligence Branch
  - Executive Assistant Director: Stephen Laycock
- FBI National Security Branch
  - Executive Assistant Director: John Brown
- FBI Criminal, Cyber, Response, and Services Branch
  - Executive Assistant Director: Terry Wade
- FBI Science and Technology Branch
  - Executive Assistant Director: Darrin E. Jones
- FBI Information and Technology Branch
  - Executive Assistant Director: Michael Gavin (Acting)
- FBI Human Resources Branch
  - Executive Assistant Director: Jeffrey S. Sallet

Each branch focuses on different tasks, and some focus on more than one. Here are some of the tasks that different branches are in charge of:

==== FBI Headquarters Washington, D.C. ====
National Security Branch (NSB)

- Counterintelligence Division (CD)
- Counterterrorism Division (CTD)
- Weapons of Mass Destruction Directorate (WMDD)
- High-Value Detainee Interrogation Group (HIG)
- Terrorist Screening Center (TSC)

Intelligence Branch (IB)

- Directorate of Intelligence (DI)
- Office of Partner Engagement (OPE)
- Office of Private Sector

FBI Criminal, Cyber, Response, and Services Branch (CCRSB)

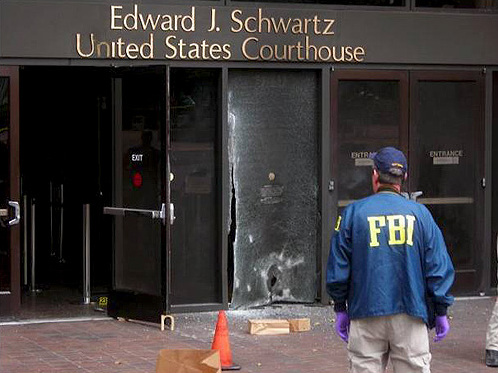
An FBI agent at a crime scene

- Criminal Investigation Division (CID)
  - Violent Crime Section (VCS)
  - Child Exploitation Operational Unit (CEOU) a joint unit between the FBI and U.S. Homeland Security Investigations (HSI) - Located in Boston Mass.
  - Violent Crimes Against Children Section (VCACS)
  - Major Case Coordination Unit (MCCU)
- Cyber Division (CyD)
- Critical Incident Response Group (CIRG)
- International Operation Division (IOD)
- Victim Services Division

Science and Technology Branch (STB)

- Operational Technology Division (OTD)
- Laboratory Division (LD)
- Criminal Justice Information Services (CJIS) Division

==== Other Headquarter Offices ====
Information and Technology Branch (ITB)

- IT Enterprise Services Division (ITESD)
- IT Applications and Data Division (ITADD)
- IT Infrastructure Division (ITID)
- IT Management Division
- IT Engineering Division
- IT Services Division

Human Resources Branch (HRB)

- Training Division (TD)
- Human Resources Division (HRD)
- Security Division (SecD)

Administrative and financial management support

- Facilities and Logistics Services Division (FLSD)
- Finance Division (FD)
- Records Management Division (RMD)
- Resource Planning Office (RPO)
- Inspection Division (InSD)

=== Office of the Director ===
The Office of the Director serves as the central administrative organ of the FBI. The office provides staff support functions (such as finance and facilities management) to the five function branches and the various field divisions. The office is managed by the FBI associate director, who also oversees the operations of both the Information and Technology and Human Resources Branches.

Senior staff

- Deputy director
- Associate deputy director
- Chief of staff

Office of the Director

- Finance and Facilities Division
- Information Management Division
- Insider Threat Office
- Inspection Division
- Office of the Chief Information Officer
- Office of Congressional Affairs (OCA)
- Office of Diversity and Inclusion
- Office of Equal Employment Opportunity Affairs (OEEOA)
- Office of the General Counsel (OGC)
- Office of Integrity and Compliance (OIC)
- Office of Internal Auditing
- Office of the Ombudsman
- Office of Professional Responsibility (OPR)
- Office of Public Affairs (OPA)
- Resource Planning Office

=== Rank structure ===
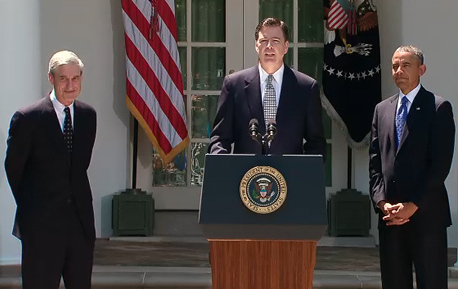
James Comey speaks at the White House following his nomination by President Barack Obama to be the next director of the FBI, June 21, 2013.

The following is a listing of the rank structure found within the FBI (in ascending order):

- Field agents
  - New agent trainee
  - Special agent
  - Senior special agent
  - Supervisory special agent
  - Assistant special agent-in-charge (ASAC)
  - Special agent-in-charge (SAC)
- FBI management
  - Deputy assistant director
  - Assistant director
  - Associate executive assistant director (National Security Branch only)
  - Executive assistant director
  - Deputy chief of staff
  - Chief of staff and special counsel to the director
  - Associate deputy director
  - Deputy director
  - Director

== Legal authority ==
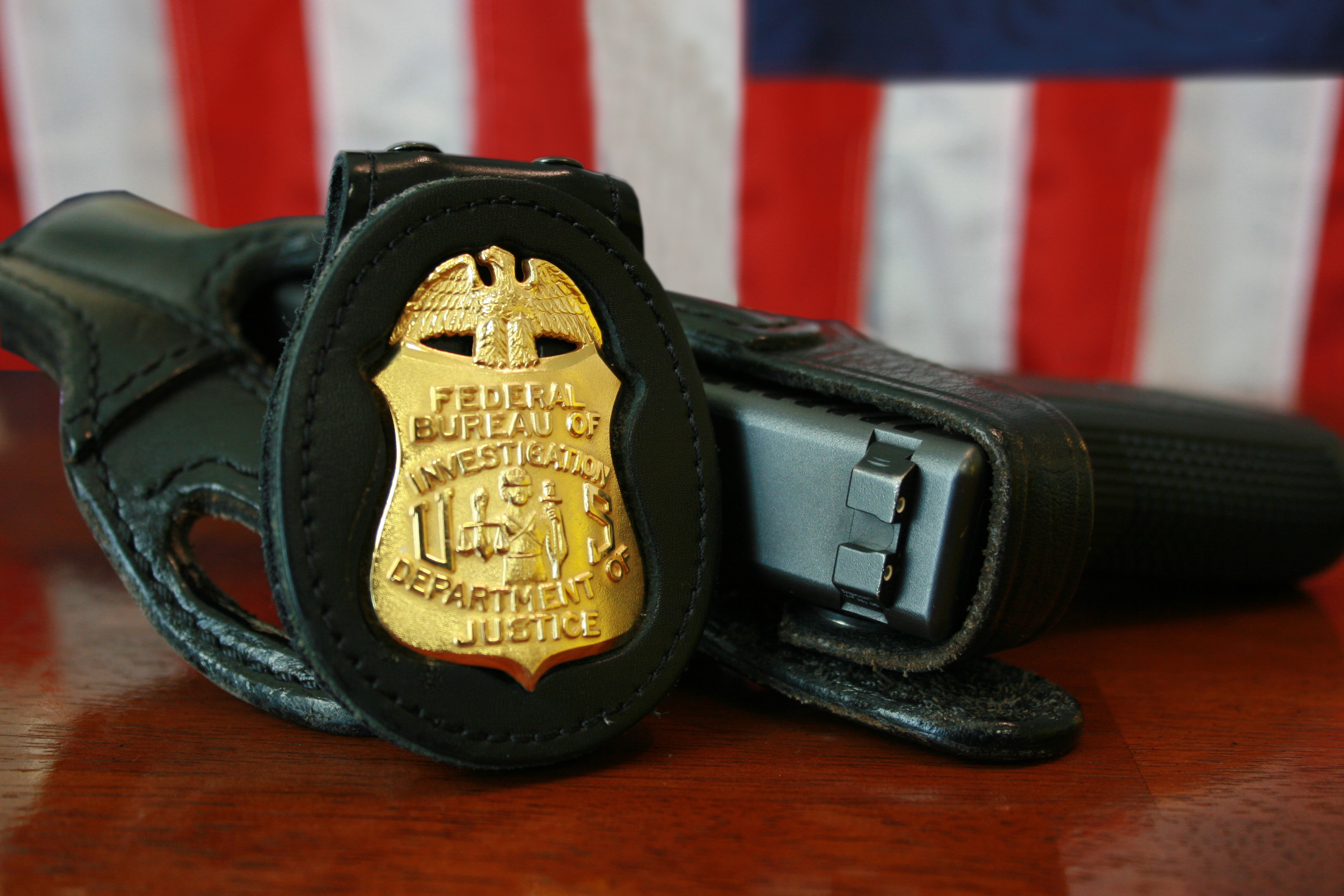
FBI badge and service pistol, a Glock Model 22, .40 S&W caliber

The FBI's mandate is established in Title 28 of the United States Code (U.S. Code), Section 533, which authorizes the Attorney General to "appoint officials to detect and prosecute crimes against the United States". Other federal statutes give the FBI the authority and responsibility to investigate specific crimes.

The FBI's chief tool against organized crime is the Racketeer Influenced and Corrupt Organizations (RICO) Act. The FBI is also charged with the responsibility of enforcing compliance with the United States Civil Rights Act of 1964 and investigating violations of the act, in addition to prosecuting such violations with the United States Department of Justice (DOJ). The FBI also shares concurrent jurisdiction with the Drug Enforcement Administration (DEA) in the enforcement of the Controlled Substances Act of 1970.

The USA PATRIOT Act increased the powers allotted to the FBI, especially in wiretapping and monitoring of Internet activity. One of the most controversial provisions of the act is the so-called sneak and peek provision, granting the FBI powers to search a house while the residents are away, and not requiring them to notify the residents for several weeks afterward. Under the PATRIOT Act's provisions, the FBI also resumed inquiring into the library records of those who are suspected of terrorism (something it had supposedly not done since the 1970s).

In the early 1980s, Senate hearings were held to examine FBI undercover operations in the wake of the Abscam controversy, which had allegations of entrapment of elected officials. As a result, in the following years a number of guidelines were issued to constrain FBI activities.

Information obtained through an FBI investigation is presented to the appropriate U.S. Attorney or Department of Justice official, who decides if prosecution or other action is warranted.

The FBI often works in conjunction with other federal agencies, including the U.S. Coast Guard (USCG) and U.S. Customs and Border Protection (CBP) in seaport and airport security, and the National Transportation Safety Board in investigating airplane crashes and other critical incidents. Immigration and Customs Enforcement's Homeland Security Investigations (HSI) has nearly the same amount of investigative manpower as the FBI and investigates the largest range of crimes. In the wake of the September 11 attacks, then–Attorney General Ashcroft assigned the FBI as the designated lead organization in terrorism investigations after the creation of the U.S. Department of Homeland Security. HSI and the FBI are both integral members of the Joint Terrorism Task Force.

=== Indian reservations ===
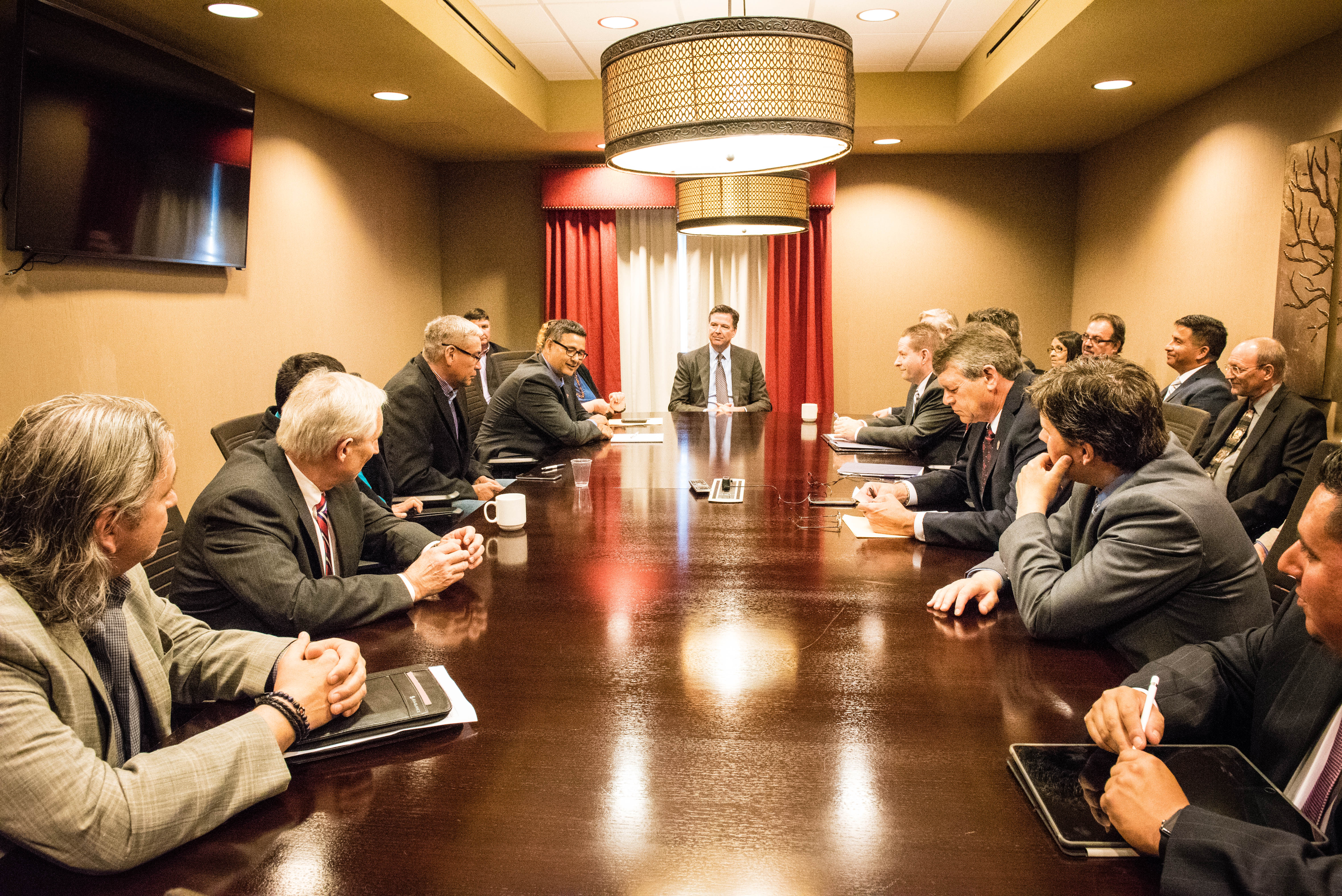
FBI Director James Comey visiting the Fort Berthold Indian Reservation in North Dakota in June 2016

The federal government has the primary responsibility for investigating and prosecuting serious crime on Indian reservations.

There are 565 federally recognized American Indian Tribes in the United States, and the FBI has federal law enforcement responsibility on nearly 200 Indian reservations. This federal jurisdiction is shared concurrently with the Bureau of Indian Affairs, Office of Justice Services (BIA-OJS).

Located within the FBI's Criminal Investigative Division, the Indian Country Crimes Unit (ICCU) is responsible for developing and implementing strategies, programs, and policies to address identified crime problems in Indian Country (IC) for which the FBI has responsibility.

— Overview, Indian Country Crime

The FBI does not specifically list crimes in Native American land as one of its priorities. Often serious crimes have been either poorly investigated or prosecution has been declined. Tribal courts can impose sentences of up to three years, under certain restrictions.

== Infrastructure ==
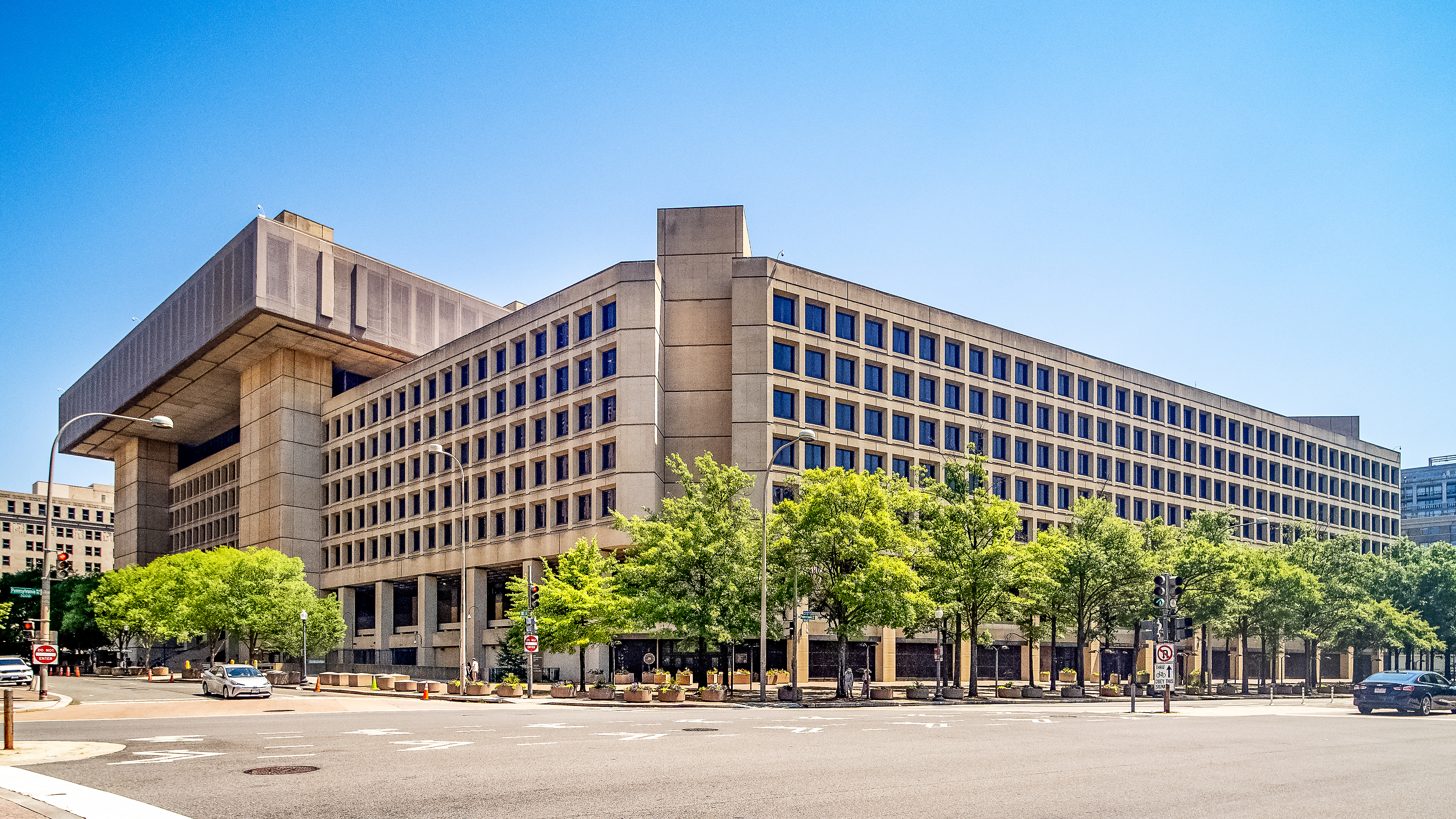
The J. Edgar Hoover Building, FBI headquarters

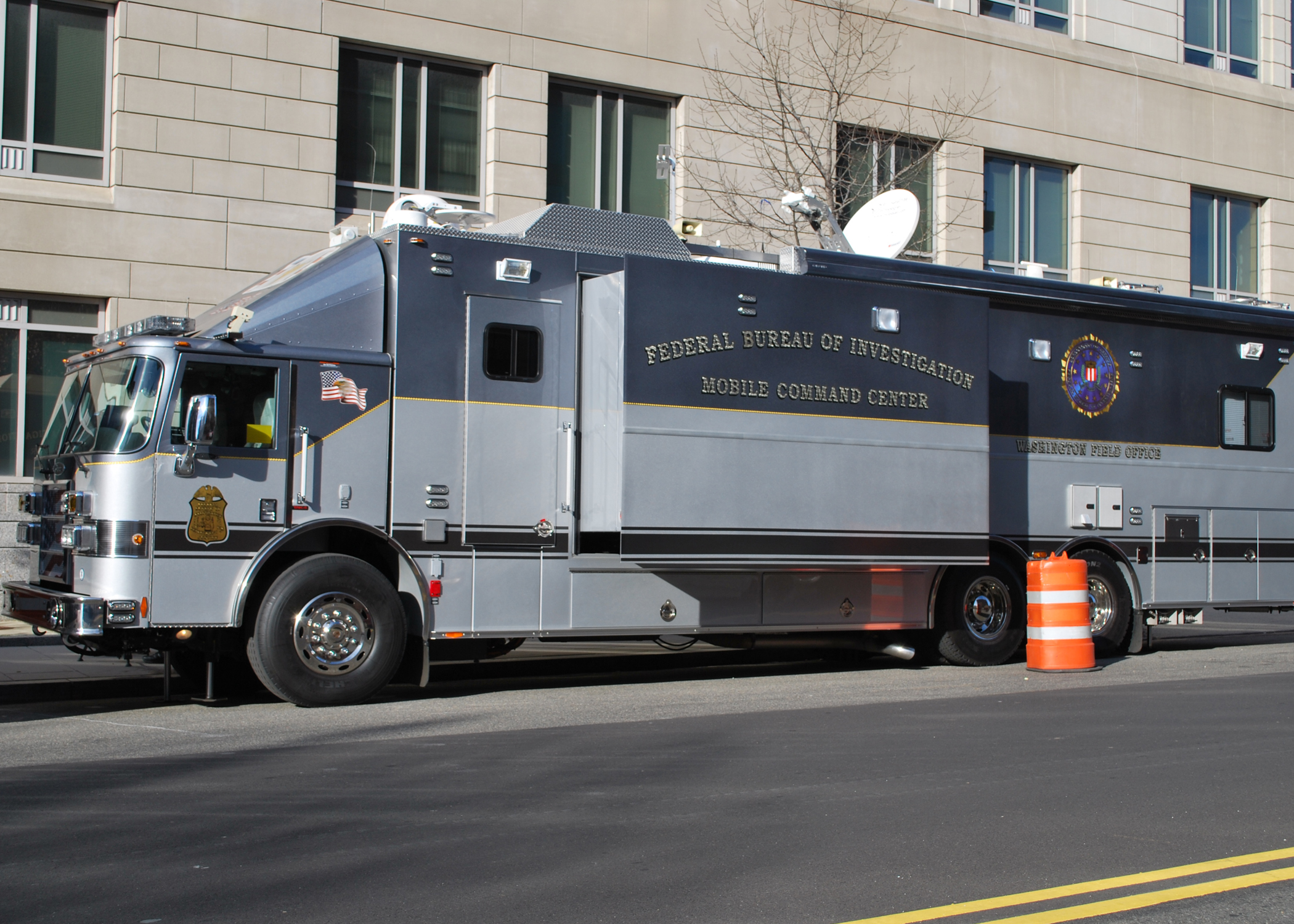
FBI Mobile Command Center, Washington Field Office

The FBI is headquartered at the J. Edgar Hoover Building in Washington, D.C., with 56 field offices in major cities across the United States. The FBI also maintains over 400 resident agencies across the United States, as well as over 50 legal attachés at United States embassies and consulates. Many specialized FBI functions are located at facilities in Quantico, Virginia, as well as a "data campus" in Clarksburg, West Virginia, where 96 million sets of fingerprints "from across the United States are stored, along with others collected by American authorities from prisoners in Saudi Arabia and Yemen, Iraq and Afghanistan". The FBI is in the process of moving its Records Management Division, which processes Freedom of Information Act (FOIA) requests, to Winchester, Virginia.

According to The Washington Post, the FBI "is building a vast repository controlled by people who work in a top-secret vault on the fourth floor of the J. Edgar Hoover Building in Washington. This one stores the profiles of tens of thousands of Americans and legal residents who are not accused of any crime. What they have done is appear to be acting suspiciously to a town sheriff, a traffic cop or even a neighbor."

The FBI Laboratory, established with the formation of the BOI, did not appear in the J. Edgar Hoover Building until its completion in 1974. The lab serves as the primary lab for most DNA, biological, and physical work. Public tours of FBI headquarters ran through the FBI laboratory workspace before the move to the J. Edgar Hoover Building. The services the lab conducts include Chemistry, Combined DNA Index System (CODIS), Computer Analysis and Response, DNA Analysis, Evidence Response, Explosives, Firearms and Tool marks, Forensic Audio, Forensic Video, Image Analysis, Forensic Science Research, Forensic Science Training, Hazardous Materials Response, Investigative and Prospective Graphics, Latent Prints, Materials Analysis, Questioned Documents, Racketeering Records, Special Photographic Analysis, Structural Design, and Trace Evidence. The services of the FBI Laboratory are used by many state, local, and international agencies free of charge. The lab also maintains a second lab at the FBI Academy.

The FBI Academy, located in Quantico, Virginia, is home to the communications and computer laboratory the FBI utilizes. It is also where new agents are sent for training to become FBI special agents. Going through the 21-week course is required for every special agent. First opened for use in 1972, the facility is located on 385 acres (156 hectares) of woodland. The Academy trains state and local law enforcement agencies, which are invited to the law enforcement training center. The FBI units that reside at Quantico are the Field and Police Training Unit, Firearms Training Unit, Forensic Science Research and Training Center, Technology Services Unit (TSU), Investigative Training Unit, Law Enforcement Communication Unit, Leadership and Management Science Units (LSMU), Physical Training Unit, New Agents' Training Unit (NATU), Practical Applications Unit (PAU), the Investigative Computer Training Unit, and the College of Analytical Studies.

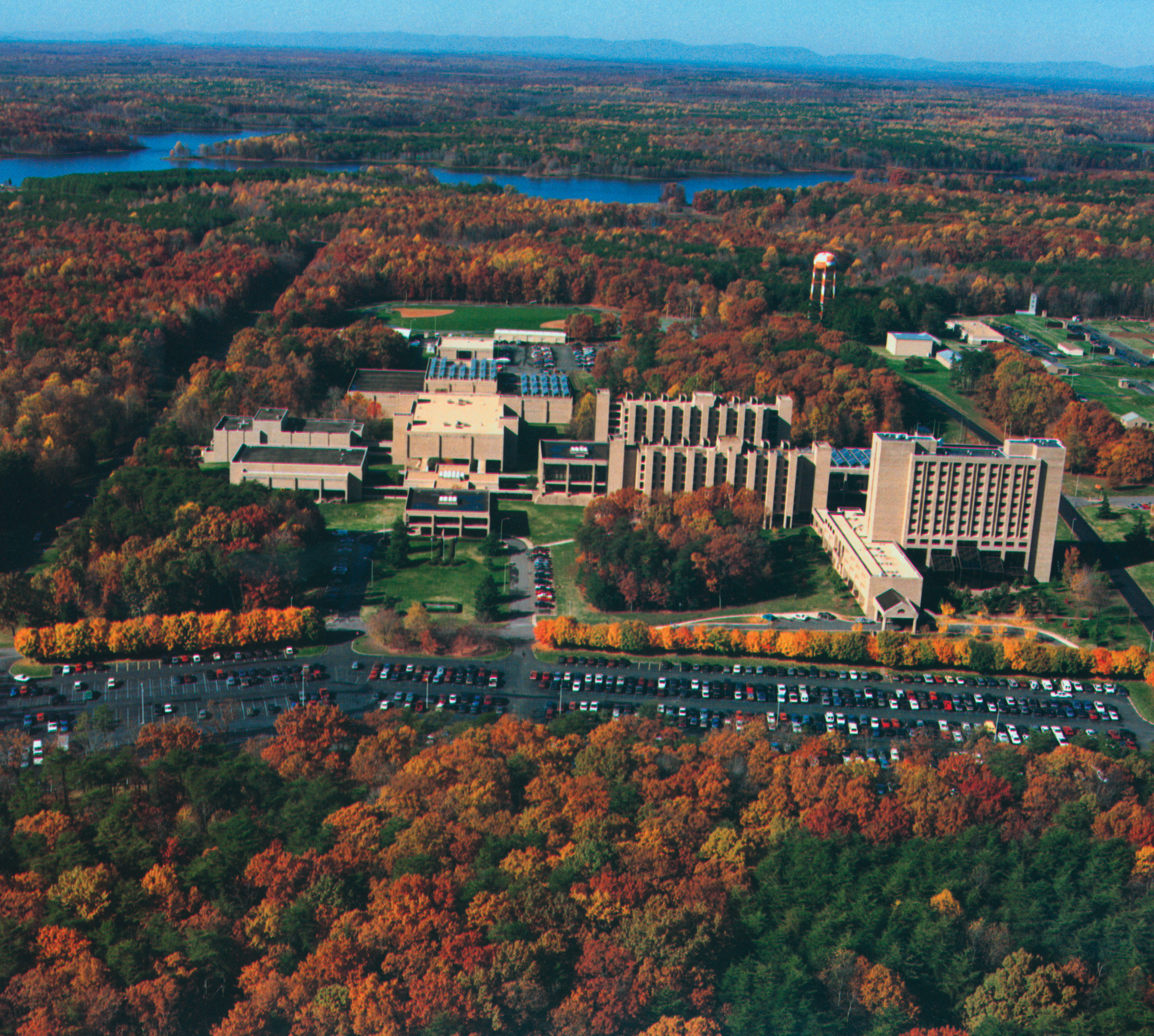
The FBI Academy, located in Quantico, Virginia

In 2000, the FBI began the Trilogy project to upgrade its outdated information technology (IT) infrastructure. This project, originally scheduled to take three years and cost around $380 million, ended up over budget and behind schedule. Efforts to deploy modern computers and networking equipment were generally successful, but attempts to develop new investigation software, outsourced to Science Applications International Corporation (SAIC), were not. Virtual Case File, or VCF, as the software was known, was plagued by poorly defined goals, and repeated changes in management.

In January 2005, more than two years after the software was originally planned for completion, the FBI abandoned the project. At least $100 million, and much more by some estimates, was spent on the project, which never became operational. The FBI has been forced to continue using its decade-old Automated Case Support system, which IT experts consider woefully inadequate. In March 2005, the FBI announced it was beginning a new, more ambitious software project, code-named Sentinel, which they expected to complete by 2009.

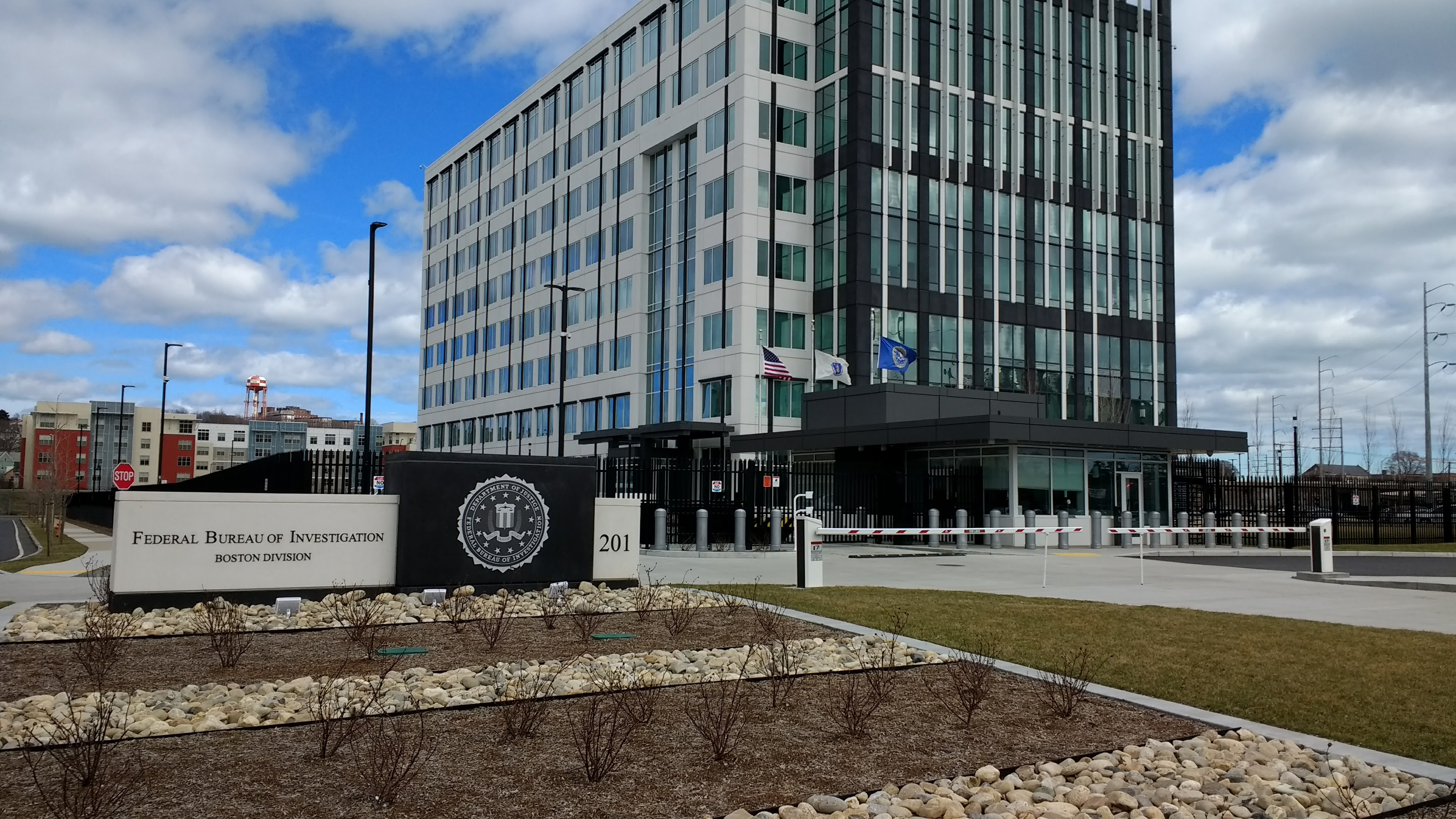
The FBI Field Office in Chelsea, Massachusetts

Carnivore was an electronic eavesdropping software system implemented by the FBI during the Clinton administration; it was designed to monitor email and electronic communications. After prolonged negative coverage in the press, the FBI changed the name of its system from "Carnivore" to "DCS1000". DCS is reported to stand for "Digital Collection System"; the system has the same functions as before. The Associated Press reported in mid-January 2005 that the FBI essentially abandoned the use of Carnivore in 2001, in favor of commercially available software, such as NarusInsight.

The Criminal Justice Information Services (CJIS) Division is located in Clarksburg, West Virginia. Organized beginning in 1991, the office opened in 1995 as the youngest agency division. The complex is the length of three football fields. It provides a main repository for information in various data systems. Under the roof of the CJIS are the programs for the National Crime Information Center (NCIC), Uniform Crime Reporting (UCR), Fingerprint Identification, Integrated Automated Fingerprint Identification System (IAFIS), NCIC 2000, and the National Incident-Based Reporting System (NIBRS). Many state and local agencies use these data systems as a source for their own investigations and contribute to the database using secure communications. FBI provides these tools of sophisticated identification and information services to local, state, federal, and international law enforcement agencies.

The FBI heads the National Virtual Translation Center, which provides "timely and accurate translations of foreign intelligence for all elements of the Intelligence Community".

In June 2021, the FBI held a groundbreaking for its planned FBI Innovation Center, set to be built in Huntsville, Alabama. The Innovation Center is to be part of a large, college-like campus costing a total of $1.3 billion in Redstone Arsenal and will act as a center for cyber threat intelligence, data analytics, and emerging threat training.

== Personnel ==
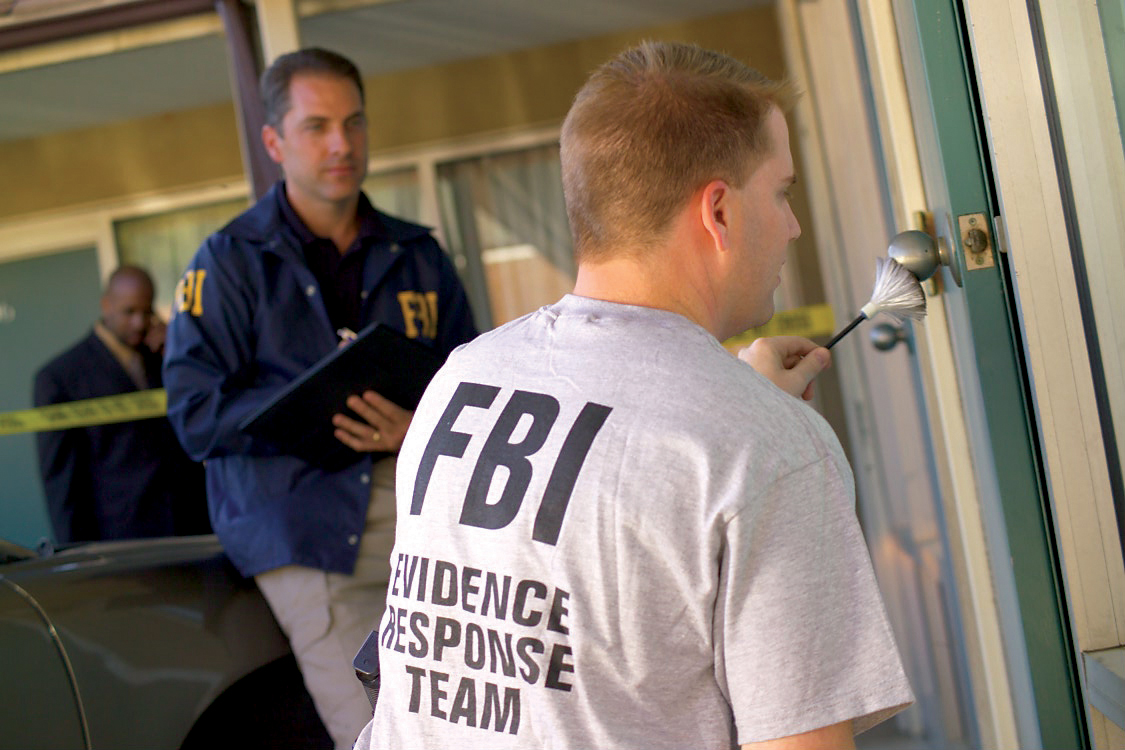
An FBI evidence response team

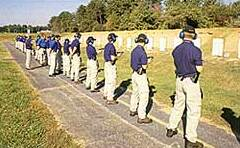
Agents in training on the FBI Academy firing range

As of December 31, 2009, the FBI had a total of 33,852 employees. That includes 13,412 special agents and 20,420 support professionals, such as intelligence analysts, language specialists, scientists, information technology specialists, and other professionals.

=== Line of duty deaths ===
According to the Officer Down Memorial Page 87 FBI agents and two K9s have died in the line of duty from 1925 to February 2021.

=== Hiring process ===
To apply to become an FBI agent, one must be between the ages of 23 and 37, unless one is a preference-eligible veteran, in which case one may apply after age 37. The applicant must also hold U.S. citizenship, be of high moral character, have a clean record, and hold at least a four-year bachelor's degree. At least three years of professional work experience prior to application is also required. All FBI employees require a Top Secret (TS) security clearance, and in many instances, employees need a TS/SCI (Top Secret/Sensitive Compartmented Information) clearance.

To obtain a security clearance, all potential FBI personnel must pass a series of Single Scope Background Investigations (SSBI), which are conducted by the Office of Personnel Management. Special agent candidates also have to pass a Physical Fitness Test (PFT), which includes a 300-meter run, one-minute sit-ups, maximum push-ups, and a 1.5-mile (2.4 km) run. Personnel must pass a polygraph test with questions including possible drug use. Applicants who fail polygraphs may not gain employment with the FBI. Up until 1975, the FBI had a minimum height requirement of 5 feet 7 inches (170 cm).

=== BOI and FBI directors ===
FBI directors are appointed (nominated) by the president of the United States and must be confirmed by the United States Senate to serve a term of office of ten years, subject to resignation or removal by the president at his/her discretion before their term ends. Additional terms are allowed following the same procedure.

J. Edgar Hoover, appointed by President Calvin Coolidge in 1924, was by far the longest-serving director, serving until his death in 1972. In 1968, Congress passed legislation, as part of the Omnibus Crime Control and Safe Streets Act of 1968, requiring Senate confirmation of appointments of future directors. As the incumbent, this legislation did not apply to Hoover. The last FBI director was Christopher Wray. The current FBI director is Kash Patel, appointed by President Donald Trump.

The FBI director is responsible for the day-to-day operations at the FBI. Along with the deputy director, the director makes sure cases and operations are handled correctly. The director also is in charge of making sure the leadership in the FBI field offices is staffed with qualified agents. Before the Intelligence Reform and Terrorism Prevention Act was passed in the wake of the September 11 attacks, the FBI director would directly brief the president of the United States on any issues that arise from within the FBI. Since then, the director now reports to the director of national intelligence (DNI), who in turn reports to the president.

== Firearms ==
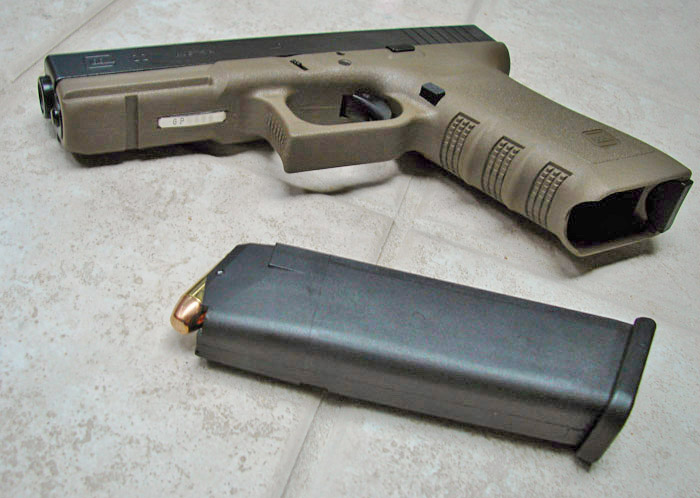
A Glock 22 pistol in .40 S&W caliber

Upon qualification, an FBI special agent is issued a full-size Glock 22 or compact Glock 23 semi-automatic pistol, both of which are chambered in the .40 S&W cartridge. In May 1997, the FBI officially adopted the Glock, in .40 S&W, for general agent use, and first issued it to New Agent Class 98-1 in October 1997. At present, the Glock 23 "FG&R" (finger groove and rail; either 3rd generation or "Gen4") is the issue sidearm.

New agents are issued firearms, on which they must qualify, on successful completion of their training at the FBI Academy. The Glock 26 (subcompact 9×19mm Parabellum), Glock 23 and Glock 27 (.40 S&W compact and subcompact, respectively) are authorized as secondary weapons. Special agents are also authorized to purchase and qualify with the Glock 21 in .45 ACP.

Special agents of the FBI Hostage Rescue Team (HRT) and regional SWAT teams are issued the Springfield Armory Professional Model 1911 pistol in .45 ACP.

In June 2016, the FBI awarded Glock a contract for new handguns. Unlike the currently issued .40 S&W chambered Glock pistols, the new Glocks will be chambered for 9x19mm Parabellum. The contract is for the full-size Glock 17M and the compact Glock 19M. The "M" means the Glocks have been modified to meet government standards specified by a 2015 government request for proposal.

== Publications ==
The FBI Law Enforcement Bulletin is published monthly by the FBI Law Enforcement Communication Unit, with articles of interest to state and local law enforcement personnel. First published in 1932 as Fugitives Wanted by Police, the FBI Law Bulletin covers topics including law enforcement technology and issues, such as crime mapping and use of force, as well as recent criminal justice research, and ViCAP alerts, on wanted suspects and key cases.

The FBI also publishes some reports for both law enforcement personnel as well as regular citizens covering topics including law enforcement, terrorism, cybercrime, white-collar crime, violent crime, and statistics. The vast majority of federal government publications covering these topics are published by the Office of Justice Programs agencies of the United States Department of Justice, and disseminated through the National Criminal Justice Reference Service.

=== Crime statistics ===
During the 1920s the FBI began issuing crime reports by gathering numbers from local police departments. Due to limitations of this system that were discovered during the 1960s and 1970s—victims often simply did not report crimes to the police in the first place—the Department of Justice developed an alternative method of tallying crime, the victimization survey.

==== Uniform Crime Reports ====
The Uniform Crime Reports (UCR) compile data from over 17,000 law enforcement agencies across the country. They provide detailed data regarding the volume of crimes to include arrest, clearance (or closing a case), and law enforcement officer information. The UCR focuses its data collection on violent crimes, hate crimes, and property crimes. Created in the 1920s, the UCR system has not proven to be as uniform as its name implies. The UCR data only reflect the most serious offense in the case of connected crimes and has a very restrictive definition of rape. Since about 93% of the data submitted to the FBI is in this format, the UCR stands out as the publication of choice as most states require law enforcement agencies to submit this data.

Preliminary Annual Uniform Crime Report for 2006 was released on June 4, 2006. The report shows violent crime offenses rose 1.3%, but the number of property crime offenses decreased 2.9% compared to 2005.

==== National Incident-Based Reporting System ====
The National Incident-Based Reporting System (NIBRS) crime statistics system aims to address limitations inherent in UCR data. The system is used by law enforcement agencies in the United States for collecting and reporting data on crimes. Local, state, and federal agencies generate NIBRS data from their records management systems. Data is collected on every incident and arrest in the Group A offense category. The Group A offenses are 46 specific crimes grouped in 22 offense categories. Specific facts about these offenses are gathered and reported in the NIBRS system. In addition to the Group A offenses, eleven Group B offenses are reported with only the arrest information. The NIBRS system is in greater detail than the summary-based UCR system. As of 2004, 5,271 law enforcement agencies submitted NIBRS data. That amount represents 20% of the United States population and 16% of the crime statistics data collected by the FBI.

== eGuardian ==
eGuardian is the name of an FBI system, launched in January 2009, to share tips about possible terror threats with local police agencies. The program aims to get law enforcement at all levels sharing data quickly about suspicious activity and people.

eGuardian enables near real-time sharing and tracking of terror information and suspicious activities with local, state, tribal, and federal agencies. The eGuardian system is a spin-off of a similar but classified tool called Guardian that has been used inside the FBI, and shared with vetted partners since 2005.

== Controversies ==
Throughout its history, the FBI has been the subject of many controversies, both at home and abroad.

- Operation Pacifier and child pornography distribution – Described as "the largest distributor of child pornography," the FBI has operated more than half of the child porn websites on the dark web to facilitate sting operations. Consequently, the FBI's actions have been criticized as hypocritical and as increasing the ease of access and prevalence of child pornography on the internet.
- Files on Puerto Rican independence advocates – Congressman Luiz Gutierrez revealed that Pedro Albizu Campos and his Nationalist political party had been watched for a decade-long period in the 1930s.
- The Whitey Bulger case – The FBI, specifically the Boston Field Office was, and continues to be, criticized for its handling of Boston criminal Whitey Bulger. As a result of Bulger acting as an informant, the agency turned a blind eye to his activities as an exchange.
- Latin America – For decades during the Cold War, the FBI placed agents to monitor the governments of Caribbean and Latin American nations.
- According to WikiLeaks documents, the FBI trained agents from the Egyptian State Security which is notorious for torturing detainees and suppressing political dissent. Egyptian State Security agents were provided training opportunities at the FBI's academy in Quantico, Virginia.
- Domestic surveillance – In 1985, it was found that the FBI had made use of surveillance devices on numerous American citizens between 1940 and 1960.
- Robert Hanssen – In what is described by the US Department of Justice (DOJ) as "possibly the worst intelligence disaster in U.S. history". Hanssen managed to evade the FBI as he simultaneously sold thousands of classified American documents to Soviet intelligence operatives.
- Viola Liuzzo – Gary Thomas Rowe, an FBI informant who at the time was also an active member of the Ku Klux Klan, assisted in the murder of Viola Liuzzo (a civil rights activist) in 1965, and afterwards, defamatory rumors were spread by the Bureau about the victim.
- Ruby Ridge (1992) was a shootout between the FBI and Randy Weaver over his failure to appear for weapons charges.
- Waco siege (1993) was a failed raid by the ATF that resulted in the death of 4 ATF agents and 6 Branch Davidians. The FBI and US military got involved with the 51 day siege that followed. The building ended up burning down killing 76 including 26 children. This is what motivated Timothy McVeigh (along with Ruby Ridge) to carry out the Oklahoma City bombing (1995).
- Associated Press (AP) impersonation case – A Bureau agent, masquerading as an AP journalist, placed surveillance software in the personal computer of a minor. This resulted in a series of conflicts between the news agency and the FBI.
- Stoneman Douglas High School shooting – A statement from the FBI confirmed that it had failed to act on a tip warning of the possibility of the shooting over a month prior to its occurrence, which may have prevented the tragedy outright.
- 1993 World Trade Center bombing – Emad Salem, an FBI informant and a key witness in the trial of Ramzi Yousef, Abdul Hakim Murad, and Wali Khan Amin Shah, stated that the bomb itself was built under supervision from the FBI.
- Arctic Frost investigation – An FBI investigation into alleged efforts to overturn the 2020 presidential election that issued 197 subpoenas targeting approximately 430 Republican individuals and entities, including nine members of Congress, and involved phone metadata analysis of eight Republican senators and one representative. DOJ Inspector General Michael E. Horowitz stated the subpoenas "may implicate separate and important constitutional considerations," including "the separation of powers" and "the Constitution's Speech or Debate Clause." FBI Director Kash Patel disbanded the related Public Corruption Unit in October 2025.
- In 2020, the FBI and Customs and Border Protection used drones for surveillance of protests by the Black Lives Matter movement. In 2020, the FBI paid an informant to pose as organizer during the George Floyd protests in Denver, Colorado. This informant infiltrated and undermined protest movements by accusing other genuine activists of being FBI informants.
- FBI Richmond Catholic Memo Investigation – In January 2023, the FBI Richmond Field Office produced an internal memo identifying "radical traditionalist Catholics" as potential domestic violent extremists, which drew controversy when leaked. A DOJ Inspector General review found no malicious intent but documented failures in analytic tradecraft and improper conflation of religious beliefs with terrorism risk; congressional investigations reported coordination with other field offices.
- During the 2026 Delaney Hall protests, FBI agents contacted protesters who had been arrested in an attempt to gather information about protesters. The FBI also contacted the families and friends of arrested protesters, and FBI agents performed knock and talks at protester homes. The Intercept characterized this as the FBI trying to "flip" protesters into informants, and public defenders representing the arrestees argued this violated the protesters' rights to legal representation.

Specific practices include:

- Internal investigations of shootings – A professor of criminal justice at the University of Nebraska Omaha suggested that FBI internal reports found a questionably high number of weapon discharges by its agents to be justified.
- Covert operations on political groups – Political groups deemed disruptive have been investigated and discredited by the FBI in the aim of "protecting national security, preventing violence, and maintaining the existing social and political order".
- FBI surveillance since 2010 – In the years since 2010, it has been uncovered by various civil liberties groups (such as the American Civil Liberties Union [ACLU]) that the FBI earmarked disproportionate resources for the surveillance of left-leaning movements and political organizations. The FBI has also committed several breaches of the First Amendment in this time.
- Files on U.S. citizens – The Bureau kept files on certain individuals for varying reasons and lengths of time, notably, Elvis Presley, Frank Sinatra, John Denver.
- Entrapment - The FBI has been criticized for its use of entrapment, where agent provocateurs attempt to incite individuals into committing illegal acts. Notable critics of FBI entrapment such as Human Rights Watch and the ACLU note that entrapment cases often target impoverished individuals or those with mental or emotional disabilities and that these cases have an adverse effect on marginalized groups.

== Media portrayal ==
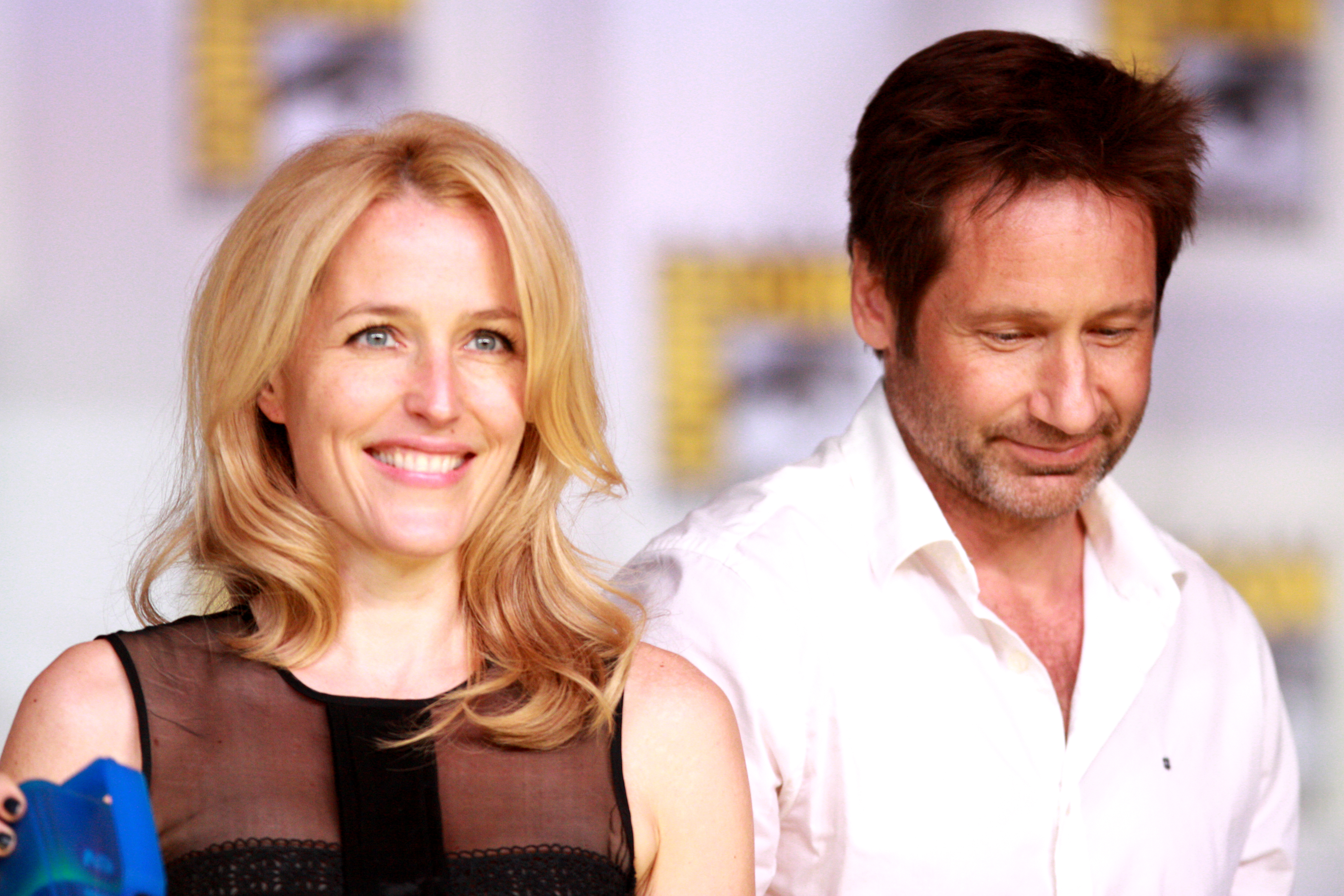
The popular TV series The X-Files depicts the fictional FBI Special Agents Dana Scully (Gillian Anderson) and Fox Mulder (David Duchovny) who investigate paranormal phenomena.

The FBI has been frequently depicted in popular media since the 1930s. The bureau has participated to varying degrees, which has ranged from direct involvement in the creative process of film or TV series development, to providing consultation on operations and closed cases. A few of the notable portrayals of the FBI on television are the series The X-Files, which started in 1993 and concluded its eleventh season in early 2018, and concerned investigations into paranormal phenomena by five fictional special agents, and the fictional Counter Terrorist Unit (CTU) agency in the TV drama 24, which is patterned after the FBI Counterterrorism Division.

The 1991 movie Point Break depicts an undercover FBI agent who infiltrated a gang of bank robbers. The 1997 movie Donnie Brasco is based on the true story of undercover FBI agent Joseph D. Pistone infiltrating the Mafia. The 2005–2020 television series Criminal Minds, that follows the team members of the FBI's Behavioral Analysis Unit (BAU) in the pursuit of serial killers. The 2017 TV series Riverdale where one of the main characters is an FBI agent. The 2015 TV series Quantico, titled after the location of the Bureau's training facility, deals with probationary and special agents, not all of whom, within the show's format, may be fully reliable or even trustworthy.

The 2018 series FBI, set in NYC that follows the personal and professional lives of the agents assigned to 26 Federal Plaza (NYC FBI field office). FBI's first spin-off, titled FBI: Most Wanted (2020), follows the FBI's Fugitive Task Force in chasing down the America's most wanted criminals, and the second spin-off, FBI: International (2021), follows the FBI's International Fly Team that goes wherever they are needed in the world to protect the American's interests.

== Notable FBI personnel ==
- Edwin Atherton
- Ed Bethune
- Cassandra Chandler
- James Comey
- John Connolly
- Scott Curtis
- Alaska P. Davidson
- Sibel Edmonds
- W. Mark Felt
- James R. Fitzgerald
- Robert Hanssen
- J. Edgar Hoover
- Lon Horiuchi
- James Wormley Jones
- Sylvia E. Mathis
- John McClurg
- Richard Miller
- Robert Mueller
- Eric O'Neill
- John P. O'Neill
- M.K. Palmore
- Joseph D. Pistone
- Melvin Purvis
- Coleen Rowley
- Ali Soufan
- Sue Thomas
- Clyde Tolson
- Frederic Whitehurst

== See also ==
- Diplomatic Security Service (DSS)
- FBI Agents Association
- FBI Honorary Medals
- FBI Victims Identification Project
- History of espionage
- Inspector
- Law enforcement in the United States
- List of United States state and local law enforcement agencies
- Society of Former Special Agents of the Federal Bureau of Investigation
- State bureau of investigation
- United States Marshals Service (USMS)
