= Communications Exploitation Section =

The Communications Exploitation Section (CXS), established in December 2002, is an office of the Operations II branch of the FBI Counterterrorism Division, which is tasked with analyzing captured communications data (such as phone call records and internet traffic) to identify and monitor "terrorist" networks.

From 2003 to 2005, CXS sent out 739 "exigent letters" to U.S. telephone companies requesting that they send phone call records for their customers.

== See also ==
- Communications Assistance For Law Enforcement Act
- Surveillance
- War on terrorism
