= FBI Academy =

Academy located in Quantico, Virginia

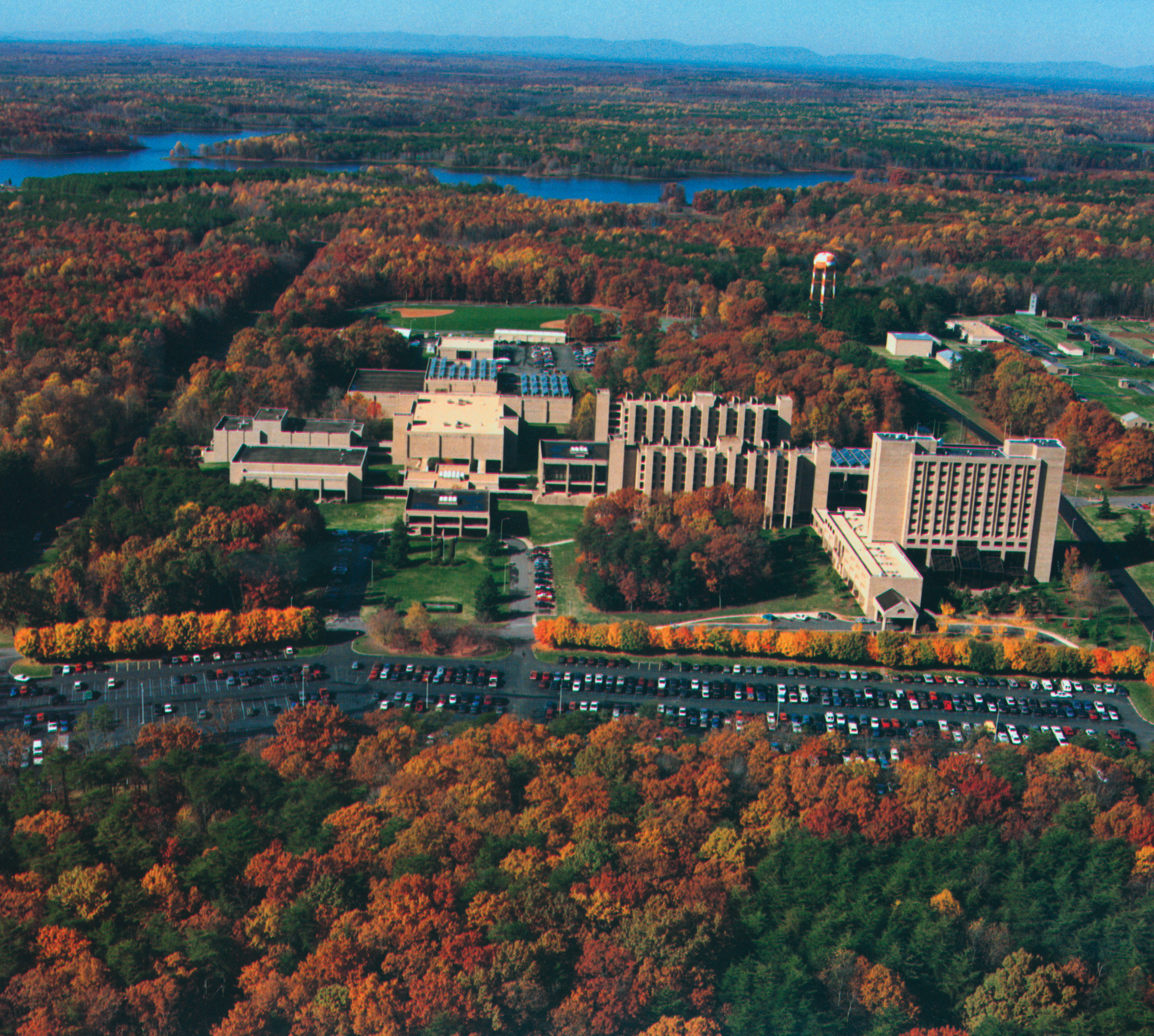
- Aerial image of the FBI Academy
- Active: May 7, 1972 – present (54 years, 6 months)
- Country: United States
- Agency: Federal Bureau of Investigation
- Type: National law enforcement training facility
- Part of: Human Resources Branch: Training Division
- Location: Marine Corps Base Quantico, Virginia; 38°31′48.79″N 77°26′45.34″W

Structure
- Subunits: Behavioral Science Unit

Notables
- Program(s): FBI National Academy

Website
- www.fbi.gov/services/training-academy

The FBI Academy is the Federal Bureau of Investigation's law enforcement training and research center near the town of Quantico in Prince William County, Virginia. The academy occupies 547 acres (221 ha) on the US Marine Corps Base Quantico. It is located 36 miles outside Washington, D.C., and is a full service national training facility. In addition to training new FBI agents at the facility, the Training Division also instructs special agents, intelligence analysts, law enforcement officers, Drug Enforcement Administration agents, and foreign partners.

To apply to become a special agent individuals must be a 23 to 36 aged U.S. citizen, amongst other prerequisites - within the academy training is completed after approximately 18 weeks equivalent to more than 800 hours.

== History ==
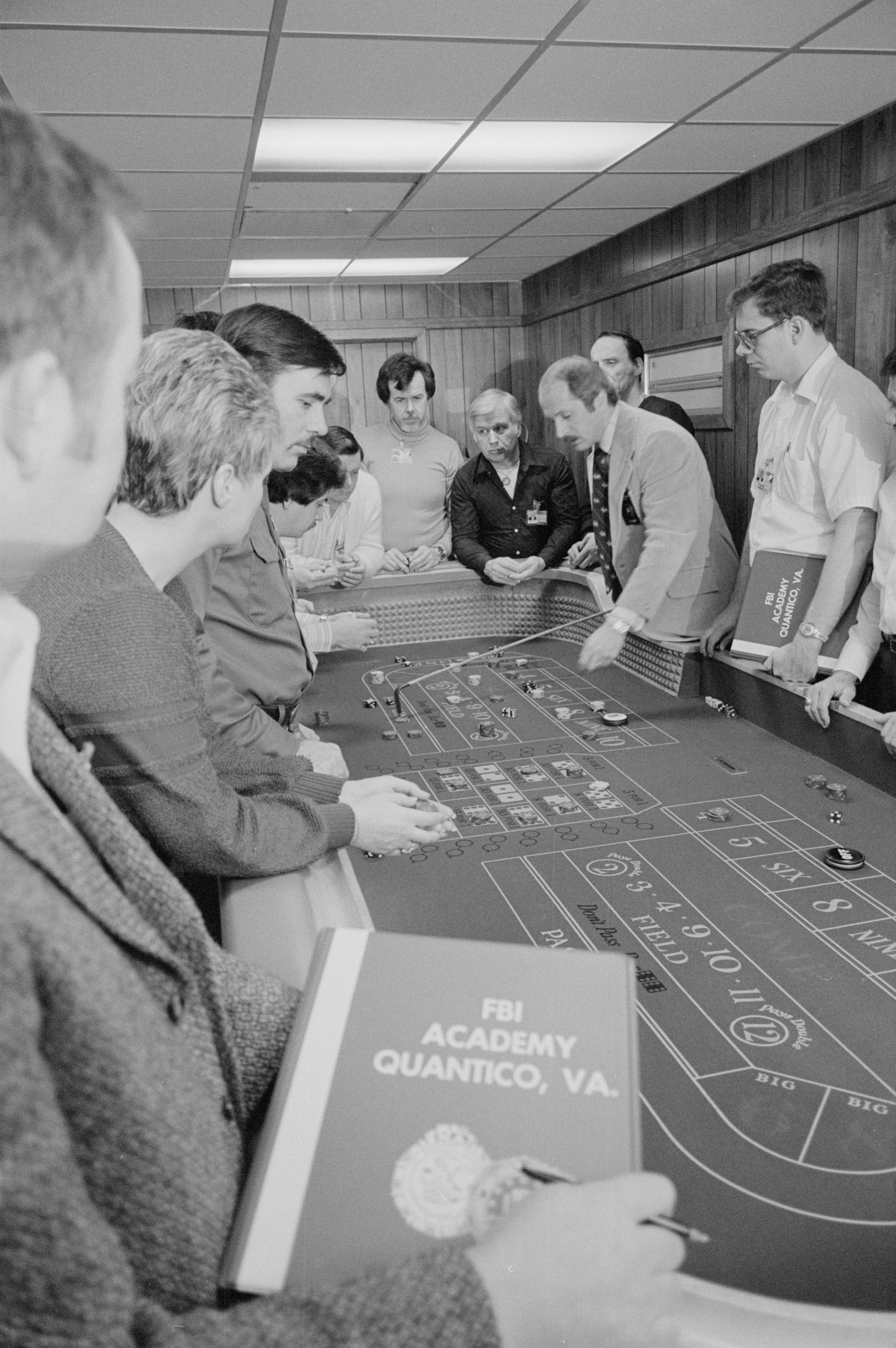
Members of the FBI Academy standing around a craps table, 1980

Operated by the bureau's Training Division, the academy was first opened for use on May 7, 1972, on 385 acres (156 ha) of woodland. In 1933, FBI agents were granted the power to possess a firearm and to arrest, and so the academy was opened to train agents. The Marine Corps granted them access to their firing ranges in Quantico, Virginia. After outgrowing the Marine Corps firing ranges, the FBI was granted permission to build their own firing range and classroom on the base. Additional sections were added over time, including a new wing, kitchen, and basement.

As the FBI grew, it required a larger facility. In 1965, the FBI received approval for a new complex at Quantico and construction began in 1969. The new facility opened in 1972, with more than two dozen classrooms, eight conference rooms, a large auditorium, a gym, pool, library, and a new firing range.

In June 2025, the FBI announced that it is considering to move the FBI National Academy from the present site of Quantico to Huntsville, Alabama.

== Training facilities ==
Elite units such as the Hostage Rescue Team (HRT), Evidence Response Teams (ERT), Special Weapons and Tactics (SWAT), and about 1,000 police leaders from across the world attend the FBI Academy and utilize its training facilities to improve their skills.

The academy provides several training programs, including Firearms, Hogan's Alley (a training complex simulating a small town), Tactical and Emergency Vehicle Operations Center (TEVOC), Survival Skills, and Law Enforcement Executive Development. To meet the needs of these training programs, the facility has a 1.1-mile-long oval road track with a precision obstacle for conducting TEVOC. Hogan's Alley is a mock town built with the help of Hollywood set designers in order to give realistic training to agents. It helps the agents experience realistic and stressful scenarios to better prepare them for real-life situations.

The academy's facilities include a newly renovated 20,000-square-foot (1,900 m^{2}) aquatic training center. Aquatic classes are used to boost cardio-respiratory endurance, muscular strength, flexibility, power and speed. While new agent trainees utilize the facility to receive CPR and lifesaving skills, larger units such as HRT officers receive over 450 hours of training that include advanced scuba diving, nighttime diving, rescue diving, and rescue swimming in the facilities. The FBI and DEA trainees also have classes that are focused on physical conditioning, basic water survival skills, and team work.

== See also ==
- CIA University
- RCMP Academy, Canada
- FSB Academy, Russia
- Criminal Minds, TV series
- The Silence of the Lambs, Film
- Quantico, TV series
- Mindhunter, TV series
