= FBI Counterterrorism Division =

Division of the U.S. Federal Bureau of Investigation

Counterterrorism Division
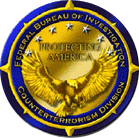
- Emblem of the Counterterrorism Division
- Active: November 21, 1999 – present (26 years, 2 months)
- Country: United States
- Agency: Federal Bureau of Investigation
- Part of: National Security Branch
- Headquarters: J. Edgar Hoover Building; Washington, D.C.
- Abbreviation: CTD

Commanders
- Current commander: Assistant Director Don Holstead

The Counterterrorism Division (CTD) is a division of the National Security Branch of the Federal Bureau of Investigation. CTD investigates terrorist threats inside the United States, provides information on terrorists outside the country, and tracks known terrorists worldwide. In the wake of the September 11 attacks in 2001, CTD's funding and manpower have significantly increased.

The Division employs counterterrorism field operations organized into squads, the number of which varies according to the amount and diversity of activity in the local field office's jurisdiction. Larger field offices, such as Los Angeles, maintain counterterrorism squads for each major terrorist group, as well as for domestic terrorism and terrorist financing, while smaller field offices combined such responsibilities across two to three squads.

== Leadership ==
The Counterterrorism Division is headed by an assistant director, who reports to the executive assistant director of the FBI National Security Branch.

== Organization ==
The Counterterrorism Division has several branches:

- Intelligence Branch
- Operations Branch I
- Operations Branch II
- Operations Branch III
- Analytical Branch
- Operational Support Branch

Operations Branch I is composed of two sections: International Terrorism Operations Section I (ITOS-I) and International Terrorism Operations Section II (ITOS-II). The ITOS-I covers al Qaeda terrorist activity on a regional basis in the United States and abroad. ITOS-II focuses on four non-al Qaeda groups: Hamas, Iran and Hezbollah, Iraq/Syria/Libya, and other global terrorist groups. ITOS II has a Central Intelligence Agency officer serving as Deputy Section Chief, and an FBI agent is detailed to the CIA's Counterterrorism Center as that unit's deputy director.

Operations Branch II includes three more disparate sections: the Domestic Terrorism Operations Section (DTOS), Exploitation Threat Section (XTS), and Terrorist Financing Operations Section (TFOS).

  - The DTOS mission is overseeing and providing operational support to FBI domestic terrorism investigations nationwide.
  - The TFOS is an operational and coordinating entity. It directs terrorism financing investigations and works jointly with partners to block and freeze assets. However, its primary role is to coordinate and support the financial components of terrorism investigations conducted by ITOS I and II. The TFOS mission is to identify, investigate, prosecute, disrupt, and incrementally dismantle all terrorist-related financial and fund-raising activities. The section is composed of four units:
    - Radical Fundamentalist Financial Investigative Unit
    - Domestic WMD and Global Financial Investigations Unit
    - Global Extremist Financial Investigations Unit
    - Financial Intelligence Analysis Unit.

The Analytical Branch includes two sections: the Counterterrorism Analysis Section (which supports Operations I and II) and the Terrorism Reports and Requirements Section (TRRS). The Branch also includes a Strategic Assessment and Analysis Unit, Production and Publications Unit.

The Operational Support Branch manages the CTD's administrative and resource functions, FBI detailees to other agencies, and the Foreign Terrorist Tracking Task Force. The various local Joint Terrorism Task Forces falls under the domain of this branch.

== Notable former members ==
- Mark F. Giuliano, former assistant director of the FBI Counterterrorism Division, former 15th deputy director of the Federal Bureau of Investigation
- Andrew McCabe (born 1968), former agent in the FBI Counterterrorism Division, former acting director of the FBI
- Max Wise (born 1975), former agent in the FBI Counterterrorism Division, serving as a member of the Kentucky Senate

== See also ==
- MI5
- Counter Terrorism Command (SO15)
- Direction de la surveillance du territoire (DST)
- General Commissariat of Information (CGI)
- Civil Guard Information Service (SIGC)
- Tokyo Metropolitan Police Department Public Security Bureau
- Interpol
