= Christopher Raia =

American law enforcement officer (born 1976)

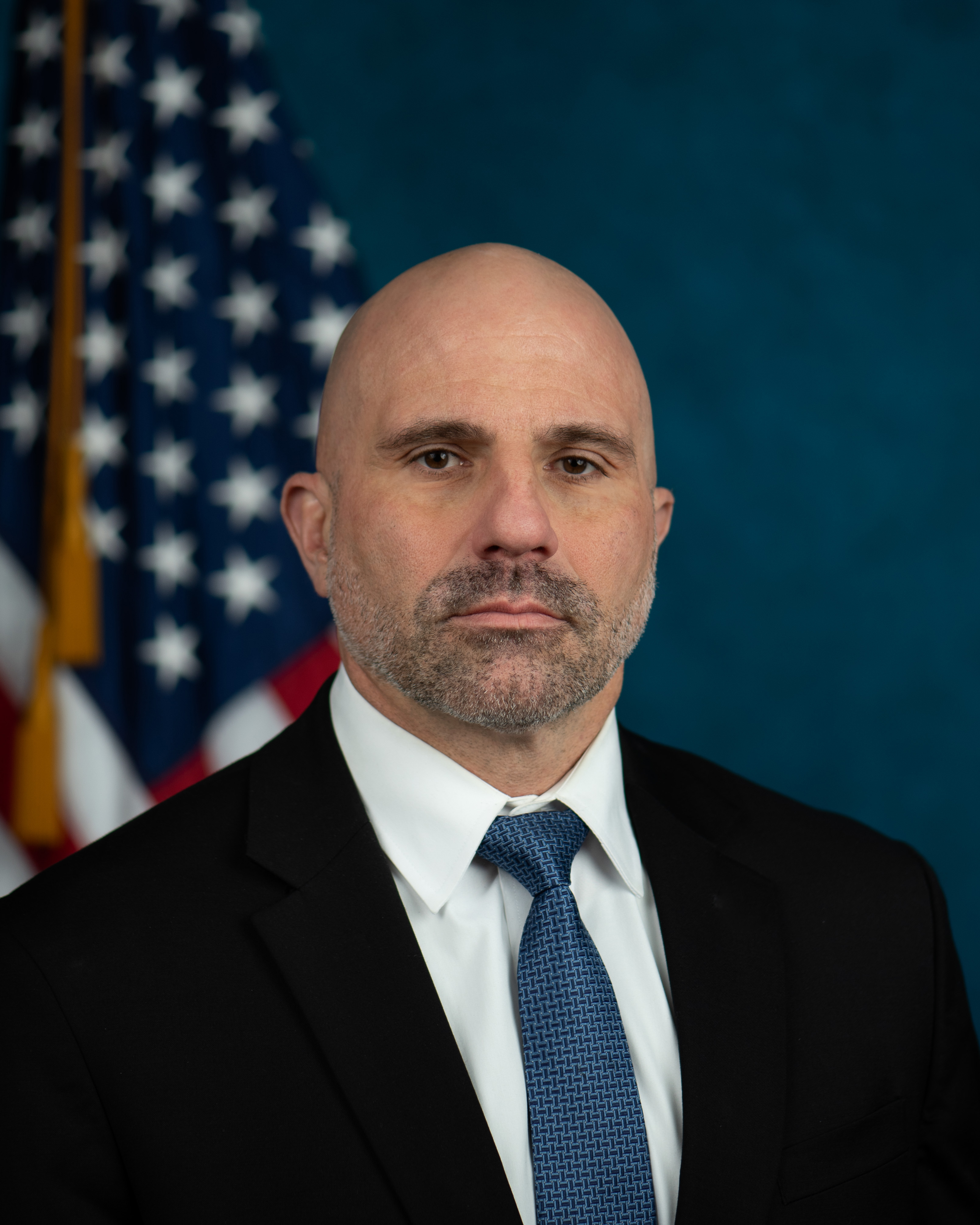
- Official portrait, 2026

21st Deputy Director of the Federal Bureau of Investigation
- Incumbent
- Assumed office January 12, 2026
- President: Donald Trump
- Preceded by: Dan Bongino

Personal details
- Born: Christopher Gilbert Raia; April 17, 1976 (age 50) Illinois, U.S.
- Party: Republican
- Spouse: Kristen Mason (m. 2003)
- Children: 3
- Education: United States Coast Guard Academy (BS)

Military service
- Branch/service: United States Coast Guard
- Years of service: 1998–2003
- Rank: Lieutenant

Christopher Gilbert Raia (born April 17, 1976) is an American law enforcement officer who has served as Deputy Director of the Federal Bureau of Investigation since 2026. Raia served as the assistant director in charge of the Federal Bureau of Investigation's New York City field office from March 2025 to January 2026, before being sworn in as deputy director.

== Early life and education (1976–1998) ==
Christopher Gilbert Raia was born on April 17, 1976, in Illinois. He attended Michigan City High School in Michigan City, Indiana and the United States Coast Guard Academy.

== Career ==
=== United States Coast Guard (1994–2003) ===
He graduated from the U.S. Coast Guard Academy in 1998. He then served in Florida as a United States Coast Guard Lieutenant.

=== FBI Counterterrorism Division (2003–2026) ===
In 2003, Raia joined the Federal Bureau of Investigation as a special agent. He was the FBI case agent of the 2011 alleged Iran assassination plot by Mansour Arbabsiar and worked the investigation jointly with the DEA which utilized a Drug Enforcement Administration informant. The Operation was named Operation Red Coalition and resulted in the successful prosecution of Arbabsiar, who received a 25-year prison sentence.

Raia was involved in the investigation into the 2025 New Orleans truck attack. In March 2025, Kash Patel, the director of the Federal Bureau of Investigation, fired James Dennehy, the assistant director in charge of the New York City field office. Raia succeeded Dennehy. He led the prosecution of the pro-Palestinian activist Tarek Bazrouk and the 2025 NBA illegal gambling prosecution.

== Deputy Director of the FBI (2026–present) ==
In January 2026, The New York Times reported that Raia had been named as the deputy director of the Federal Bureau of Investigation, succeeding Dan Bongino.

== Personal life ==
In 2003, Raia married Kristen Mason; they have three children.
