= Deputy Director of the Federal Bureau of Investigation =

Senior United States government position

- Seal of the FBI

- Flag of the FBI

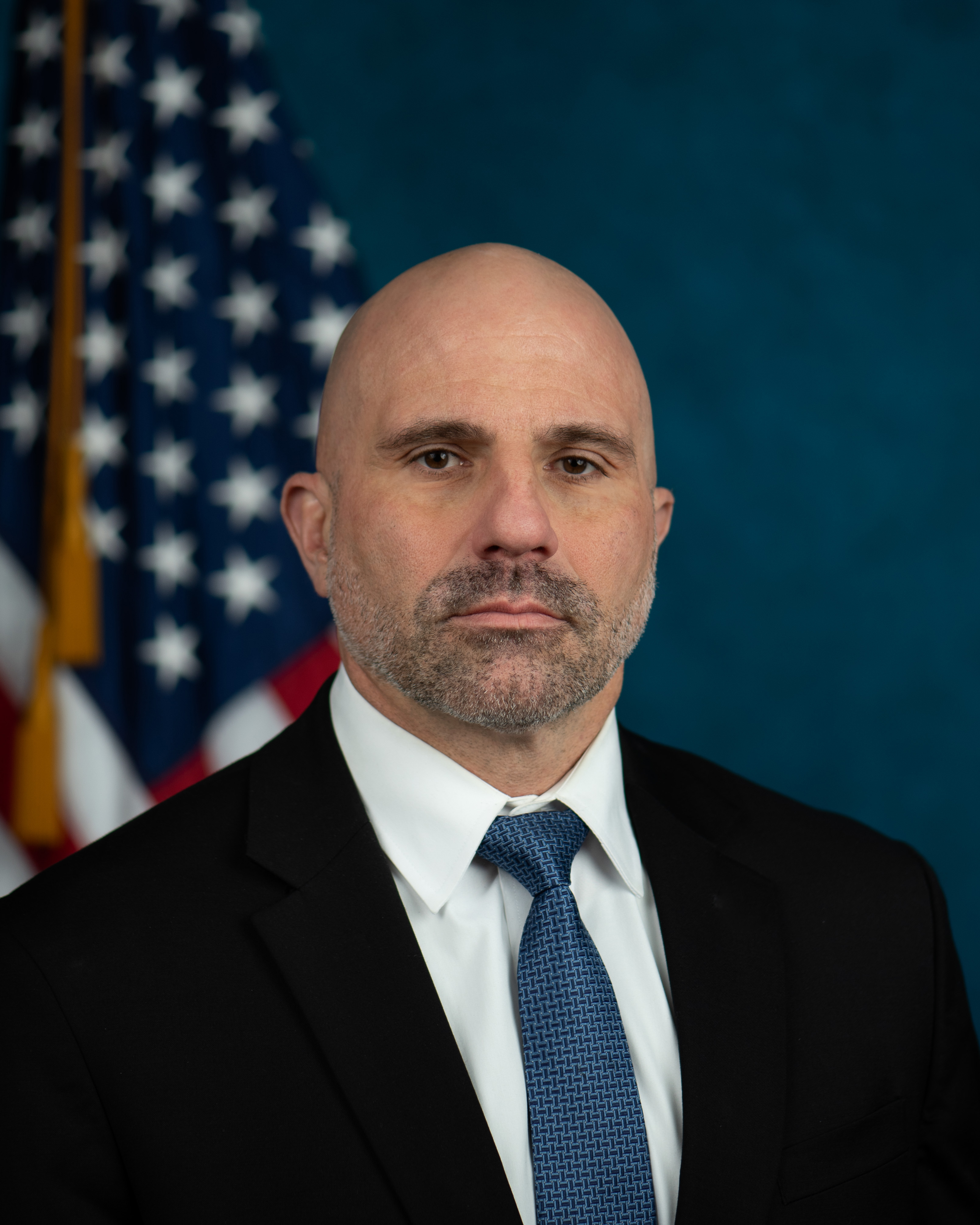
- Incumbent; Christopher Raia since January 12, 2026
- Reports to: Director of the Federal Bureau of Investigation
- Appointer: Director of the Federal Bureau of Investigation
- Inaugural holder: Clyde Tolson (BOI)
- Formation: 1930 (as Associate Director)
- Deputy: Associate Deputy Director of the Federal Bureau of Investigation

The deputy director of the Federal Bureau of Investigation (formerly known as the associate director) is a senior United States government position in the Federal Bureau of Investigation (FBI). The office is second in command to and appointed by the director of the Federal Bureau of Investigation. If the director is absent or the position is vacant, the deputy director automatically takes on the additional title and role of acting director. The office is also the highest position attainable within the FBI without being appointed by the president of the United States. Responsibilities as deputy director include assisting the director and leading prominent investigations. All other FBI executives and special agents in charge report to the director through the deputy director.

Dan Bongino became the 20th deputy director in March 2025. In August 2025, the Department of Justice announced a co-deputy structure, with Missouri attorney general Andrew Bailey appointed to serve alongside Bongino. Bailey assumed the role September 15, 2025 after resigning as attorney general. Bongino resigned in January 2026 and was succeeded by Christopher Raia.

== History ==
From 1978 to 1987, the position of deputy director was not filled due to William Hedgcock Webster's decision to divide the deputy's responsibility between three positions.

== Deputy directors ==
No.	Portrait	Officeholder	Term		Director	President
No.	Portrait	Officeholder	Start	End	Director	President
1		Clyde Tolson	1930	May 2, 1972	J. Edgar Hoover	Herbert Hoover
1		Clyde Tolson	1930	May 2, 1972	J. Edgar Hoover	Franklin D. Roosevelt
1		Clyde Tolson	1930	May 2, 1972	J. Edgar Hoover	Harry S. Truman
1		Clyde Tolson	1930	May 2, 1972	J. Edgar Hoover	Dwight D. Eisenhower
1		Clyde Tolson	1930	May 2, 1972	J. Edgar Hoover	John F. Kennedy
1		Clyde Tolson	1930	May 2, 1972	J. Edgar Hoover	Lyndon B. Johnson
1		Clyde Tolson	1930	May 2, 1972	J. Edgar Hoover	Richard Nixon
2		Mark Felt	May 3, 1972	June 22, 1973	Vacant	Richard Nixon
3		James B. Adams	June 22, 1973	February 5, 1978	Clarence M. Kelley	Richard Nixon
3		James B. Adams	June 22, 1973	February 5, 1978	Clarence M. Kelley	Gerald Ford
3		James B. Adams	June 22, 1973	February 5, 1978	Clarence M. Kelley	Jimmy Carter
4		James B. Adams	April 6, 1978	May 11, 1979	William H. Webster	Jimmy Carter
5		Floyd I. Clarke	May 11, 1979	July 19, 1993	William H. Webster	Jimmy Carter
5		Floyd I. Clarke	May 11, 1979	July 19, 1993	William H. Webster	Ronald Reagan
5		Floyd I. Clarke	May 11, 1979	July 19, 1993	William S. Sessions	George H. W. Bush
5		Floyd I. Clarke	May 11, 1979	July 19, 1993	William S. Sessions	Bill Clinton
6		David G. Binney	February 1994	December 1994	Louis Freeh	Bill Clinton
7		Larry A. Potts	February 1995	May 2, 1995	Louis Freeh	Bill Clinton
7		Larry A. Potts	May 2, 1995	July 14, 1995	Louis Freeh	Bill Clinton
8		Weldon L. Kennedy	August 8, 1995	February 1997	Louis Freeh	Bill Clinton
9		William J. Esposito	February 28, 1997	September 30, 1997	Louis Freeh	Bill Clinton
10		Robert M. Bryant	October 1, 1997	October 31, 1999	Louis Freeh	Bill Clinton
11		Thomas J. Pickard	November 1, 1999	November 30, 2001	Louis Freeh	Bill Clinton
11		Thomas J. Pickard	November 1, 1999	November 30, 2001	Robert Mueller	George W. Bush
12		Bruce J. Gebhardt	2002	2004	Robert Mueller	George W. Bush
13		John S. Pistole	October 1, 2004	May 17, 2010	Robert Mueller	George W. Bush
13		John S. Pistole	October 1, 2004	May 17, 2010	Robert Mueller	Barack Obama
14		Timothy P. Murphy	July 8, 2010	August 31, 2011	Robert Mueller	Barack Obama
15		Sean M. Joyce	September 1, 2011	November 30, 2013	Robert Mueller	Barack Obama
15		Sean M. Joyce	September 1, 2011	November 30, 2013	James Comey	Barack Obama
16		Mark F. Giuliano	December 1, 2013	February 1, 2016	James Comey	Barack Obama
17		Andrew McCabe	February 1, 2016	January 29, 2018	James Comey	Barack Obama
17		Andrew McCabe	February 1, 2016	January 29, 2018	James Comey	Donald Trump
17		Andrew McCabe	February 1, 2016	January 29, 2018	Christopher A. Wray	Donald Trump
18		David Bowdich	January 29, 2018	April 13, 2018	Christopher A. Wray	Donald Trump
18		David Bowdich	April 13, 2018	February 1, 2021	Christopher A. Wray	Donald Trump
19		Paul Abbate	February 1, 2021	January 20, 2025	Christopher A. Wray	Joe Biden
–		Robert Kissane; Acting	January 20, 2025	March 17, 2025	Kash Patel	Donald Trump
20		Dan Bongino	March 17, 2025	January 3, 2026	Kash Patel	Donald Trump
21		Andrew Bailey (Note: Served concurrently with Dan Bongino as co-deputy director) (Note: Served concurrently with Christopher Raia as co-deputy director)	September 15, 2025	October 2, 2026	Kash Patel	Donald Trump
22		Christopher Raia	January 12, 2026	Incumbent	Kash Patel	Donald Trump
