= Freeh (disambiguation) =

Louis Freeh (born 1950) served as the fifth director of the Federal Bureau of Investigation from September 1993 to June 2001.

Freeh may also refer to:

- Freeh Group International Solutions, consulting firm founded by Louis Freeh
- Freeh Group Europe, affiliated European subsidiary
- "Freeh Report", a report on the Penn State child sex abuse scandal authored by Louis Freeh
- Mazyad Freeh (born 1989), Saudi football player
