= Michigan Militia =

Anti-government paramilitary organization

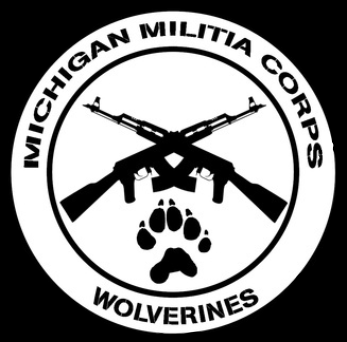
- Patch worn by members of the militia
- Leaders: Norman Olson (1994–1995); Lynn Van Huizen (1996–1998); Joe Pilchack (1998–1999); Ron Gaydosh (2000); Gordon Dean (2001); Clint Dare (2002–2009); Aubrey Stevens (2009–2010); Greg Sequin (2010–2011); Matt Savino (2011–2015); Myra Tasiemski (2015–present)
- Dates active: 1994–present
- Headquarters: Michigan, United States
- Active regions: Michigan, United States
- Ideology: Survivalism; American Constitutionalism; Militia constitutionalism Millennialism (factions)
- Size: ~6,000 (1994); Several hundred
- Part of: American militia movement Constitutional militia movement

The Michigan Militia is a paramilitary Michigan-based organization founded in 1994 by Norman Olson, a veteran of the U.S. Air Force. The group was formed in response to perceived encroachments by the federal government on the rights of citizens. It is part of the wider American militia movement.

== Organization ==
At its peak in the mid-1990s, the Michigan Militia Corps claimed to have 10,000 members, although its membership was estimated to be several hundred by 2010. The Militia's main areas of focus are paramilitary training and emergency response. They are also involved in search and rescue, community preparedness and disaster relief. In some brigades, participating in paramilitary training is not a requirement for membership.

== History ==
=== Origin ===
The Michigan Militia Corps (MMC) were founded in 1994 by Norman "Norm" Olson, a former US Air Force non-commissioned officer from Alanson, Michigan.

The early meetings of the Michigan militia were attended by Timothy McVeigh and Terry Nichols before they carried out the Oklahoma City bombing on April 19, 1995, which drew media attention to the organization. Olson published a press release blaming the Japanese for the bombing, supposedly in retaliation for a clandestine US-sponsored gas attack in the Tokyo subway system. The leadership of the MMC forced Olson to resign one month after the bombing.

On June 15, 1995, Olson testified before the United States Senate Subcommittee on Terrorism along with militia leaders from other states. His opening statement included the following words:

Not only does the Constitution specifically allow the formation of a Federal Army, it also recognizes the inherent right of the people to form militia. Further, it recognizes that the citizen and his personal armaments are the foundation of the militia.

=== Leadership conflicts ===
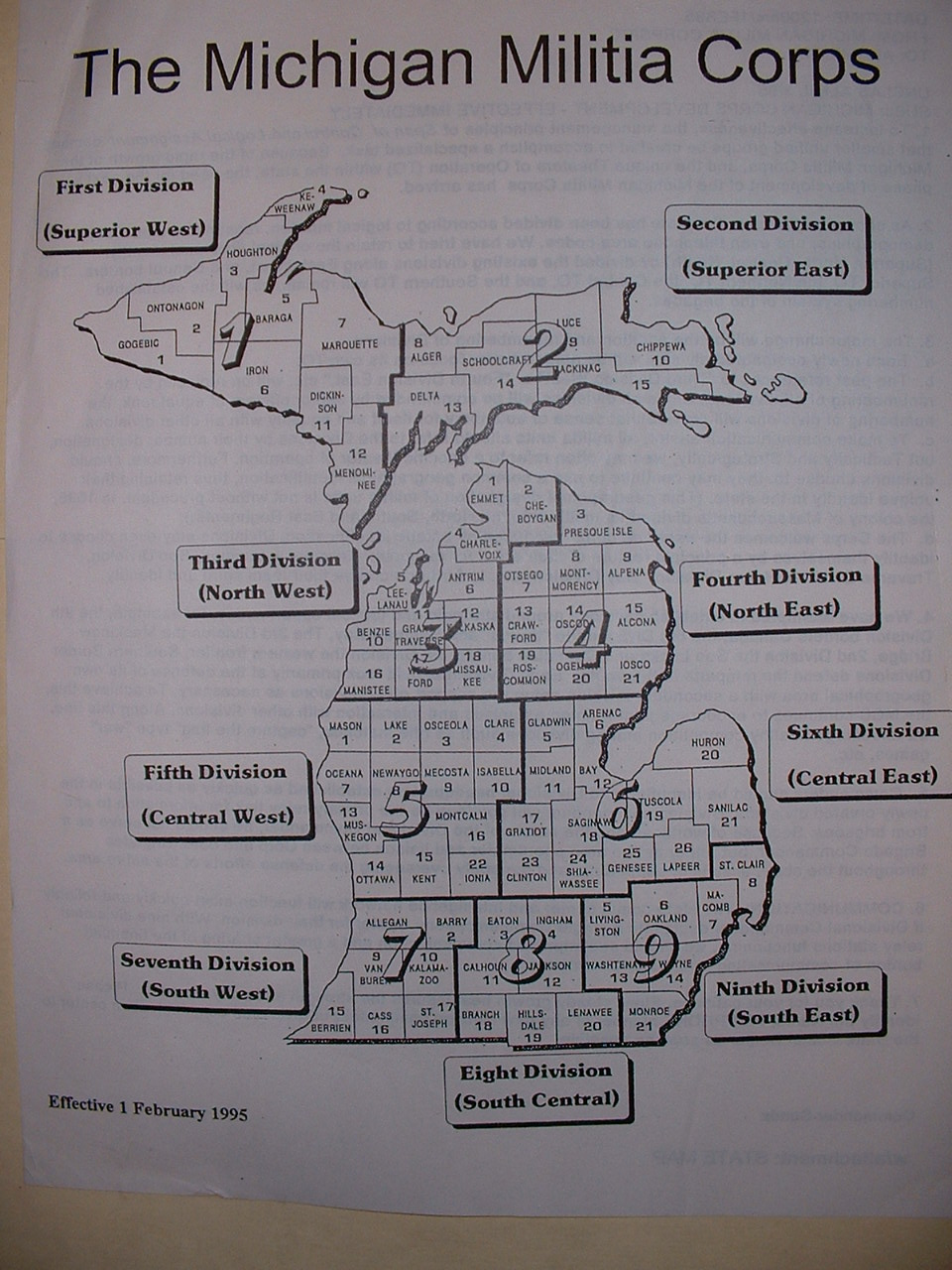
Michigan Militia divisions and brigades.

Following his resignation, Olson continued to be involved with the militia, although he increasingly criticized the group for being "too moderate". Olson sought to regain his position as the leader of the MMC, but lost in July 1995 an electoral contest against Lynn Van Huizen, a US Army veteran who saw service in Vietnam. Following this defeat, Olson founded his own militia, the Northern Michigan Regional Militia, in order to "resurrect and re-energize what the militia initially was". In response, Van Huizen distanced himself from Olson, stating that the group rejected his "radical views".

On February 15, 1998 a dissident faction challenged the leadership of Van Huizen and Tom Wayne, the Chief of Staff for the Michigan Militia, mainly due to Van Huizen and Wayne's project of expanding the powers of the state command. On March 15 the breakaway group elected Joe Pilchak, a draftsman from Genesee County, as their state commander. Van Huizen and Wayne continued to hold the constitutionalist faction of the MMC – named the Michigan Militia Wolverines – in the western part of Michigan, although Pilchak's "millennial" wing has proven stronger in the eastern part of the state. In the years that followed the Oklahoma City bombing, however, the Michigan Militia's Corps membership slowly declined.

== Views ==
Van Huizen, who served as the commander of the militia between 1996 and 1998, was considered a more moderate militia leader by the FBI's 1999 report Project Megiddo: "A number of militia leaders, such as Lynn Van Huizen of the Michigan Militia Corps – Wolverines, have gone to some effort to actively rid their ranks of radical members who are inclined to carry out acts of violence and/or terrorism."

According to scholar Mack Mariani, both Olson and Van Huizen – and leaders of the American militia movement in general – nonetheless share the view that "the American Republic is in such a deep state of crisis that average citizens must join the militia movement in order to defend themselves against an increasingly tyrannical government and out-of-control government agents." The mythology of the American Revolution is also significant among militia leaders like Olson or Wayne, who viewed themselves as the last defenders of the true principles of the revolution.

== See also ==
- Hutaree
