= United States v. Stone =

United States v. Stone may refer to:

- United States v. Stone, 39 U.S. 524 (1840)
- United States v. Stone, 69 U.S. 525 (1864), a Supreme Court case involving curtilage
- United States v. Stone, Case No. 10-20123, an E.D. Mich. criminal case against several members of the Michigan Hutaree
- United States v. Stone, Crim. Action No. 19-0018, a D.D.C. criminal case against Roger Stone
