= Louis Freeh =

Fifth Director of the FBI (born 1950)

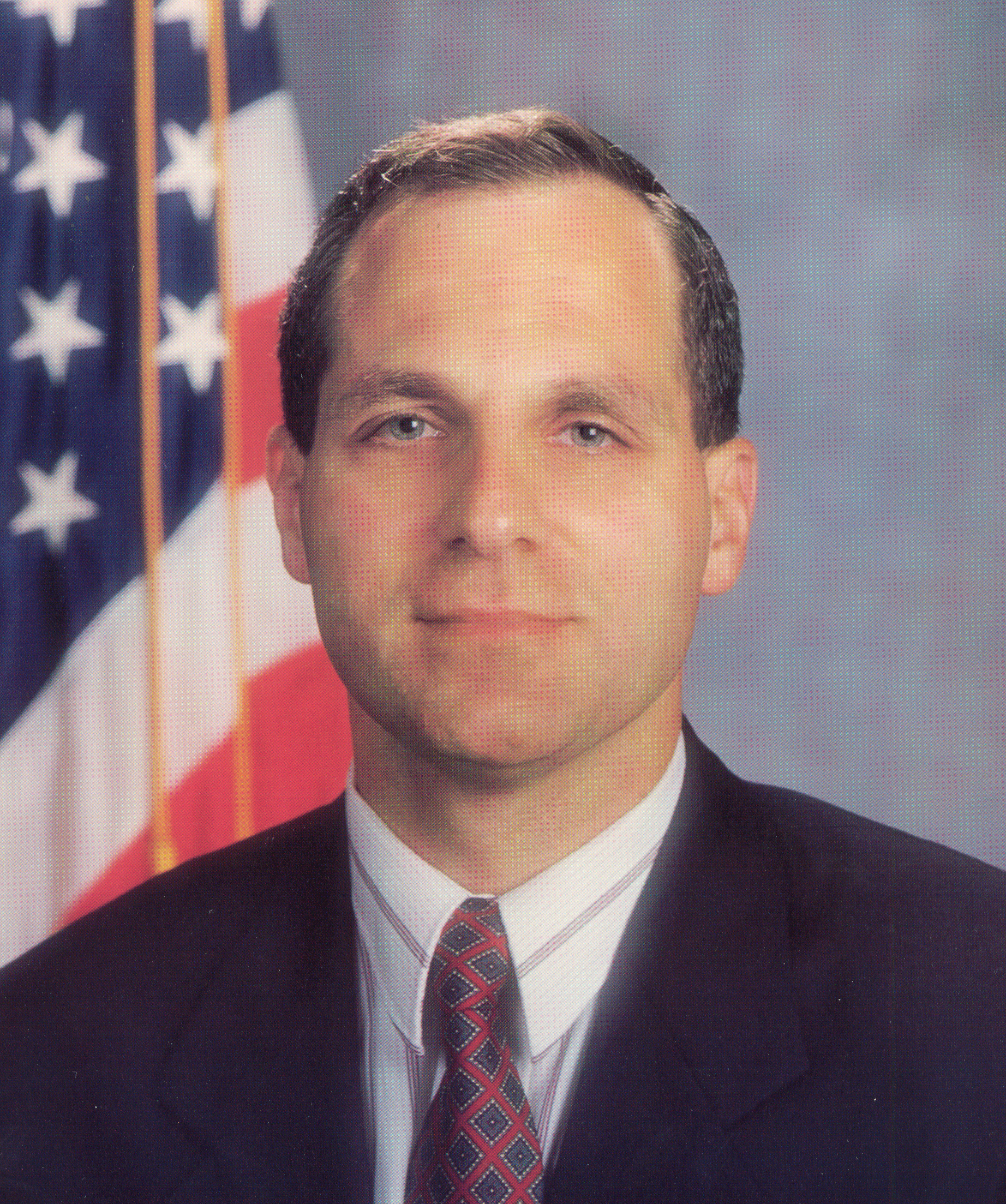

5th Director of the Federal Bureau of Investigation
- In office September 1, 1993 – June 25, 2001
- President: Bill Clinton; George W. Bush
- Deputy: David G. Binney; Larry A. Potts; Weldon L. Kennedy; William Esposito; Thomas J. Pickard
- Preceded by: Floyd I. Clarke (acting)
- Succeeded by: Thomas J. Pickard (acting)

Judge of the United States District Court for the Southern District of New York
- In office May 30, 1991 – August 31, 1993
- Appointed by: George H. W. Bush
- Preceded by: Richard J. Daronco
- Succeeded by: Shira Scheindlin

Personal details
- Born: Louis Joseph Freeh; January 6, 1950 (age 76) Jersey City, New Jersey, U.S.
- Party: Republican
- Spouse: Marilyn Coyle (m. 1983)
- Children: 6
- Education: Rutgers University, New Brunswick (BA); Rutgers University, Newark (JD); New York University (LLM)

Louis Joseph Freeh (born January 6, 1950) is an American attorney and former judge who served as the fifth director of the Federal Bureau of Investigation from September 1993 to June 2001.

Graduated from Rutgers University and New York University School of Law, Freeh began his career as a special agent in the FBI, and was later an Assistant United States Attorney and United States district judge for the United States District Court for the Southern District of New York. A Republican, he was appointed as FBI director by President Bill Clinton. He is now a lawyer and consultant in the private sector.

== Early life and career ==
Freeh was born January 6, 1950, in Jersey City, New Jersey, the son of an Italian-American mother named Bernice (née Chinchiolo), a bookkeeper, and a German-American father named William Freeh Sr., a real estate broker. Freeh, a native of North Bergen, graduated from Saint Joseph of the Palisades High School in West New York, New Jersey in 1967. He then graduated Phi Beta Kappa from Rutgers University–New Brunswick with a Bachelor of Arts degree in 1971, and received a Juris Doctor degree from Rutgers School of Law–Newark in 1974 and a Master of Laws degree in criminal law from New York University School of Law in 1984.

Freeh was an FBI Special Agent from 1975 to 1981 in the New York City field office and at FBI Headquarters in Washington, D.C. In 1981, he joined the U.S. Attorney's Office for the Southern District of New York as an Assistant United States Attorney. Subsequently, he held positions there as Chief of the Organized Crime Unit, Deputy United States Attorney, and Associate United States Attorney. He was also a first lieutenant in the United States Army Reserve.

As a youth, Freeh became an Eagle Scout in 1963 and in 1995 was awarded the Distinguished Eagle Scout Award by the Boy Scouts of America.

=== "Pizza Connection" case ===
A notable case Freeh was associated with was the "Pizza Connection" investigation, in which he was lead prosecutor. The case, prosecuted in the mid-1980s, involved a drug trafficking operation in the United States by Sicilian organized crime members who used pizza parlors as fronts. After a 16-month trial, 17 of 19 defendants were convicted, of which 16 were sentenced. The "Pizza Connection" case was, at the time, the most complex criminal investigation ever undertaken by the U.S. government.

=== Walter Moody trial ===
Another notable case Freeh was associated with was the murder trial of Walter Moody, accused of the pipe bomb assassination of federal judge Robert Smith Vance in Birmingham, Alabama and attorney Robert E. Robinson in Savannah, Georgia. Freeh was appointed Special Prosecutor in the case alongside Howard Shapiro.

Vance was assassinated on December 16, 1989, at his home in Mountain Brook, Alabama, when he opened a package containing a mail bomb sent by serial bomber Walter Moody. Vance was killed instantly; his wife Helen was seriously injured. Moody had mistakenly thought Judge Vance had denied his appeal of another case.

The Department of Justice charged Moody with the murders of Judge Vance and of Robinson, a black civil-rights attorney who had been killed in a separate explosion at his office. "Roy" Moody was also charged with mailing bombs that were defused at the Eleventh Circuit's headquarters in Atlanta and at the Jacksonville office of the National Association for the Advancement of Colored People (NAACP).

In 1991, Moody was sentenced to seven federal life terms, plus 400 years. He was subsequently tried by the state in 1996 for the murders and was executed by the state of Alabama in 2018 when he was 83 years old.

== Federal judicial service ==
Freeh was nominated by President George H. W. Bush on April 9, 1991, to a seat on the United States District Court for the Southern District of New York vacated by Judge Richard J. Daronco. He was confirmed by the United States Senate on May 24, 1991, and received his commission on May 30, 1991. His service terminated on August 31, 1993, when he resigned to direct the FBI.

== Director of the Federal Bureau of Investigation (1993–2001) ==
Shortly before and during Freeh's tenure, the FBI was involved in a number of high-profile incidents and internal investigations. In 2011, Reuters wrote that Freeh "faced widespread criticism for a series of high-profile blunders" during his tenure as FBI Director.

=== Civil liberties ===
Among other Justice Department officials (including Attorney General Reno), Freeh was named a co-defendant in Zieper v. Metzinger, a 1999 federal court case. The American Civil Liberties Union assisted the plaintiffs who sued due to the FBI's conduct in investigating "Military Takeover of New York City", a short (fictional) film made in October 1999 that discussed riots and a military takeover of Times Square on New Year's Eve, 1999.

In May 2000, he reached an agreement with Rep. José Serrano, then Puerto Rican Independence Party Senator Manuel Rodríguez Orellana, and then Puerto Rico Senate Committee on Federal Affairs chairman Kenneth McClintock to release FBI files on Puerto Rican political activists. More than 185,000 pages were released and catalogued by the Office of Legislative Services of Puerto Rico.

In testimony to the Senate Judiciary Committee, Freeh said that the widespread use of effective encryption "is one of the most difficult problems for law enforcement as the next century approaches". He considered the loss of wiretapping to law enforcement (as a result of encryption) to be dangerous and said that the "country [would] be unable to protect itself" against terrorism and serious crimes.

=== Ruby Ridge ===
An investigation of the August 1992 incident at Ruby Ridge, Idaho, in which an FBI sharpshooter killed the wife of Randy Weaver, was ongoing when Freeh joined the FBI as its director. An FBI unit, the Hostage Rescue Team, was present at the incident; Freeh later said that had he been director, he would not have involved the HRT. FBI sniper Lon Horiuchi was later charged with manslaughter; Freeh said that he was "deeply disappointed" at the charges, filed by a county prosecutor and later dropped.

Freeh was not censured for alleged managerial failures in the investigation of the incident, although a Justice Department inquiry had made such a recommendation.

=== Waco ===
An investigation of the events of April 19, 1993, when Bureau of Alcohol, Tobacco, and Firearms (ATF) special agents served a warrant on the Branch Davidian compound at Waco, Texas, was ongoing during Freeh's tenure. While the event had taken place before he became Director, a highly controversial investigation ensued during Freeh's tenure, similar to the Ruby Ridge situation, which had also preceded Freeh's time at the FBI. There were allegations of a cover-up by the FBI in the Waco investigation, which led to tensions developing between Freeh and Janet Reno, then-Attorney General. Reno, who had herself been blamed for mishandling of the confrontation and investigation at Waco, sent United States Marshals to FBI headquarters to seize Waco-related evidence. Freeh took a neutral position during the investigations to distance himself from the tide of criticism.

=== Khobar Towers bombing ===
Shortly before 10 a.m. on June 25, 1996, members of a terrorist group detonated a truck bomb outside building 131 (also known as Khobar Towers) of the King Abdul Aziz Air Base in Saudi Arabia. The building was almost exclusively occupied by members of the US Air Force, who were there to patrol the southern Iraqi no-fly zone enacted after the Gulf War.

In the attack, 19 US military personnel and a Saudi local were killed and 372 wounded, making it the deadliest terrorist attack on Americans abroad since the 1983 Beirut barracks bombing.

Freeh said in his book My FBI that he felt the deepest sadness about the Khobar Towers investigation. It was not until his last day in office, June 21, 2001, that a federal grand jury in Alexandria, Virginia returned a 46-count indictment against 14 defendants charged with the Khobar Towers attack. The indictments came just before some of the counts would have expired due to a five-year statute of limitations. In his book, Freeh maintains that he was obstructed by the Clinton Administration for political reasons in investigating the bombing and bringing the terrorists to justice.

=== TWA Flight 800 ===
On July 17, 1996, TWA Flight 800 exploded and crashed into the Atlantic Ocean, killing all 230 persons on board. The following day, the FBI commenced a parallel investigation in spite of the National Transportation Safety Board having "priority over any investigation by another department, agency, or instrumentality of the United States Government", as stated in 49 U.S.C. § 1131.

Subsequently, FBI agents blocked attempts by the NTSB to interview witnesses, according to a copy of a safety board report obtained by Aviation Week & Space Technology. One month after the explosion, chemists at the FBI crime laboratory in Washington found traces of PETN, an explosive component of bombs and surface-to-air missiles. Nevertheless, on November 18, 1997, the FBI closed its investigation by announcing that "no evidence has been found which would indicate that a criminal act was the cause of the tragedy of TWA flight 800."

Almost three years later, in August 2000, the NTSB published its final report which stated that "the probable cause of the TWA flight 800 accident was an explosion of the center wing fuel tank (CWT), resulting from ignition of the flammable fuel/air mixture in the tank."

=== Centennial Olympic Park bombing ===
The U.S. Senate Subcommittee on Terrorism, Technology and Government Information heard testimony from Freeh regarding the leaking of Richard Jewell's name to the media in connection with the bombing at the 1996 Olympic Games. Freeh testified that he did not know how the name of Jewell, who had been falsely accused in the bombings, had been leaked to the media; CNN reported that Freeh had lied under oath.

=== Montana Freemen ===
In March 1996, Freeh and the FBI were praised for the handling of the 81-day standoff between law enforcement agents and the Montana Freemen, a fringe political group. Director Abraham Foxman of the Anti-Defamation League, which had issued reports critical of the Freemen and encouraged their prosecution, commended the "peaceful conclusion" to the standoff.

=== Unabomber ===
Theodore Kaczynski, the "Unabomber," was apprehended in 1996 after his manifesto, Industrial Society and its Future, was published in the New York Times and Washington Post. Freeh and Attorney General Reno recommended publication, acceding to Kaczynski's offer to "renounce terrorism" if it was published. A tip from the bomber's brother David, who recognized the writing style, assisted the FBI in his capture.

=== Robert Hanssen ===
Robert Hanssen, a 25-year veteran of the FBI, was arrested in 2001 and charged with spying for the Soviet Union and Russia, beginning in 1985. Hanssen had attended Catholic Mass at the same church as Freeh. Freeh called the security breach "exceptionally grave" and appointed a panel, led by former FBI and Central Intelligence Agency head William Webster, to review the damage done by Hanssen's espionage.

=== Wen Ho Lee ===
In 1999, Los Alamos National Laboratory scientist Wen Ho Lee was fired from his job, arrested, and held in solitary confinement without trial for 278 days while his handling of sensitive nuclear information was investigated. Freeh accused him of downloading a "portable, personal trove" of US nuclear secrets.

According to Lee's book, the FBI quickly figured out that the information which had improperly been passed on had not been available to Lee, as the design data the PRC had obtained could not have come from Los Alamos since it related to information that would only have been available to a "downstream" contractor, i.e. someone involved in the final warhead production process, and this information was only created after the weapon design left the Los Alamos lab where Lee had been employed.

Ultimately, Lee pled guilty to one of the fifty-nine counts brought against him, after which he was freed from prison. At Lee's sentencing hearing, District Judge James A. Parker scolded the US government for its treatment of Lee, saying that the top decision makers in the case "have embarrassed this entire nation and each of us who is a citizen of it" and that they had been "led astray" by US government officials.

Parker apologized to Lee, saying, "Dr. Lee, you were terribly wronged by being held in pretrial custody in demeaning and unnecessarily punitive conditions. I am truly sorry."

A Justice Department report of the investigation of Lee said that Freeh was not fully informed about the investigation until over a year after it began, and that the FBI as a whole "bungled" the case.

=== Chinese political and campaign fundraising controversies ===
In February 1997, the media announced that Freeh personally blocked the sharing of intelligence information regarding China's alleged plot to influence US elections with the White House. Some members of Congress were reportedly warned.

The following month, Freeh testified before Congress that his investigation into campaign finance irregularities of the 1996 U.S. presidential and Congressional campaigns was not focusing on individual criminal acts, but on a possible conspiracy involving China.

Later that year, Freeh wrote a memorandum to Attorney General Janet Reno calling for an Independent Counsel to investigate the fundraising scandal. In his memo he wrote: "It is difficult to imagine a more compelling situation for appointing an Independent Counsel". Reno rejected his request.

=== Other cases ===
Other cases handled by the FBI during Freeh's tenure included the death of White House counsel Vince Foster (in 1993), allegations of incompetence at the FBI crime laboratory, investigation of the Oklahoma City bombing (1995) and the capture and prosecution of Timothy McVeigh.

=== Criticism ===
In 2000, the editorial staff of Business Week called for the resignation of Freeh, citing the Carnivore communications-monitoring system, the alleged Waco cover-up, and insubordination to Attorney General Reno as reasons.

Freeh was accused of malpractice several times during his time at the FBI. In the case of the Oklahoma City bombing, Freeh failed to hand over 3,000 pages of evidence to Timothy McVeigh's lawyers. Freeh also received backlash for not looking into whether Moscow had recruited someone in the FBI, despite being warned by senior investigator Thomas Kimmel. It would later come out that Robert Hanssen had been recruited by the Russians to be a spy for them. In 1994 after it was discovered that Aldrich Ames was a spy for the Russians, Freeh was advised to require routine polygraph tests for FBI agents; no action was taken by him.

In 1997 FBI agent Frederic Whitehurst was suspended by Freeh not long after making allegations that FBI lab techniques resulted in contaminated evidence. Just days after Whitehurst was put on administrative leave, a report was delivered to the FBI that supported Whitehurst's claims that evidence in cases may have been contaminated. On March 5, Freeh was called before Congress, where he said that he suspended Whitehurst on recommendations from Inspector general Michael Bromwich. But Bromwich said that he never made such a recommendation. Freeh admitted that his testimony was incomplete, but denied he deliberately misled Congress. Whitehurst would later accuse Freeh of covering up mistakes made by forensic analysts.

Attorney general Janet Reno testified that information that could have prevented the September 11 attacks was mishandled by the FBI at the time Freeh was the director of the FBI.

=== Resignation ===
In June 2001, he resigned amid criticism that the FBI needed stronger leadership, particularly after allegations of spying by Robert Hanssen. Upon his resignation, he was praised by Attorney General John Ashcroft, who called him "a model law enforcement officer". He was replaced by Thomas J. Pickard, who served as acting FBI Director for 71 days until being replaced by Robert Mueller.

== Post-FBI career ==
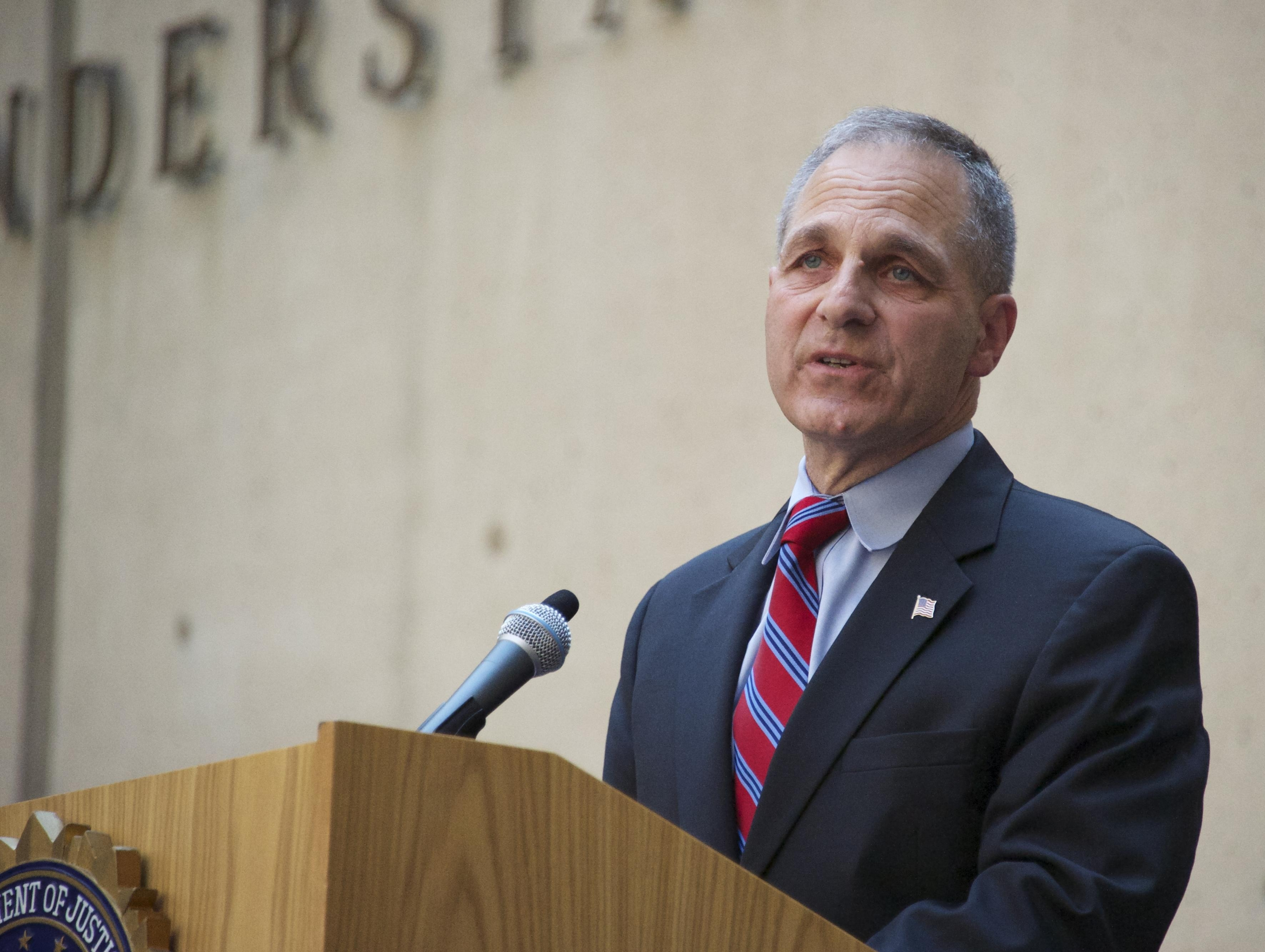
Freeh speaks at the farewell ceremony of outgoing Director Robert Mueller in 2013

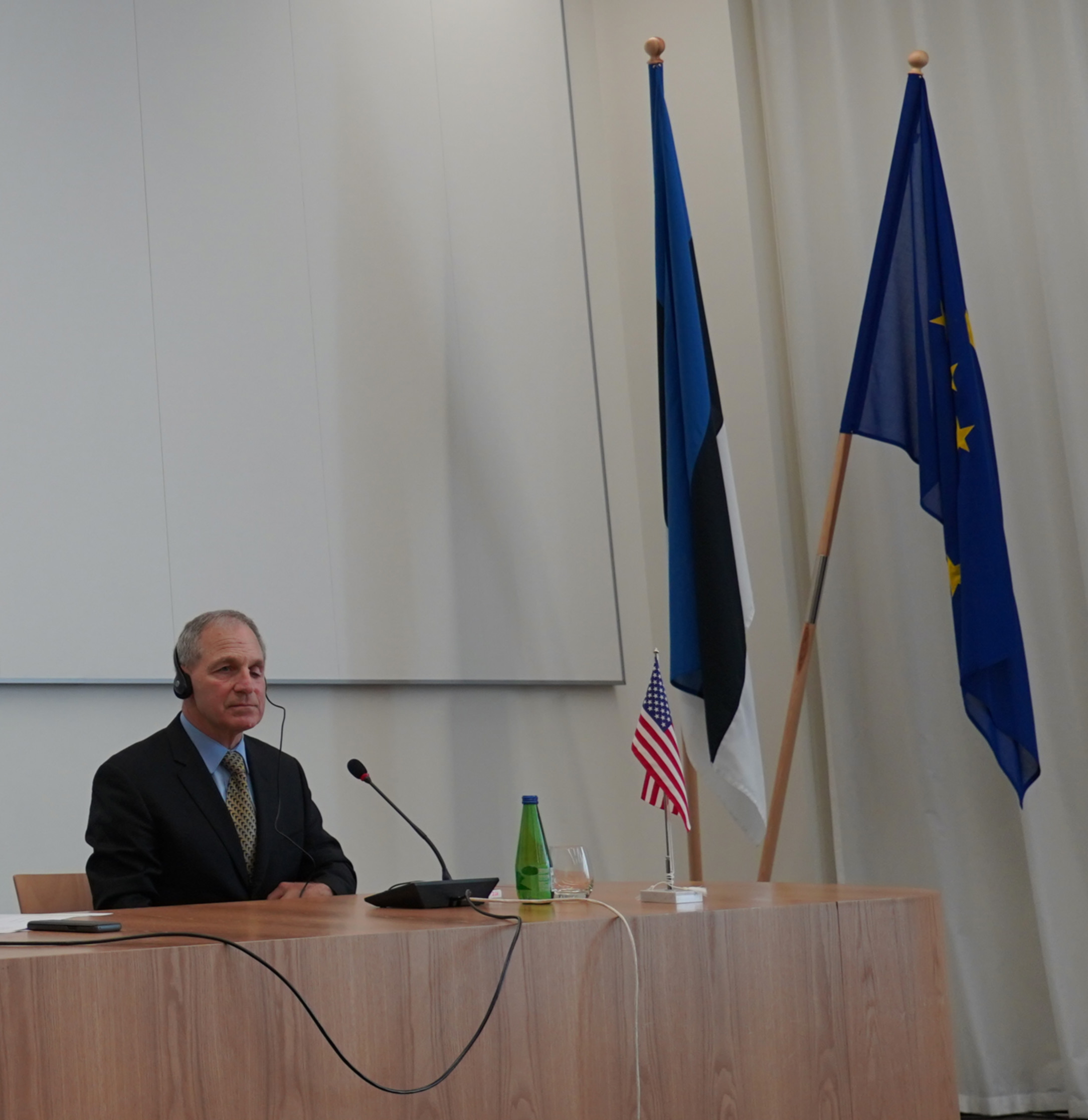
Former FBI Director Louis J. Freeh at a press conference in the Estonian Ministry of Finance, Tallinn, 3 July 2020.

Freeh approached acting New Jersey Governor Donald DiFrancesco, and offered to serve, without salary, as the state's anti-terrorism "czar". Di Francesco approached both major-party candidates for governor to secure their approval; Bret Schundler, the Republican candidate, agreed "in principle". However, Democrat Jim McGreevey, who won the gubernatorial election, turned down Freeh in favor of Golan Cipel. It was later discovered that McGreevey and Cipel had been involved in a sexual relationship. McGreevey was heavily criticized for giving the post to Cipel rather than Freeh or another experienced individual.

In September 2001, Freeh was appointed to the board of directors of credit card issuer MBNA; he also served as the bank's general counsel, as well as corporate secretary and ethics officer. Likewise, Bristol-Myers Squibb elected him to its board of directors.

Freeh is also a member of the board of consultants of the Gavel Consulting Group, formed by current and former federal judges and high-ranking government officials to provide advice and counseling to the private sector.

Beginning in 2004 Freeh began teaching as an adjunct law professor for Widener University School of Law. Drawing on his years of experience, he has taught White Collar Crime.

In 2007, Freeh formed Freeh Group International Solutions, a consulting and investigative firm headquartered in Wilmington, Delaware with regional offices in Washington, D.C., and New York. Affiliated firms include Freeh Group Europe and the law firm Freeh, Sporkin & Sullivan, LLP. The latter firm includes Eugene R. Sullivan, a retired federal judge in Washington, D.C., and Eugene R. Sullivan II amongst partners, and Stanley Sporkin as senior counsel. Sporkin is a retired federal judge who earlier served as head of the Securities and Exchange Commission's Division of Enforcement and as general counsel to the Central Intelligence Agency.

=== Nasser Kazeminy ===
Freeh was hired by Nasser Kazeminy to conduct an independent investigation into alleged financial improprieties in the relationship between Kazeminy and former Senator Norm Coleman that surfaced during the final week of the 2008 Minnesota Senate race. At the time, Freeh was serving on the board of the National Ethnic Coalition of Organizations (NECO), whose chairman was Kazeminy. Although Coleman had received roughly $100,000 in gifts from Kazeminy over the years, Freeh's investigation cleared both Coleman and Kazeminy of any wrongdoing in 2011. The Intercept, questioning Freeh's impartiality, reported that nine days after Freeh's investigation cleared Kazeminy of wrongdoing, Freeh's wife received a one half ownership stake from Kazeminy in a Palm Beach property valued at $3 million.

In 2009, Louis Freeh was hired by Saudi Arabian Prince Bandar bin Sultan as his legal representative on issues surrounding the Al-Yamamah arms deal, appearing April 7, 2009, on the PBS series Frontline's episode "Black Money".

In late May 2011, Freeh was retained as an independent investigator by the FIFA Ethics Committee in the bribery scandal centering on Mohammed bin Hammam and Jack Warner. However, the Court of Arbitration of Sports subsequently rejected Freeh's report as consisting of little more than speculation.

=== Jerry Sandusky ===
In November 2011, Pennsylvania State University announced that Freeh would lead an internal investigation into the Penn State child sex abuse scandal involving Jerry Sandusky and several high-ranking university officials. He announced that the team assisting him in his investigation would include former FBI agents and federal prosecutors. As the Sandusky trial proceeded toward conviction in June 2012, the university said Freeh would report in the summer and the report would "be released to the trustees and the public simultaneously without being reviewed by the school's general counsel's office". The report was released on July 12, 2012. The 267-page report from Freeh's law firm was characterized as deeply critical of the administration of former university president Graham Spanier, athletic director Tim Curley, late coach Joe Paterno and former university vice president Gary Schultz. A commentary at Sports Illustrated's website characterized the report's accusations against Paterno as "damning and sweeping" and the findings about Spanier, including a 2001 e-mail in the wake of the 2001 shower incident purportedly witnessed by graduate assistant Mike McQueary, as "most damning". A number of sources have questioned if not outright disputed the accuracy of Freeh's findings, pointing to the lack of hard evidence to support his "reasonable conclusions". A year after the report's issuance, the chairman of the Penn State Board of Trustees, which had originally commissioned the report, said that Freeh's conclusions amounted to "speculation". In a January 2015 interview with the Associated Press, Penn State President Eric Barron said, "I have to say, I'm not a fan of the report. There's no doubt in my mind, Freeh steered everything as if he were a prosecutor trying to convince a court to take the case."

On February 10, 2013, a report authored by former United States Attorney General and former Governor of Pennsylvania Dick Thornburgh, whom the Paterno family retained to conduct its own investigation, concluded that the Freeh report was "seriously flawed, both with respect to the process of [its] investigation and its findings related to Mr. Paterno". As of 2015 Graham Spanier is suing Freeh for defamation and tortious interference and Penn State University for breach of contract.

The Freeh Report had far-reaching outcomes for Penn State. The NCAA used the Freeh Report in lieu of its own investigation to impose sanctions on the Penn State football program. On July 23, 2012, the NCAA imposed a $60 million fine, four-year postseason ban, scholarship reductions, and vacated all victories from 1998 to 2011. These sanctions were considered to be among the most severe ever imposed on an NCAA member school. NCAA President Mark Emmert stated that the sanctions were levied "not to be just punitive, but to make sure the university establishes an athletic culture and daily mindset in which football will never again be placed ahead of educating, nurturing and protecting young people." The Big Ten Conference subsequently imposed an additional $13 million fine.

An investigation led by former U.S. Attorney General Richard Thornburgh, who was retained by the Paterno family to review the Freeh report, concluded that the report that placed so much blame on Penn State and Paterno was a "rush to injustice" that could not be relied upon. In January 2013, state senator Jake Corman and state treasurer Rob McCord launched a lawsuit against the NCAA to overturn the sanctions on Penn State on the basis that Freeh had been actively collaborating with the NCAA and that due process had not been followed. In November 2014, state senator Corman released emails showing "regular and substantive" contact between NCAA officials and Freeh's investigators, suggesting that the Freeh conclusions were orchestrated. As part of the settlement, the NCAA reversed its decision on January 16, 2015, and restored the 111 wins to Paterno's record.

=== Lobbying ===
In August 2018, Freeh hired attorney Rudy Giuliani to lobby the Romanian government calling for amnesty for Freeh's clients in a corruption probe.

In 2019 Freeh and his friend Alan Dershowitz lobbied the U.S. government of behalf of Israeli billionaire Dan Gertler. Gertler was accused of corruption by the U.S. government and was facing sanctions by the Trump administration for his business deals with the Dominican Republic. In the last days of Trump's presidency, the sanctions were lifted. The sanctions were reinstated by the Biden administration on 8 March 2021. It was reported in October 2023 that the US was considering dropping sanctions against Gertler.

=== Other ===
In November 2011, Freeh was named trustee for the MF Global bankruptcy case, the largest Wall Street bankruptcy since Lehman Brothers' in September 2008. He was appointed by U.S. Trustee Tracy Hope Davis working under the authority of U.S. Bankruptcy Court Judge Martin Glenn.

On February 5, 2013, Freeh was named Chair of the law firm Pepper Hamilton LLP. He resigned the chairmanship earlier than slated, in October 2014.

=== Book and editorials ===
An editorial by Freeh critical of the 9/11 Commission appeared in the November 17, 2005, edition of The Wall Street Journal.

In 2005, Freeh (with Howard Means) published a book about his career in the FBI entitled My FBI: Bringing Down the Mafia, Investigating Bill Clinton, and Fighting the War on Terror. It is highly critical of both President Clinton and former counter-terrorism advisor Richard A. Clarke. On October 19, 2005, Freeh made an appearance on The Daily Show to promote the book. A New York Times review called it "A strangely shallow offering by a man who is anything but...".

== Personal life ==
In 1980, Freeh began dating Marilyn Coyle, then a paralegal in the FBI's civil rights division. They married in 1983 and had six children. Freeh is a devout Roman Catholic. Contrary to rumors, he is not a member of the Opus Dei prelature. According to The Bureau and the Mole, a book by David A. Vise, one of Freeh's sons was enrolled at The Heights School in Potomac, Maryland, which Vise describes as "an Opus Dei academy". Several of his sons graduated from Archmere Academy, a Catholic school in Claymont, Delaware. One of his sons attended Georgetown University, a Jesuit university in Washington, D.C.

Freeh acquired Italian citizenship on October 23, 2009.

=== SUV crash and hospitalization ===
Shortly after noon on August 25, 2014, Freeh was headed south on Vermont 12, in his 2010 GMC Yukon, when he drove off the east side of the road. The vehicle struck a mailbox at 2762 Vermont 12, Barnard, Vermont, and a row of shrubs, before stopping against a tree, police said. Freeh told police he fell asleep at the wheel. He was flown from Barnard to Dartmouth-Hitchcock Medical Center in Lebanon, New Hampshire, where he was admitted under armed guard.

== See also ==
- Project Megiddo

Legal offices
| Preceded by Richard J. Daronco | Judge of the United States District Court for the Southern District of New York; 1991–1993 | Succeeded by Shira Scheindlin |
Government offices
| Preceded by Floyd I. Clarke; Acting | Director of the Federal Bureau of Investigation; 1993–2001 | Succeeded by Thomas J. Pickard; Acting |
