= Danahy =

Danahy is a surname. Notable people with the surname include:

- Paul Danahy (1928–2022), American politician and judge
- Pat Danahy (born 1985), American rugby union player

== See also ==
- 20312 Danahy, a main-belt asteroid
- Dennehy
