= Project Megiddo =

FBI counterterrorism report

- Author: Federal Bureau of Investigation
- Subject: Terrorism
- Publication date: 1999
- Media type: Digital
- Pages: 32

Project Megiddo was a report researched and written by the United States' Federal Bureau of Investigation under Director Louis Freeh. Released on October 20, 1999, the report named followers of white supremacy, Christian Identity, the American militia movement, Black Hebrew Israelites, and apocalyptic cults as potential terrorists who might become violent in reaction to the new millennium.

== Introduction ==
The report began:

For over four thousand years, MEGIDDO, a hill in northern Israel, has been the site of many battles. Ancient cities were established there to serve as a fortress on the plain of Jezreel to guard a mountain pass. As Megiddo was built and rebuilt, one city upon the other, a mound or hill was formed. The Hebrew word "Armageddon" means "hill of Megiddo." In English, the word has come to represent battle itself. The last book in the New Testament of the Bible designates Armageddon as the assembly point in the apocalyptic setting of God's final and conclusive battle against evil. The name "Megiddo" is an apt title for a project that analyzes those who believe the year 2000 will usher in the end of the world and who are willing to perpetrate acts of violence to bring that end about.

== Purpose ==
The report's purpose was to warn other domestic law enforcement agencies to "the potential for extremist criminal activity in the United States by individuals or domestic groups who attach special significance to the year 2000." The report also stated: "The threat posed by extremists as a result of perceived events associated with the Year 2000 is very real. The volatile mix of apocalyptic religious and (New World Order) conspiracy theories may produce violent acts aimed at precipitating the end of the world as prophesied in the Bible."

The groups named as "potentially violent" were "biblically-driven cults," "militias, adherents of racist belief systems such as Christian Identity and Wotanism, and other radical domestic extremists." The report ends by discussing the possibility of terrorist attacks in the city of Jerusalem, saying, "The extreme terrorist fringes of Christianity, Judaism, and Islam are all present in the United States. Thus, millennial violence in Jerusalem could conceivably lead to violence in the United States as well."

== Reception ==
Insight on the News commented, "In a polemic presented as a threat report, the FBI has targeted religious groups and rightwing eccentrics as potential terrorists likely to go postal as the new millennium arrives ... Even at the height of the Cold War during the 1970s and 1980s the FBI was not allowed to pursue openly declared revolutionary Marxists in this way, being required by the courts to show cause by establishing an actual attempt to commit illegal acts."

The American Civil Liberties Union cited Project Megiddo in its defense of filmmaker Mike Zieper, whose film about a military takeover of Times Square was removed from the Internet due to FBI pressure. On November 10, 1999, the International Asatru-Odinic Alliance accused the FBI of violating its First Amendment rights to freedom of religion, free speech, and peaceful assembly. The reason given for this accusation was the propagation of "numerous false statements and innuendos" about Odinism in the Project Megiddo report.

== Aftermath ==
On January 6, 2000, U.S. Attorney General Janet Reno said in response to a question at a news conference asking why the terrorist acts predicted in the report did not happen:

I think that speculation as to why it didn't—it—the nice answer would be that there was no threat. What we must all do, I think, is make sure that we pursue situations, consistent with the law, consistent with due process; that we take reasonable precautions; that we—when we have specific information that can inform the American people, that we advise them; and that America proceed in the way it has always proceeded, that it won't back down, that it won't be intimidated, that it will take reasonable precautions, and that we will see our laws honored.

== See also ==
- 2000 millennium attack plots
