= Norman Olson =

American militia movement activist

Norman Olson (born 1946) is an American militia movement activist and the co-founder of the Michigan Militia. Olson is a Baptist minister and retired United States Air Force non-commissioned officer originally from Alanson, Michigan.

== Biography ==
In 1994, Olson and Ray Southwell founded the Michigan Militia, an organized militia group established in response to perceived threats on the rights of citizens by the federal government, specifically what they perceived was then-President Bill Clinton's desire to pass strict gun control laws. Olson owned a 120-acre (0.49 km^{2}) wooded property in Northern Michigan which served as the militia's training base, where members learned paramilitary skills.

Olson drew the attention of the U.S. government to himself and the Michigan Militia when he reported that Oklahoma City bombing accomplice Terry Nichols had attended one of his meetings. He also claimed that the bombing was carried out by the government of Japan in retaliation for a sarin gas attack on the Tokyo subway, which Olson claimed was perpetrated by the United States. The conspiracy theory was deemed so extreme by fellow militiamen that he was expelled from the Michigan Militia after losing four elections for commander.

Also in 1995, Olson testified about the militia movement to the United States Senate Judiciary Subcommittee on Terrorism, Technology and Homeland Security.

In 2000, Olson ordered militias across the United States to defend the Indianapolis Baptist Temple, whose property was to be seized after multiple failures to pay taxes. He ordered militias to surround the church to prevent the government from entering, and claimed the incident could be "Waco II".

In 2004, Olson purchased 22 acres (89,000 m^{2}) near Nikiski, Alaska, on the Kenai Peninsula, where he and Southwell moved with their families. He organized the Alaska Citizens Militia. He ran for lieutenant governor with the Alaskan Independence Party's nomination, but withdrew from the election.
