= Dennehy =

Dennehy is a surname of Irish origin. The original form in Irish is Ó Duineachdha, meaning descendant of Duineachaidh, who was a chieftain who fought the Danes in Limerick in 934. The name may mean "humane". Spelling variations include Denehy, Dennehey, Denehey, Danahy, Deniehy, and Denahy.

== Persons with this surname ==
The name may refer to:

- Billy Dennehy (born 1987), Irish football player
- Brian Dennehy (1938–2020), American actor
- Daniel Deniehy (1828–1865), Australian writer and politician
- Darren Dennehy (born 1988), Irish football player
- Donnacha Dennehy (born 1970), Irish composer
- Elizabeth Dennehy (born 1960), American actress
- James Dennehy, American law enforcement officer
- Joanna Dennehy, serial killer; see Peterborough ditch murders
- John Dennehy (born 1940), Irish politician
- Miah Dennehy (born 1950), Irish football player
- Mick Dennehy (born 1950), American football player and coach
- Ned Dennehy (born 1965), Irish actor
- Penelope Dennehy, virologist
- Peter Denahy (born 1972), Australian musician
- Thomas Dennehy (1829–1915), British general
- Robert Daniel Dennehy, Danahy (1968-present), American Builder and Surfer
- William Francis Dennehy (1853–1918), Irish writer
