= 2025 NBA illegal gambling prosecution =

2025 North American basketball league scandal

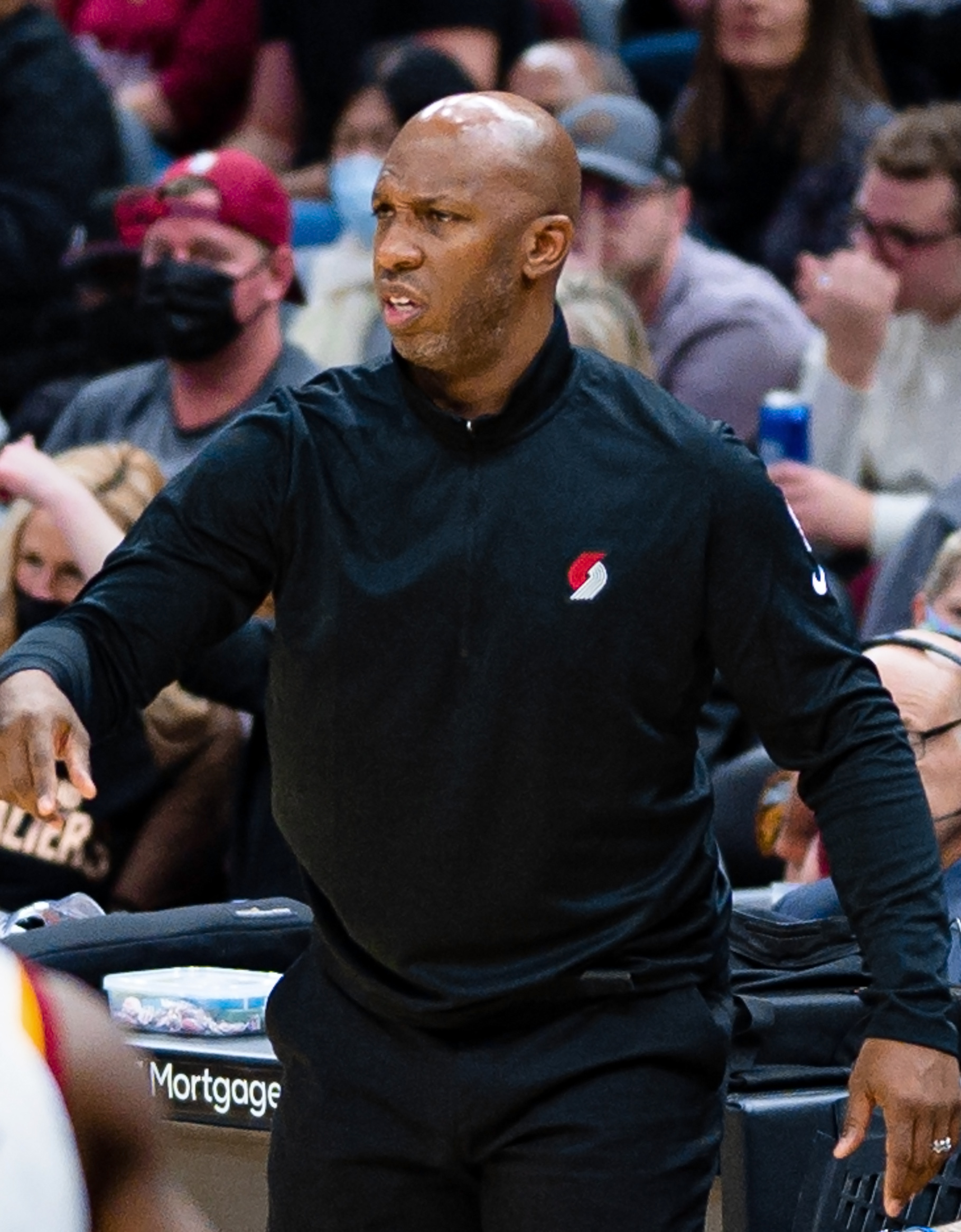
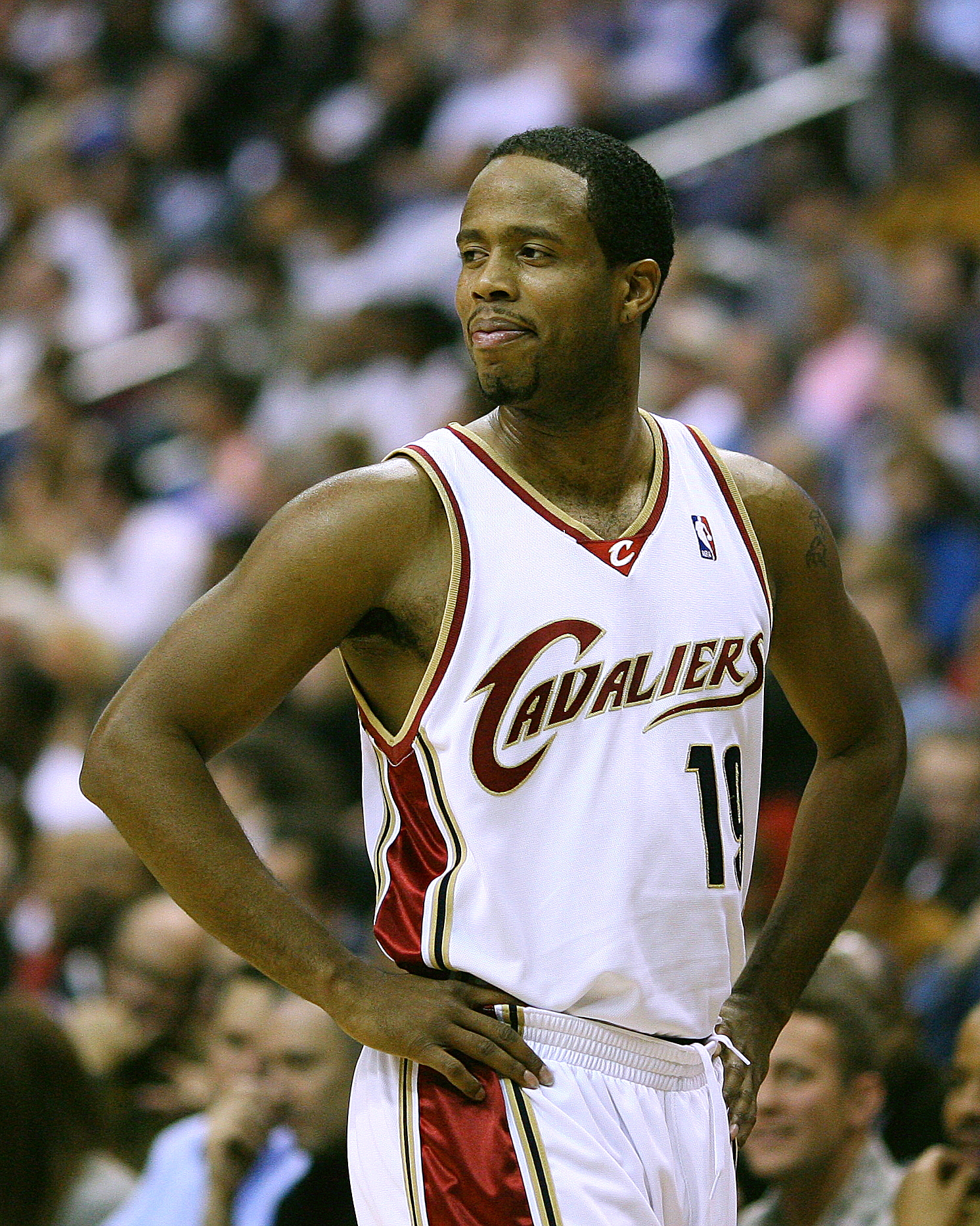
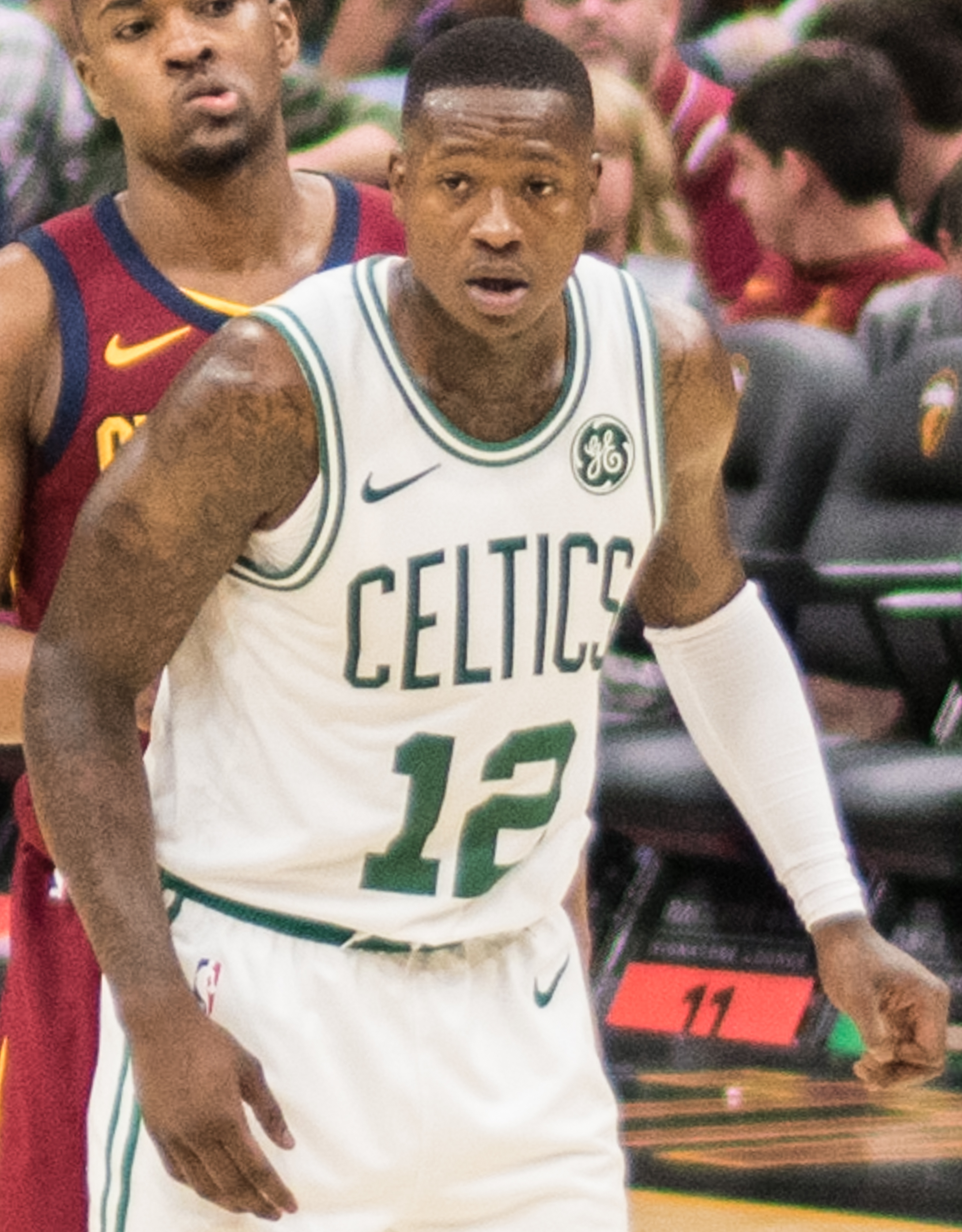
(Left to right) Portland Trail Blazers head coach Chauncey Billups, former player Damon Jones, and Terry Rozier

On October 23, 2025, current and former National Basketball Association (NBA) players and a coach were among 34 people arrested and indicted for allegedly conducting rigged sports betting and poker games. Hall of Famer and at the time Portland Trail Blazers head coach Chauncey Billups, former player Damon Jones, and former Miami Heat player Terry Rozier were all arrested for their alleged involvement in the scandal.

== Investigation ==
The Federal Bureau of Investigation and the New York City Police Department Organized Crime Control Bureau's Joint Organized Crime Task Force began investigating individuals associated with the NBA for illegal gambling in 2023. The bureau was alerted to unusual betting activity involving Rozier in March 2023. The NBA also investigated, meeting with Rozier multiple times, but ultimately cleared him. Rozier was arrested in Orlando, Florida, where the Heat played their season opener against the Orlando Magic.

On October 23, 2025, the prosecutions were made public after the arrest of the involved parties. Billups was arrested in Portland, Oregon, a day after the Trail Blazers' season-opening loss to the Minnesota Timberwolves.

Both Rozier and Billups denied the allegations and were placed on administrative leave by the NBA pending review of the federal indictments.

On May 28, 2026, the Justice Department filed a superseding indictment that accused Rozier of accepting a $100,000 bribe to alter his performance. The new charges include wire fraud conspiracy and bribery in sporting contests.

== Alleged schemes ==
The prosecution involves two alleged schemes. Billups and Rozier were charged in separate but related schemes involving rigged poker games and illegal prop bets. Billups and Jones were accused of helping the Mafia organize rigged poker games, after which the Mafia would take a portion of the winnings and go after debtors. Billups and Jones are also charged with conspiracy to commit wire fraud and money laundering.

The first indictment involved a group accused of manipulating bets on NBA games using non-public information. Prosecutors identified at least seven games between February 2023 and March 2024 under scrutiny. Rozier was alleged to have informed associates that he would leave a February 2023 game early due to injury, allowing them to place over US$200,000 in bets predicting his underperformance. He exited the game after nine minutes with a reported foot injury. Jones was also charged for his alleged role in influencing bets on two other games, and alleged to have shared privileged information about players' injuries before two Los Angeles Lakers games in 2023 and 2024. The indictment additionally accused "Co-Conspirator 8," an unnamed Oregon resident matching Billups' career timeline, of providing insider details about a Trail Blazers game in March 2023.

The second indictment charged 31 defendants, including Billups, with operating a network of rigged high-stakes poker games connected to organized crime. Prosecutors stated that members and associates of the Bonanno, Genovese, and Gambino crime families used sophisticated technology such as modified shuffling machines, contact lenses, and an X-ray table to cheat players out of approximately $7 million. Victims were reportedly lured into games with former professional athletes in locations including Las Vegas, Miami, Manhattan, and the Hamptons. Unknown to the victims, everyone surrounding them was part of the fraud: players, dealers, and even the card-shuffling and chip counting machines. If players refused to pay losses, members of the crime families allegedly used threats and intimidation to collect debts.

== Reactions ==
=== Federal government ===
New York representative Paul Tonko referred to the alleged behavior as an "inevitable consequence of the unchecked explosion of the sports betting industry."

Christopher Raia, assistant director in charge of the FBI's New York Field Office, said that this alleged illegal gambling operation defrauded innocent victims out of tens of millions of dollars and established a financial funnel for La Cosa Nostra to help cover and foster their organized criminal activity.

=== NBA and sports media ===
The arrests of Billups, Rozier, and Jones reignited discussion about gambling's longstanding presence in NBA culture. Team staff and former players described poker and bourré card games as common on team flights and in locker rooms, sometimes involving large sums of money. Analysts noted growing unease over the league’s ability to investigate betting-related matters, particularly after Rozier was previously reviewed and “not found in violation” of NBA rules in 2024. Some executives questioned public trust in the league’s internal oversight, while NBA Commissioner Adam Silver acknowledged that federal authorities had greater investigative resources. The NBA stated that it was taking the new federal indictments “with the utmost seriousness” and reaffirmed its commitment to preserving the integrity of the game.

== See also ==
- Antonio Blakeney
- Jack Molinas
- Jontay Porter
