= James B. Adams =

American politician (1926–2020)

James Adams
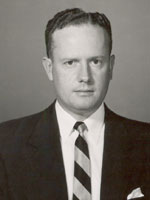

3rd and 4th Associate Director of the Federal Bureau of Investigation
- In office April 6, 1978 – May 11, 1979
- Preceded by: Himself
- Succeeded by: Floyd I. Clarke
- In office June 22, 1973 – February 5, 1978
- Preceded by: Mark Felt
- Succeeded by: Himself

Director of the Federal Bureau of Investigation
- Acting
- In office February 15, 1978 – February 23, 1978
- President: Jimmy Carter
- Preceded by: Clarence M. Kelley
- Succeeded by: William H. Webster

Member of the Texas House of Representatives
- In office January 9, 1951 – August 6, 1951
- Succeeded by: W. H. Gant

Personal details
- Born: James Blackburn Adams; December 21, 1926 Corsicana, Texas, U.S.
- Died: April 25, 2020 (aged 93) Kerrville, Texas, U.S.
- Party: Democratic
- Education: Baylor University (BA, LLB)

Military service
- Allegiance: United States
- Branch/service: United States Army
- Battles/wars: World War II

James Blackburn Adams (December 21, 1926 – April 25, 2020) was an American attorney, politician, and two-time associate director of the Federal Bureau of Investigation. Earlier in his career, he had served in the Texas House of Representatives as a member of the Democratic Party.

== Early life and education ==
James B. Adams was born in Corsicana, Texas in 1926. He served in the U.S. Army during World War II as a Japanese translator, before returning to Texas to obtain a Bachelor of Arts degree from Baylor University and a law degree from Baylor Law School.

In January 2007, Adams received the Baylor Distinguished Alumni Award.

== Career ==
After graduating from law school, Adams became a prosecuting attorney. He was elected to the Texas House of Representatives in 1950. Adams took office in 1951 as a Democrat, and resigned his seat later that year to join the Federal Bureau of Investigation. Adams was succeeded in the Texas House by W. H. Gant.

As an FBI special agent, Adams served in Seattle, San Francisco, and the Administrative Services Division. In 1959, he was appointed assistant special agent in charge of Minneapolis and in 1972 he was promoted to special agent in charge of San Antonio, Texas. In 1973, he was appointed assistant director of the Office of Planning and Evaluation and became assistant to the director/deputy associate director for investigations the following year.

In early 1977, Director of the Federal Bureau of Investigation Clarence M. Kelley announced his intention to retire. On September 30, 1977, President Jimmy Carter nominated Judge Frank Minis Johnson of the United States District Court for the Middle District of Alabama to the post. However Johnson developed severe health problems and Carter withdrew the nomination in December. Carter nominated then-judge on the United States Court of Appeals for the Eighth Circuit, William H. Webster, in January 1978. Adams served as Acting Director of the FBI from Kelley's retirement on February 15 to 23, 1978, when Webster was sworn in. Adams retired from the FBI on May 11, 1979. He then returned to Texas, where he served as Director of the Texas Department of Public Safety from 1980 to 1987.

=== Controversies ===
While Director of the Texas Department of Public Safety, Adams authorized an investigation into the District Attorney of McLennan County, Vic Feazell. Feazell had initiated an investigation into the Texas Rangers who had relied on the unreliable confessions of Henry Lee Lucas to close over 300 homicide investigations across the United States despite some confessions being clearly false. Adams authorized the investigation into Feazell as retribution for questioning the Texas Rangers, who were under Adams' authority. Following a raid of Feazell's home and office, he was charged with bribery, but eventually acquitted at trial.

== Personal life ==
Adams was married to Ione LaRae Winistorfer from September 1955 to his death on April 25, 2020, aged 93. Flags on Texas state and federal government buildings were lowered to half-staff to commemorate Adams.

Government offices
Preceded by Clarence M. Kelley	Director of the Federal Bureau of Investigation; Acting; 1978	Succeeded by William H. Webster
