= William J. Esposito =

9th Deputy Director of the Federal Bureau of Investigation
- In office February 28, 1997 – September 30, 1997
- President: Bill Clinton
- Preceded by: Weldon L. Kennedy
- Succeeded by: Robert M. Bryant

Personal details
- Born: February 28, 1946 (age 80) New York City, New York, U.S.

William J. Esposito (born February 28, 1946) is an American former FBI agent who served as Deputy Director of the Federal Bureau of Investigation in 1997.
