= Floyd I. Clarke =

Former FBI director, lawyer (born 1942)

Floyd Clarke
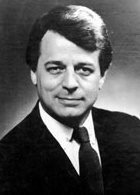

Director of the Federal Bureau of Investigation
- Acting
- In office July 19, 1993 – September 1, 1993
- President: Bill Clinton
- Preceded by: William S. Sessions
- Succeeded by: Louis Freeh

5th Deputy Director of the Federal Bureau of Investigation
- In office May 11, 1979 – July 19, 1993
- President: Jimmy Carter; Ronald Reagan; George H. W. Bush; Bill Clinton
- Preceded by: James B. Adams
- Succeeded by: David G. Binney

Personal details
- Born: January 7, 1942 (age 84) Phoenix, Arizona, U.S.
- Education: George Washington University (BA, JD)

Floyd I. Clarke (born January 7, 1942) is a former acting director of the Federal Bureau of Investigation (FBI) in the United States.

== Biography ==
Clarke was born in Phoenix, Arizona. He attended George Washington University in Washington, D.C., where he obtained a Bachelor of Arts and later a law degree. He joined the FBI as a special agent in 1964, working in the Birmingham, Boston, Philadelphia, and Kansas City Divisions as well as at FBI Headquarters. He progressed from special agent to supervisor, assistant special agent in charge, special agent in charge, assistant director, executive assistant director, deputy director, and finally acting director.

Bill Clinton, the forty-second president of the United States, was inaugurated on January 20, 1993, and resolved to replace then FBI director William S. Sessions. Sessions was dismissed on July 19 after refusing to resign, and Louis Freeh was nominated to the post at a Rose Garden ceremony the following day. Clarke was named acting director, and served from the 19th until September 1, 1993, when Freeh was sworn in.

Clarke then retired from the FBI. He joined MacAndrews & Forbes, a private firm specializing in acquisitions, where he served as vice president for corporate compliance.

Government offices
Preceded by James B. Adams	Deputy Director of the Federal Bureau of Investigation; 1979–1993	Succeeded by David G. Binney
Preceded by William S. Sessions	Director of the Federal Bureau of Investigation; Acting; 1993	Succeeded by Louis Freeh
