= Weldon L. Kennedy =

FBI executive (1938–2020)

Weldon Lynn Kennedy

8th Deputy Director of the FBI
- In office August 8, 1995 – February 1997
- President: Bill Clinton
- Preceded by: Larry A. Potts
- Succeeded by: William J. Esposito

Personal details
- Born: September 12, 1938
- Died: June 13, 2020 (aged 81)
- Spouse: Kathy Werner (m. 1959)
- Education: University of Texas, Austin (BA)

Military service
- Allegiance: United States
- Branch/service: United States Navy
- Years of service: 1959-1963
- Rank: Lieutenant (Junior Grade)

Weldon Lynn Kennedy (September 12, 1938 – June 13, 2020) was an American federal law enforcement officer who served as Deputy Director of the FBI from 1995-1997. A career FBI special agent, Kennedy was known for negotiating a peaceful end to the Atlanta Prison Riots, as well as leading the investigation of the Oklahoma City Bombing.

== Early Life & Career ==
Kennedy was born in 1938 in Menlow, Texas, a small community in Hill County that no longer exists. He attended various public schools in Texas, and received his high school diploma in Edinburg, Texas, where he was class president. He earned a Bachelor of Arts degree at the University of Texas, Austin, where he enrolled in the Naval Reserve Officers Training Corps. While in college, he met his future wife Kathy Werner. He graduated, received his Naval commission, and was married all on the same day in May of 1959. After his commission, he served as a Lieutenant (junior grade) in the United States Navy's Office of Naval Intelligence from 1959 to 1963.

In July 1963, Kennedy began training at the FBI Academy at Quantico, Virginia. He received sixteen weeks of training before graduating as a special agent. Kennedy served in the FBI, rising through the ranks before taking charge of the Atlanta Field Office.

== Involvement in the Atlanta Prison Riots ==
On Monday, November 23, 1987, prisoners of the Federal Correctional Institution in Atlanta, Georgia began rioting in reaction to a decision to deport 2,500 incarcerated Cubans back to Cuba. Many of these prisoners preferred life in the United States, even while incarcerated, as opposed to the conditions in Cuba. The 11-day riot saw prisoners take over 100 hostages and burn down a part of the facility in an attempt to negotiate a different fate, in what would eventually become the longest prison riot in U.S. history.

Kennedy was the leader of the FBI in Atlanta at the time of the riots. While interacting with the prisoners, Kennedy learned that the Cuban prisoners wanted outside negotiators that they could trust brought in to the prison. Thus, Kennedy brought into the prison Auxiliary Bishop Agustin Roman of Miami and a group of American Civil Liberties Union lawyers who had sympathized with the Cuban prisoners in the past. Eventually, Kennedy was able to oversee a peaceful end to the riots. The prisoners reached a surrender agreement, and the hostages were released.

== Investigation of Oklahoma City Bombing ==
In 1995, the Alfred P. Murrah Federal Building in Oklahoma City was bombed, killing 168 and injuring 684. Kennedy was appointed to oversee the massive investigation, known as OKBOMB. It involved 900 federal, state, and local law enforcement personnel, including 300 FBI agents, 200 officers from the Oklahoma City Police Department, 125 members of the Oklahoma National Guard, and 55 officers from the Oklahoma Department of Public Safety. Kennedy's crime task force was deemed the largest in U.S. history since the investigation into the assassination of John F. Kennedy. OKBOMB was determined to be the largest criminal case in America's history at the time, with FBI agents conducting 28,000 interviews, amassing 3.5 short tons (3.2 t) of evidence, and collecting nearly one billion pieces of information. The investigation led to the successful convictions of the perpetrators, Timothy McVeigh and Terry Nichols.

== Later Life ==
In 1995, Kennedy was appointed as the Deputy Director of the FBI by Louis Freeh, the organization's second-highest post. He served in the role for shortly under two years before retiring from the agency. Following his retirement, he served as vice chairman of the security firm Guardsmark. He lived with his family in Prescott, Arizona. Kennedy died on June 13, 2020, at the age of 81. His memoir, On-Scene Commander: From Street Agent to Deputy Director of the FBI, was published on September 10, 2007.

Government offices
Preceded by Larry A. Potts	Deputy Director of the Federal Bureau of Investigation; 1995–1997	Succeeded by William J. Esposito
