= Hutaree =

American anti-government militia group

- Hutaree
- Founder: David Brian Stone Sr
- Founding leader: David Brian Stone Sr
- Founded: 2006
- Dates active: 2006–2010
- Dissolved: 2010
- Active regions: Michigan, United States
- Ideology: Apocalypticism; Survivalism; Theoconservatism
- Political position: Far-right

Hutaree /huːˈtɑːriː/ was a militia movement group adhering to the ideology of the Christian Patriot movement, based near Adrian, Michigan, in the United States. The group formed in early 2006. The name "Hutaree" appears to be a neologism; the group's website says that the name means "Christian warriors", but an investigation by the FBI concluded the word does not have a Christian background. The group became widely known in 2010 after the United States FBI prosecuted them in federal court for an alleged plan for violent revolt. The prosecution said they intended to kill a police officer and to attack the funeral with bombs. The presiding judge dismissed these charges. Three members pleaded guilty to possessing a machine gun and were sentenced to time served.

== Beliefs ==
The Hutaree's website claimed: "We see the end of the age coming quickly, and with it some very rough times ahead, as foretold by God's word." The militia describes its goals. "The only thing on earth to save the testimony and those who follow it, are the members of the testimony, until the return of Christ in the clouds. We Hutaree are prepared to defend all who belong to Christ and save them. To those who do not, we will still spread the word and fight to keep it, until the time of the great coming."

According to some sources, the group is described as practicing survivalism. Most of the members were active voters with unidentified political party affiliations.

The Hutaree has been known to lend assistance to other militias in the past, with such things as searching for missing persons.

The Hutaree insignia includes a sword, crossed spears, and the letters "CCR" which stand for "Colonial Christian Republic". Hutaree members use a unique system of paramilitary ranks with titles from highest to lowest: Radok, Boramander, Zulif, Arkon, Rifleman (three grades), Lukore, and Gunner (three grades). University of Pennsylvania linguistics professor Mark Liberman commented: "I don't see basis in biblical or military history for Radok, Boramander, Zulif, Arkon, and Lukore."

The group remained exclusively Christian but attempted to maintain relationships with individuals and groups that adhere to other beliefs, especially within the militia movement. One militia associate of the group, named Matt Savino, was denied membership in the Hutaree when he revealed that he was a Muslim. Savino was referred to join the Michigan Militia by the Hutaree who declined his membership but maintained contact with Mr Savino. Savino eventually was elected to be a "Colonel" in the Michigan Militia. Savino later provided information to the Federal Bureau of Investigation (FBI) which appears to have assisted them in capturing the last indicted Hutaree at large, Joshua Stone.

== Criminal investigation ==
From March 28 to 30, 2010, nine people thought to be Hutaree members were arrested in police raids in Michigan, Ohio, and Indiana (in Hammond), for their alleged involvement in a plot to kill various police officers and possibly civilians using illegal explosives and/or firearms. An undercover agent played a role in the investigation that led to indictments. Grand jury testimony by a law enforcement officer referred to an "undercover FBI agent" who worked on the case; the FBI declined to comment, but infiltration is a common tactic for law-enforcement officials targeting domestic militia groups. The FBI informant was later revealed to be Hal Turner.

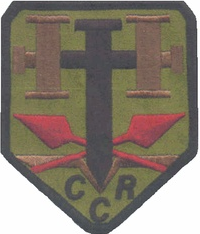
patch worn commonly for militant members

The group was allegedly preparing for what they believed would be an apocalyptic battle with the forces of the Antichrist, who they believed would be supported and defended by local, state, and federal law enforcement.

On May 3, 2010, a federal judge ordered that all nine members be freed on bond until their trial, saying that prosecutors were not able to demonstrate that the defendants would pose a danger if released.

The United States Attorney's Office stated that the Hutaree allegedly planned "to kill an unidentified member of local law enforcement and then attack the law enforcement officers who gather in Michigan for the funeral". The press release further stated that nine had been indicted by a federal grand jury in Detroit on charges of seditious conspiracy, attempted use of weapons of mass destruction, teaching the use of explosive materials, and possessing a firearm during a crime of violence. The indictment said that the Hutaree planned to attack unspecified law enforcement vehicles during the funeral procession for an unspecified officer or officers they planned to kill on an unspecified occasion, using unspecified explosively formed penetrator improvised explosive devices (which under federal law are considered "weapons of mass destruction").

Some articles suggested the Hutaree had not yet determined whom they would kill in law enforcement, or even that they wished to kill a law enforcement officer to begin a war with law enforcement, while not having any specific target. The FBI was aided in its investigation by members of another militia group.

=== Members taken into custody ===
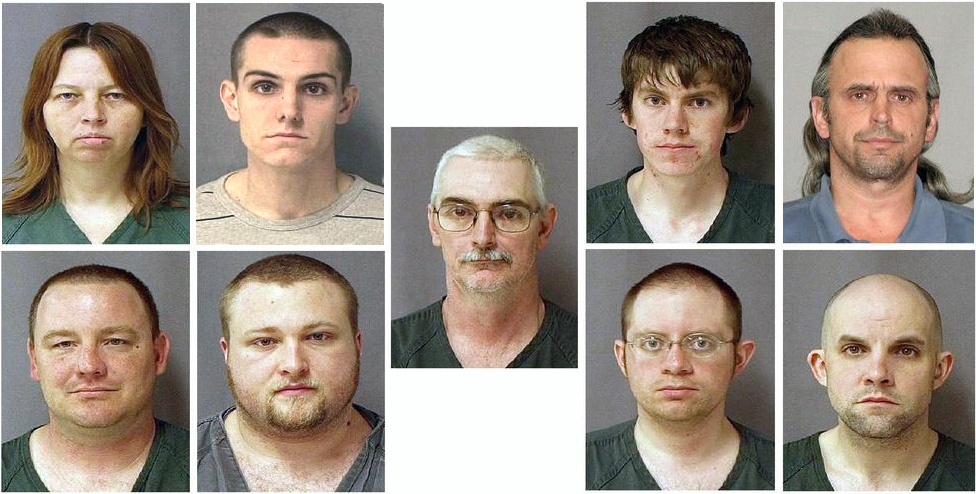
In order as shown: Tina Mae Stone, Joshua Matthew Stone, David Brian Stone Sr., David Brian Stone Jr., Thomas William Piatek, Michael David Meeks, Kristopher T. Sickles, Joshua Clough, Jacob J. Ward

Nine members of the group who were arrested:

- Tina Mae Stone, 44
- Joshua Matthew Stone, 21
- David Brian Stone Sr, 44, center (a.k.a. "RD", "Joe Stonewall", "Captain Hutaree")
- David Brian Stone Jr., 19 (a.k.a. "Junior")
- Thomas William Piatek, 46
- Michael David Meeks, 40
- Kristopher T. Sickles, 27 (a.k.a. "Pale Horse")
- Joshua Clough, 28 (a.k.a. "Azzurlin", "Az", "Mouse", "Jason Z", "Charles")
- Jacob J. Ward, 33 (a.k.a. "Jake", "Nate")

On May 3, 2010, U.S. District Judge Victoria A. Roberts ordered all nine defendants to be released on bond, over the objection of federal prosecutors. "The order is silent as to any financial aspects of the bonds. In federal court, defendants are normally released on $10,000 unsecured bonds, meaning they do not have to put up any money." The court ruled that five of the Hutaree remain in custody. The ruling applied to David Stone Sr., Joshua Stone, Joshua Clough, Michael Meeks, and Thomas Piatek. Four other members had already been released on bond. The court ordered that they be placed on electronic monitors.

In addition to being confined to their homes, outside of time spent away from work (or while seeking employment as per standard federal pretrial release conditions), some additional requirements were placed on individual defendants, for example, alleged leader David Brian Stone Sr. was barred from having any contact with Michigan-based militia activist Mark Koernke.

Prosecutors added charges in June 2012 stating that David Stone Sr., Joshua Stone, and Clough illegally possessed automatic rifles and that David Stone Sr., David Stone Jr., and Joshua Stone possessed unregistered firearms, charging them with violations of the National Firearms Act. Clough had earlier entered a guilty plea in December 2011 to a weapons law violation in a plea agreement, with leniency suggested in light of his cooperative testimony in the case. David Stone Sr. and Joshua Stone eventually later entered a guilty pleas in March 2012 to some NFA violations as part of a plea agreement.

=== Pre-trial hearings ===
In February 2011, Judge Victoria A. Roberts set a new trial date of September 13, 2011, after defense attorneys asked for more time to review the hundreds of pages of evidence prosecutors had provided them. Attorneys also cited the complexity of the case in asking for a delay. The case originally was to go to trial on February 28, 2011. Roberts first delayed the trial in December 2010 until April after attorneys made a similar request. Defense attorneys argued that statements made by Hutaree were constitutionally protected free speech and not plans for an attack.

In January 2012, a federal judge issued an order granting the defense attorneys' motion to exclude prosecution testimony by an expert drawing parallels between the defendants' beliefs and various conspiracy theories about Ruby Ridge, the Waco siege, the Oklahoma City bombing, and 9/11, concluding: "It is largely irrelevant to the issues in dispute and what little probative value it might add is substantially outweighed by the risks of undue prejudice, confusion and misleading the jury."

=== Trial ===
The trial began on February 13, 2012. On March 27, 2012, a federal judge acquitted seven Hutaree defendants of the most serious charges related to conspiracy and sedition; they were free to go. David Stone Sr. and Joshua Stone continued to be held on weapons-related charges. On August 8, 2012, David Stone Sr., Joshua Stone, and Joshua Clough were sentenced to time served on weapons-related charges, to which they pleaded guilty, and placed under supervision for two years.

=== Return of seized property ===
After the acquittal of seven Hutaree members, the property seized during a March 2010 raid was returned to the owners. Items included a wedding ring, firearms and surplus items of military equipment previously owned by Hutaree members. The FBI returned Tina Stone's six guns, including her AR-15 semi-automatic rifle.

Seized items that had been returned included hundreds of thousands of rounds of ammunition, numerous weapons and other material, but several items, including illegal weapons taken as evidence, had been destroyed by the Justice Department.

=== Lawsuit ===
Following the group's acquittal, Piatek and two other members filed a lawsuit against the federal agents who had infiltrated the group claiming violation of due process as well as first and second amendment violations. In May, 2015, an appeals court rejected to hear their claim.

== See also ==
- Michigan Militia
- Gretchen Whitmer kidnapping plot, which included potential plans to assault a Michigan State Police station by a separate militia group
