= Clarence M. Kelley =

2nd Director of the FBI (1973–1978)

Clarence Kelley
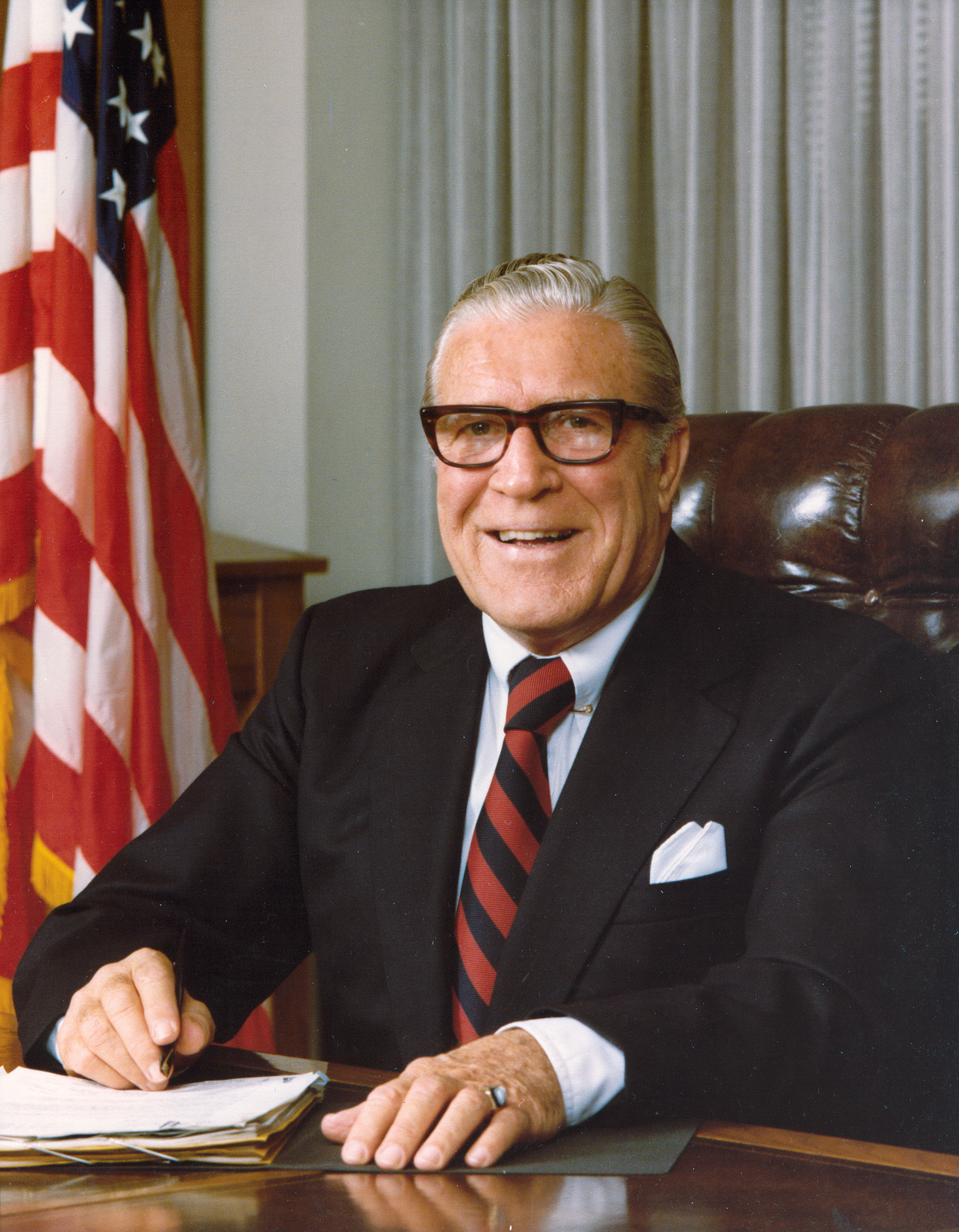

2nd Director of the Federal Bureau of Investigation
- In office July 9, 1973 – February 15, 1978
- President: Richard Nixon; Gerald Ford; Jimmy Carter
- Deputy: James B. Adams
- Preceded by: J. Edgar Hoover
- Succeeded by: William H. Webster

Personal details
- Born: Clarence Marion Kelley; October 24, 1911 Kansas City, Missouri, U.S.
- Died: August 5, 1997 (aged 85) Kansas City, Missouri, U.S.
- Party: Republican
- Spouses: Ruby Pickett (m. 1937; died 1975); Shirley Dyckes (m. 1976–1997)
- Children: 2
- Education: University of Kansas (BA); University of Missouri, Kansas City (LLB)

Military service
- Allegiance: United States
- Branch/service: United States Navy
- Years of service: 1944–1946

Clarence Marion Kelley (October 24, 1911 – August 5, 1997) was an American law enforcement officer. He served as the Chief of the Kansas City Police Department in Kansas City, Missouri, from 1961 to 1973, and as the second director of the Federal Bureau of Investigation from 1973 to 1978.

== Early life and education ==
Clarence Kelley was born in Kansas City, Missouri, on October 24, 1911. He attended Northeast High School, where he was nicknamed "Chief" and held a 0.300 baseball batting average. He received his Bachelor of Arts degree from the University of Kansas in 1936, where he was a member of Sigma Nu fraternity. He continued his education to earn an LL.B. from the University of Kansas City, Missouri, in 1940. He was admitted to the Missouri Bar the same year. The Kansas City Police department would eulogize him as having been "destined to enter law enforcement".

== Early FBI career ==
Kelley joined the Federal Bureau of Investigation as a Special Agent on October 7, 1940. He served in field offices in Huntington, West Virginia; Pittsburgh, Pennsylvania; Des Moines, Iowa; and the FBI Training Center in Quantico, Virginia. He served in the United States Navy from July 22, 1944, to April 9, 1946, having been granted military leave from the FBI.

Returning from military service, Kelley was assigned to the Kansas City office, where his performance earned him a promotion to field supervisor. He also served at FBI Headquarters in Washington, D.C., in 1951. From July 1953 to July 1957, he served as Assistant Special Agent in Charge at the Houston, Seattle, and San Francisco offices. He was then transferred to the Training and Inspection Division at FBI Headquarters, becoming an Inspector. In December 1957, he was promoted to Special Agent in Charge of the Birmingham office and was reassigned to the Memphis office in November 1960, where he served as Special Agent in Charge until his retirement from the FBI on October 24, 1961.

== Kansas City police ==
At the recommendation of Attorney General Robert F. Kennedy, Kelley became the Chief of the Kansas City Police Department in Kansas City, Missouri, serving from 1961 to 1973. He installed a computer system to check driver's license plates.

In 1970 Kelley received the J. Edgar Hoover Gold Medal presented by the Veterans of Foreign Wars. The following year he was named to the Presidential Advisory Committee, and served on both the National Advisory Commission on Criminal Justice Standards and Goals and on the FBI National Academy Review Committee from 1972 to 1973.

== Director of the FBI (1973–1978) ==
On June 7, 1973, President Richard Nixon nominated Kelley to be Director of the FBI. The United States Senate confirmed the nomination June 27 and he was sworn in on July 9. Kelley was the first Director of the FBI to be appointed through the nomination and confirmation process; furthermore, he was only the second non-acting director of the FBI. During his time as Director, Kelley eliminated the embezzlement practices that had been prevalent in the administrative division under J. Edgar Hoover's directorship through his cooperation with a Justice Department investigation. Kelley also reopened relations with other intelligence agencies, such as the Central Intelligence Agency which had nearly been shut down by Hoover in his last years as director.

Kelley helped the FBI transition from its 40 plus years of being dominated by a single director, J. Edgar Hoover, by attempting to improve its public image. At the same time, he tried not to antagonize FBI agents who had been loyal to Hoover.

Kelley's intention to retire, revealed in 1977, prompted an exhaustive year-long search for a successor. President Jimmy Carter finally decided on William H. Webster, who was nominated in January 1978. Kelley retired from the FBI February 15, 1978, and was temporarily succeeded by James B. Adams, who served as Acting Director until Webster's confirmation 8 days later.

== Clarence M. Kelley and Associates ==
Kelley founded Clarence M. Kelley and Associates, Inc. (CMKA), a security and investigation firm, in 1982. CMKA is now one of the nation's leading Professional Investigative and Security Consulting Firms. CMKA provides a broad spectrum of investigative and security related services nationally and abroad.

CMKA offers security consulting services to businesses, hospitals, schools, and churches.

== Personal life and death ==
Kelley was an elder of the Disciples of Christ. He was married twice. With his first wife Ruby Pickett, he had a son and a daughter. A year after she died in 1975, he married a former Catholic nun previously known as Sister Bernadine, née Shirley Dyckes. She published her memoir, Love Is Not for Cowards, in 1978. Kelley published his own memoir, Kelley: The Story of an FBI Director, in 1987.

Kelley died on August 5, 1997, in his sleep from natural causes in his Kansas City home, at age 85. His remains were later buried at Mount Washington Cemetery in Independence, Missouri.

Government offices
Preceded by William Ruckelshaus; Acting	Director of the Federal Bureau of Investigation; 1973–1978	Succeeded by James B. Adams; Acting
