= James Dennehy =

Former FBI official

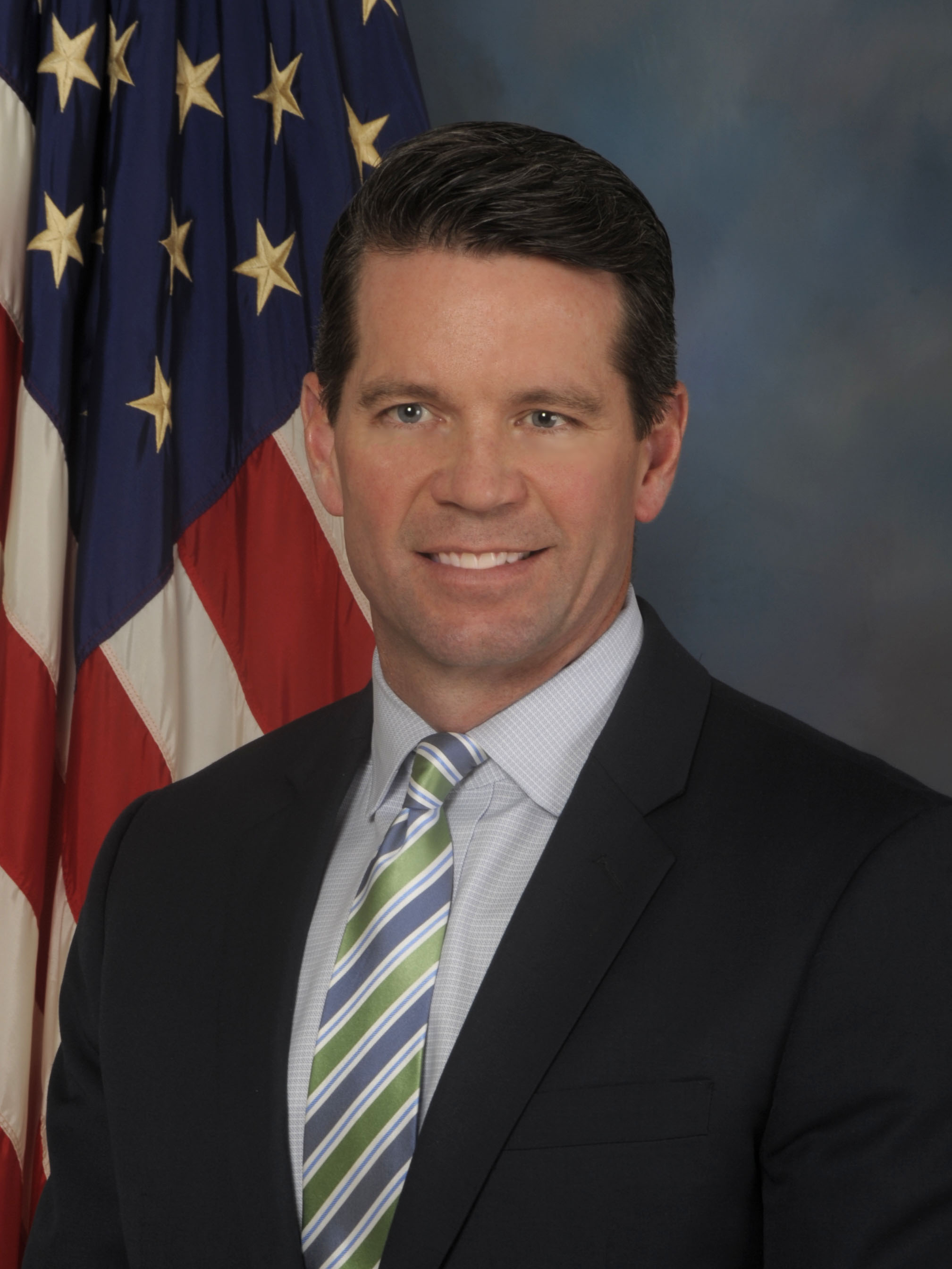
- Police career
- Allegiance: United States
- Department: Federal Bureau of Investigation
- Service years: 2002-2025
- Rank: Assistant director in charge
- Awards: National Intelligence Meritorious Unit Citation

James E. Dennehy is a former Federal Bureau of Investigation (FBI) official who served as the assistant director in charge of the New York Field Office from September 2024 until his directed retirement in early 2025. Prior to his tenure in New York City, he held leadership roles within the FBI, including special agent in charge of the intelligence and surveillance division and head of the Newark Field Office, following a career in counterintelligence and counterproliferation.

== Education ==
Dennehy earned a bachelor's degree in civil engineering from Villanova University.

== Career ==
=== U.S. Marine Corps ===
Dennehy served as an officer in the U.S. Marine Corps for seven years, during which he was deployed to Haiti, Liberia, and the Adriatic Sea.

In a later email to Federal Bureau of Investigation (FBI) staff, Dennehy referenced his time in the Marines, recalling an experience where he dug a five-foot-deep foxhole for protection, stating, "It sucked. But it worked."

=== Federal Bureau of Investigation ===
Dennehy joined the FBI as a special agent in 2002 and was assigned to the New York Field Office, where he worked on counterintelligence cases. In 2013, he was promoted to supervisory special agent of the counterintelligence and counterproliferation squad in the Hudson Valley and White Plains resident agencies in New York. In 2015, he became unit chief in the Counterproliferation Center at FBI headquarters. The following year, he was promoted to assistant section chief, overseeing efforts to prevent foreign adversaries from acquiring export-controlled technologies related to weapons of mass destruction and missile, space, and conventional weapons systems.

Dennehy returned to the New York Field Office in 2017 as assistant special agent in charge, where his responsibilities included crisis management, firearms, operations command, recruiting, private sector engagement, and community outreach. In 2018, he was promoted to chief of staff to the executive assistant director of the FBI National Security Branch (NSB) at FBI headquarters and also served as section chief of the NSB’s Executive Staff Section.

Dennehy later became special agent in charge of the Intelligence and Surveillance Division of the FBI’s New York Field Office. He subsequently served as head of the Newark Field Office for two years before being appointed assistant director in charge of the New York Field Office in September 2024. Dennehy received the FBI Director's Award for Outstanding Counterintelligence Investigation, the Attorney General's Award for Furthering the Interests of National Security, and multiple National Intelligence Meritorious Unit Citations.

In an email to staff shortly after the second presidential transition of Donald Trump, Dennehy wrote that the FBI was in "the middle of a battle" as officials were being removed from the bureau and targeted for their work. He expressed his support for the agency's acting leadership, Brian Driscoll and Robert Kissane, and told staff it was "time for [him] to dig in."

Amid the early 2025 U.S. federal mass layoffs, Dennehy was directed to retire from his role leading the FBI's New York Field Office. His departure followed conflicts with the U.S. Department of Justice over directives from the Trump administration, including a request for the names of FBI personnel involved in the January 6 United States Capitol attack investigation. U.S. Attorney General Pam Bondi criticized Dennehy's office for allegedly withholding files related to Jeffrey Epstein, though no evidence was provided to support this claim. Dennehy stated in an email to colleagues that he was given no reason for his removal.
