= Freeh Group Europe =

Freeh Group Europe is a global crisis management and risk management consulting firm headquartered in Zurich, Switzerland. The firm advises clients in the areas of corporate compliance, investigations, due diligence, and security. Former Federal Bureau of Investigation Director Louis Freeh has been the firm’s Honorary Chairman since its establishment in 2009.

== Overview ==
Freeh Group Europe is an independent consultancy whose clients include corporations in the manufacturing, pharmaceutical, sporting, technology, and logistics sectors.

Freeh Group Europe is affiliated with the U.S.-based firm Freeh Group International Solutions LLC and the law firm Freeh Sporkin & Sullivan LLP, whose founding partners include Stanley Sporkin, former General Counsel of the Central Intelligence Agency, and Eugene Sullivan, former Chief Judge of the United States Court of Appeals for the Armed Forces.

In addition to its Zurich headquarters, the firm maintains offices in Amsterdam, Rome, and Stuttgart. Its consultants include lawyers, accountants, forensic technology specialists, industry experts, and former law enforcement agents.

== History ==
In 2010, Freeh was appointed for a three-year term as an independent compliance monitor in the deferred prosecution agreement between the United States Department of Justice and Daimler AG.

In 2011, Freeh Group Europe was engaged by the FIFA Ethics Committee to investigate allegations of bribery at the global sporting organization. The Freeh Group inquiry uncovered evidence that former FIFA presidential candidate Mohamed bin Hammam offered cash to Caribbean Football Union officials in exchange for their votes in the Federation’s presidential election at the 61st FIFA Congress. This inquiry led to the resignation of FIFA vice president, Trinidadian Jack Warner, as well as a lifetime ban against participation in the organization for bin Hammam.

In the United States, Freeh has been retained to conduct an investigation into allegations of abuse at Pennsylvania State University, and has been appointed as trustee for the MF Global bankruptcy case.

== Key people ==
- Louis Freeh, honorary chairman, former director of the FBI
- José Hernandez, CEO, former partner at PricewaterhouseCoopers and faculty member at VU University Amsterdam
- John Rahie, senior partner, former general counsel of General Motors Europe and member of GM’s legal team during a 1990s industrial espionage and racketeering dispute with Volkswagen AG
