= Zieper v. Metzinger =

Zieper v. Metzinger was a case brought before the United States District Court for the District of New Jersey in which filmmaker Michael Zieper sued several officials of the Department of Justice. Zieper alleged that the actions of several Federal Bureau of Investigation agents and a United States Attorney may have violated the First Amendment rights of Zieper and others. The case was dismissed by the district court in 2005. The Second Circuit Court of Appeals affirmed the dismissal in 2007 on the basis of qualified immunity. One legal critic referred to the case as a "a paradigmatic case of improper government action to leverage the weakness of intermediaries".

At issue in the case was a film, Military Takeover in New York City, a work of fiction concerning the events of the upcoming New Year's Eve 1999. Produced by Michael Zieper of West Caldwell, New Jersey, the film was posted on the Internet at Zieper's personal website, CrowdedTheater.com. It was accompanied by a note claiming that Zieper got the video from his "cousin Steve who's in the Army". The complaint in the case later described the film as following the historical tradition of fictional portrayals of supposedly real events like The War of the Worlds and The Blair Witch Project.

A segment about the film was broadcast on New York television station UPN 9 on November 10, 1999. That night, West Caldwell police and FBI agents went to Zieper's home, although he was not arrested. After the FBI agents were unsuccessful in persuading Zieper to take the film down, they contacted Zieper's web hosting service, who took it down. The hosting service soon reconsidered and put the video back up, but became the focus of considerable online outrage for having bowed to pressure in suppressing the video.

The American Civil Liberties Union represented Zieper in suing the FBI for First Amendment violations in December 1999.

Agent Joe Metzinger of the FBI, one of the defendants named in the case, was involved in the investigation of Military Takeover in New York City. There were five co-defendants, including Metzinger. The others were: Attorney General Janet Reno; FBI Director Louis Freeh; Mary Jo White, U.S. Attorney for the Southern District of New York; and Lisa Korologos, assistant U.S. Attorney.
