= Tarek Bazrouk =

Palestinian-American activist

- Education: City University of New York
- Occupations: Student, activist
- Status: Convicted (pleaded guilty)
- Criminal charges: 3 counts of federal hate crimes
- Penalty: 17 months in federal prison forfeiture of $750,000 in cash

Details
- Imprisoned at: Metropolitan Detention Center

Tarek Bazrouk is a Palestinian-American activist. In 2025, he was convicted of federal hate crimes for assaulting Jewish demonstrators at multiple pro-Palestine protests in New York City in 2024 and 2025 during the Gaza war. Prosecutors stated that the attacks targeted individuals because of their Jewish or Israeli identity. Bazrouk pleaded guilty and was sentenced to 17 months in federal prison. His case attracted national attention and support from pro-Palestine activist groups.

== Background ==
Tarek Bazrouk is a Palestinian-American student at the City University of New York.

== Attacks ==
Bazrouk was arrested at three separate protests in Manhattan over approximately nine months. According to prosecutors, during these protests he assaulted Jewish protesters who were wearing religious attire or carrying Israeli flags.

In April 2024, Bazrouk, wearing a Hamas headband, scuffled with pro-Israel demonstrators outside the New York Stock Exchange. During his arrest and while being escorted to a police vehicle, he kicked a pro-Israel demonstrator in the stomach.

In December 2024, near Columbia University, two Jewish brothers carrying an Israeli flag started a verbal dispute with Bazrouk at a pro-Palestine protest, according to the NYPD. Bazrouk took the Israeli flag from the brothers, calling them "Nazis". When the brothers pursued him to retrieve the flag, Bazrouk struck one of them in the face. The December attack was condemned by New York Governor Kathy Hochul.

In January 2025, at another pro-Palestine protest, Bazrouk jostled with a Jewish counter-protester. After being pushed away, he responded by punching the man in the nose.

According to court filings and Bazrouk's plea, all of the victims were identifiable as Jewish, either through religious attire, symbols such as Stars of David, Israeli flags, or participation in Jewish songs. Two of the victims were students at Columbia University. According to a press release by Christopher G. Raia, the assistant director of the New York City field office of the FBI, Bazrouk's phone contained pro-Hamas propaganda and text messages in which he referred to himself as a "Jew hater". Prosecutors cited these messages as evidence of an antisemitic motive. Bazrouk told the court during his guilty plea that he carried out the attacks "to express my outrage over Israel's widespread killing and displacement of Palestinian civilians in the Gaza Strip".

== Legal proceedings ==
=== Hate crime charges and guilty plea ===
On May 7, 2025, Bazrouk was charged with three federal hate crimes. Bazrouk's prosecution came amid heightened scrutiny of pro-Palestinian demonstrations, which the Trump administration accused of antisemitism. According to Reuters, Bazrouk's case was the first time the U.S. Department of Justice brought federal hate-crime charges related to the Columbia University protests.

In June he pleaded guilty to targeting victims for their Jewish or Israeli identity. As part of his plea agreement, he forfeited $750,000 in cash to authorities; the source of the funds was not disclosed.

=== Support campaigns, sentencing, and release ===
Bazrouk's case became a cause célèbre among anti-Israel activist groups in the United States. Organizations including Students for Justice in Palestine, Palestinian Youth Movement, Within Our Lifetime, Pal-Awda, and Columbia University Apartheid Divest publicly expressed support for Bazrouk. Ahead of his sentencing, these groups encouraged supporters to send letters requesting leniency or to contribute to Bazrouk's commissary. More than 11,000 people signed a letter asking Richard Berman to allow Bazrouk to complete his sentence under supervised release rather than serve additional prison time. Seth Mandel argued that pro-Palestinian groups' advocacy for Bazrouk indicated that the movement had the main organizing goal of attacking Jews' freedom of speech, expression, and association.

Before his sentencing, Bazrouk served six months at the Metropolitan Detention Center. On October 23, 2025, he was sentenced to 17 months in federal prison. According to activist groups such as CUNY for Palestine and PAL-Awda, Bazrouk was freed on June 24, 2026, after completing an early release program.

After Bazrouk's June 2026 release from federal detention, pro-Palestinian groups stated that, "Just as Tarek was liberated today, the tens of thousands of prisoners who remain steadfast in Zionist prisons will be liberated." A fundraiser for Bazrouk by the Anti-Imperialist Student Front raised over $11,000.

=== Civil litigation ===
In November 2025, the twin brothers who were assaulted by Bazrouk during a protest near Columbia University in December 2024 sued Columbia, alleging that the university failed to protect Jewish students after the October 7 attacks.
