= Larry A. Potts =

7th Deputy Director of the FBI

7th Deputy Director of the Federal Bureau of Investigation
- In office February 1995 – July 14, 1995; Acting: February 1995 – May 2, 1995
- President: Bill Clinton
- Preceded by: David G. Binney
- Succeeded by: Weldon L. Kennedy

Larry A. Potts is an American former FBI agent who briefly served as Deputy Director of the Federal Bureau of Investigation in 1995. Potts was demoted due to investigation into two infamous high-profile FBI controversies in which he had been involved, namely the 1992 Ruby Ridge standoff with American survivalist Randy Weaver in Idaho, and the 1993 siege at the Texas Branch Davidian church led by David Koresh.

According to federal prison inmate Terry Nichols, Potts was supposedly Timothy McVeigh's FBI handler (while they were conspiring the Oklahoma City bombing); However Nichols' jailhouse confession has never been corroborated; Insisting McVeigh only accidentally let slip his handler's identity, allegedly, in the winter of 1995, when McVeigh expressed his animosity towards Potts, believing the handler was 'manipulating him and forcing him to go off script, which [Nichols] understood meant to change the target of the bombing.'
