= David G. Binney =

FBI agent

6th Deputy Director of the Federal Bureau of Investigation
- In office February 1994 – December 1994
- President: Bill Clinton
- Preceded by: Floyd I. Clarke
- Succeeded by: Larry A. Potts

Personal details
- Born: November 3, 1940 Wrentham, Massachusetts, U.S.
- Died: October 4, 2008 (aged 67) Mount Pleasant, South Carolina, U.S.

David G. Binney (November 3, 1940 – October 4, 2008) was an American FBI agent who served as Deputy Director of the Federal Bureau of Investigation in 1994.
