= United States Senate Judiciary Subcommittee on Terrorism and Homeland Security =

US Senate subcommittee of the Senate Judiciary Committee

The United States Senate Judiciary Subcommittee on Terrorism and Homeland Security was one of six subcommittees within the Senate Judiciary Committee during the 113th Congress.

== Jurisdiction ==
The subcommittee's jurisdiction included oversight of the Departments of Justice and Homeland Security and the State Department's consular operations with regard to anti-terrorism enforcement and policy. The jurisdiction also included oversight of government encryption policies and encryption export licensing and oversight of espionage laws and their enforcement.

== Members, 113th Congress ==
The subcommittee was chaired by Democrat Al Franken of Minnesota, and the Ranking Minority Member was Republican Jeff Flake of Arizona.

Majority	Minority
Al Franken, Minnesota, Chairman; Dianne Feinstein, California; Chuck Schumer, New York; Dick Durbin, Illinois; Amy Klobuchar, Minnesota; Sheldon Whitehouse, Rhode Island	Jeff Flake, Arizona, Ranking Member; Orrin Hatch, Utah; Jeff Sessions, Alabama; John Cornyn, Texas

== See also ==
- U.S. House Judiciary Subcommittee on Courts, the Internet, and Intellectual Property
- U.S. House Judiciary Subcommittee on Crime, Terrorism, and Homeland Security
- U.S. Senate Judiciary Subcommittee on Criminal Justice and Counterterrorism
