= Director of the Federal Bureau of Investigation =

Head of the agency

- Seal of the FBI

- Flag of the FBI

- Incumbent; Kash Patel since February 21, 2025
- Federal Bureau of Investigation
- Reports to: Attorney General; Director of National Intelligence
- Seat: J. Edgar Hoover Building, Washington, D.C.
- Appointer: The president; with Senate advice and consent
- Term length: At the pleasure of the president. (10 years by statute), renewable (only by the Senate)
- Formation: July 26, 1908
- First holder: Stanley Finch
- Deputy: Deputy Director
- Website: www.fbi.gov

The director of the Federal Bureau of Investigation is the head of the Federal Bureau of Investigation (FBI), a United States federal law enforcement agency, and is responsible for its day-to-day operations. The FBI director is appointed for a single 10-year term by the president of the United States and confirmed by the Senate. The FBI is an agency within the Department of Justice (DOJ), and thus the director reports to the attorney general of the United States.

The director briefed the president on any issues that arose from within the FBI until the Intelligence Reform and Terrorism Prevention Act of 2004 was enacted following the September 11 attacks. Since then, the director reports in an additional capacity to the director of national intelligence, as the FBI is also part of the United States Intelligence Community.

The incumbent FBI director is Kash Patel, who was sworn in on February 21, 2025.

== Term of office ==
The FBI director is appointed by the president and, since 1972, subject to confirmation by the Senate. J. Edgar Hoover, appointed by President Calvin Coolidge to the predecessor office of Director of the Bureau of Investigation in 1924, was by far the longest-serving director, holding the position from its establishment under the current title in 1935 until his death in 1972. In 1976, in response to Hoover's lengthy tenure and during the Watergate era, by an amendment to the 1968 Omnibus Crime Control Act, Congress limited the term of future FBI directors to ten years, "an unusually long tenure that Congress established to insulate the director from political pressure." This rule was waived by the Senate for Robert Mueller on July 27, 2011, due to serious security concerns at that time. Since 1976, directors serve a ten-year term unless they resign, die, or are removed, but in practice, since Hoover, none have served a full ten years, except Mueller who served twelve years with the leave of Congress.

The director of the FBI can be removed from office by the president of the United States. After removal and until a replacement is confirmed by the U.S. Senate, the deputy director automatically acts in the role. The appointment of the deputy director is not a presidential appointment and does not require Senate confirmation. The president can appoint an interim director pending Senate confirmation or nominate a permanent director.

== Responsibilities ==
Along with the deputy director, the director ensures that cases and operations are handled correctly. The director also is in charge of staffing the leadership in any one of the FBI field offices with qualified agents.

== Nominations ==
The President of the United States appoints the director of the FBI, with the Senate's advice and consent. The President's nominees are referred to the Senate Judiciary Committee. The Committee arranges hearings, and thereafter votes on whether to advance the nomination to the consideration of the entire Senate.

Image	Name	Announced	Nominated by	Hearing date(s)	Committee vote result	Committee vote date	Cloture vote result	Cloture vote date	Floor vote result	Floor vote date	Further Details
	William S. Sessions	Jul 24, 1987	Ronald Reagan	Sep 9, 1987	Reported Favorably	Sep 15, 1987	N/A	N/A	90–0	Sep 25, 1987	Congress.gov Page
	Louis Freeh	Jul 20, 1993	Bill Clinton	Jul 29, 1993	Reported Favorably	Aug 3, 1993	N/A	N/A	Confirmed by voice vote	Aug 6, 1993	Congress.gov Page
	Robert Mueller	Jul 5, 2001	George W. Bush	Jul 30, 2001 – Jul 31, 2001	Reported Favorably	Aug 2, 2001	N/A	N/A	98–0	Aug 2, 2001	Congress.gov Page
	James Comey	Jun 21, 2013	Barack Obama	Jul 9, 2013	Reported Favorably	Jul 18, 2013	Withdrawn by unanimous consent	Jul 29, 2013	93–1	Jul 29, 2013	Congress.gov Page
	Christopher A. Wray	Jun 7, 2017	Donald Trump	Jul 12, 2017	20–0	Jul 20, 2017	N/A	N/A	92–5	Aug 1, 2017	Congress.gov Page
	Kashyap Pramod Patel	Nov 30, 2024	Donald Trump	Jan 30, 2025	12–10	Feb 13, 2025	51–47 (Note: A procedural vote to move Patel's nomination forward passed 48–45 on February 18, 2025.)	Feb 20, 2025	51–49	Feb 20, 2025	Congress.gov Page

== Lists of officeholders ==
=== Bureau of Investigation chiefs and directors (1908–1935) ===
When the Bureau of Investigation (BOI) was established in 1908, its head was called Chief of the Bureau of Investigation. It was changed to the director of the Bureau of Investigation in the term of William J. Flynn (1919–1921) and to its current name when the BOI was renamed FBI in 1935.

The following persons served as chief of the Bureau of Investigation:

Denotes acting capacity.

No.	Image	Name	Start	End	Duration	Refs.	President(s)
1		Stanley Finch	July 26, 1908	April 30, 1912	3 years, 279 days		Theodore Roosevelt (1901–1909)
1		Stanley Finch	July 26, 1908	April 30, 1912	3 years, 279 days		William Howard Taft (1909–1913)
2		A. Bruce Bielaski	April 30, 1912	February 10, 1919	6 years, 286 days		William Howard Taft (1909–1913)
2		A. Bruce Bielaski	April 30, 1912	February 10, 1919	6 years, 286 days		Woodrow Wilson (1913–1921)
–		William E. Allen; Acting	February 10, 1919	June 30, 1919	140 days		Woodrow Wilson (1913–1921)
3		William J. Flynn	July 1, 1919	August 22, 1921	2 years, 52 days		Woodrow Wilson (1913–1921)
3		William J. Flynn	July 1, 1919	August 22, 1921	2 years, 52 days		Warren G. Harding (1921–1923)
4		William J. Burns	August 22, 1921	May 10, 1924	2 years, 262 days		Warren G. Harding (1921–1923)
4		William J. Burns	August 22, 1921	May 10, 1924	2 years, 262 days		Calvin Coolidge (1923–1929)
5		J. Edgar Hoover	May 10, 1924	June 30, 1935	11 years, 51 days		Calvin Coolidge (1923–1929)
5		J. Edgar Hoover	May 10, 1924	June 30, 1935	11 years, 51 days		Herbert Hoover (1929–1933)
5		J. Edgar Hoover	May 10, 1924	June 30, 1935	11 years, 51 days		Franklin D. Roosevelt (1933–1945)

=== Federal Bureau of Investigation directors (1935–present) ===
The FBI became an independent service within the Department of Justice in 1935. In the same year, its name was officially changed to the present-day Federal Bureau of Investigation (FBI), with J. Edgar Hoover receiving the current title of Director of the Federal Bureau of Investigation. Since 1972, the United States Senate has had to confirm the nomination of a permanent officeholder. Frank Johnson had been nominated by Jimmy Carter in 1977, but withdrew for health reasons.

The following persons served as director of the Federal Bureau of Investigation:

Denotes acting capacity.

No.	Image	Name	Start	End	Duration	Refs.	President(s)
1		J. Edgar Hoover	June 30, 1935	May 2, 1972	36 years, 307 days		Franklin D. Roosevelt (1933–1945)
1		J. Edgar Hoover	June 30, 1935	May 2, 1972	36 years, 307 days		Harry S. Truman (1945–1953)
1		J. Edgar Hoover	June 30, 1935	May 2, 1972	36 years, 307 days		Dwight D. Eisenhower (1953–1961)
1		J. Edgar Hoover	June 30, 1935	May 2, 1972	36 years, 307 days		John F. Kennedy (1961–1963)
1		J. Edgar Hoover	June 30, 1935	May 2, 1972	36 years, 307 days		Lyndon B. Johnson (1963–1969)
1		J. Edgar Hoover	June 30, 1935	May 2, 1972	36 years, 307 days		Richard Nixon (1969–1974)
–		Clyde Tolson; Acting	May 2, 1972	May 3, 1972	1 day		Richard Nixon (1969–1974)
–		L. Patrick Gray; Acting	May 3, 1972	April 27, 1973	359 days		Richard Nixon (1969–1974)
–		Bill Ruckelshaus; Acting	April 30, 1973	July 9, 1973	70 days		Richard Nixon (1969–1974)
2		Clarence M. Kelley	July 9, 1973	February 15, 1978	4 years, 221 days		Richard Nixon (1969–1974)
2		Clarence M. Kelley	July 9, 1973	February 15, 1978	4 years, 221 days		Gerald Ford (1974–1977)
2		Clarence M. Kelley	July 9, 1973	February 15, 1978	4 years, 221 days		Jimmy Carter (1977–1981)
–		James B. Adams; Acting	February 15, 1978	February 23, 1978	8 days		Jimmy Carter (1977–1981)
3		Bill Webster	February 23, 1978	May 25, 1987	9 years, 91 days		Jimmy Carter (1977–1981)
3		Bill Webster	February 23, 1978	May 25, 1987	9 years, 91 days		Ronald Reagan (1981–1989)
–		John E. Otto; Acting	May 25, 1987	November 2, 1987	160 days		Ronald Reagan (1981–1989)
4		William S. Sessions	November 2, 1987	July 19, 1993	5 years, 259 days		Ronald Reagan (1981–1989)
4		William S. Sessions	November 2, 1987	July 19, 1993	5 years, 259 days		George H. W. Bush (1989–1993)
4		William S. Sessions	November 2, 1987	July 19, 1993	5 years, 259 days		Bill Clinton (1993–2001)
–		Floyd I. Clarke; Acting	July 19, 1993	September 1, 1993	44 days		Bill Clinton (1993–2001)
5		Louis Freeh	September 1, 1993	June 25, 2001	7 years, 297 days		Bill Clinton (1993–2001)
5		Louis Freeh	September 1, 1993	June 25, 2001	7 years, 297 days		George W. Bush (2001–2009)
–		Thomas J. Pickard; Acting	June 25, 2001	September 4, 2001	71 days		George W. Bush (2001–2009)
6		Robert Mueller	September 4, 2001	September 4, 2013	12 years, 0 days		George W. Bush (2001–2009)
6		Robert Mueller	September 4, 2001	September 4, 2013	12 years, 0 days		Barack Obama (2009–2017)
7		James Comey	September 4, 2013	May 9, 2017	3 years, 247 days		Barack Obama (2009–2017)
7		James Comey	September 4, 2013	May 9, 2017	3 years, 247 days		Donald Trump (2017–2021)
–		Andrew McCabe; Acting	May 9, 2017	August 2, 2017	85 days		Donald Trump (2017–2021)
8		Christopher A. Wray	August 2, 2017	January 19, 2025	7 years, 171 days		Donald Trump (2017–2021)
8		Christopher A. Wray	August 2, 2017	January 19, 2025	7 years, 171 days		Joe Biden (2021–2025)
–		Paul Abbate; Acting	January 19, 2025	January 20, 2025	1 day		Joe Biden (2021–2025)
–		Brian Driscoll; Acting	January 20, 2025	February 21, 2025	32 days		Donald Trump (2025–present)
9		Kash Patel	February 21, 2025	Incumbent	1 year, 235 days		Donald Trump (2025–present)

== Line of succession ==
The line of succession for the director of the FBI is as follows:

1. Deputy Director of the Federal Bureau of Investigation
2. Associate Deputy Director of the Federal Bureau of Investigation
3. Executive Assistant Director of the National Security Branch
4. Executive Assistant Director for Criminal, Cyber, Response and Services, Houston, TX
5. Assistant Director of Counterterrorism Division
6. Assistant Director of Counterintelligence Division
7. Assistant Director, Washington Field Office
8. Assistant Director, New York Field Office
9. Assistant Director, Los Angeles Field Office

== Dismissals ==
Since the office's inception, only two directors have been dismissed: William S. Sessions by President Bill Clinton in 1993, and James Comey by President Donald Trump in 2017.

=== William S. Sessions ===
Just before Bill Clinton was inaugurated as the 42nd president of the United States on January 20, 1993, allegations of ethical improprieties were made against Sessions. A report by outgoing Attorney General William P. Barr presented to the Justice Department that month by the Office of Professional Responsibility included criticisms that he had used an FBI plane to travel to visit his daughter on several occasions, and had a security system installed in his home at government expense. Janet Reno, the 78th Attorney General of the United States, announced that Sessions had exhibited "serious deficiencies in judgment."

Although Sessions denied that he had acted improperly, he was pressured to resign in early July, with some suggesting that President Clinton was giving Sessions the chance to step down in a dignified manner. Sessions refused, saying that he had done nothing wrong, and insisted on staying in office until his successor was confirmed. As a result, President Clinton dismissed Sessions on July 19, 1993, five and a half years into a ten-year term. Clinton's public explanation was that there had been a loss of confidence in Sessions' leadership, and then-Attorney General Reno recommended the dismissal.

Clinton nominated Louis Freeh to be FBI Director on July 20. Then-FBI deputy director Floyd I. Clarke, who Sessions suggested had led a coup to force his removal, served as acting director until September 1, 1993, when Freeh was sworn in.

=== James Comey ===
On May 9, 2017, President Trump dismissed Comey after the recommendation of United States Attorney General Jeff Sessions and Deputy Attorney General Rod Rosenstein. Rosenstein's memorandum to Sessions objected to Comey's conduct in the investigation into Hillary Clinton's emails. This was contradicted by multiple unnamed sources to news outlets, who said that Trump and high-level officials personally asked for Comey to be fired. Comey was fired after he asked for more money for the investigations into Russian interference in the 2016 United States elections. Many members of Congress, mostly Democrats, expressed concern over the firing and argued that it would put the integrity of the investigation into jeopardy.

Comey's termination was immediately controversial, even being characterized as corrupt by news commentators. It was compared, by the aforementioned news outlets, to the Saturday Night Massacre, President Richard Nixon's termination of special prosecutor Archibald Cox, who had been investigating the Watergate scandal, and to the firing of Acting Attorney General Sally Yates in January 2017.

In the dismissal letter Trump stated that Comey had asserted "on three separate occasions that I am not under investigation" which was later confirmed by Comey to the Senate while under oath. This is disputed by reporting from multiple news agencies with multiple sources. According to the reporting, Trump had been openly talking about firing Comey for at least a week before his dismissal. Trump and Democratic leaders had long questioned Comey's judgment. Moreover, Trump was angry that Comey would not support his claim that President Barack Obama had his campaign offices wiretapped, was frustrated when Comey revealed in Senate testimony the breadth of the counterintelligence investigation into Russia's effort to sway the 2016 U.S. presidential election and that Comey was giving too much attention to the Russia probe and not to internal leaks within the government. On May 8, 2017, he gave Attorney General Jeff Sessions and Deputy Attorney General Rosenstein a directive to explain in writing a case against Comey. That directive was forwarded to Trump as a recommendation to dismiss Comey the following day, which Trump did.

Comey first learned of his termination from television news reports that flashed on screen while he was delivering a speech to agents at the Los Angeles Field Office. Sources said he was surprised and caught off guard by the termination. Comey immediately departed for Washington, D.C., and was forced to cancel his scheduled speech that night at an FBI recruitment event at the Directors Guild of America in Hollywood.

In the absence of a Senate-confirmed FBI director, Deputy Director Andrew McCabe automatically became the acting director, serving until the confirmation of Christopher Wray.

== See also ==
- Chief, IRS Criminal Investigation
- Director of the Central Intelligence Agency
- Director of the United States Marshals Service
- Director of the United States Secret Service
- Federal law enforcement in the United States
