= List of Anderson University (Indiana) alumni =

This list of Anderson University (Indiana) alumni includes graduates, non-graduate former students and current students of Anderson Bible Training School, Anderson College and Theological Seminary, Anderson College, and/or Anderson University in Anderson, Indiana. Anderson University is a private Christian liberal arts university affiliated with the Church of God (Anderson). Established in 1917 as the Anderson Bible Training School, the institution subsequently changed its name to Anderson College and Theological Seminary, then to Anderson College, and finally to Anderson University.

== Academia ==
Name	Class year	Notability	Reference(s)
Dr. James L. Edwards		Past president of Anderson University and the Anderson School of Theology	
Kevin T. Pitts	1988	Chief research officer at Fermilab National Accelerator Laboratory	

== Government, law, and public policy ==
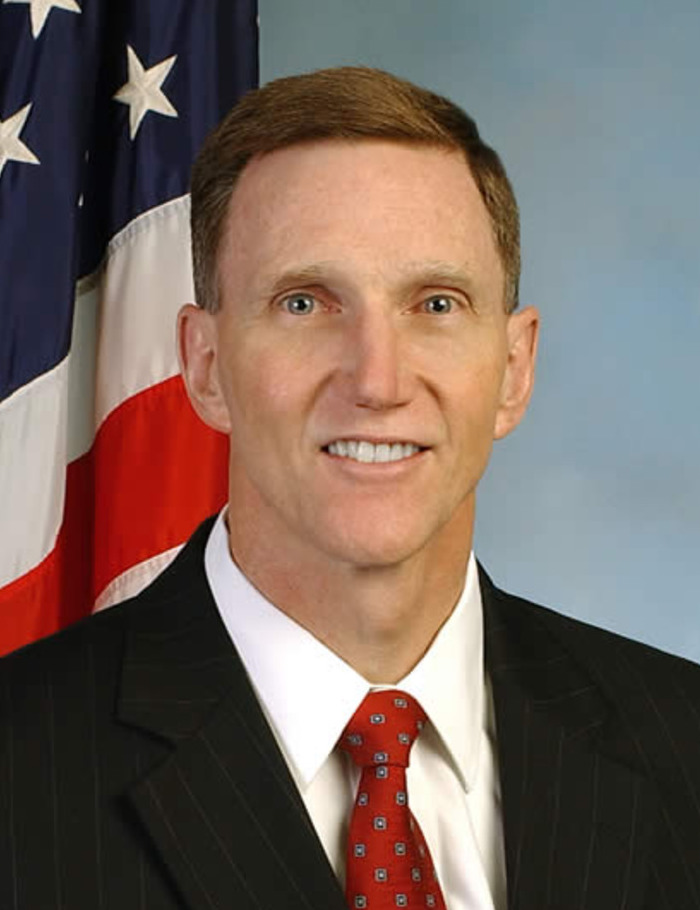
John Pistole, director of the TSA

Name	Class year	Notability	Reference(s)
John Pistole		Former president of Anderson University; former director of the Transportation Security Administration; former deputy director of the Federal Bureau of Investigation	

== Entertainment ==
=== Professional athletics ===
Name	Class year	Notability	Reference(s)
Carl Erskine		Major League Baseball pitcher; coached at then Anderson College for 12 years, including four championships	
Gary Gerould		Radio play-by-play announcer for the Sacramento Kings	

=== Music ===
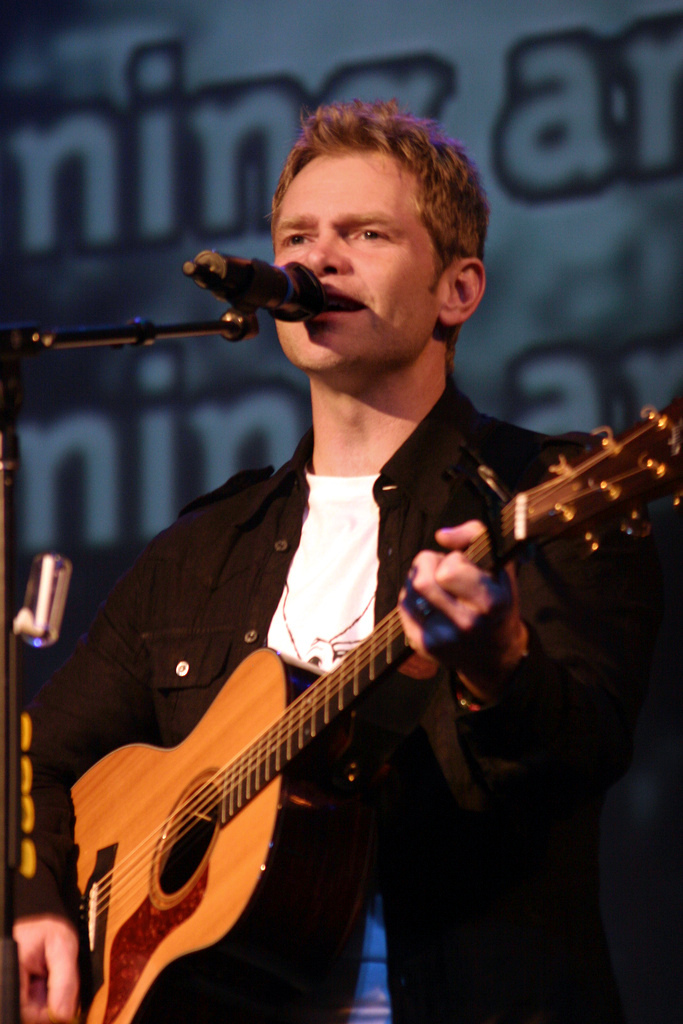
Christian singer/songwriter Steven Curtis Chapman

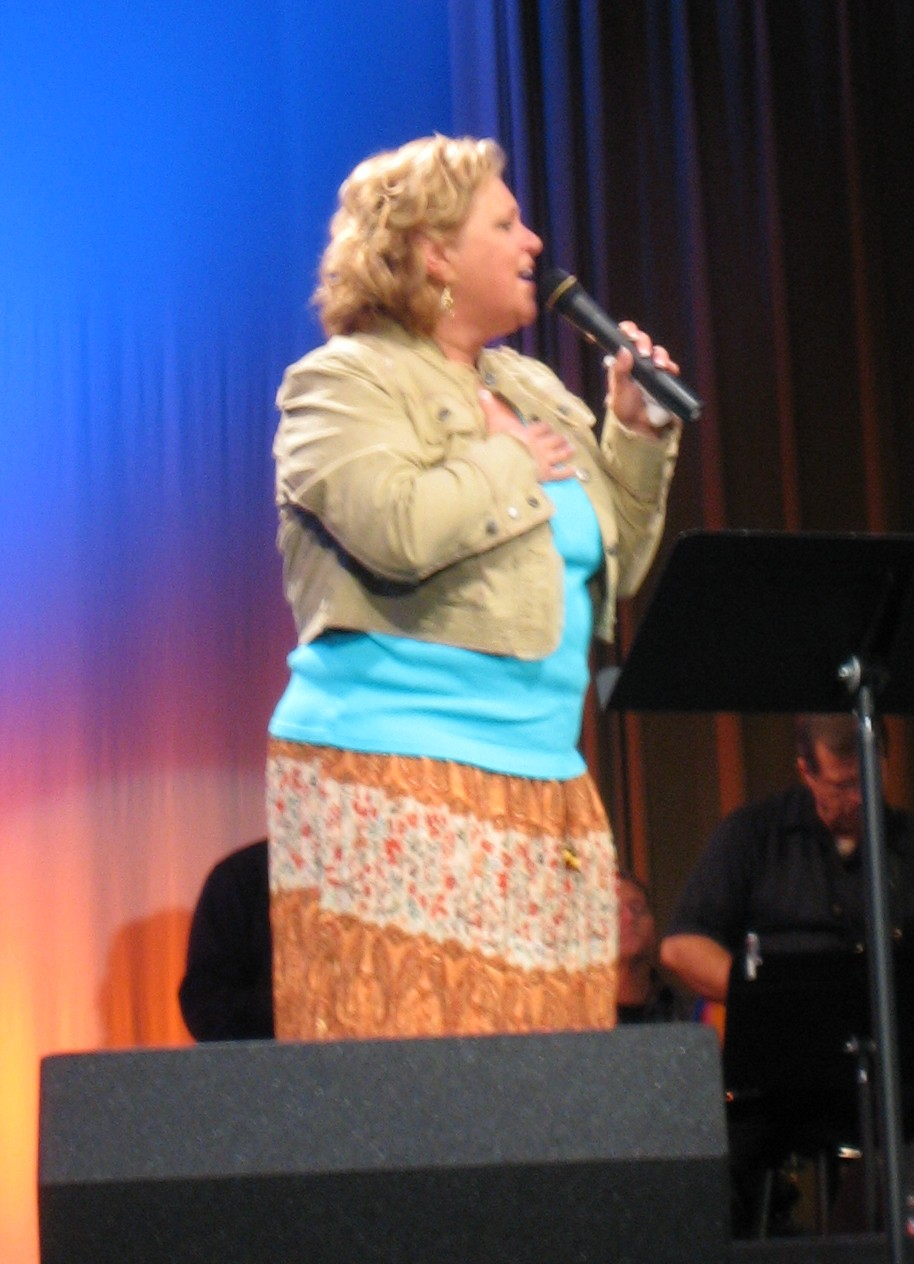
Singer Sandi Patty performs on April 14, 2006

Name	Class year	Notability	Reference(s)
Lawrence Brownlee	1996	Professional opera singer	
Steven Curtis Chapman	1984	Christian singer/songwriter	
David Frey	2005	Christian singer and front man of Sidewalk Prophets	
Bill Gaither	1959	Christian singer/songwriter	
Gloria Gaither	1963	Christian singer/songwriter	
Ben McDonald	2005	Christian musician and former rhythm guitarist for Sidewalk Prophets	
Jon McLaughlin	2005	Singer/songwriter	
Doug Oldham	1952	Gospel Hall of Fame inductee	
Jeff Owens	2004	Christian lead guitarist for Tenth Avenue North	
Sandi Patty	1974	Christian singer, Grammy Award winner	

=== Film and theatre ===
Name	Class year	Notability	Reference(s)
Cory Edwards	1990	Creator, director, writer, and voice of "Twitchy" in the 2005 animated movie Hoodwinked	
Todd Edwards	1994	Creator, writer, co-producer, and co-director of the 2005 animated movie Hoodwinked	
Katie Hooten	1996	Assistant Production Manager for Walt Disney Feature Animation; on the production team for Hoodwinked	
Lynelle Johnson	1996	Singer, dancer, and stage actress	
Preston Stutzman	1992	On the production team for Hoodwinked	

=== Video games ===
Name	Class year	Notability	Reference(s)
Jane Jensen	c. 1984	Fiction author; creator of the Gabriel Knight series of video games	
