= Robert Mueller =

American civil servant and attorney (1944–2026)

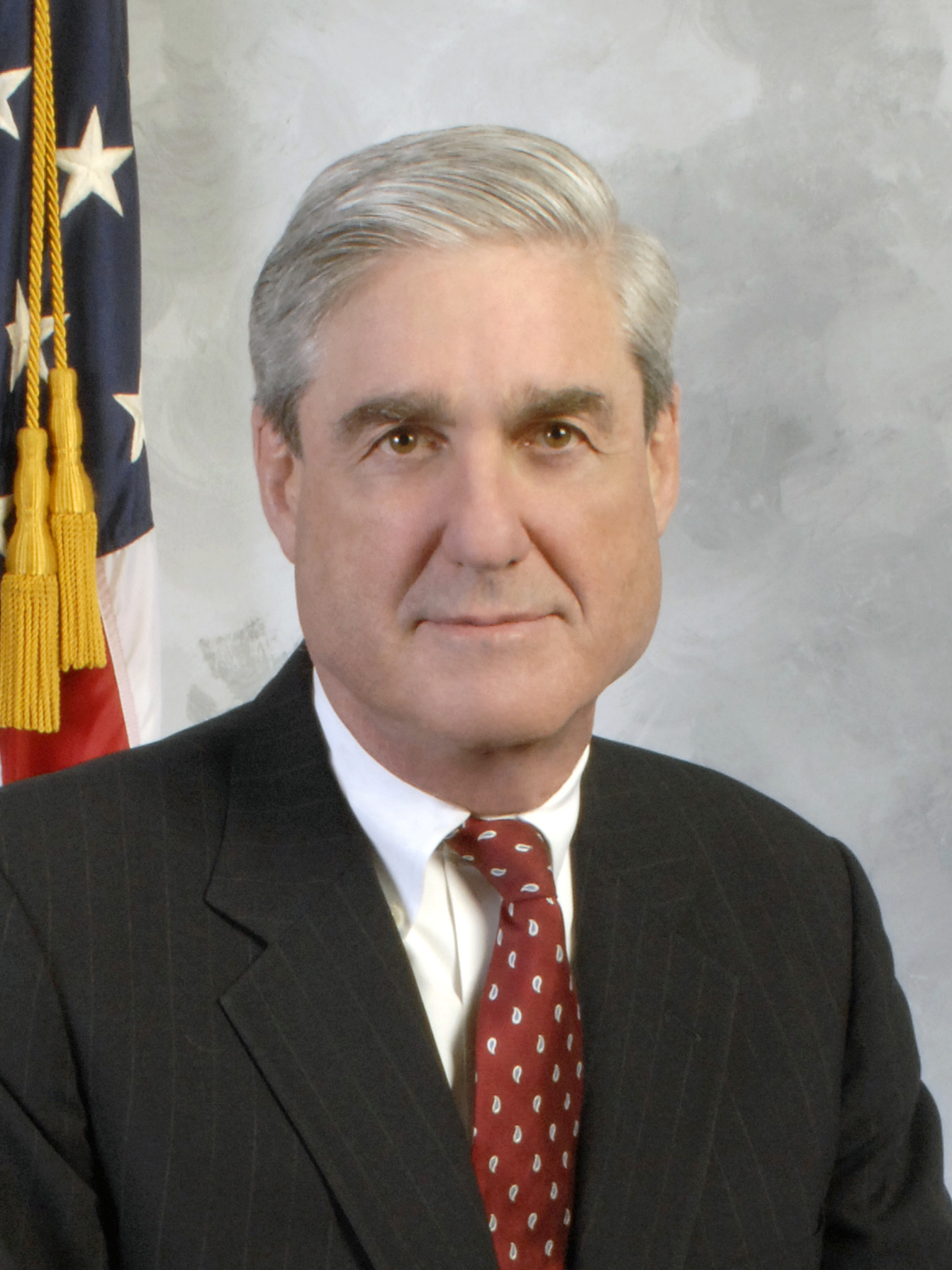
- Official portrait, 2011

Special Counsel for the United States Department of Justice
- In office May 17, 2017 – May 29, 2019
- Appointed by: Rod Rosenstein
- Preceded by: Position established
- Succeeded by: Position abolished

6th Director of the Federal Bureau of Investigation
- In office September 4, 2001 – September 4, 2013
- President: George W. Bush; Barack Obama
- Deputy: Thomas J. Pickard; Bruce J. Gebhardt; John S. Pistole; Timothy P. Murphy; Sean M. Joyce
- Preceded by: Thomas J. Pickard (acting)
- Succeeded by: James Comey

United States Deputy Attorney General
- Acting; January 20, 2001 – May 10, 2001
- President: George W. Bush
- Preceded by: Eric Holder
- Succeeded by: Larry Thompson

United States Attorney for the Northern District of California
- In office August 1998 – August 2001
- President: Bill Clinton; George W. Bush
- Preceded by: Michael Yamaguchi
- Succeeded by: Kevin V. Ryan

United States Assistant Attorney General for the Criminal Division
- In office August 1990 – January 1993
- President: George H. W. Bush
- Preceded by: Edward Dennis
- Succeeded by: Jo Ann Harris

United States Attorney for the District of Massachusetts
- Acting; October 10, 1986 – April 6, 1987
- President: Ronald Reagan
- Preceded by: Bill Weld
- Succeeded by: Frank L. McNamara Jr.

Personal details
- Born: Robert Swan Mueller III; August 7, 1944 New York City, U.S.
- Died: March 20, 2026 (aged 81) Charlottesville, Virginia, U.S.
- Resting place: Druid Ridge Cemetery
- Party: Republican
- Spouse: Ann Cabell Standish (m. 1966)
- Children: 2
- Education: Princeton University (BA); New York University (MA); University of Virginia (JD)

Military service
- Allegiance: United States
- Branch/service: United States Marine Corps
- Years of service: 1968–1971
- Rank: Captain
- Unit: H Company, 2nd Battalion, 4th Marines, 3rd Marine Division
- Battles/wars: Vietnam War; Operation Scotland II
- Awards: Bronze Star Medal with "V" device; Purple Heart; Navy Commendation Medal; South Vietnam Gallantry Cross
- Robert Mueller's voice Mueller, as FBI director, testifies before the Senate Judiciary Committee on reauthorizing portions of the Patriot Act. Recorded April 5, 2005

Robert Swan Mueller III (/ˈmʌlər/; August 7, 1944 – March 20, 2026) was an American lawyer who served as the sixth director of the Federal Bureau of Investigation (FBI) from 2001 to 2013.

A graduate of Princeton University and New York University, Mueller served as a U.S. Marine Corps officer during the Vietnam War, receiving a Bronze Star for heroism and a Purple Heart. He later attended the University of Virginia School of Law. Mueller was a registered Republican in Washington, D.C., and was appointed or reappointed to Senate-confirmed positions by presidents George H. W. Bush, Bill Clinton, George W. Bush, and Barack Obama.

Mueller worked in both government and private practice. He served as an Assistant U.S. attorney, a U.S. attorney, the U.S. assistant attorney general for the U.S. Department of Justice Criminal Division, a homicide prosecutor in the U.S. District Court for the District of Columbia, acting U.S. deputy attorney general, a partner at the Washington D.C. law firm WilmerHale, and director of the FBI. He was the only FBI director permitted by Congress to serve more than the statutory 10‑year term limit since the death of J. Edgar Hoover in 1972, receiving a special two‑year extension.

In 2017, Mueller was appointed special counsel to oversee the investigation into Russian interference in the 2016 U.S. presidential election and related matters. He submitted his report in 2019, after which the Office of the Special Counsel was closed and Mueller resigned.

== Early life and education ==
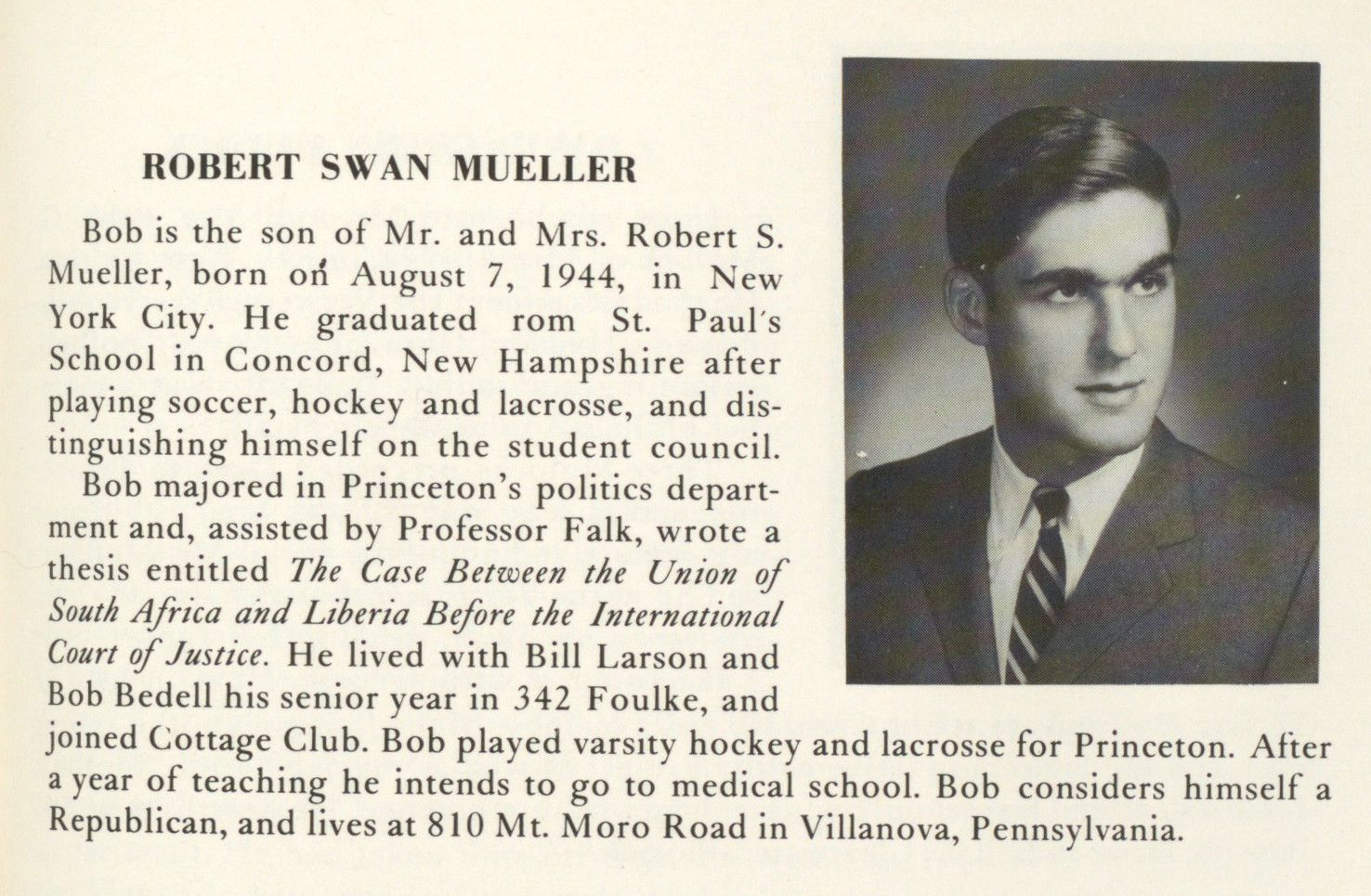
Mueller in the Princeton University yearbook, 1966

Robert Swan Mueller III was born on August 7, 1944, at Doctors Hospital in Manhattan, New York City, the first child of Alice C. Truesdale (1920–2007) and Robert Swan Mueller Jr. (1916–2007). He had four younger sisters: Susan, Sandra, Joan, and Patricia. His father, an executive with DuPont, had served as a U.S. Navy officer in the Atlantic and Mediterranean theaters during World War II. He studied psychology at Princeton University and played varsity lacrosse.

Mueller was of German, English, and Scottish descent. His paternal great-grandfather, Gustave A. Mueller, was a prominent physician in Pittsburgh; Gustave's father, August C. E. Müller, immigrated to the United States in 1855 from the Province of Pomerania in the Kingdom of Prussia, a region whose historical boundaries later formed parts of Poland and northeastern Germany. On his mother's side, Mueller was a great-grandson of railroad executive William Truesdale.

Mueller grew up in Princeton, New Jersey, and attended Princeton Country Day School. After eighth grade, his family moved to Philadelphia, while he enrolled at St. Paul's School in Concord, New Hampshire. At St. Paul's, he captained the soccer, hockey, and lacrosse teams and received the Gordon Medal as the school's top athlete in 1962. One of his lacrosse teammates and classmates was future U.S. Massachusetts Senator and Secretary of State John Kerry.

After graduating from St. Paul's, Mueller attended Princeton University, where he continued to play lacrosse and earned a Bachelor of Arts in Politics in 1966. His senior thesis was titled "Acceptance of Jurisdiction in the South West Africa Cases". He was a member of University Cottage Club. Mueller received a Master of Arts in International Relations from New York University in 1967. In 1968, he joined the U.S. Marine Corps. After completing his military service, Mueller attended the University of Virginia School of Law, where he served on the Virginia Law Review and earned a Juris Doctor in 1973.

== United States Marine Corps service ==
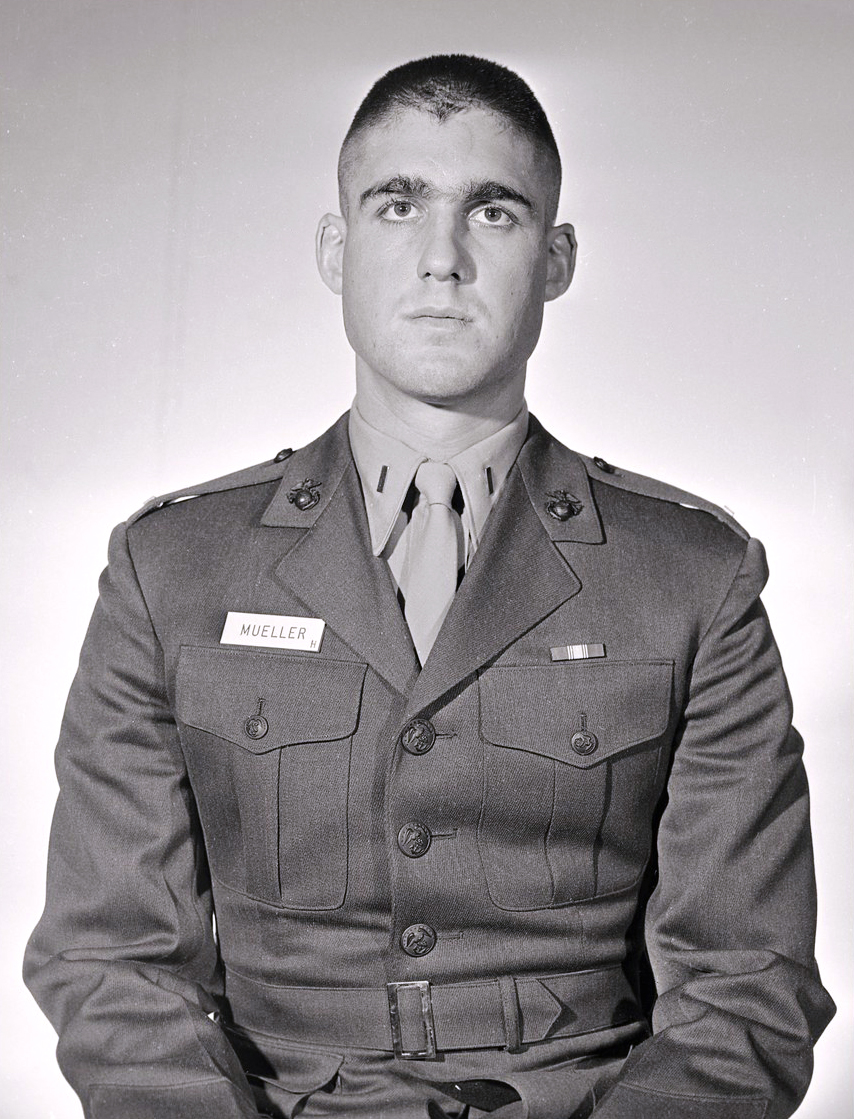
Mueller as a Marine lieutenant

Mueller cited the combat death of his Princeton lacrosse teammate David Spencer Hackett in the Vietnam War as an influence on his decision to pursue military service. Of his classmate, Mueller said, "One of the reasons I went into the Marine Corps was because we lost a very good friend, a Marine in Vietnam, who was a year ahead of me at Princeton. There were a number of us who felt we should follow his example and at least go into the service. And it flows from there." Hackett, a Marine Corps first lieutenant in the infantry, was killed in 1967 in Quảng Trị province by small arms fire.

After waiting a year for a knee injury to heal, Mueller was accepted for officer training in the U.S. Marine Corps in 1968. He attended training at Parris Island, Officer Candidate School, Ranger School, and Jump School. He later said that he considered Ranger School the most valuable because it "more than anything teaches you about how you react with no sleep and nothing to eat."

In the summer of 1968, Mueller was deployed to South Vietnam, where he served as a rifle platoon leader with Second Platoon, H Company, 2nd Battalion, 4th Marines, 3rd Marine Division. On December 11, 1968, during an engagement in Operation Scotland II, he earned the Bronze Star with "V" device for combat valor after rescuing a wounded Marine under enemy fire during an ambush in which half of his platoon became casualties. In April 1969, he was wounded in the thigh by enemy gunfire, recovered, and returned to lead his platoon until June 1969.

For his service in the Vietnam War, Mueller's military decorations and awards included the Bronze Star Medal with "V" device, the Purple Heart, two Navy and Marine Corps Commendation Medals with Combat "V", the Combat Action Ribbon, the National Defense Service Medal, the Vietnam Service Medal with four service stars, the Republic of Vietnam Gallantry Cross, the Republic of Vietnam Campaign Medal, and the Parachutist Badge.

After recuperating at a field hospital near Da Nang, Mueller served as aide-de-camp to the commanding general of the 3rd Marine Division, then–Major General William K. Jones. One report stated that he "significantly contributed to the rapport" Jones maintained with other officers. Mueller had originally considered a career in the Marine Corps, but later explained that he found non-combat life in the service unexciting. After returning from South Vietnam, he was briefly stationed at Henderson Hall before leaving active-duty service in August 1970 as a captain.

Reflecting on his service, Mueller said, "I consider myself exceptionally lucky to have made it out of Vietnam. There were many—many—who did not. And perhaps because I did survive Vietnam, I have always felt compelled to contribute." In 2009, he told a writer that despite his other accomplishments, he remained "most proud the Marine Corps deemed me worthy of leading other Marines."

== Career ==
=== Private practice and Department of Justice ===
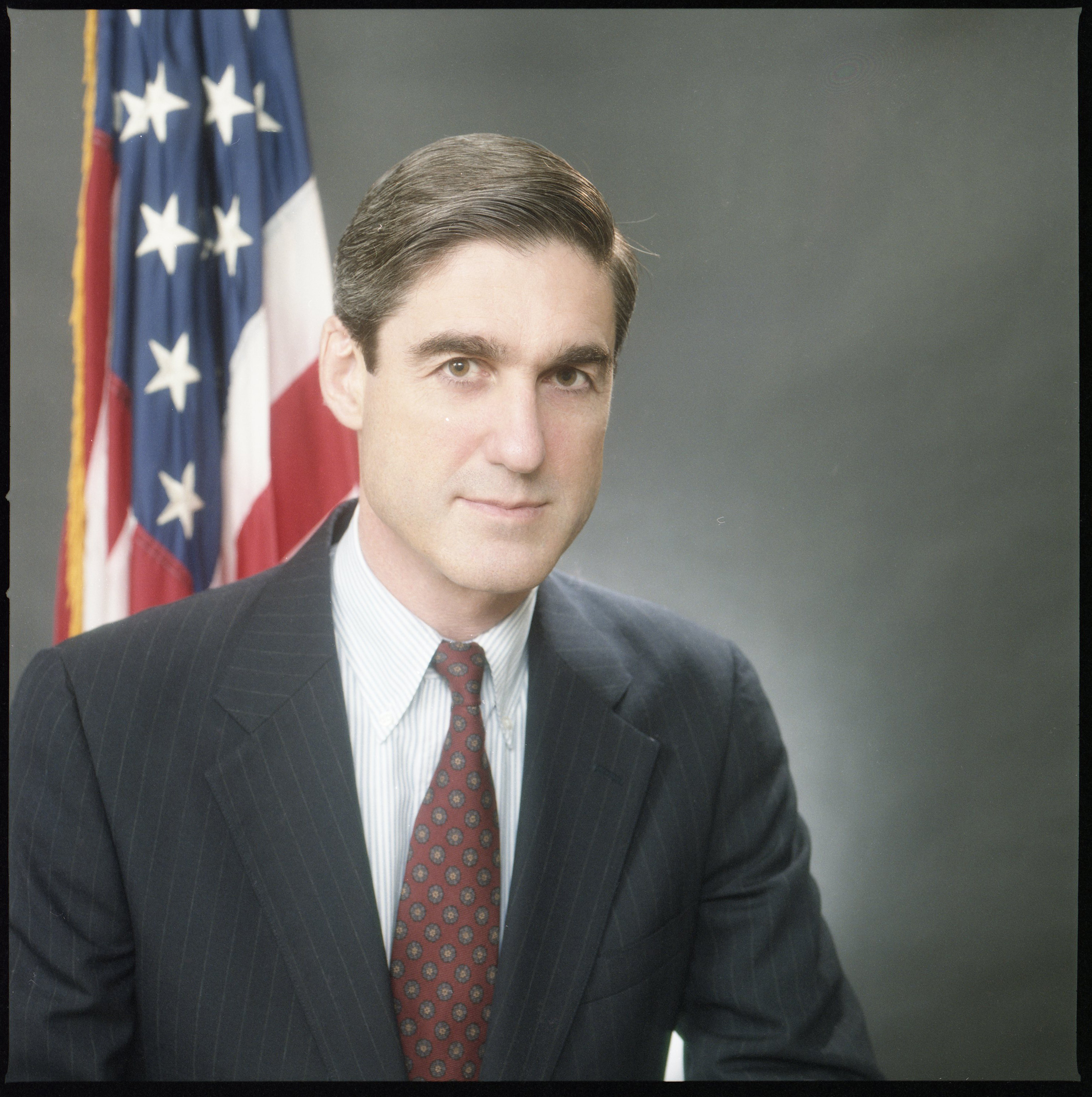
Mueller as Assistant Attorney General for the Criminal Division, 1992

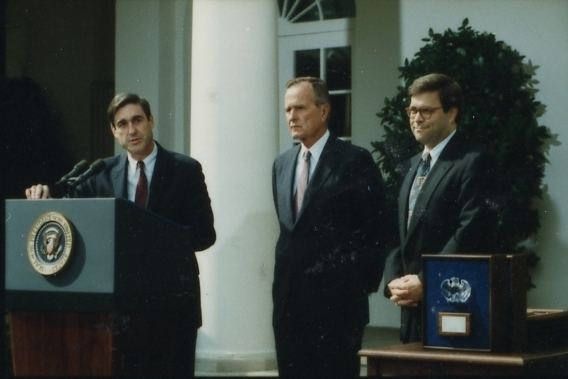
Mueller with President George H. W. Bush and William Barr in 1991

After receiving his Juris Doctor in 1973 from the University of Virginia School of Law, Mueller worked as a litigator at the firm Pillsbury, Madison and Sutro in San Francisco until 1976. He then served for 12 years in U.S. Attorney offices. He first worked in the office of the U.S. Attorney for the Northern District of California in San Francisco, where he rose to become chief of the criminal division. In 1982, he moved to Boston to serve as an Assistant United States Attorney of the U.S. Attorney for Massachusetts, where he investigated and prosecuted major financial fraud, terrorism, and public corruption cases, as well as narcotics conspiracies and international money‑laundering operations.

After serving as a partner at the Boston law firm Hill and Barlow, Mueller returned to government service. In 1989, he served in the U.S. Department of Justice as an assistant to Attorney General Dick Thornburgh and as acting deputy attorney general. James Baker, who worked with him on national security matters, said Mueller had "an appreciation for the Constitution and the rule of law".

In 1990, Mueller became the U.S. Assistant Attorney General in charge of the U.S. Department of Justice Criminal Division. During his tenure, he oversaw prosecutions including those of Panamanian leader Manuel Noriega, the Pan Am Flight 103 (Lockerbie bombing) case, and Gambino crime family boss John Gotti.

In 1991, Mueller publicly stated that the government had been investigating the Bank of Credit and Commerce International (BCCI) since 1986, an unusually visible disclosure for an ongoing case. That same year, he was elected a fellow of the American College of Trial Lawyers. In 1993, Mueller became a partner at Hale and Dorr, specializing in white-collar crime litigation. He returned to public service in 1995 as a senior litigator in the homicide section of the United States Attorney's Office for the District of Columbia. In 1998, Mueller was appointed U.S. Attorney for the Northern District of California, a position he held until 2001.

=== Federal Bureau of Investigation ===
==== Bush administration ====
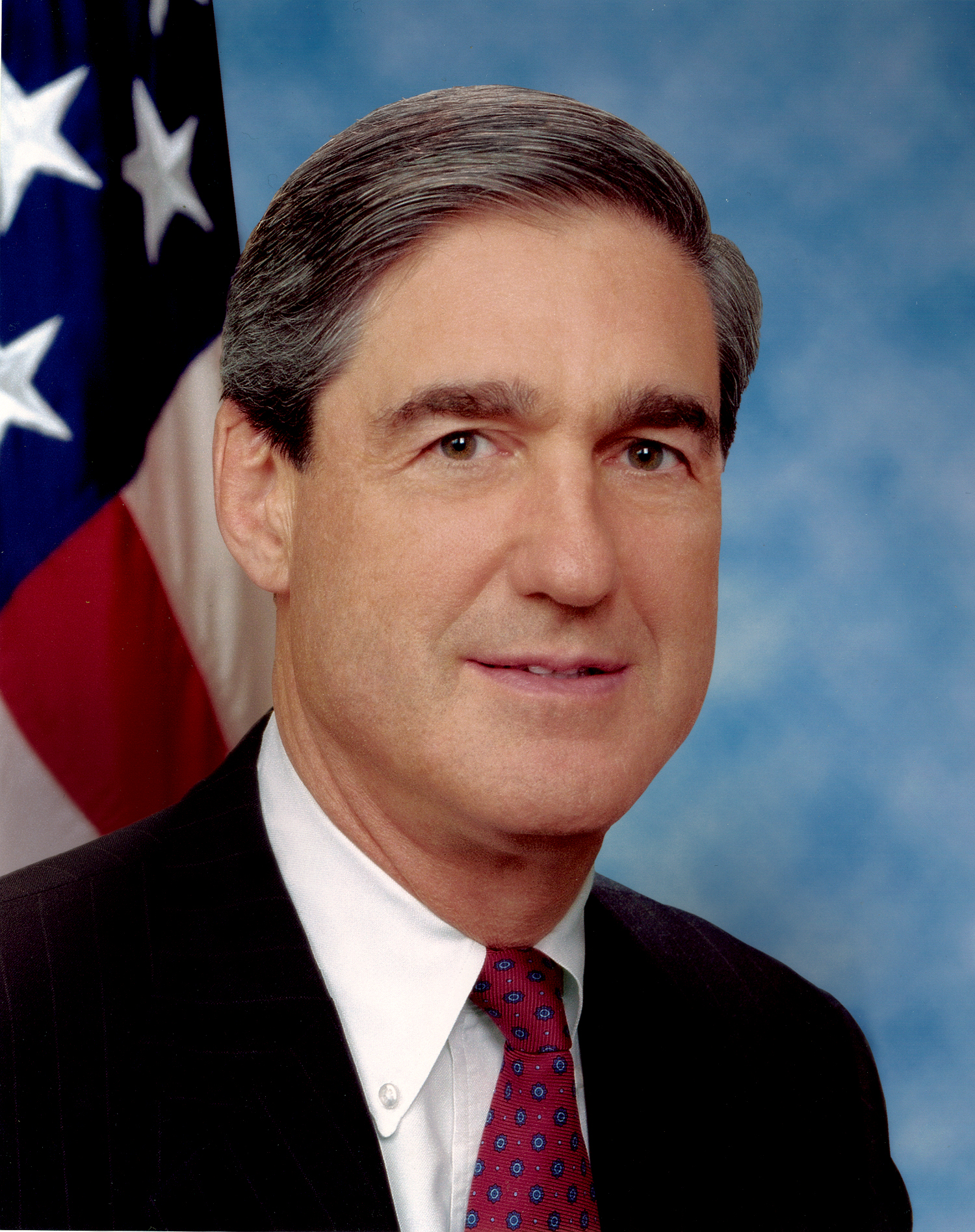
Official portrait, c. 2001

President George W. Bush nominated Mueller for the position of FBI director on July 5, 2001. He and two other candidates, Washington lawyer George J. Terwilliger III and Chicago prosecutor and white-collar crime defense lawyer Dan Webb, were considered for the role, but Mueller, described at the time as a conservative Republican, was widely viewed as the front-runner. Terwilliger and Webb both withdrew from consideration in mid-June, and confirmation hearings for Mueller before the Senate Judiciary Committee were scheduled for July 30, only three days before his prostate cancer surgery. The Senate unanimously confirmed Mueller as FBI director on August 2, 2001, voting 98–0. He had previously served as acting deputy attorney general of the Department of Justice (DOJ) for several months before officially assuming the FBI directorship on September 4, 2001, one week before the September 11 attacks.. Mueller oversaw numerous Foreign Intelligence Surveillance Court hearings during which suspects were presented as potential perpetrators or leaders of the attacks.

On February 11, 2003, one month before the U.S.-led invasion of Iraq, Mueller testified before the Senate Select Committee on Intelligence. He stated that "[s]even countries designated as state sponsors of terrorism—Iran, Iraq, Syria, Sudan, Libya, Cuba, and North Korea—remain active in the United States and continue to support terrorist groups that have targeted Americans. As Director Tenet has pointed out, Secretary Powell presented evidence last week that Baghdad has failed to disarm its weapons of mass destruction, willfully attempting to evade and deceive the international community. Our particular concern is that Saddam Hussein may supply terrorists with biological, chemical or radiological material." That same month, FBI Special Agent Coleen Rowley wrote an open letter to Mueller warning that "the bureau will [not] be able to stem the flood of terrorism that will likely head our way in the wake of an attack on Iraq" and encouraged Mueller to "share [her concerns] with the President and Attorney General."

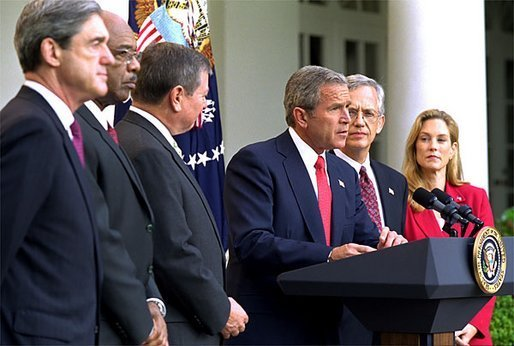
Mueller with President George W. Bush and Attorney General John Ashcroft, August 6, 2002

On March 10, 2004, while Attorney General John Ashcroft was hospitalized for gallbladder surgery, Deputy attorney general James Comey received a call from Ashcroft's wife informing him that White House Chief of Staff Andrew Card and White House Counsel Alberto Gonzales were on their way to Ashcroft's bedside to seek his approval for renewing a warrantless wiretapping program under the Terrorist Surveillance Program, which the Department of Justice had ruled unconstitutional. Ashcroft refused to sign. The following day, the White House renewed the program anyway. Mueller and Comey then threatened to resign. On March 12, 2004, after private meetings with Mueller and Comey at the White House, the president agreed to modify the program to address the concerns raised by Mueller, Ashcroft, and Comey. Mueller was inducted into the Ranger Hall of Fame in 2004.

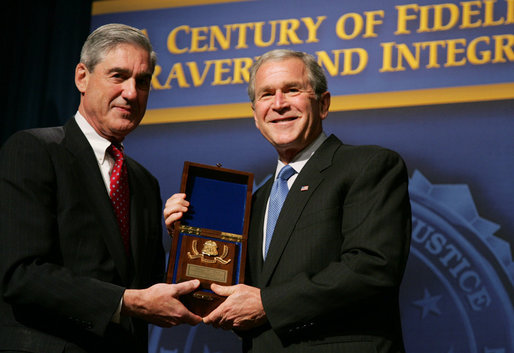
Mueller presented an honorary FBI Special Agent credential to President Bush in 2008

As director, Mueller barred FBI personnel from participating in enhanced interrogations conducted by the CIA. At a dinner, he defended attorney, Thomas Wilner, who had been criticized for representing Kuwaiti detainees, standing and raising a glass to say, "I toast Tom Wilner. He's doing what an American should." The White House pushed for more aggressive methods of pursuing and interrogating terrorism suspects. When Bush pressed Mueller to round up more suspects inside the United States, Mueller replied, "If they [suspects] don't commit a crime, it would be difficult to identify and isolate them." Vice President Dick Cheney objected, saying, "That's just not good enough. We're hearing this too much from the FBI."

==== Obama administration ====
In May 2011, President Barack Obama asked Mueller to continue as FBI director for two additional years beyond his normal 10‑year term, which would have expired on September 4, 2011. The Senate approved this request 100–0 on July 27, 2011. On September 4, 2013, Mueller was succeeded by James Comey. In June 2013, Mueller defended NSA surveillance programs in testimony before a House Judiciary Committee hearing. He said that surveillance programs could have "derailed" the September 11 attacks. Congressman John Conyers disagreed, saying, "I am not persuaded that that makes it OK to collect every call." Mueller also testified that the government's surveillance programs complied "in full with U.S. law and with basic rights guaranteed under the Constitution". He said, "We are taking all necessary steps to hold Edward Snowden responsible for these disclosures."

On June 19, 2017, in the case of Arar v. Ashcroft, Mueller, along with Ashcroft, former U.S. Immigration and Naturalization Service Commissioner James W. Ziglar, and others, was shielded from civil liability by the U.S. Supreme Court for post-9/11 detention of Muslims under policies implemented at the time.

=== Return to private sector ===
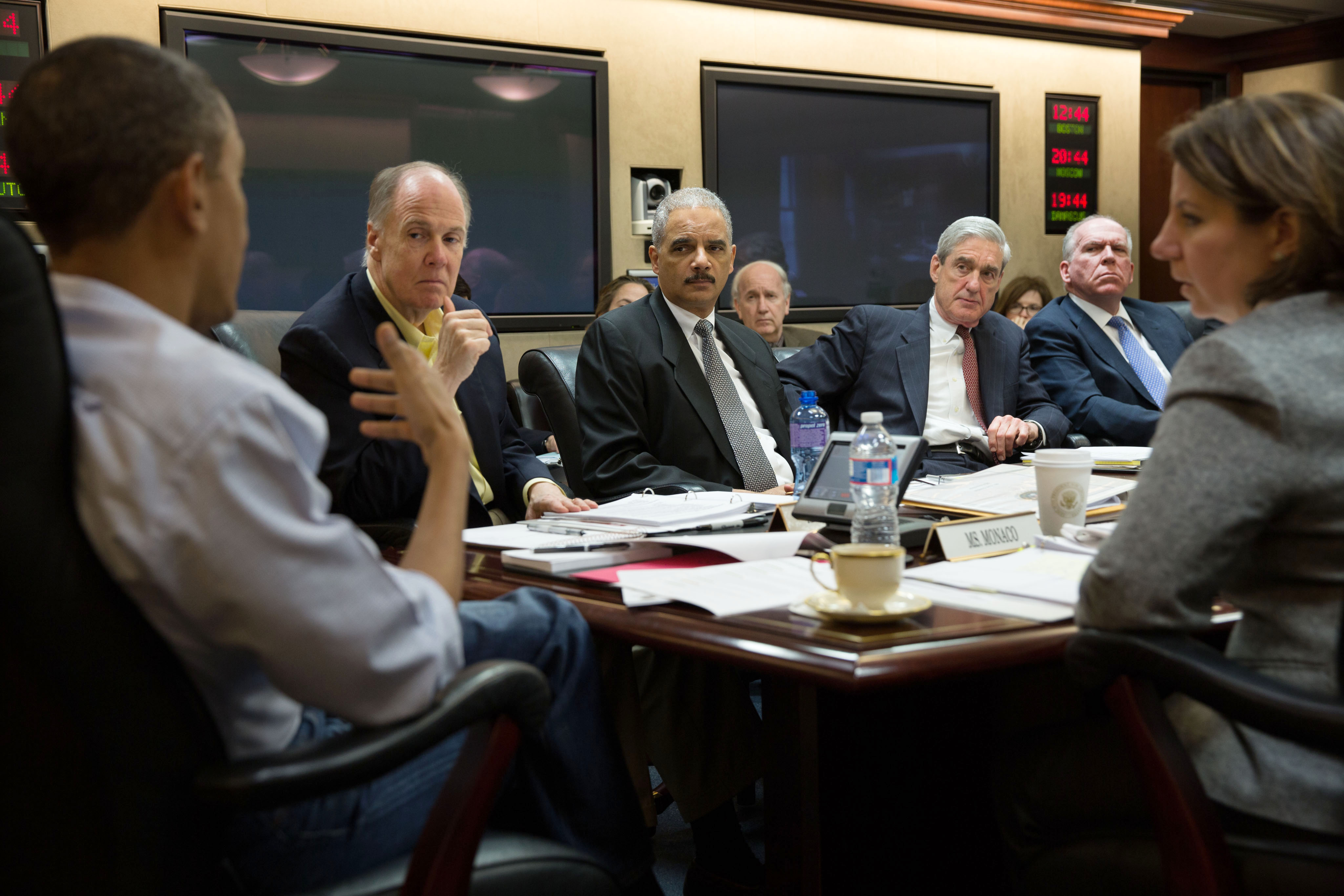
Mueller at the White House in April 2013, discussing the Boston Marathon bombing, with (from left) President Obama, National Security Advisor Thomas E. Donilon, Attorney General Eric Holder, Director of CIA John O. Brennan, and Lisa Monaco, Assistant to the President for Homeland Security and Counterterrorism

After leaving the FBI in 2013, Mueller served a one‑year term as consulting professor and the Arthur and Frank Payne distinguished lecturer at Stanford University, where he focused on issues related to computer security. In addition to his speaking and teaching roles, Mueller joined the law firm WilmerHale as a partner in its Washington office in 2014. Among other responsibilities at the firm, he oversaw the independent investigation into the NFL's conduct surrounding the video that appeared to show NFL player Ray Rice assaulting his fiancée. In January 2016, he was appointed as Settlement Master in U.S. consumer litigation over the Volkswagen emissions scandal; as of May 11, 2017, the scandal had resulted in $11.2 billion in customer settlements.

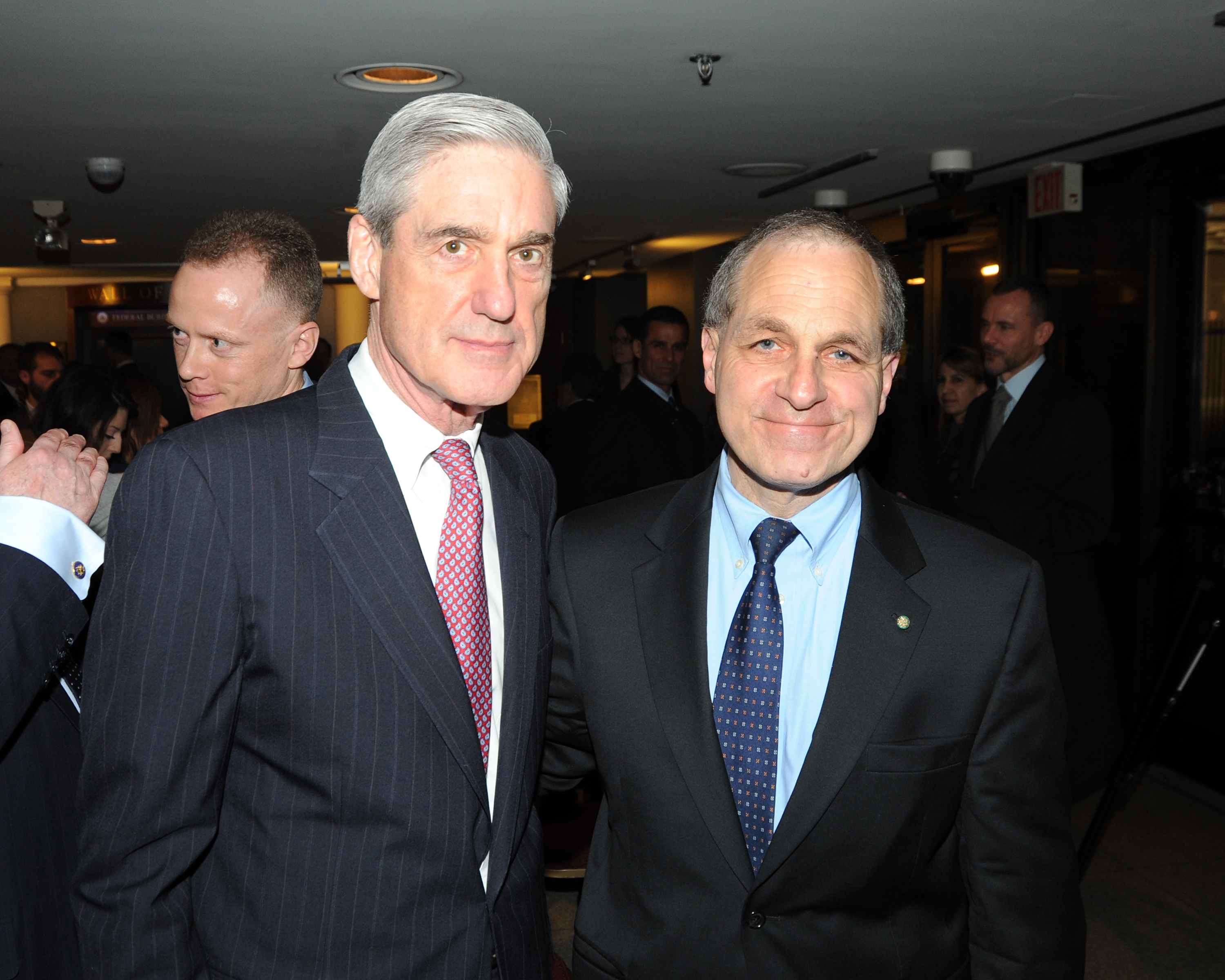
Mueller with his predecessor Louis Freeh in 2013

On October 19, 2016, Mueller began an external review of "security, personnel, and management processes and practices" at government contractor Booz Allen Hamilton after Harold T. Martin III was indicted for massive data theft from the National Security Agency. On April 6, 2017, he was appointed as special master for the disbursement of $850 million and $125 million for automakers and consumers, respectively, affected by rupture-prone Takata airbags.

Mueller received the 2016 Sylvanus Thayer Award for public service from the U.S. Military Academy. In June 2017, he received the Baker Award for intelligence and national security contributions from the nonprofit Intelligence and National Security Alliance. In October 2019, it was announced that Mueller, along with James L. Quarles and Aaron Zebley, would return to WilmerHale to resume private practice. On July 11, 2020, Mueller wrote an op-ed in The Washington Post stating that Roger Stone "remains a convicted felon, and rightly so" after the U.S. president granted Stone clemency, and he defended his office's work and the integrity of the investigation.

=== Special Counsel for the DoJ (2017–2019) ===
"Appointment of Special Counsel to Investigate Russian Interference in the 2016 United States Election and Related Matters", by then-Deputy Attorney General Rod Rosenstein

On May 16, 2017, Mueller met with President Donald Trump as a courtesy to provide perspectives on the FBI and input on considerations for hiring a new FBI director. This meeting was initially widely reported as an interview to serve again as FBI director. Trump raised the possibility of Mueller resuming the position; however, Mueller was ineligible to return due to statutory term limits, and he had no interest in resuming the role.

The next day, Deputy Attorney General Rod Rosenstein appointed Mueller to serve as special counsel for the U.S. Department of Justice. In this capacity, Mueller oversaw the investigation into "any links and/or coordination between the Russian government and individuals associated with the campaign of President Donald Trump, and any matters that arose or may arise directly from the investigation."

Mueller's appointment received immediate bipartisan support in Congress. Newt Gingrich, former Republican Speaker of the House of Representatives and a prominent conservative political commentator, stated via Twitter that Mueller was "a superb choice to be special counsel" and his reputation was "impeccable for honesty and integrity". Senator Chuck Schumer (D-NY) said, "Former Director Mueller is exactly the right kind of individual for this job. I now have significantly greater confidence that the investigation will follow the facts wherever they lead." Senator Rob Portman (R-OH) said that Mueller was "well qualified to oversee this probe". Some lawmakers alleged a conflict of interest. Representative Trent Franks (R-AZ), who had called for Mueller to step down, said in a statement to Fox News, "The federal code could not be clearer—Mueller is compromised by his apparent conflict of interest in being close with James Comey ... The appearance of a conflict is enough to put Mueller in violation of the code ... All of the revelations in recent weeks make the case stronger."

Upon his appointment as special counsel, Mueller and two colleagues—former FBI agent Aaron Zebley and former assistant special prosecutor on the Watergate Special Prosecution Force James L. Quarles III—resigned from WilmerHale. On May 23, 2017, Department of Justice ethics officials announced that Mueller had been declared ethically able to serve as special counsel. Peter Carr, spokesperson for the special counsel's office, told NBC News had taken an active role in managing the inquiry. In an interview with the Associated Press, Rosenstein said he would recuse himself from supervising Mueller if he became a subject of the investigation due to his role in the dismissal of James Comey.

On June 14, 2017, The Washington Post reported that Mueller's office was also investigating Trump personally for possible obstruction of justice in connection with the Russia probe. The report was questioned by Trump's attorney Jay Sekulow, who said on June 18 on NBC's Meet the Press, "The President is not and has not been under investigation for obstruction, period." Due to the central role of the Trump family in the campaign, the transition, and the White House, the President's son-in-law, Jared Kushner, was also reportedly under scrutiny by Mueller. Also in June, Trump allegedly ordered the firing of Mueller but backed down when then‑White House Counsel Don McGahn threatened to resign.

During a discussion about national security at the Aspen security conference on July 21, 2017, former CIA director John Brennan reaffirmed his support for Mueller and called on members of Congress to resist if Trump attempted to fire him. Brennan said it was "the obligation of some executive-branch officials to refuse to carry out some of these orders that, again, are inconsistent with what this country is all about." After Peter Strzok, an investigator for Mueller, was removed from the inquiry for alleged partiality, Senator Mark Warner, the Ranking Member of the Senate Select Committee on Intelligence, warned in a December 20, 2017, floor speech a potential constitutional crisis if the President fired Mueller. On June 22, 2018, Warner hosted a fundraising event for approximately 100 guests and was quoted as saying, "If you get me one more glass of wine, I'll tell you stuff only Bob Mueller and I know. If you think you've seen wild stuff so far, buckle up. It's going to be a wild couple of months."

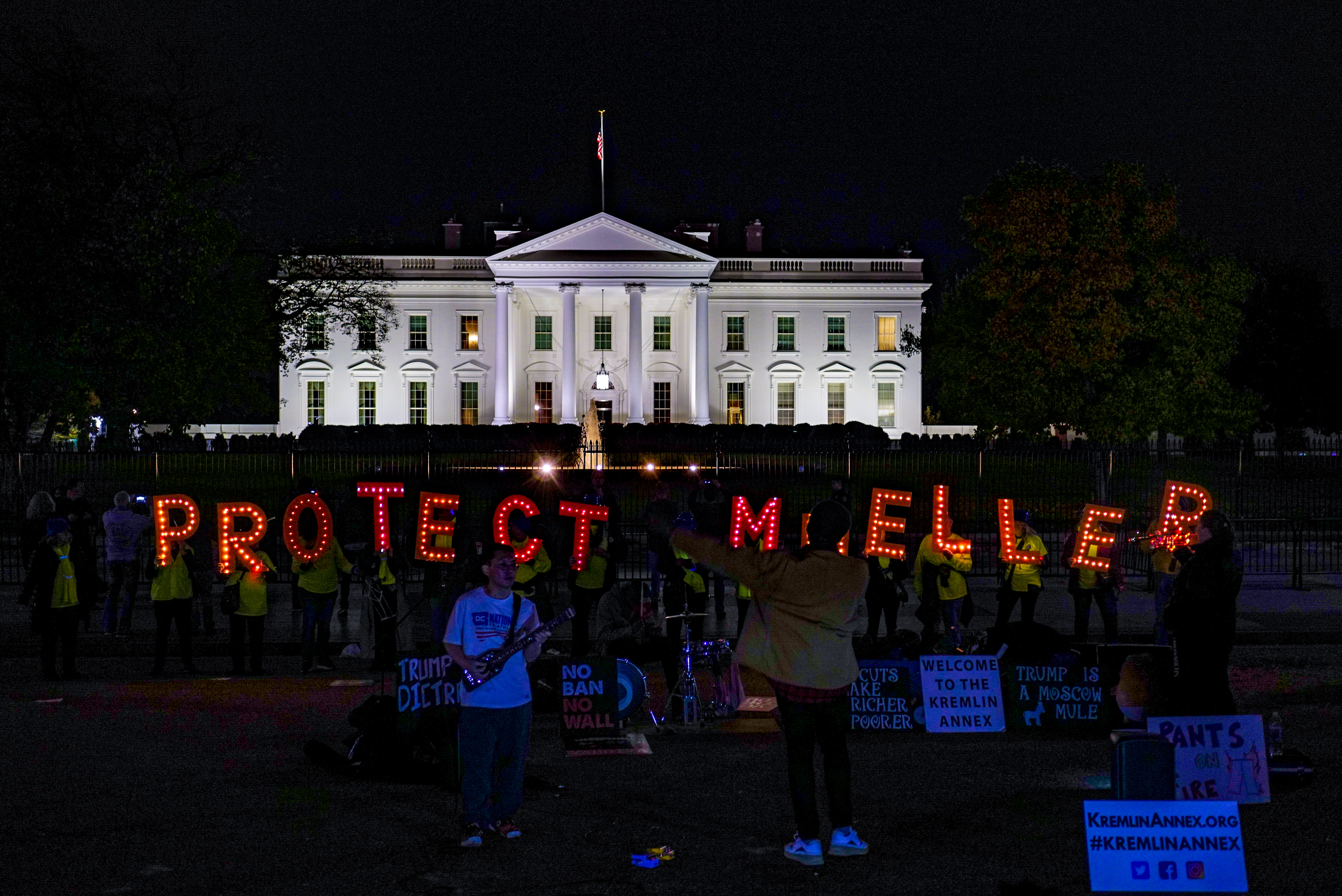
Protect Mueller protest in Washington, D.C., 2018

On October 30, 2017, Mueller filed charges against former Trump campaign chairman Paul Manafort and campaign co-chairman Rick Gates. The 12 charges included conspiracy to launder money, violations of the 1938 Foreign Agents Registration Act (FARA) for acting as unregistered agents of a foreign principal, false and misleading FARA statements, and conspiracy against the United States.

On December 1, 2017, Mueller reached a plea agreement with former national security adviser Michael Flynn, who pleaded guilty to giving false testimony to the FBI about his contacts with Russian ambassador Sergey Kislyak. As part of Flynn's negotiations, his son, Michael G. Flynn, was not expected to be charged, and Flynn was prepared to testify that high‑level officials on Trump's team directed him to make contact with Russian representatives. On February 16, 2018, Mueller indicted 13 Russian individuals and 3 Russian companies for attempting to deceive Americans into consuming Russian propaganda that targeted Democratic nominee Hillary Clinton, and later President-elect Donald Trump.

On February 20, 2018, Mueller charged attorney Alex van der Zwaan with making false statements in the Russia probe. On May 20, 2018, Trump criticized Mueller, tweeting that "the World's most expensive Witch Hunt has found nothing on Russia & me so now they are looking at the rest of the World!" Mueller also began investigating the August 2016 meeting between Donald Trump Jr. and an emissary for the crown princes of Saudi Arabia and the United Arab Emirates. The emissary offered help to the Trump presidential campaign. Mueller was additionally examining the campaign's possible ties to Turkey, Qatar, Israel, and the People's Republic of China. On December 18, 2018, The Washington Post reported on a Senate‑commissioned study concluding that Russian disinformation teams had targeted Mueller.

On March 22, 2019, Mueller concluded his investigation and submitted the special counsel's final report to Attorney General William Barr. A senior Department of Justice official said that the report did not recommend any new indictments. On March 24, Attorney General Barr submitted a summary of findings to the U.S. Congress, stating, "The Special Counsel's investigation did not find that the Trump campaign or anyone associated with it conspired or coordinated with Russia in its efforts to influence the 2016 U.S. presidential election." Mueller's report reportedly did not take a position on whether Trump committed obstruction of justice; Barr quoted Mueller as saying, "while this report does not conclude that the President committed a crime, it also does not exonerate him."

The Mueller report

On April 18, 2019, the Department of Justice released Report on the Investigation into Russian Interference in the 2016 Presidential Election, the special counsel's final report and its conclusions. On May 29, 2019, Mueller announced that he was retiring as special counsel and that the office would be shut down, and he spoke publicly about the report for the first time. Saying, "The report is my testimony", he indicated that he would have nothing to add beyond what was already written. On the subject of obstruction of justice, he said, "under long-standing Department [of Justice] policy, a president cannot be charged with a crime while he is in office." He repeated his official conclusion that the report neither accused nor exonerated the President, while adding that any potential wrongdoing by a president must be addressed by a "process other than the criminal justice system." Mueller also reaffirmed the involvement of Russian operatives in the 2016 Democratic National Committee email leak and their parallel efforts to influence American public opinion through social media. Referring to those actions, he stated that "there were multiple, systematic efforts to interfere in our election. That allegation deserves the attention of every American."

Mueller was initially scheduled to testify publicly before two House committees on July 17, 2019, with two hours allotted for questioning, but the hearing was postponed to July 24 and expanded to include a third hour. His testimony was expected to help inform the public and assist Democratic leadership in determining whether to pursue impeachment. Representative Jamie Raskin of Maryland said he would use visual aids, such as posters, to help explain the implications of the Mueller report. Republicans planned to question Mueller about the origins of the investigation.

On July 24, 2019, Mueller appeared before both congressional committees and was questioned by members of Congress. His testimony adhered to the guidelines he had previously stated would govern his public comments. Many of his responses were brief, sometimes limited to a single word. He said he was "not familiar" with Fusion GPS, the opposition research firm that commissioned the Steele dossier. He rejected claims that his investigation was a "witch hunt" or that it totally exonerated the President. He declined to answer questions outside the scope of his investigation but reiterated his concern about foreign interference in American elections. He noted that such interference was ongoing, that he expected it to expand to include other foreign governments in addition to Russia, and that he considered it a significant threat to the United States. According to the Nielsen Company, total viewership for the hearings was just under 13 million, significantly lower than other high‑profile hearings involving the Trump administration, such as those for Supreme Court nominee Brett Kavanaugh (20.4 million), former FBI director James Comey (19.5 million), and former Trump attorney Michael Cohen (15.8 million). The comparatively low ratings were attributed in part to the hearing taking place in July, a common vacation period, and months after the release of the Mueller report. Fox News Channel had the highest viewership, with 3.03 million viewers. In the aftermath, Mueller's remarks were variously distorted and misinterpreted to both defend and criticize the President. Some observers described his testimony as unusually hesitant or confusing.

In late September 2019, it was reported that Trump may have lied to Mueller about his knowledge of his campaign's contacts with WikiLeaks, based on grand jury redactions in the Mueller report. Political scientists William G. Howell and Terry M. Moe described Mueller's decision not to take a position on obstruction of justice—despite "compiling a mountain of incriminating evidence"—as "one of the strangest—and most consequential—moves in modern legal history". They argued that, "in refusing to draw legal conclusions from his evidence, Mueller simply didn't do his job ... because he didn't, he failed to carry out his duty to tell the American people what his investigation actually revealed about Trump's lawless behavior, and he failed to draw a bright line that would keep future presidents within legal bounds."

=== Retirement ===
In June 2021, the University of Virginia School of Law announced that Mueller would participate in a six‑session course titled "The Mueller Report and the Role of the Special Counsel", to be offered that fall. He taught the course alongside three colleagues from the special counsel investigation.

Mueller wrote the introduction to the book Interference: The Inside Story of Trump, Russia, and the Mueller Investigation, which the publisher Simon & Schuster announced in July 2024 would be released in September. Its authors are Aaron Zebley, James Quarles, and Andrew Goldstein, all of whom Mueller had recruited for the special counsel investigation.

== Personal life ==
Mueller met his future wife, Ann Cabell Standish, at a high school party when they were 17. Standish attended Miss Porter's School in Farmington, Connecticut, and Sarah Lawrence College, and later worked as a special-education teacher for children with learning disabilities. They married in September 1966 at St. Stephen's Episcopal Church in Sewickley, Pennsylvania. The couple had two daughters and three grandchildren. One of their daughters was born with spina bifida.

In 2001, Mueller's Senate confirmation hearings to lead the FBI were delayed for several months while he underwent treatment for prostate cancer. He had been diagnosed in the fall of 2000, and he postponed being sworn in as FBI director until receiving a favorable prognosis from his physician. Mueller was raised Presbyterian and later became an Episcopalian. He and William Barr, the attorney general who oversaw the final stage of Mueller's special counsel investigation, had known each other since the 1980s and were described as close friends. Mueller attended the weddings of two of Barr's daughters, and their wives participated in Bible study together.

=== Health and death ===
In August 2025, Mueller's family disclosed that he had been diagnosed with Parkinson's disease in 2021. The announcement came after the House Oversight and Government Reform Committee stated that it intended to subpoena him to testify as part of its inquiry into the federal government's handling of the investigations and prosecutions of Jeffrey Epstein.

Mueller died on March 20, 2026, in Charlottesville, Virginia, at the age of 81. Following his death, Trump posted on Truth Social: "Good, I'm glad he's dead. He can no longer hurt innocent people!" Other U.S. political figures, including Barack Obama, George W. Bush, Cory Booker, and Chuck Schumer, praised Mueller and condemned Trump's reaction, while Mueller investigation target Roger Stone issued statements agreeing with Trump.

Legal offices
Preceded by Bill Weld	United States Attorney for the District of Massachusetts; Acting; 1986–1987	Succeeded by Frank L. McNamara
Preceded by Edward Dennis	United States Assistant Attorney General for the Criminal Division; 1990–1993	Succeeded by Jo Ann Harris
Preceded by Michael Yamaguchi	United States Attorney for the Northern District of California; 1998–2001	Succeeded by Kevin Ryan
Preceded by Eric Holder	United States Deputy Attorney General; Acting; 2001	Succeeded by Larry Thompson
Government offices
Preceded by Louis Freeh	Director of the Federal Bureau of Investigation; 2001–2013	Succeeded by James Comey
Awards and achievements
Preceded by Gary Sinise	Recipient of the Sylvanus Thayer Award; 2016	Succeeded by George W. Bush
