= With Ballot and Bayonet =

1998 history book by Joseph Allan Frank

With Ballot and Bayonet: The Political Socialization of American Civil War Soldiers is a 1998 non-fiction book by Joseph Allan Frank, published by University of Georgia Press.

Stephen V. Ash of University of Tennessee, Knoxville stated that despite the title, the book covers how preceding history had formed mindsets and that the actual topic "is considerably broader."

For sources, the author used diaries and letters from soldiers on both sides of the conflict.

== Contents ==
The book's discussion portions do not often classify soldiers by their intensity of political understanding, but the organization of sources does organize by intensity of political understanding.

According to Ash, the book highlights how Confederate and Union soldiers had "similar" "minds" with "remarkably parallel" "beliefs".

== Reception ==
Martin Crawford of University of Keele wrote that the subject is important, and that researchers on the subject "will need to deal with" the book's content. Crawford criticized "overblown" wording, "repetitive" statements, and "one-dimensionally made" and "too insistently" done conclusions.

Brian Dirck of Anderson University described the book as "sophisticated" and "scholarly", and that it "is an important addition to this growing body of literature." Dirck criticized how the work does not define what "conservative" and "liberal" mean, and he argued the book has "sometimes murky" organizing and style of writing.

Mark Grimsley of Ohio State University argued that the "fundamental argument" is "sound", but that the book does not properly "demonstrate" it, with what Grimsley describes as wrongly conflating "racism" with "politics".
