= Arnold Nordsieck =

American theoretical physicist (1911-1971)

- Born: Arnold Theodore Nordsieck; January 5, 1911; Marysville, Ohio
- Died: January 18, 1971 (aged 60); Santa Barbara, California
- Education: University of California, Berkeley (Ph.D., 1935); Columbia University (M.S., 1932)
- Known for: Bloch-Nordsieck cancellation of infrared divergences
- Scientific career
- Workplaces: Columbia University; Bell Telephone Laboratories; University of Illinois at Urbana-Champaign; General Research Corporation
- Thesis: Scattering of Radiation by an Electric Field (1935)
- Doctoral advisor: Robert Oppenheimer

Arnold Theodore Nordsieck (January 5, 1911 – January 18, 1971) was an American theoretical physicist. He is best known for his work with Felix Bloch on the infrared problem in quantum electrodynamics. He developed the inertial electrostatic gyroscope (ESG) used as part of the inertial navigation system of nuclear submarines that allows them to remain underwater without having to surface to ascertain their location.

== Biography ==
Arnold Theodore Nordsieck was born in Marysville, Ohio, on January 5, 1911. He entered Ohio State University, where he earned a M.S. degree in physics in 1932. He then went to the University of California, Berkeley, where he wrote his 1935 doctoral dissertation under the supervision of Robert Oppenheimer on the "Scattering of Radiation by an Electric Field".

A National Research Council fellowship allowed Nordsieck to travel to Germany in 1935 as a post-doctoral researcher at the University of Leipzig under Werner Heisenberg. With Felix Bloch he solved the infrared problem in quantum electrodynamics, the problem of differences in the scattering amplitudes for example in the bremsstrahlung, which had its origin in the vanishing rest mass of the photon. Bloch and Nordsieck showed that this due to the perturbation theory used, and were able to avoid it with a better method.

Returning to the United States in 1937, Nordsieck taught physics at Columbia University, where he conducted research into theoretical physics and microwave radiation. In 1942, he became a researcher at the Bell Telephone Laboratories. He was also an associate professor at Columbia from 1945 to 1946. From 1947 to 1961 he was a professor at the University of Illinois at Urbana-Champaign, where his doctoral students there included Erwin Hahn.

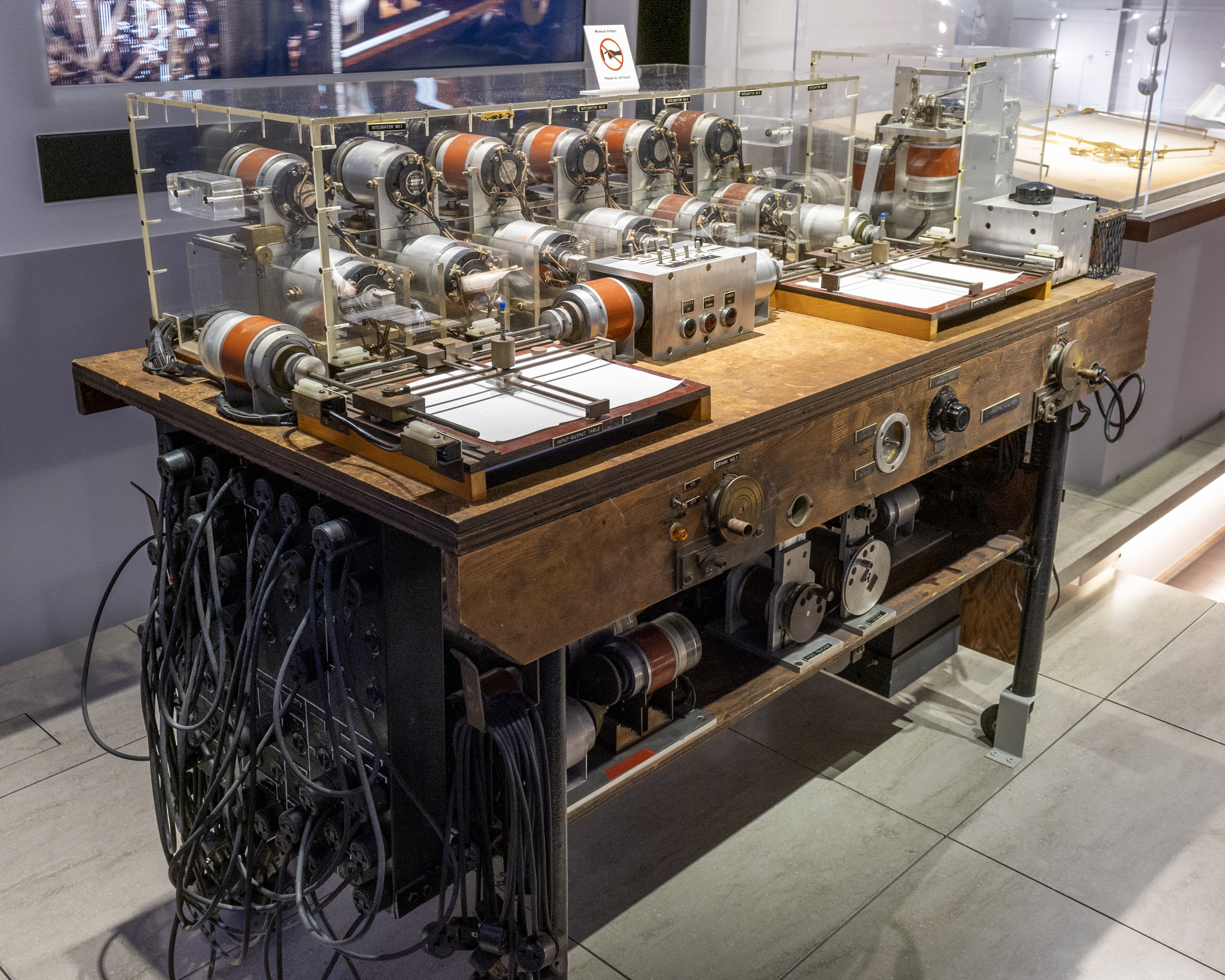
Nordsieck's differential analyzer, displayed at the Computer History Museum

Nordsieck built a differential analyzer (a form of analog computer) in 1950 at the University of Illinois from $700 worth of surplus electronic parts left over from World War II. Copies became the first computers at the Lawrence Livermore National Laboratory and Purdue University. In 1953 he developed the inertial electrostatic gyroscope (ESG), which was manufactured by Honeywell and other companies. It was used as part of the inertial navigation system of nuclear submarines, allowing them to travel underwater for months at a time without having to surface to ascertain their location. He also proposed the Cornfield system, a computer-based decision-making system for the air defense of ships using radar. This was one of the first applications of computer technology for decision makings. He was a 1955 Guggenheim Fellow.

With B. L Hicks, Nordsieck use Monte Carlo methods to solve nonlinear Boltzmann equation for various non-equilibrium problems in gas dynamics in the 1960s. He also published work on numerical mathematics. Later Nordsieck worked for the General Research Corporation in Santa Barbara, California, where he was Head of physics. He died in Santa Barbara on January 18, 1971.

In his honor, the University of Illinois at Urbana-Champaign (UIUC) has annually awarded, since 2002, the Nordsieck Award for excellence in teaching physics at UIUC. Notable winners of UIUC's Nordsieck Award include Nigel Goldenfeld (2003), George Gollin (2004), Paul Goldbart (2006), Alfred Hübler (2007), Steven Errede (2013), Kevin T. Pitts (2014), Brian L. DeMarco (2017) and Karin Dahmen (2020). The University of California, Santa Barbara (UCSB) gives the Arnold Nordsieck Award annually to a graduating senior who majors in physics and shows research promise.
