= Gilbert W. Stafford =

Gilbert "Gil" W. Stafford (December 30, 1938 – March 30, 2008) was an American scholarly and pastoral leader in the Church of God Movement (Anderson, Indiana). He was well known inside and outside his church group for his enthusiastic teaching and preaching. Stafford taught systematic theology for many years in the Anderson School of Theology and worked as the speaker for the formerly Christian Brotherhood Hour (CBH), later changed to Christians Broadcasting Hope. Additionally, he contributed in the field of Christian scholarship offering many books and articles from a Wesleyan-holiness perspective. His most substantial work was Theology For Disciples, published in 1996.

== Life ==
Stafford was born in Portageville, Missouri, on December 30, 1938, to D.C. and Orell Stafford. He graduated from Mt. Carmel High School in 1956 and Anderson College in 1961. Believing God wished him to be a minister, he enrolled in the Anderson University School of Theology in 1960.

In 1962, he moved to the Greater Boston area in Massachusetts to work as a pastor for the Malden Church of God. Stafford received his Master of Divinity degree at Andover Newton Theological School, along with his Th.D. from Boston University in 1973.

Dr. Stafford began work at the Anderson University School of Theology as professor of systematic theology in 1976. He eventually served the seminary in the roles of associate dean and dean of the chapel. He played a major role in developing Anderson's Doctor of Ministry degree before his retirement in 2007. Dr. Stafford died from cancer in the spring of 2008.

Among the many articles and books he wrote or contributed to some are Vision for the Church of God at the Crossroads (2002), Church of God at the Crossroads (2000), The Life of Salvation (1979), and Living as Redeemed People (1976).
