= James L. Edwards (academic administrator) =

4th President of Anderson University
- In office July 1, 1990 – March 2, 2015
- Preceded by: Robert A. Nicholson
- Succeeded by: John S. Pistole

Personal details
- Education: Anderson University; Ohio State University

James L. Edwards is the former president of the Anderson University, a position he had held since July 1, 1990, and the former president of the Anderson School of Theology.

== Education ==
Edwards completed his bachelor's and master's degree from Anderson University and the Anderson University School of Theology. In 1987, he went on to receive his Doctor of Philosophy in Educational Policy and Leadership from Ohio State University. His dissertation was titled Connections: Things That Matter to Teachers in Small Colleges. While completing his doctoral studies, he received the Earl W. Anderson Award for Research in Higher Education from Ohio State’s College of Education.

== Career ==
Edwards became president of Anderson University on July 1, 1990. He was the fourth president in the university's history and also presided over the Anderson University School of Theology. President Edwards is commonly and popularly referred to as "P. Eddy" by the Anderson University students. This is from the abbreviation of the word "President" and the shortening of the name "Edwards." As of 2014, Edwards has officially announced that he is stepping down as president and will conclude by the end of the 2014-2015 academic year. His last year of service will mark 25 years.

Academic offices
Preceded by Robert A. Nicholson	4th President of Anderson University; 1990 — 2015	Succeeded by John S. Pistole
