= Thomas J. Pickard =

Acting Director of the FBI from June 25, 2001 to Sept. 4, 2001 (born 1950)

Thomas Pickard
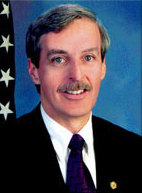

Director of the Federal Bureau of Investigation
- Acting
- In office June 25, 2001 – September 4, 2001
- President: George W. Bush
- Preceded by: Louis Freeh
- Succeeded by: Robert Mueller

11th Deputy Director of the Federal Bureau of Investigation
- In office November 1, 1999 – November 30, 2001
- President: Bill Clinton; George W. Bush
- Preceded by: Robert M. Bryant
- Succeeded by: Bruce J. Gebhardt

Personal details
- Born: Thomas Joseph Pickard; January 6, 1950 (age 76) New York City, New York, U.S.
- Party: Democratic
- Education: St. Francis College (BBA); St. John's University, New York (MBA)

Thomas Joseph Pickard (born January 6, 1950) is an American lawyer who served as the acting Director of the Federal Bureau of Investigation for 71 days in the summer of 2001 following the resignation of Director Louis Freeh.

== Early life and education ==
Born in Woodside, Queens, New York. He graduated from Saint Francis College in Brooklyn with a BBA in accounting, and subsequently received his MBA in taxation from St. John's University in Jamaica, Queens. He is a Certified Public Accountant, licensed by the state of New York.

== FBI career ==
Pickard began his career as a Special Agent of the FBI on January 13, 1975, and after a period of training, he was initially assigned to the New York City field office. In April 1979, Pickard was transferred to the Washington, D.C., field office, where he worked in an undercover capacity on the case code-named "ABSCAM." In July 1980, Pickard was promoted to FBI Headquarters, serving in the Inspection and Criminal Investigative Divisions. In October 1984, Pickard reported to the New York City field office as a supervisor in the White-Collar Crime Section and later was appointed to be the Assistant Special Agent in Charge for all White-Collar Crime investigations and violent crime matters in New York.

In 1989, Pickard was selected for the FBI's Senior Executive Service and was transferred to FBI Headquarters, where he oversaw the FBI's finance operations and subsequently its personnel operations. In 1993, Pickard was transferred to the New York City Office once again, to serve as the Special Agent in Charge of the National Security Division, supervising such matters as the trials of the 1993 World Trade Center bombing defendants, the trial of Omar Abdel-Rahman and his co-conspirators, the Manila Air conviction of Ramzi Yousef and his associates, and the July 1996, TWA Flight 800 explosion.

On September 10, 1996, FBI Director Louis Freeh named Pickard to the position of Assistant Director in Charge of the Washington field office. During his tenure there, Pickard supervised such matters as the investigation and arrest of FBI Special Agent Earl Pitts for espionage and the capture of convicted CIA killer Mir Amir Kansi.

On February 2, 1998, Pickard assumed the position of Assistant Director of the FBI's Criminal Investigative Division at FBI Headquarters. On November 1, 1999, Pickard was appointed Deputy Director, the number two position at the FBI. On June 25, 2001, upon the resignation of director Louis Freeh, Pickard was appointed Acting Director of the FBI by Attorney General John Ashcroft, and served in that capacity two months until the new Director took office. Pickard retired in November of that year.

The FBI's bureaucracy, and Pickard in particular, has been implicated as an opponent of FBI agent John P. O'Neill who led the FBI's investigation into Osama bin Laden prior to the September 11 attacks. A leak to The New York Times in August 2001 regarding a security breach by O'Neill resulted in O'Neill leaving public service. Pickard has been alleged to be the source of the leak. O'Neill took work as the director of security at the World Trade Center, where he was killed on September 11, 2001.

Government offices
Preceded by Louis Freeh	Director of the Federal Bureau of Investigation; Acting; 2001	Succeeded by Robert Mueller
