= Michael Yamaguchi =

American attorney

United States Attorney for the Northern District of California
- In office 1993 – August 24, 1998
- President: Bill Clinton
- Preceded by: John Mendez
- Succeeded by: Robert Mueller

Personal details
- Party: Democratic

Michael Yamaguchi is an American attorney who served as the United States Attorney for the Northern District of California from 1993 to 1998.
