= Steven Errede =

American physicist

Steven Michael Errede (born December 24, 1952) is an American experimental physicist, known for his leadership in the collaboration that experimentally confirmed the existence of the top quark.

== Biography ==
Errede received in 1976 his B.S. from the University of Minnesota. For some time he worked at the University of Minnesota's Space Science Center on electronic payloads for sounding rockets used in studying the composition and magnetic field of Earth's upper atmosphere. In 1976 he became a graduate student in physics at Ohio State University, where he graduated with a Ph.D. in 1981. From 1981 to 1984 he was a postdoc at the University of Michigan, where he worked on the IMB Proton Decay Experiment. At the University of Illinois Urbana-Champaign (UIUC), he was from 1984 to 1989 an assistant professor and from 1989 to 1992 an associate professor and is since 1992 a full professor.

Errede and his team worked on the ATLAS experiment at CERN's Large Hadron Collider in Geneva, Switzerland. His research team built a major portion of the ATLAS experiment's Scintillating Tile Hadronic Calorimeter, used in the 2012 discovery of the Higgs boson.

In 1985 he was awarded a Sloan Research Fellowship. In 1995 he was elected a fellow of the APS in recognition of his "contributions to the understanding of the nature of the weak gauge bosons."

In 2013 he won the UIUC's Nordsieck Award for excellence in teaching physics. Errede developed laboratory equipment used in his teaching of undergraduate courses on acoustical physics and physics of musical instruments.

His wife is Deborah M. Errede, who has a Ph.D. in physics from the University of Michigan. His father, Louis A. Errede (1923–2017), had a PhD in organic chemistry from the University of Michigan and worked for 3M Company. Steven and Deborah Errede have worked together for many years and have a daughter Rachel.

== Selected publications ==
- Abe, F.; et al. (1988). "The CDF detector: An overview". Nuclear Instruments and Methods in Physics Research Section A: Accelerators, Spectrometers, Detectors and Associated Equipment. 271 (3): 387–403. Bibcode:1988NIMPA.271..387A. doi:10.1016/0168-9002(88)90298-7. 1988
- Bionta, R. M.; et al. (1991). "Observation of a Neutrino Burst in Coincidence with Supernova 1987A in the Large Magellanic Cloud". Neutrinos and Other Matters. pp. 340–342. doi:10.1142/9789814343060_0050. ISBN 978-981-02-0270-5. 1991
- Abe, F.; et al. (1994). "Evidence for top quark production in $\overline p p$ collisions at √s=1.8 TeV". Physical Review D. 50 (5): 2966–3026. doi:10.1103/PhysRevD.50.2966. PMID 10017937. 1994
- Ajaltouni, Z.; et al. (1997). "Response of the ATLAS Tile calorimeter prototype to muons". Nuclear Instruments and Methods in Physics Research Section A: Accelerators, Spectrometers, Detectors and Associated Equipment. 388 (1–2): 64–78. Bibcode:1997NIMPA.388...64A. doi:10.1016/S0168-9002(97)00331-8.
- Abe, F.; et al. (1995). "Observation of Top Quark Production in $\overline p p$ Collisions with the Collider Detector at Fermilab". Physical Review Letters. 74 (14): 2626–2631. arXiv:hep-ex/9503002. doi:10.1103/PhysRevLett.74.2626. hdl:1721.1/87761. PMID 10057978.
- Aaltonen, T.; et al. (2009). "Observation of Electroweak Single Top-Quark Production". Physical Review Letters. 103 (9) 092002. arXiv:0903.0885. Bibcode:2009PhRvL.103i2002A. doi:10.1103/PhysRevLett.103.092002. hdl:10902/2061. PMID 19792788. S2CID 8029289.
- Adragna, P.; et al. (2010). "Measurement of pion and proton response and longitudinal shower profiles up to 20 nuclear interaction lengths with the ATLAS Tile calorimeter". Nuclear Instruments and Methods in Physics Research Section A: Accelerators, Spectrometers, Detectors and Associated Equipment. 615 (2): 158–181. Bibcode:2010NIMPA.615..158A. doi:10.1016/j.nima.2010.01.037. hdl:10550/35430.
- Aaltonen, T.; et al. (2022). "High-precision measurement of the W boson mass with the CDF II detector". Science. 376 (6589): 170–176. Bibcode:2022Sci...376..170C. doi:10.1126/science.abk1781. hdl:11365/1200783. PMID 35389814. S2CID 248025265.
