= Bruce J. Gebhardt =

American Federal Bureau of Investigation agent

12th Deputy Director of the Federal Bureau of Investigation
- In office 2002–2004
- President: George W. Bush
- Preceded by: Thomas J. Pickard
- Succeeded by: John S. Pistole

Personal details
- Born: 1949 or 1950 (age 76–77) Baltimore, Maryland, U.S.
- Education: Western Illinois University; Sam Houston University (MS)

Bruce J. Gebhardt (born 1949/50) is an American former Federal Bureau of Investigation (FBI) special agent who served as Deputy Director of the Federal Bureau of Investigation.

The son of Bob Gebhardt, also an FBI agent and special agent in charge, he was born in Baltimore, Maryland and attended Western Illinois University and Sam Houston University, earning a master's degree in criminology from the latter.

He joined the FBI as a special agent in 1974; prior to his service as deputy director, he had served as special agent in charge of the Phoenix Division and San Francisco Divisions of the agency. In May 2002, he was appointed by director Robert Mueller as executive assistant director for Criminal Investigations; he served in the position until August 2002 when he was appointed deputy director. Gebhardt retired from the FBI as deputy director in 2004. Following his retirement from the FBI, he was hired by MGM Mirage in November 2004 as senior vice president of global security, overseeing security at MGM Mirage properties.

He was awarded the FBI Medal of Valor in 1976, the FBI's highest honor for heroism, for actions taken as a special agent during a plane hijacking at the Denver Airport on April 18, 1976. Gebhardt and a partner, who had been stationed on a plane in which a hijacker had taken hostages, opened fire on the hijacker killing him in the process and saving the hostages.
