= Kevin T. Pitts =

American physicist and professor

- Born: Kevin Todd Pitts; 1965 (age 60–61)
- Education: University of Oregon; Anderson University
- Awards: American Physical Society Fellow, 2014; American Association for the Advancement of Science Fellow, 2016
- Scientific career
- Fields: High energy particle physics
- Workplaces: University of Illinois 1999–2022; Fermilab 2021–2022; Virginia Tech 2022–Present
- Thesis: Electroweak coupling measurements from polarized bhabha scattering at the Z^{0} resonance (1994)
- Doctoral advisor: James E. Brau

Kevin T. Pitts (born 1965) is an American high energy particle physicist. The Dean of Virginia Tech College of Science and professor of physics, he has served as Chief Research Officer at Fermilab National Accelerator Laboratory. His research interests have included the CDF experiment and the Muon g-2 experiment at Fermilab.

== Early life and education ==
Kevin T. Pitts, born in Indiana in 1965, earned a B.A. in physics and mathematics at Anderson University, where he also played baseball and made appearances in the NAIA College World Series in 1984 and 1987. He earned M.S. and Ph.D. degrees in physics at the University of Oregon. In 1994 Pitts completed his dissertation, titled Electroweak coupling measurements from polarized bhabha scattering at the Z0 resonance, advised by J. Brau.

== Career ==
Pitts began his research in high-energy physics at Fermilab in 1994. At the Fermilab Tevatron he investigated heavy-flavor physics and participated in the CDF experiment Higgs boson searches. He developed instrumentation for the tracking and trigger systems and served in a number of leadership roles.

In 2012 Pitts became a member of the Muon g-2 experiment at Fermilab. His research group played a major role in the accelerator/experiment interface as well as the muon spin procession analysis. In 2026, the Collaboration and its predecessors were awarded the Fundamental Physics Breakthrough Prize.

He joined the faculty at the University of Illinois in 1999 and became associate head for undergraduate programs in 2010. In 2014, he was named associate dean for undergraduate programs in the Grainger College of Engineering, and then served as vice provost for undergraduate education.

As vice provost, he was the architect of the "Illinois Commitment" program to offer free tuition and fees to "talented low- to moderate-income students and those who are the first generation to go to college". He was also the principal investigator on a grant to increase access to science and engineering for low income students, an effort supported by Amazon. Pitts served in the chair line for the National Conference for Undergraduate Women in Physics (CUWiP). He also founded "ICANEXSEL", a University of Illinois College of Engineering program to engage inner-city Chicago middle and high school students in STEM. Pitts also served on the board of directors for the nonprofit Chicago Pre-college Science and Engineering Program.

In March 2021, Pitts became chief research officer at Fermilab National Accelerator Laboratory. His responsibilities there included oversight of the international Deep Underground Neutrino Experiment. He participated in the top quark discovery in 1995, and served on the Long Baseline Neutrino Committee.

Pitts also served on the Particle Physics Project Prioritization Panel.

In June 2022, Pitts was appointed Dean of Virginia Tech College of Science by the Virginia Tech Board of Visitors. He is also a professor in the Department of Physics at Virginia Tech.

In 2024, Pitts went to Thomas Jefferson National Accelerator Facility to serve as Special Advisor to Director Kimberly Sawyer.

In 2026, he co-led a successful proposal for Virginia Tech and SURA to serve as management and operations contractor for Jefferson Lab. The joint SURA-Virginia Tech entity, SURATech, took over management of Jefferson Lab on June 1, 2026. Pitts continues to serve on the SURATech Board of Directors.

== Selected publications ==
- Abi, B.; Albahri, T.; Al-Kilani, S.; Allspach, D.; Alonzi, L. P.; Anastasi, A.; Anisenkov, A.; Azfar, F.; Badgley, K.; Baeßler, S.; Bailey, I. (2021-04-07). "Measurement of the Positive Muon Anomalous Magnetic Moment to 0.46 ppm". Physical Review Letters. 126 (14) 141801. arXiv:2104.03281. Bibcode:2021PhRvL.126n1801A. doi:10.1103/PhysRevLett.126.141801. ISSN 0031-9007. PMID 33891447. S2CID 233169085.
- Pitts, Kevin T. (2008-04-02). "Future Science Needs Aid Now". Chicago Tribune. pp. 1–13.
- CDF Collaboration (2006-12-12). "Observation of Bs-Bsbar Oscillations". Physical Review Letters. 97 (24) 242003. arXiv:hep-ex/0609040. doi:10.1103/PhysRevLett.97.242003. hdl:10067/815500151162165141. ISSN 0031-9007. PMID 17280271.
- The ALEPH Collaboration; the DELPHI Collaboration; the L3 Collaboration; the OPAL Collaboration; the SLD Collaboration; the LEP Electroweak Working Group; the SLD electroweak; heavy flavour groups (2006-05-01). "Precision electroweak measurements on the Z resonance". Physics Reports. 427 (5): 257–454. arXiv:hep-ex/0509008. Bibcode:2006PhR...427..257A. doi:10.1016/j.physrep.2005.12.006. ISSN 0370-1573. S2CID 119482321.
- CDF Collaboration (2000-03-09). "A Measurement of sin2β from B→J/ψK0S with the CDF detector". Physical Review D. 61 (7) 072005. arXiv:hep-ex/9909003. doi:10.1103/PhysRevD.61.072005. ISSN 0556-2821.
- CDF Collaboration; Abe, F.; Akimoto, H.; Akopian, A.; Albrow, M. G.; Amendolia, S. R.; Amidei, D.; Antos, J.; Anway-Wiese, C.; Aota, S.; Apollinari, G. (1995-04-03). "Observation of Top Quark Production in $\bar{p}$${p}$ Collisions with the Collider Detector at Fermilab". Physical Review Letters. 74 (14): 2626–2631. arXiv:hep-ex/9503002. Bibcode:1995PhRvL..74.2626A. doi:10.1103/PhysRevLett.74.2626. hdl:2241/103691. PMID 10057978.

== Selected awards, honors ==
- American Association for the Advancement of Science Fellow, elected 2016.
- American Physical Society Fellow, 2014, For his leading role in heavy-flavor physics at the Tevatron collider, including the first evidence of CP violation in bottom mesons, and for significant contributions to triggering at the Collider.
- Arnold O. Nordsieck Award for Excellence in Teaching, 2014, For his creation and inspirational teaching of innovative courses that introduce undergraduates to the philosophy, fidelity, and elegance of science.
- University of Illinois, University Scholar, 2013. "The University Scholars Program recognizes outstanding members of the faculty and provides each with a funding allocation to enhance their scholarly activities."
- National Science Foundation CAREER Award, 2004.
- United States Department of Energy Outstanding Junior Investigator Award, 2002. A Stereo Tracking System for the CDF Detector.
