= Kip Hawley =

American government official (1953–2022)

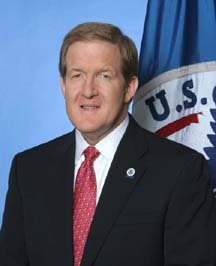
- Official portrait, 2005

4th Administrator of the Transportation Security Administration
- In office July 27, 2005 – January 20, 2009
- President: George W. Bush
- Preceded by: David M. Stone
- Succeeded by: Gale Rossides

Personal details
- Born: Edmund Summers Hawley III; November 10, 1953 Waltham, Massachusetts, U.S.
- Died: March 21, 2022 (aged 68) Pacific Grove, California, U.S.
- Spouse: Janet Isak (m. 1980)
- Children: 2
- Education: Brown University (BA); University of Virginia School of Law (JD)

Edmund Summers "Kip" Hawley III (November 10, 1953 – March 21, 2022) was an American government official and business executive who was administrator of the Transportation Security Administration, part of United States government's Department of Homeland Security, from July 27, 2005, to January 20, 2009. He replaced the previous Director, Rear Admiral David Stone. He was succeeded by Acting Administrator Gale Rossides.

== Personal life ==
Hawley was born on November 10, 1953, in Waltham, Massachusetts, and was raised in Winchester, Massachusetts, the son of Greta (Crocker), a homemaker, and Edmund Blair Hawley, a management consultant, venture capital executive, and educator. He received his bachelor's degree in political science from Brown University in 1976, and his Juris Doctor degree from the University of Virginia School of Law in 1980.

Hawley married Janet Isak in 1980, and they had two children. He died from lung cancer at his home in Pacific Grove, California, on March 21, 2022, at the age of 68.

== Career ==
Hawley's appointment to Administrator was the second time he had occupied a duty station at TSA. After the terrorist attacks of 9/11, then-Secretary of Transportation Norman Mineta tapped him to lead "Go-Teams" of government and private sector experts who tackled the task of quickly establishing a new federal agency.

Prior to this he was CEO of Skyway, a supply-chain services company, and Vice President at Union Pacific Railroad. Previous government service included serving on the National Commission on Intermodal Transportation (in 1992) and as Deputy Assistant and Special Assistant to President Ronald Reagan. Hawley also served as Deputy Assistant Secretary and Executive Director of Governmental Affairs for the Department of Transportation, responsible for planning budgets and legislative proposals. He was also Executive Vice President of Arzoon, a supply-chain software company in San Mateo, California. Arzoon is a subsidiary of SSA Global Technologies. Hawley also sat on the Air Traffic Services Subcommittee of the Federal Aviation Administration.

After heading the TSA, his two biggest projects were the "3-1-1" policy, which allows passengers to bring limited amount of liquids aboard an aircraft, and the PASS program, which rates the abilities of Transportation Officers.

== Leadership Journal Blog ==
Hawley was a contributing writer to the Leadership Journal Blog for the Department of Homeland Security, where topics included "Secure Flight", "Security Strategy" and "Covert Testing".

== Speeches and Congressional Testimonies ==
- On Covert Testing (11.14.07).
- TWIC Testimony before the House Homeland Security Committee (10.31.07).
- Implementing Recommendations of the 9/11 Commission Act of 2007 (10.16.07).
- Improving Aviation Security (10.16.07).
- Keynote Address to the Aero Club of Washington (07.24.07).

== Criticism ==
As head of the TSA, Hawley was a focal point for public criticism relating to what many consider intrusive and ineffective security measures at American airports. In September 2006, in response to the new policies limiting the amounts of liquids and gels that passengers could carry on airplanes, Milwaukee resident Ryan Bird wrote "Kip Hawley is an Idiot" on a plastic bag given to passengers by airport security for those substances. As a result, he claims he was detained and told that the First Amendment did not apply to security checkpoints.

In April 2007, Bruce Schneier interviewed Hawley regarding TSA policies and practices. Later, Schneier demonstrated flaws in TSA measures by bringing a variety of objects which are classified by the TSA as dangerous through security and onto planes. Objects included box cutters and a plastic "beer belly" filled with unexamined liquid.

Hawley responded to this incident: "Clever terrorists can use innovative ways to exploit vulnerabilities. But don't forget that most bombers are not, in fact, clever. Living bomb-makers are usually clever, but the person agreeing to carry it may not be super smart. Even if 'all' we do is stop dumb terrorists, we are reducing risk."

Government offices
Preceded by David Stone	4th Administrator of the Transportation Security Administration; 2005-2009	Succeeded by Gale Rossides
