= Karin Dahmen =

German condensed matter physicist

Karin Andrea Sabine Dahmen (born 1969) is a German condensed matter physicist whose research interests include non-equilibrium thermodynamics, critical phenomena, crackling noise, pattern formation, and quenched disorder, with wide applications of these topics to phenomena such as earthquakes, avalanches, variable stars, and population dynamics. She is a professor of physics at the University of Illinois at Urbana–Champaign.

== Education and career ==
After earning a degree in physics at the University of Bonn, Dahmen completed a Ph.D. in physics at Cornell University in 1995. She was a Harvard Junior Fellow from 1995 until 1999, when she took a faculty position at the University of Illinois.

== Recognition ==
In 2013, Dahmen was named a Fellow of the American Physical Society (APS), after a nomination by the APS Topical Group on Statistical & Nonlinear Physics, "for establishment and exploring the deep connections between non-equilibrium phase transitions and avalanche phenomena in diverse fields encompassing materials, geophysics and neuroscience".
