= Jo Ann Harris (federal prosecutor) =

American federal prosecutor (1933–2014)

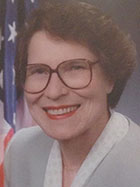
United States Assistant Attorney General for the Criminal Division Jo Ann Harris.

Jo Ann Harris (née Murray; May 18, 1933 – October 30, 2014) was a federal prosecutor and the first woman to head the Criminal Division of the United States Department of Justice. Among other accomplishments during her tenure, she created a special task force to investigate abortion clinic bombings, and was involved in the investigation of the Oklahoma City bombing.

== Early life ==
Harris was born in Macomb, Illinois and grew up in Galesburg, where she attended public schools.

She majored in Journalism at the University of Iowa and graduated in 1955. Harris had a successful career in magazine journalism, working for publications including the Ladies Home Journal, Better Homes and Gardens and Time Magazine. She met her husband Greg Harris, whom she married in 1965, while working at Time. Harris died in 2014 in The Bronx, New York, aged 81 from lung cancer.

== Legal career ==
Harris received her Juris Doctor from New York University at age 39 in 1972 and clerked for Lawrence W. Pierce, then a U.S. District Judge in the Southern District of New York.

In 1974, she joined the Criminal Division of the U.S. Attorney's Office for the Southern District of New York. She served as an assistant U.S. Attorney from 1974–79 and 1981–82, and as Executive Assistant U.S. Attorney under U.S. Attorney John Martin from 1982–83. Her best-known prosecution was that of the Rev. Sun Myung Moon, leader of the Unification Church, for tax evasion in 1982.

Her first role in the Department of Justice's Criminal Division in Washington D.C. was from 1979–81 as Chief of the Fraud Section where she approved and supervised the first successful prosecution under the newly enacted Foreign Corrupt Practices Act.

Harris served as the first woman to head the Justice Department's Criminal Division in Washington, D.C. from 1993–95. In that role, she supervised investigations and prosecutions being handled by over 400 government lawyers and established the Department's first Computer Crime section and a task force to investigate violence against abortion clinics.

She was responsible for the early part of the investigation of the Oklahoma City bombing in 1995. She also developed a plan for the role of U.S Attorneys in the Criminal Division's 1995 violent crime initiative that proposed a new violent crime section in the Criminal Division and regional desks to help U.S. Attorneys coordinate investigations.

In 2000, then Independent Counsel Robert W. Ray, appointed Harris and a colleague, Mary Frances Harkenrider, as special counsels to investigate a January 1998 confrontation between government lawyers and Monica Lewinsky that contributed to the impeachment of President Bill Clinton. The 100-page report found no evidence of prosecutorial misconduct but concluded that the lead attorney "exercised poor judgment and made mistakes in his analysis, planning and execution of the approach to Lewinsky."
