= Lynelle Jonsson =

American actress, singer and dancer

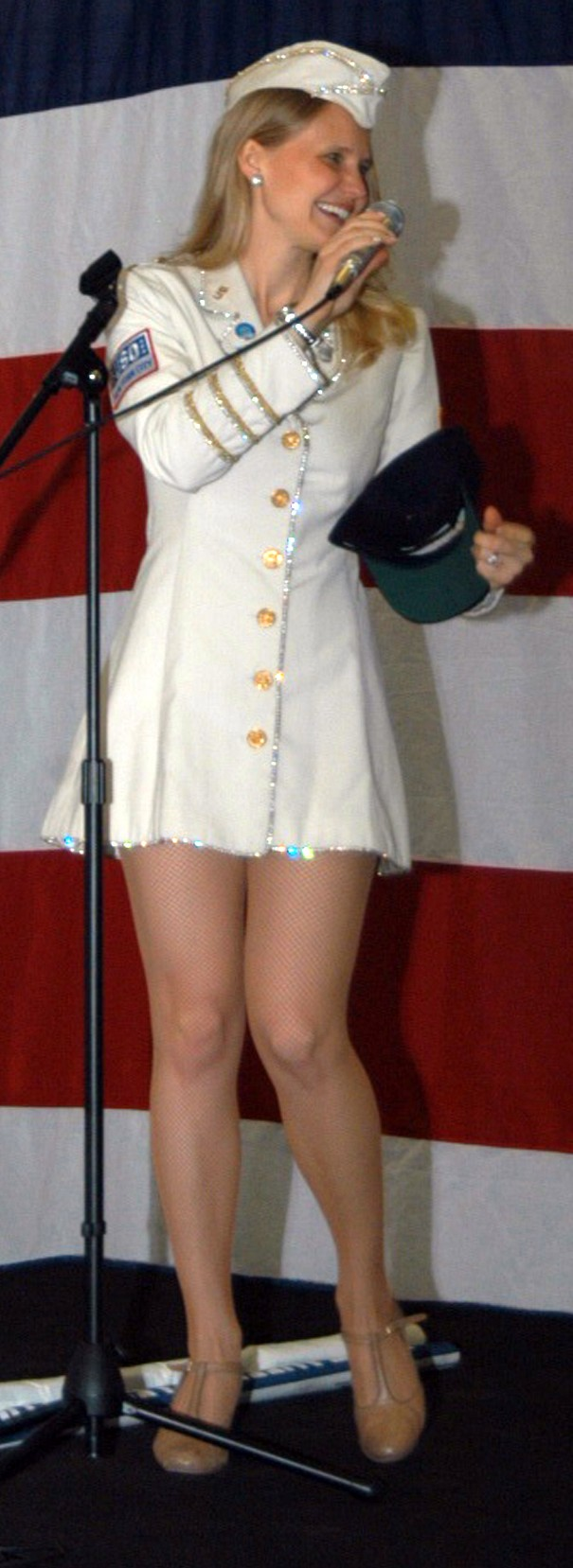
Lynelle Jonsson, 2006

Lynelle Jonsson is an American stage actress, dancer, and soprano singer. In 2004, and again in 2005, she was Miss USO and joined the Metropolitan New York USO Troupe of performers. She performed with the New York Gilbert and Sullivan Players and in other theatre and opera companies before concentrating, from 2010, in concert singing, mostly in Europe.

== Stage actress and concert singer ==
Jonsson performed with New York Gilbert and Sullivan Players as ensemble cast member for eight years, usually at New York City Center. Her credits with them include:

- The Pirates of Penzance, New York Gilbert and Sullivan Players
- The Mikado New York Gilbert and Sullivan Players
- H.M.S. Pinafore, New York Gilbert and Sullivan Players

Her other stage acting credits include

- The Buddy Holly Story as Peggy Sue, with the Helen Hayes Theatre and Ogunquit Playhouse
- The Music Man playing Marian Paroo
- The Sound of Music playing Maria
- Così fan tutte playing Despina
- Lily's Crossing as Lily Monahan, with ArtsPower National Touring Theatre.
- Dracula, the Musical as Vampire Bride, Theater Ulm, Germany (2021–2022; also appearing in the 2022 live film).

Concert credits include:

- More than 500 appearances as Miss USO and with the USO Troupe of Metropolitan New York.
- "Die Grosse Nacht der Filmmusik" Germany tour 2010 mit Aktiv Event Berlin
- "Tui Entertainment Mein Schiff" Klassischer Abend und Evening of Sondheim 2010–2011
- "Macy's Thanksgiving Day Parade on NBC" with United We Sing 2011
- "Pomp Duck and Circumstance" Stuttgart, Neu Ulm, Frankfurt, Berlin, Zurich 2011–2015
- "The 10 Sopranos" Germany tour 2012
- Birdland Jazz Series guest artist with Munich Swing Orchestra, AUDI forum. 2012, 2014
- MS Europa, MS Europa 2 guest artist world tours 2012–2016
- "Musicals in Concert" Over the Rainbow Show Productions, European Tour 2013–2017
- "A Spectacular Night of Queen" European tour 2014–2015
- The Show Must Go On Queen European tour 2015–2019
- Peter Wölke Entertainment gala concert tours (Switzerland and Germany, 2020–2025)
