= Gale Rossides =

American government official

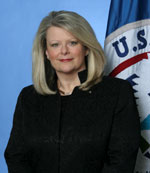

Acting Administrator of the Transportation Security Administration
- In office January 20, 2009 – June 24, 2010
- President: Barack Obama
- Preceded by: Kip Hawley
- Succeeded by: John S. Pistole

Gale D. Rossides is the former acting administrator of the Transportation Security Administration (TSA) from January 2009 until June 2010.

Rossides has a bachelor's degree from Wheaton College (Massachusetts) and an MPA from George Washington University. She was on a committee charged with reforming the Bureau of Alcohol, Tobacco, and Firearms in the wake of the attempts to arrest David Koresh that led to the Waco siege. In 2002 she was one of the original founders of the TSA.

She is the daughter of Greek American football player and politician Gene Rossides.

== Sources ==
- TSA bio of Rossides
