= Anderson School of Theology =

Graduate theological school in Indiana

- Type: Private, Christian
- Established: 1950
- Affiliations: Church of God (Anderson)
- President: John S. Pistole
- Location: Anderson, Indiana, United States; 40.112771°N 85.664230°W
- Website: www.anderson.edu/sot/

Anderson University School of Theology is the graduate theological school affiliated with the Church of God (Anderson). It is a part of Anderson University and receives students from Azusa Pacific University, Bay Ridge Christian College, Gardner College, Mid-America Christian University, Warner Pacific College, Warner University, and other schools.

The school is mainly associated with the Wesleyan-Holiness tradition. It is an institution accredited by the Association of Theological Schools, and grants the following degrees:

- Doctor of Ministry (D. Min.)
- Master of Divinity (M.Div.)
- Master of Theological Studies (S. T. M.)
- Master of Arts in Intercultural Service (M.A.I.S.)
- an online Master of Arts in Christian Ministries (M.A.C.M.).

== History ==
The school was established in 1917 for the training of ministers in the Church of God (Anderson).
