= John S. Pistole =

President of Anderson University, Former TSA Administrator

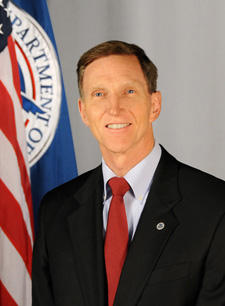

5th President of Anderson University
- In office March 2, 2015 – June 1, 2025
- Preceded by: James L. Edwards
- Succeeded by: Scott Moats

5th Administrator of the Transportation Security Administration
- In office June 25, 2010 – December 31, 2014
- President: Barack Obama
- Deputy: Melvin Carraway
- Preceded by: Kip Hawley
- Succeeded by: Peter V. Neffenger

13th Deputy Director of the Federal Bureau of Investigation
- In office October 1, 2004 – May 17, 2010
- President: George W. Bush; Barack Obama
- Preceded by: Bruce J. Gebhardt
- Succeeded by: Timothy P. Murphy

Personal details
- Born: June 1, 1956 (age 70) Baltimore, Maryland, U.S.
- Education: Anderson University, Indiana (BA); Indiana University–Purdue University Indianapolis (JD)

John S. Pistole (born June 1, 1956) is the former administrator of the United States Transportation Security Administration (TSA), a former deputy director of the Federal Bureau of Investigation, and the former president of Anderson University.

== Education ==
Pistole was born on June 1, 1956, in Baltimore, Maryland. He is a graduate of Anderson University and the Indiana University Robert H. McKinney School of Law, a division of Indiana University – Purdue University Indianapolis. Pistole practiced law for two years before joining the FBI in 1983.

== Public service ==
Since the World Trade Center and Pentagon attacks, John Pistole has been involved in the formation of terrorism policies during the Bush and Obama administrations.

=== 9/11 Commission ===
On April 14, 2004, Pistole testified before the 9/11 Commission at its 10th public hearing on a panel, Preventing Future Attacks Inside the United States.

On June 16, 2004, Pistole testified before the 9/11 Commission at its 12th public hearing. The page on the 9/11 Commission website does not include Pistole's name, and the PDF transcript does not list him as a participant, but he testified on June 16, 2004, as a panelist. He discussed threat levels of a possible attack by Al-Qaeda in 2004, as well as other topics.

On August 23, 2004, Pistole testified before Congress about changes the FBI made in response to the 9/11 Commission.

Pistole and Valerie E. Caproni were the two FBI officials who approved a memo laying out the FBI's policy on the limits to the interrogation of captives taken during the United States' war on terror. The memo was from the FBI's general counsel, to all offices, explaining that FBI officials were not allowed to engage in coercive interrogations; FBI officials were not allowed to sit in on coercive interrogations conducted by third parties; FBI officials were required to immediately report any instances of suspected coercive interrogation up the FBI chain of command.

=== FBI ===
Pistole served as deputy director of the FBI from October 2004 to May 2010. As deputy director, Pistole was second in command within the FBI and pivotally involved in the formation of terrorism policies.

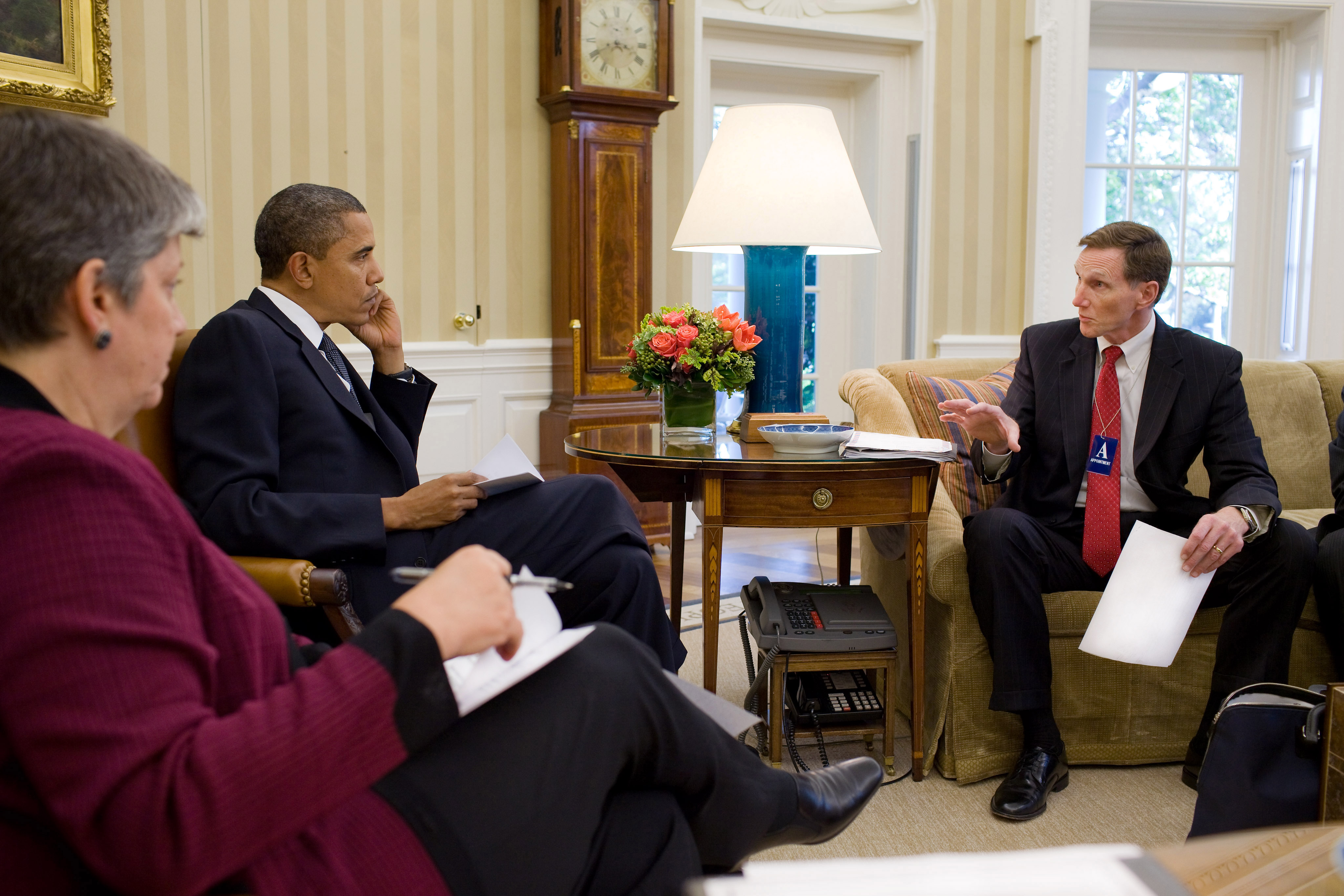
Pistole and Homeland Security Secretary Janet Napolitano meet with President Obama in the Oval Office.

=== TSA ===
Pistole was nominated by President Barack Obama to serve as administrator of the Transportation Security Administration on May 17, 2010, and was unanimously confirmed to serve in that position by the United States Senate on June 25, 2010. On November 16, 2010, Pistole defended his agency's new extensive pat-down procedures and Advanced Imaging Technology (A.I.T) as necessary.

On November 21, 2010, Pistole again justified the new search policies on CNN saying "We know through intelligence that there are determined people, terrorists who are trying to kill not only Americans but innocent people around the world."

On November 21, 2010, Pistole acknowledged that new TSA screening procedures are "invasive" and "uncomfortable" but said they were necessary. Many questions raised by American citizens regarding this policy remain unanswered and Pistole has remained silent regarding significant constitutional objections.

After a February 2011 attempt by a TSA VIPR team in Savannah to search passengers disembarking from an Amtrak train, the TSA was banned from Amtrak property by Amtrak Police Chief John O'Connor.

On October 16, 2014, Pistole announced that he would retire as TSA administrator effective December 31, 2014, and take a position in academia. On October 27, 2014, he was elected to be the fifth president of his alma mater, Anderson University in Anderson, Indiana.

On May 30, 2017, news broke that President Donald Trump contacted Pistole about an interview to fill the opening created by the firing of FBI Director James Comey.

== Anderson University ==
On March 2, 2015, Pistole began his presidency as Anderson University's fifth president. Students of Anderson University commonly refer to him as "PJP" (President John Pistole). In August 2024, Pistole would announce his intention to retire from the presidency of the university on June 1, 2025. On December 6, 2024, he would receive the Sagamore of the Wabash award from Governor Eric Holcomb for his time serving as the university's president.

== Book ==
On February 3, 2021, a biography about John was released called John S. Pistole: Searching for Integrity & Faith.

Government offices
Preceded by Bruce J. Gebhardt	Deputy Director of the Federal Bureau of Investigation; 2004–2010	Succeeded by Timothy P. Murphy
Preceded by Gale Rossides; Acting	5th Administrator of the Transportation Security Administration; 2010–2014	Succeeded by Melvin Carraway; Acting
Academic offices
Preceded by James L. Edwards	5th President of Anderson University; 2015–2025	Succeeded by Scott Moats
