= Anderson University (Indiana) =

Christian university in Anderson, Indiana, US

- Former names: Anderson Bible Training School (1917–1925); Anderson College (1925–1988)
- Motto: Academic and Christian Discovery
- Type: Private university
- Established: 1917; 109 years ago
- Religious affiliation: Church of God (Anderson, Indiana)
- Academic affiliations: Space-grant
- Endowment: $27.9 million
- President: Scott Moats
- Provost: Courtney Taylor
- Faculty: 106
- Students: 1,567
- Undergraduates: 1,311
- Other students: 256
- Location: Anderson, Indiana, U.S. 40°6′43″N 85°39′58″W
- Campus: Small city, 100 acres (40 ha)
- Colors: Orange and black
- Nickname: Ravens
- Sporting affiliations: NCAA Division III — HCAC
- Mascot: Rodney the Raven
- Website: anderson.edu
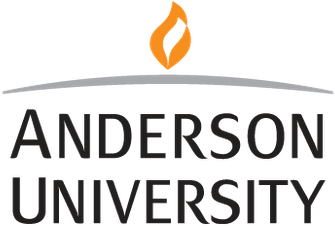

Anderson University is a private Christian university in Anderson, Indiana, United States. It is affiliated with the Church of God. The university offers more than 60 undergraduate majors as well as graduate programs in business, music, and theology. The university also offers Bachelor of Science degrees in civil, computer, electrical, mechanical, and mechatronics engineering.

== History ==
Naming history
Anderson Bible Training School	Established	1917
Anderson College	Renamed	1925
Anderson University	Renamed	1988

Anderson University was established in 1917 as the Anderson Bible Training School by the Church of God (Anderson, Indiana) movement. The school was a major step in the life of a fellowship of Christians that originated in 1881. The young school moved rapidly to develop a wider general education program, changed its name to Anderson College and Theological Seminary, then Anderson College, and finally, Anderson University.

=== Presidents ===
Presidents
President	Term
John A. Morrison	1923–1958
Robert H. Reardon	1958–1983
Robert A. Nicholson	1983–1990
James L. Edwards	1990–2015
John Pistole	2015–2025
Scott Moats	2025–present

== Organization ==
Anderson University has grown to include an undergraduate liberal arts program, organized into six schools and graduate programs in theology, music, and business.

=== Schools ===
- Falls School of Business
- School of Humanities and Behavioral Science
- School of Music, Theatre, and Dance
- School of Nursing and Kinesiology
- School of Theology and Christian Ministry
- School of Science & Engineering

== Academics ==
The university offers more than 60 majors.

=== Graduate programs ===
- School of Theology
  - Master of Theological Studies
  - Master of Divinity
  - Master of Arts in Christian Ministry
- Falls School of Business
  - Master of Business Administration
  - Doctorate of Business Administration
- Education
  - Master of Music Education
  - Master of Leadership

== Funding ==
Anderson University is a private institution, receiving funds from tuition, fees, research grants (including funds from the Lilly Endowment and the Indiana Department of Environmental Management), private scholarship funds, and alumni contributions. The university's endowment was $20.8 million as of FY06.

== Campus ==
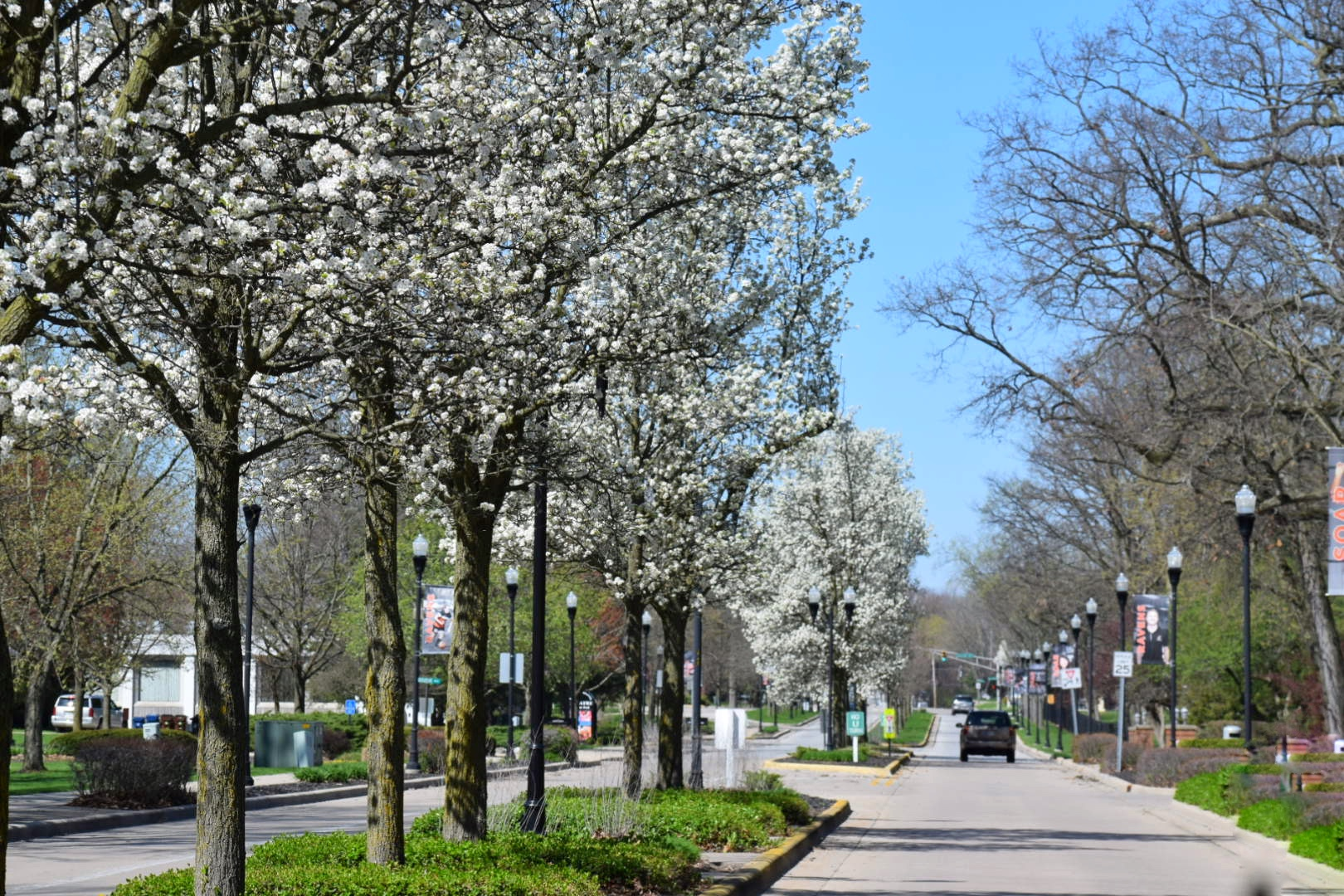

The 100-acre (40 ha) campus is located in Anderson, Indiana at 40.1119864°N 85.6660871°W approximately 40 miles (64 km) northeast of Indianapolis, Indiana.

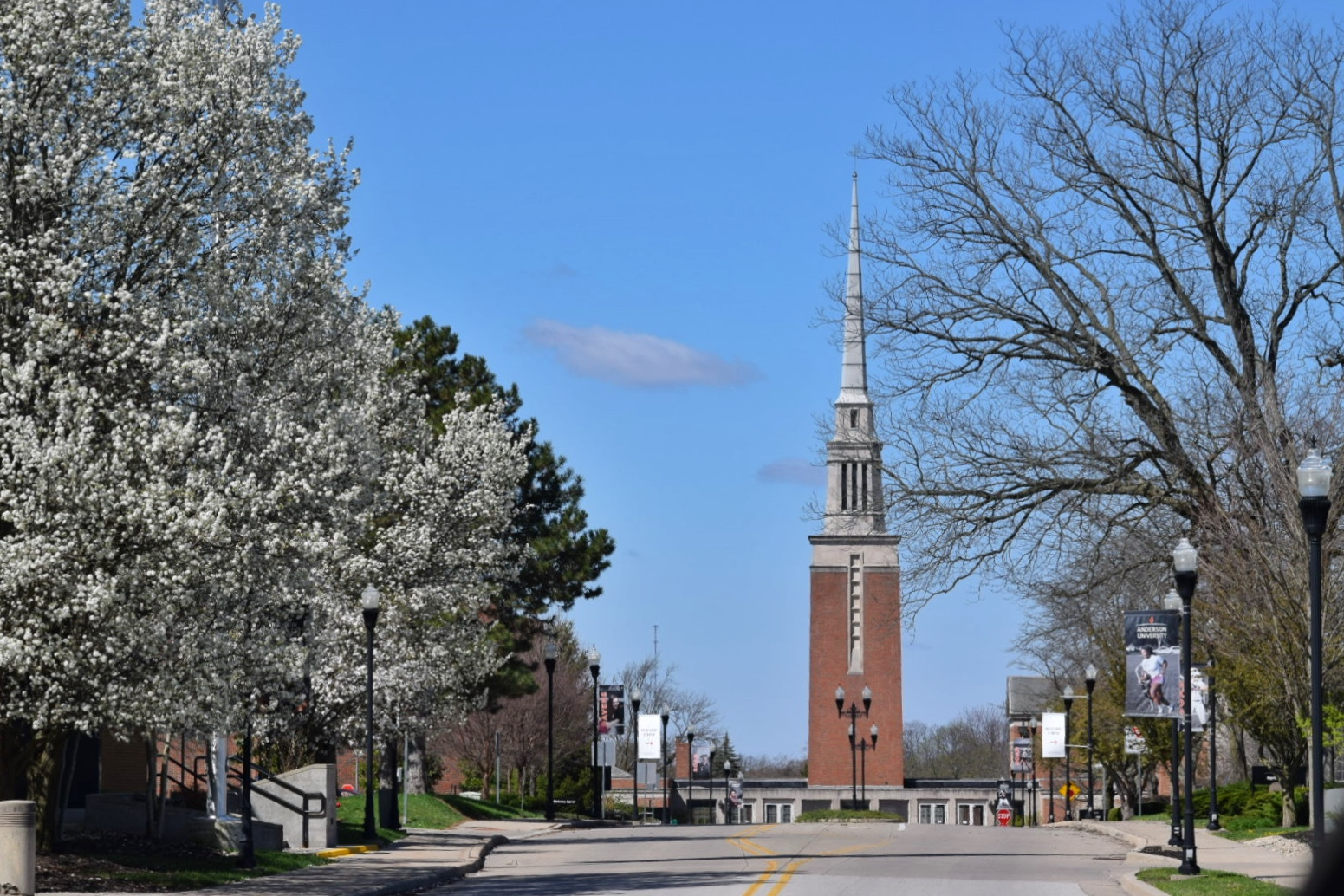

Featured facilities on the campus include the Reardon Auditorium and the Kardatzke Wellness Center. Athletic facilities on the campus include Macholtz Stadium and the O. C. Lewis Gymnasium.

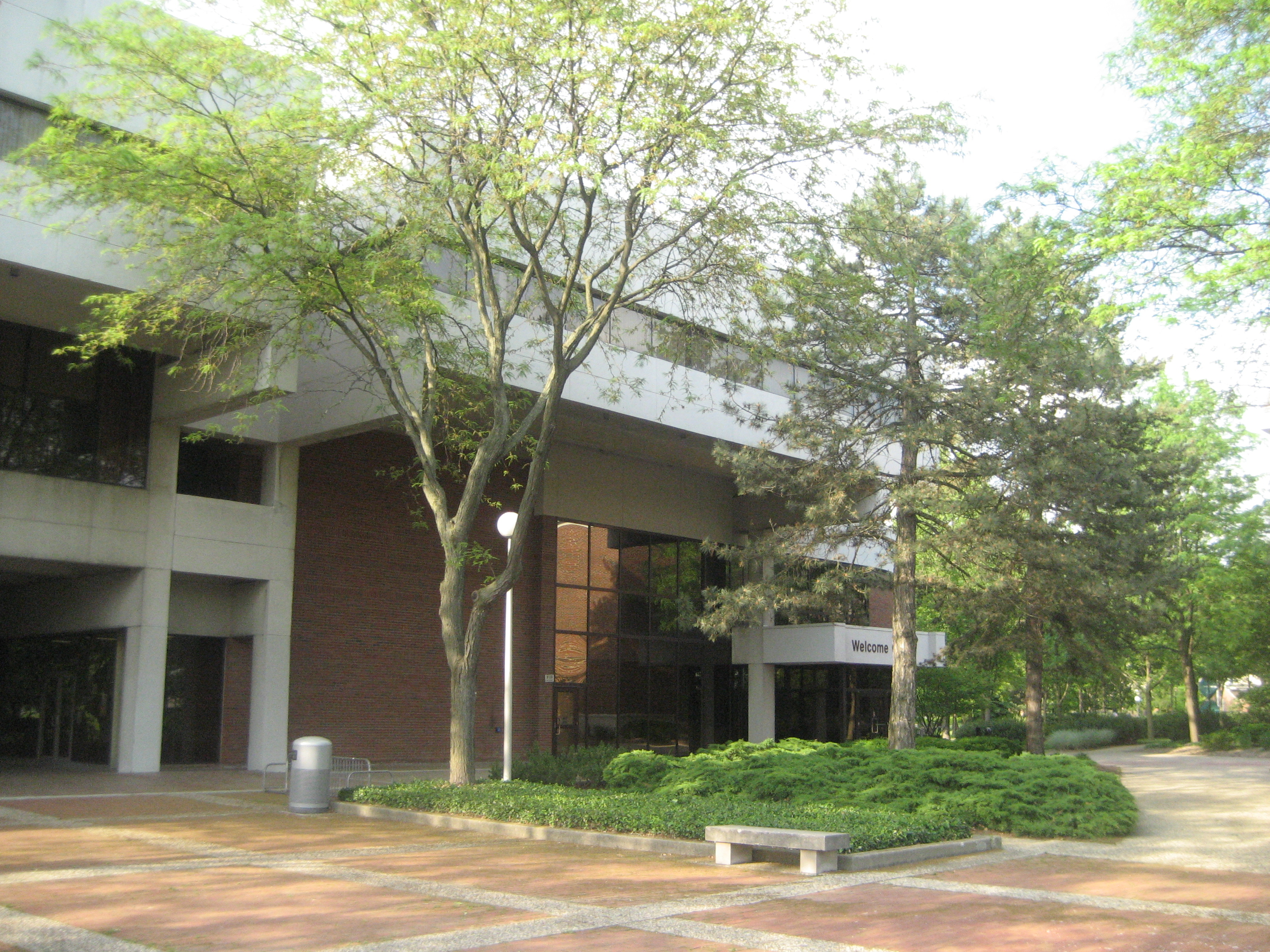
Photo of Decker Hall exterior

=== Indianapolis Colts Training Camp ===
The Indianapolis Colts of the NFL held their training camp at Anderson University from 1984 to 1998. After an 11-year stint at Rose-Hulman Institute of Technology, the Colts elected to return to Anderson, Indiana to renew their familiar partnership with the local university from 2010 to 2016.

== Student activities ==
Anderson University student activities are coordinated by the Student Life staff, the Campus Activities Board, and the Student Government Association.

=== Chapel services ===
Required chapel/convocation attendance for students is an Anderson University tradition, maintained throughout the entire history of the university. Students are currently required to attend 11 chapels per semester to fulfill the undergraduate requirement.

=== Clubs and organizations ===
Anderson University has over 100 organizations for fine arts, athletics, academics, and special interests/hobbies.

=== Athletics ===
The Anderson Ravens compete in athletics in the NCAA Division III and the Heartland Collegiate Athletic Conference. Men's sports offered at Anderson University include football, basketball, baseball, lacrosse, tennis, golf, soccer, cross country, swimming, and track & field. Women's sports offered at Anderson University include basketball, softball, lacrosse, tennis, volleyball, soccer, golf, cross country, swimming, and track & field. Anderson University also offers Men's Volleyball, Rugby, and Men's Lacrosse as club sports. Formerly the Tigers, AU's nickname was changed to the Ravens in 1937. The current mascot is Rodney the Raven.

==== Hall of Fame ====
The Anderson University Athletic Hall of Fame was started in 1997 with 10 inductees that year. Ten additional honorees were added in 1998. Members have been inducted each year. The names are nominees are submitted and given consideration by the Hall of Fame committee. The committee has 11 representatives and is headed by university's Athletic Director. The inductees are announced each Spring and formally inducted into the Hall of Fame at a banquet during the university's homecoming activities each Fall.

Two Anderson coaches have been inducted to the National Association of Intercollegiate Athletics (NAIA) Hall of Fame; tennis coach Bob Blume in 1978, and baseball coach Carl Erskine in 1989.

=== Intramurals ===
- Fall Season
  - Flag Football
  - Ultimate Frisbee
  - Spikeball
  - Wiffleball
  - Volleyball
  - Team Handball
  - KanJam
  - Floor Hockey
- Spring Season
  - Basketball
  - Indoor Soccer
  - Pool Volleyball
  - Corn Hole
  - Softball
  - Outdoor Soccer
  - Badminton

== See also ==
- List of Anderson University (Indiana) alumni
