= Rufe Persful =

American criminal

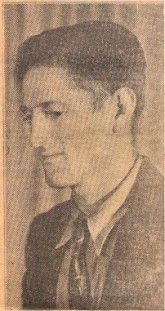
- Persful, c. 1936
- Born: May 25, 1906; Salina, Kansas, US
- Died: May 16, 1991 (aged 84); Santa Barbara, California
- Years active: 1924–1948
- Known for: One of the most dangerous criminal for his era and being physically tortured and beaten by fellow inmates.
- Status: Deceased
- Criminal charges: Murder, robbery, kidnapping

Details
- Victims: 3–5
- Country: United States
- States: California; Arkansas; Washington State; Indiana; Missouri; Georgia
- Imprisoned at: Arkansas State Penitentiary; United States Penitentiary, Atlanta; Alcatraz Federal Penitentiary; Tucker Prison Farms; McNeil Island Prison

Rufe Persful (May 25, 1906 – May 16, 1991) was an American criminal, convicted of murder, kidnapping and robbery. He was considered one of the most dangerous criminals of his era by the authorities.

Convicted of the murder and robbery of an elderly man at the age of 18, he was sentenced to 15 years in Arkansas State Penitentiary, but unlike a standard prison, it involved farm labor. He was given the task of shooting fellow inmates with a shotgun if they attempted to escape. He killed and disabled many prisoners during his time at the Arkansas Penitentiary, punctuated by periods of parole as a reward for his prison protection, and then re-offending and being sent back to resume his role. In December 1934, Persful was convicted for kidnapping and robbery in Paragould, Arkansas and sentenced to 20 years, after which he was transferred to United States Penitentiary, Atlanta. Two inmates recognized him from Arkansas and word spread of his killing of fellow inmates and he began being severely abused.

He was transferred to Alcatraz Federal Penitentiary a year later but was recognized and continued to be tortured by his fellow inmates because of his past offenses. In 1937, Persful attempted to cut off his hands in sheer desperation of his experiences at Alcatraz and was diagnosed with schizophrenia. He was eventually sent to McNeil Island Penitentiary, where he was again recognized and suffered much abuse from his fellow inmates, despite being heavily watched over by the prison staff. Persful was released in April 1948 and moved in with a relative in Gary, Indiana, never to be convicted of a crime again.

== Biography ==
At the age of 18, Persful was convicted of the murder and robbery of an elderly man. He was sentenced to 15 years of farm labor in one of the Arkansas Department of Correction's prisons. He was given the duty of "high power", shooting fellow inmates in the belly button if they attempted to flee from the fields. After shooting a prisoner who tried to escape, his sentence was reduced to 9 years but he was almost immediately released on parole. About 18 months later, he was indicted for shooting a woman in the back with a shotgun, but was never tried. Back at the prison farm, he resumed his position, shot another prisoner attempting to escape, and was paroled again as a reward. After several months, he committed an armed robbery and was sentenced to 5 years in the penitentiary, but again resumed his former position, during which he killed one and permanently disabled three others who attempted to flee. A circuit judge refused him parole, but he was released on parole for a fourth time 8 months after he killed four prisoners attempting to escape.

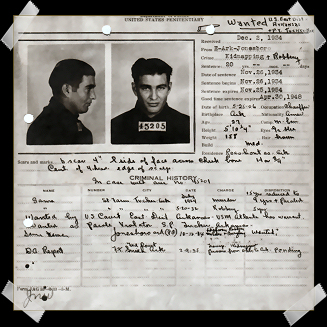
Alcatraz profile of Persful

In December 1934, Persful was convicted of the kidnapping of a nightwatchman in Paragould, Arkansas and robbing the Schug Brothers of some $1000 with his companion Riley Gunn. He was sent to United States Penitentiary, Atlanta to serve twenty years. Despite Atlanta's reputation as a prison where inmates stuck together, two convicts knew Persful from the Arkansas penitentiary, and word spread of his killing and maiming of fellow prisoners. He began being severely beaten and bullied by his fellow inmates. The Atlanta prison officials eventually learned of the frequent abuse and violence facing Persful, and in December 1935 sent him to Alcatraz. However, he continued to be unpopular with the inmates, many of whom had transferred to Alcatraz from Atlanta and knew of his history.

Once he was transferred to Alcatraz, his murder of a pregnant female prisoner was discovered. He apparently killed her to conceal a rape. Once this was exposed by the prison doctor, the issue became a widely publicized national scandal involving murders of inmates by other inmates.

Persful was involved in a brutal fight with Francis Keating, a former inmate of Atlanta who called him a "shotgun son of a bitch". Persful was sent to solitary confinement in D-Block. Persful became one of the most guarded inmates in Alcatraz. Nonetheless, Persful continued to be heavily abused and in fear of his life. In September 1936 he sent a letter to James A. Johnston, the prison warden, requesting a transfer to McNeil Island. His request was rejected.

Persful's mental instability grew while in Alcatraz, partially due to the strict silence enforced there by Warden Johnston; as a result some nine months later he took an axe and cut off four fingers from his left hand. This was done to seek attention and get transferred to the medical center in Springfield, Missouri on grounds of insanity. The guard and another inmate took away the hatchet from Persful and put a tourniquet on his wrist to stop the bleeding. He was said to have grinned maniacally as he chopped his four fingers off. Persful was taken to the prison hospital, where he had to be forcibly restrained as the staff treated him. However, the sequence of this incident is disputed, as it is also mentioned that Persful's fingers were cut off due to his hand getting jammed while closing the workshop door.

In the 1979, Don Siegel-Clint Eastwood film Escape from Alcatraz, Persful's hand mutilation was enacted in the movie. This scene is disputed due to the fact that the lead up to the June 1962 escape from Alcatraz actually took place nearly 25 years later, and neither Frank Morris or Clarence and John Anglin were imprisoned at Alcatraz when the Persful incident occurred. Following this incident a policy change regarding silence was made. As the incident received publicity in the news media, James V. Bennett, the then Director of the Bureau of Prisons, clarified that the incident was the result of mental derangement by Rufes.

In the months following the mutilation incident Persful's mental health continued to decline; he would frequently complain of there being an alligator living in his cell and he attempted to make nooses out of bed linen and towels to hang himself. He was assessed by the prison psychiatrist to have Dementia praecox, hebephrenic type and in January 1938 he was sent to Springfield Medical Centre via Fort Leavenworth. He was known as a "wanton killer" for his murder of six men, his wife and child. He probably killed many more. There is also conjecture that he killed three prisoners purposely because they were black.

He was then transferred to McNeil Island, where he was booed in the dining hall. Days after arriving, word quickly got out of his history amongst inmates. He was closely monitored by guards. His job was to clean cells after the inmates had vacated them, to avoid confrontation. In November 1941, Persful requested a transfer back to Alcatraz. He specifically requested confinement in D-Block, but this was declined due to his mental instability. Several months later attempts were made to place him in a group cell, but his cellmates warned staff that they would murder him, so he was sent back to his single cell. Persful was beaten 18 months later when a fellow prisoner was given access to his cell during his cleaning duties. Persful requested to be permanently locked inside his cell for the rest of the duration of his sentence. The warden declined his request and he was beaten a further two times when security lapsed before being released from prison in April 1948.

After release from prison, Persful moved in with a relative in Gary, Indiana, and was never convicted of a crime for the rest of his life. He died in 1991.
