= Ed Wutke =

American convicted murderer

Edward Wutke
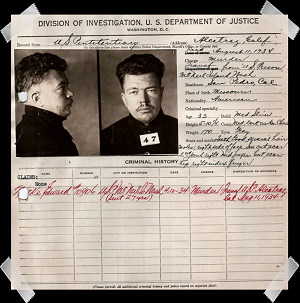
- Ed Wutke file
- Born: January 17, 1901; Willow Springs, Howell County, Missouri, U.S.
- Died: November 13, 1937 (aged 36); Alcatraz Federal Penitentiary, San Francisco, California, U.S.
- Cause of death: Suicide
- Known for: The 1st inmate at Alcatraz Federal Penitentiary to commit suicide
- Status: Deceased
- Conviction: Murder on the high seas
- Penalty: 27 years imprisonment

Edward Wutke (January 17, 1901 – November 13, 1937) was an American sailor who was convicted by the United States Federal Government for murder. He was convicted of murder on the high seas for killing fellow seaman Oscar Newman aboard the S.S. Yale on Christmas Eve in 1933. He had been sent to Alcatraz Federal Penitentiary with a 27-year sentence for murder on the high seas and assigned the number #47-AZ. Wutke was the first prisoner on Alcatraz during its period as a penitentiary to successfully commit suicide. He fatally sliced through his jugular vein with the blade from a pencil sharpener and was found dead in a pool of blood. Wutke died on November 13, 1937.
