= Cecil J. Shuttleworth =

American prison warden (1892–1963)

Cecil John Shuttleworth
- Born: March 24, 1892; Walkerton, Ontario, Canada
- Died: May 23, 1963 (aged 71); Winter Park, Orange, Florida, United States of America
- Occupation: Federal Bureau of Prisons administrator
- Known for: Associate Warden, Alcatraz Federal Penitentiary (1934–37)

Cecil John Shuttleworth (March 24, 1892 – May 23, 1963) was an American prison administrator. He was the first Associate Warden of Alcatraz Federal Penitentiary under James A. Johnston from 1934. Both men were known for their strict discipline and known as "iron men".

A few years later he became associate warden of Leavenworth in Kansas. On January 1, 1942, he was promoted to warden of the Prison Camps/Federal Correctional Institution, Milan in Michigan.
