= Alcatraz Federal Penitentiary =

Former island prison in San Francisco Bay

United States Penitentiary, Alcatraz
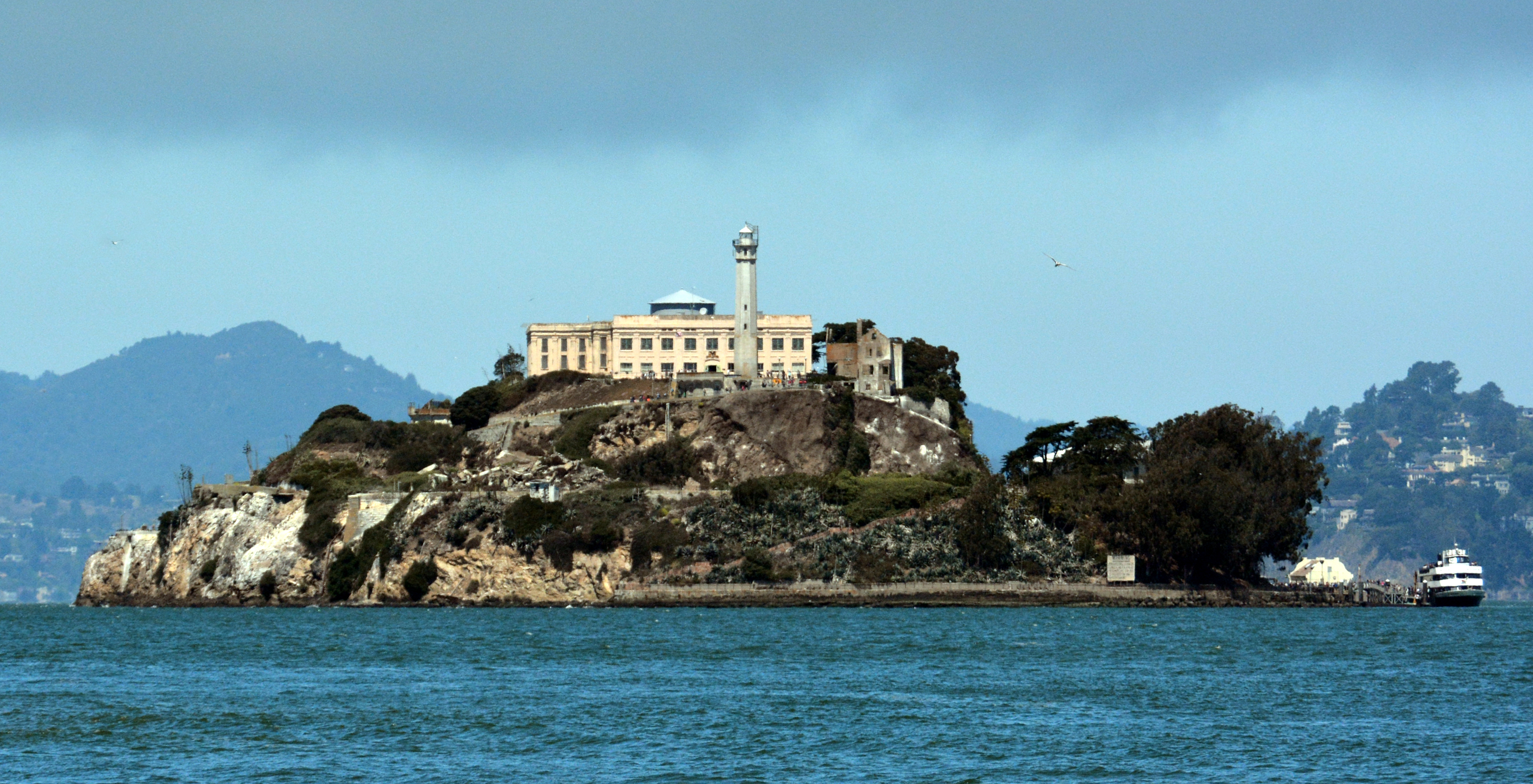
- The prison sits atop Alcatraz Island, 2013
- Interactive map of United States Penitentiary, Alcatraz
- Location: San Francisco Bay, California, U.S.; 37°49′36″N 122°25′23″W
- Status: Closed (now a museum)
- Security class: Maximum
- Capacity: 336
- Opened: August 11, 1934; 92 years ago
- Closed: March 21, 1963; 63 years ago
- Managed by: Federal Bureau of Prisons, Department of Justice
- Director: Wardens James A. Johnston (1934–1948); Edwin B. Swope (1948–1955); Paul J. Madigan (1955–1961); Olin G. Blackwell (1961–1963)

United States Penitentiary, Alcatraz Island, also known simply as Alcatraz (English: /ˈælkəˌtræz/, Spanish: [alkaˈtɾas] "the gannet") or The Rock, was a maximum security federal prison on Alcatraz Island, 1.25 miles (2.01 km) off the coast of San Francisco, California, United States. The site of a fort since the 1850s, the main prison building was built from 1910 to 1912 as a U.S. Army military prison.

The United States Department of Justice acquired the United States Disciplinary Barracks, Pacific Branch, on Alcatraz on October 12, 1933. The island became adapted and used as a prison of the Federal Bureau of Prisons in August 1934 after the buildings were modernized and security increased. Given this high security and the island's location in the cold waters and strong currents of San Francisco Bay, prison operators believed Alcatraz to be escape-proof and America's most secure prison.

The three-story cellhouse included the four main cell blocks – A-block to D-block – the warden's office, visitation room, the library, and the barber shop. The prison cells typically measured 9 feet (2.7 m) by 5 ft (1.5 m) and 7 ft (2.1 m) high. The cells were primitive and lacked privacy. They were furnished with a bed, desk, washbasin, a toilet on the back wall, and few items other than a blanket. D-Block housed the worst inmates, and six cells at its end were designated "The Hole". Prisoners with behavioral problems were sent to these for periods of often brutal punishment. The dining hall and kitchen extended from the main building. Prisoners and staff ate three meals a day together. Alcatraz Hospital was located above the dining hall.

Prison corridors were named after major U.S. streets, such as Broadway and Michigan Avenue, of New York City and Chicago, respectively. Working at the prison was considered a privilege for inmates. Those who earned privileges were employed in the Model Industries Building and New Industries Building during the day, actively involved in providing for the military in jobs such as sewing and woodwork, and performing maintenance and laundry chores.

The prison closed in 1963. Alcatraz reopened as a public museum. From 1969 to 1971, the island and prison were occupied by Native Americans. It is one of San Francisco's major tourist attractions, attracting some 1.5 million visitors annually. Now operated by the National Park Service's Golden Gate National Recreation Area, the former prison is being restored and maintained.

== History ==
=== Construction ===
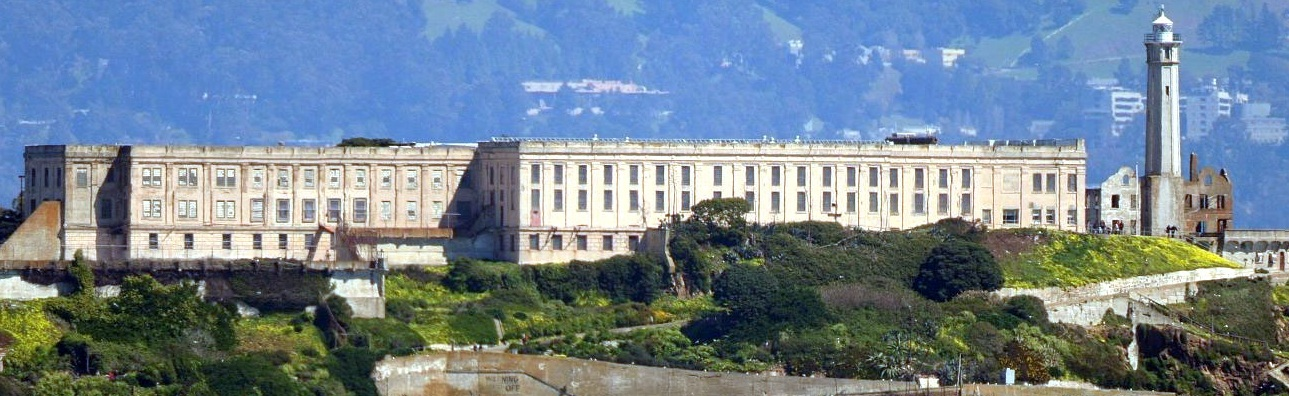
The main cellhouse on Alcatraz

The main cellhouse was built incorporating some parts of Fort Alcatraz's citadel, a partially fortified barracks from 1859 that was used as a jail during the Civil War for alleged Confederate sympathizers. C. L. Weller, the Chairman of the State Democratic Committee and brother of California governor John B. Weller, was one of the first prisoners housed there. A new cellhouse was built from 1910 to 1912 on a budget of $250,000, equivalent to $8,340,517 in 2025. Upon completion, the 500-foot (150 m) long concrete building was reputedly the longest concrete building in the world at the time. This building was modernized in 1933 and 1934 and became the main cellhouse of the federal penitentiary. The building closed in 1963.

When the new concrete prison was built, many materials were reused in its construction. Iron staircases in the interior and the cellhouse door near the barber's shop at the end of A-block were retained from the old citadel. Massive granite blocks originally used as gun mounts were reused as the wharf's bulkheads and retaining walls. Many of the old cell bars were used to reinforce the walls; many placed near the edge were subject to erosion from the salt air and wind over the years.

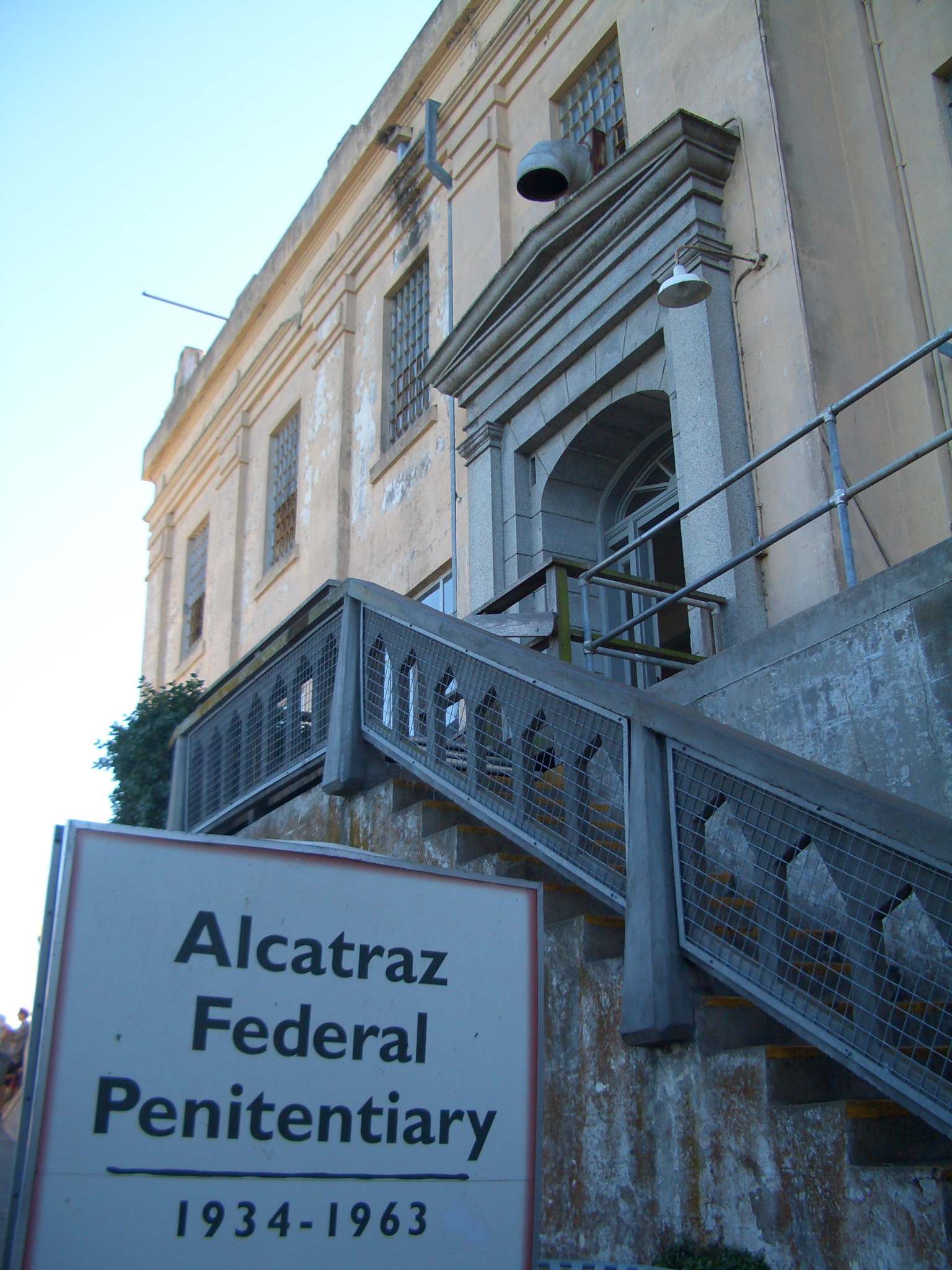
Entrance

After the United States Army's use of the island for over 80 years, it was transferred to the Federal Bureau of Prisons, which hoped an escape-proof jail would help break the crime wave of the 1920s and 1930s. The Department of Justice acquired the Disciplinary Barracks on Alcatraz on October 12, 1933, and it became a Federal Bureau of Prisons facility in August 1934. $260,000 was spent to modernize and improve it from January 1934. George Hess of the United States Public Health Service was appointed the chief medical officer. Edward W. Twitchell became a consultant in psychiatry for Alcatraz in January 1934.

The on site hospital was checked by three officials from the Marine Hospital of San Francisco. The Bureau of Prisons personnel arrived on Alcatraz in early February 1934; among them was acting chief clerk Loring O. Mills. In April, the old material was removed from the prison. Holes were cut in the concrete and 269 cell fronts were installed, built using four carloads of steel ordered from the Stewart Iron Works.

Two of four new stairways were built, as were 12 doors to the utility corridors and gratings at the top of the cells. On 26 April, a small accidental fire broke out on the roof and an electrician injured his foot by dropping a manhole cover on it. The Anchor Post Fence Company added fencing around Alcatraz and the Enterprise Electric Works added emergency lighting in the morgue and switchboard operations.

In June 1934, the Teletouch Corporation of New York began the installation of an "electro-magnetic gun or metal detecting system" at Alcatraz; detectors were added on the wharf, at the front entrance into the cellblock, and at the rear entrance gate. The correctional officers were instructed on how to operate the new locking devices in July 1934, and both the United States Coast Guard and the San Francisco Police Department tested the new radio equipment. Final checks and assessments were made on the first two days of August.

=== Early history ===
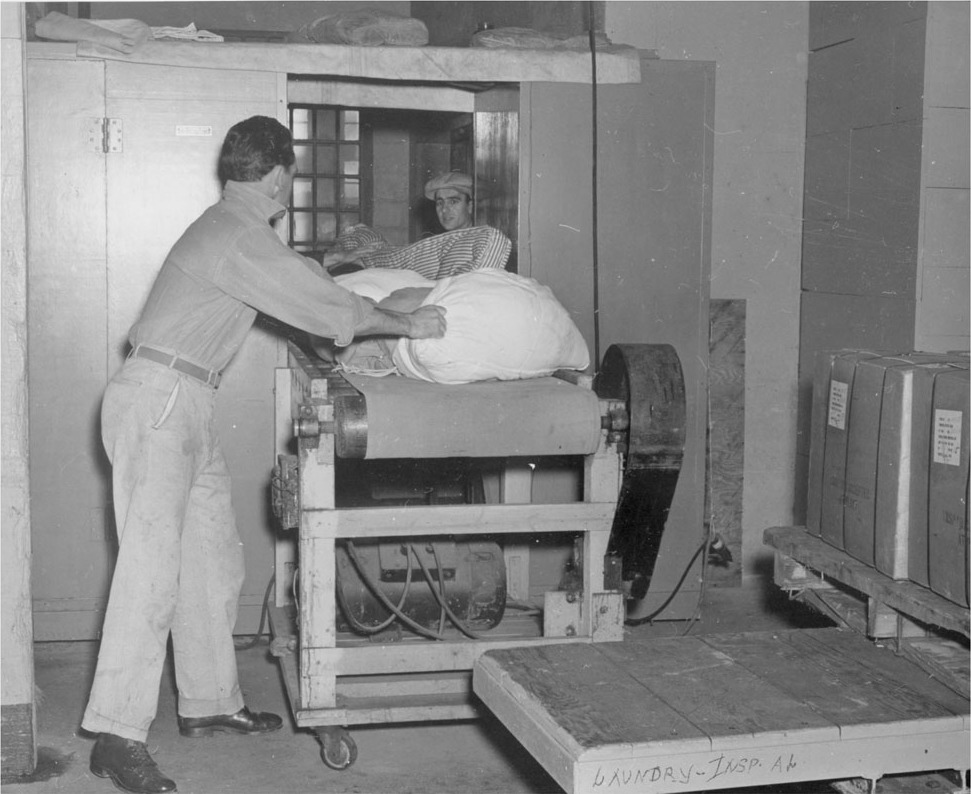
Alcatraz laundry service

Alcatraz was intended for prisoners who continuously caused trouble at other federal prisons. It would be a "last resort prison", to hold the worst of the worst who had no hope of rehabilitation. On August 11, 1934, the first group of 137 prisoners arrived at Alcatraz from the United States Penitentiary in Leavenworth, Kansas, having traveled by rail to Santa Venetia, California. Before being escorted to Alcatraz, they were handcuffed in high-security coaches and guarded by some 60 Federal Bureau of Investigation (FBI) special agents, U.S. Marshals, and railway security officials. Most of the prisoners were notorious bank robbers, counterfeiters, or murderers.

Among the first inmates were also 14 men from McNeil Island, Washington. On August 22, 1934, 43 prisoners arrived from Atlanta Penitentiary and 10 from North Eastern Penitentiary, Lewisburg, Pennsylvania. On 1 September, one prisoner arrived from Washington Asylum and Jail and seven from the District of Columbia Reformatory in Virginia, and on 4 September, another batch of 103 prisoners arrived by train from Leavenworth. Prisoners continued to arrive, mainly from Leavenworth and Atlanta, into 1935 and by June 30, 1935, the penitentiary's first anniversary, it had a population of 242 prisoners, although some inmates such as Verrill Rapp had already been transferred from Alcatraz some months earlier.

On Alcatraz's first anniversary, the Bureau of Prisons wrote, "The establishment of this institution not only provided a secure place for the detention of the more difficult type of criminal, but has had a good effect upon discipline in our other penitentiaries also. No serious disturbance of any kind has been reported during the year." The metal detectors often overheated and had to be turned off. After the Teletouch Corporation failed to address the problem, their contract was terminated in 1937 and they were charged over $200 (equivalent to about $4479 in 2025) for three new detectors supplied by Federal Laboratories.

On January 10, 1935, a severe storm caused a landslide on Alcatraz, causing the Model Industries Building to slide. This prompted a series of changes to the structures on the island. A riprap was built around the Model Industries Building, it was strengthened, and a guard tower added to the roof in June 1936. That same month, the barracks building was remodeled into 11 new apartments and nine single rooms for bachelors; by this time there were 52 families living on Alcatraz, including 126 women and children. The problems with the Model Industries Building and continuing utility problems with some of the old buildings and systems led to extensive updates in 1937, including new tool-proof grilles on the ventilators of the cell house roof, two new boilers installed in the power house, and a new pump for salt water sanitation and guardrails added to stairways.

In 1939–1940, a $1.1 million redevelopment began, including construction of the New Industries Building, a complete overhaul of the power house with a new diesel engine, the building of a new water tower to solve the water storage problem, new apartment blocks for officers, improvements to the dock, and the conversion of D-block into isolation cells. The changes were completed in July 1941. The workshops of the New Industries Building became highly productive, making Army uniforms, cargo nets, and other items in high demand during World War II. In June 1945, it was reported that the federal penitentiaries had made 60,000 nets.

=== Reputation ===
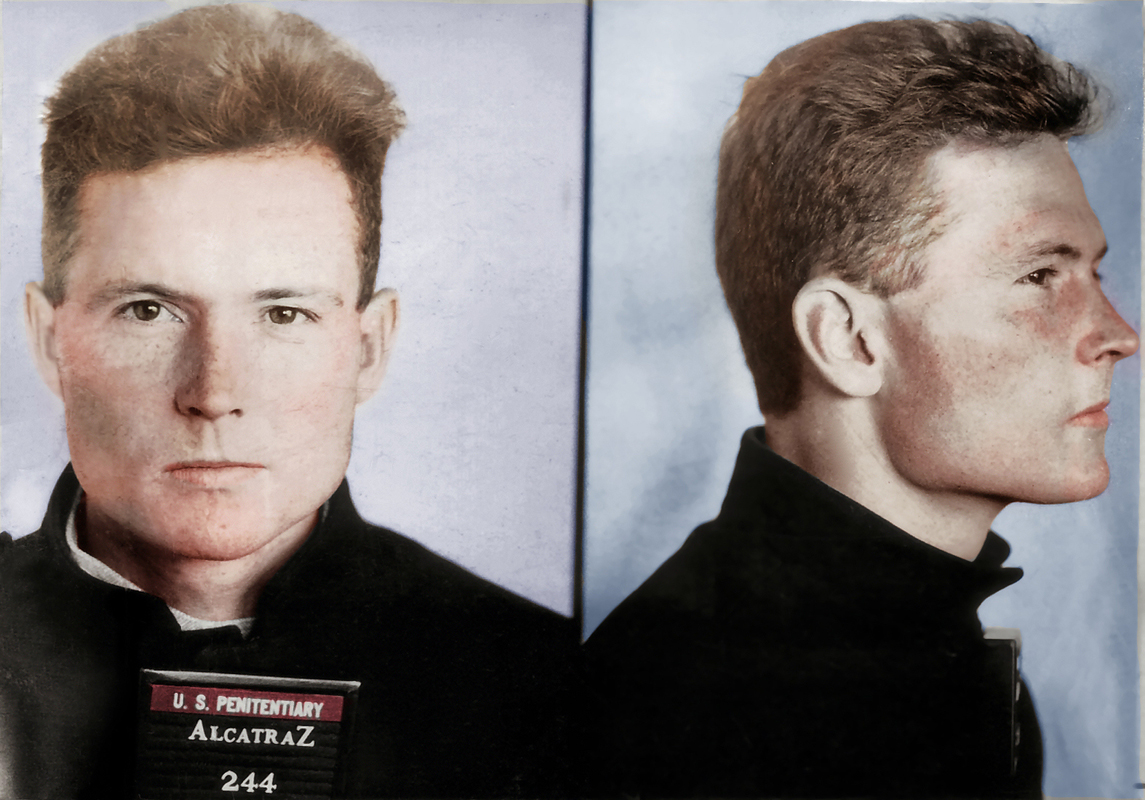
Henri Young, who was tried for the murder of a fellow inmate in 1941

Alcatraz gained notoriety from its inception as the toughest prison in the U.S., considered by many the world's most fearsome prison of the day. Former prisoners reported brutality and inhumane conditions which severely tested their sanity. Ed Wutke was the first prisoner to commit suicide in Alcatraz. Rufe Persful chopped off his fingers after grabbing an axe from the firetruck, begging another inmate to do the same to his other hand.

One writer described Alcatraz as "the great garbage can of San Francisco Bay, into which every federal prison dumped its most rotten apples". In 1939, the new U.S. Attorney General, Frank Murphy, attacked the penitentiary, saying: "The whole institution is conducive to psychology that builds up a sinister ambitious attitude among prisoners."

The prison's reputation was not helped by the arrival of more of America's most dangerous felons, including Robert Stroud, the "Birdman of Alcatraz", in 1942. He entered the prison system at the age of 19, and never left, spending 17 years at Alcatraz. Stroud killed a guard, tangled with other inmates and spent 42 of his 54 years in prison in solitary confinement. Despite its reputation, with many former inmates calling it "Hellcatraz", some prisoners reported that the living conditions there were much better than most other prisons in the country, especially the food, and many volunteered to come to Alcatraz.

On December 3, 1940, Henri Young murdered fellow inmate Rufus McCain. Running downstairs from the furniture shop to the tailor's shop where McCain worked, Young violently stabbed McCain in the neck; McCain died five hours later. Young had been sent to Alcatraz for murder in 1933, and was later involved in an escape attempt during which gangster Doc Barker was shot to death. He spent nearly 22 months in solitary confinement as a result, but was eventually permitted to work in the furniture shop. Young went to trial in 1941, with his attorneys claiming that their client could not be held responsible for the murder, since he had allegedly been subjected to "cruel and unusual punishment" by prison guards prior to the act. The trial brought Alcatraz into further disrepute. Ultimately, Young was convicted of manslaughter and his prison sentence was extended by a few years.

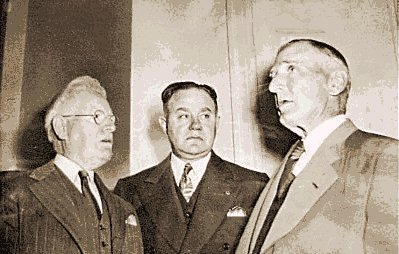
From left to right: Warden James A. Johnston, Associate Warden E. J. Miller, United States Attorney Frank J. Hennessy

=== Final years ===
By the 1950s, conditions at Alcatraz had improved, and inmates were gradually permitted more privileges, such as playing musical instruments, watching movies on weekends, painting, and radio use; the strict code of silence became more relaxed, and prisoners were permitted to talk quietly. However, it was by far the most expensive prison in the United States, and many still perceived it as America's most extreme jail. In his annual report for 1952, Bureau of Prisons Director James V. Bennett called for a more centralized institution to replace Alcatraz.

A 1959 report indicated that the facility was over three times more expensive to run than the average American prison; $10 per prisoner per day compared to $3 in most other prisons. The problem was made worse by the buildings' structural deterioration from exposure to salt spray, which would require $5 million to fix. Major repairs began in 1958, but by 1961 engineers considered the prison a lost cause. Attorney General Robert F. Kennedy submitted plans for a new maximum-security institution at Marion, Illinois.

The June 1962 escape from Alcatraz led to acrimonious investigations. Combined with the major structural problems and expensive operation, this led to its closure on March 21, 1963. The final Bureau of Prisons report said of Alcatraz: "The institution served an important purpose in taking the strain off the older and greatly overcrowded institutions in Atlanta, Leavenworth and McNeil Island since it enabled us to move to the smaller, closely guarded institution for the escape artists, the big-time racketeers, the inveterate connivers and those who needed protection from other groups."

The former prison and island are now a museum. It is one of San Francisco's major tourist attractions drawing in some 1.5 million visitors annually (2010). Visitors arrive by boat and are given a tour of the cellhouse and island, and a slide show and audio narration with anecdotes from former inmates, guards and rangers on Alcatraz. The atmosphere of the former penitentiary is still considered to be "eerie", "ghostly" and "chilling". Protected by the National Park Service and the National Register of Historic Places, the salt-damaged buildings of the former prison are now being restored and maintained.

On May 4, 2025, President Donald Trump proposed reopening the prison for "America's most ruthless and violent offenders". Historians and prison experts said that, while the reopening of the prison would be symbolic for Trump, it would be costly to renovate and maintain; Trump himself said that, if Alcatraz were reopened, the prison would need to be renovated extensively.

=== Escape attempts ===
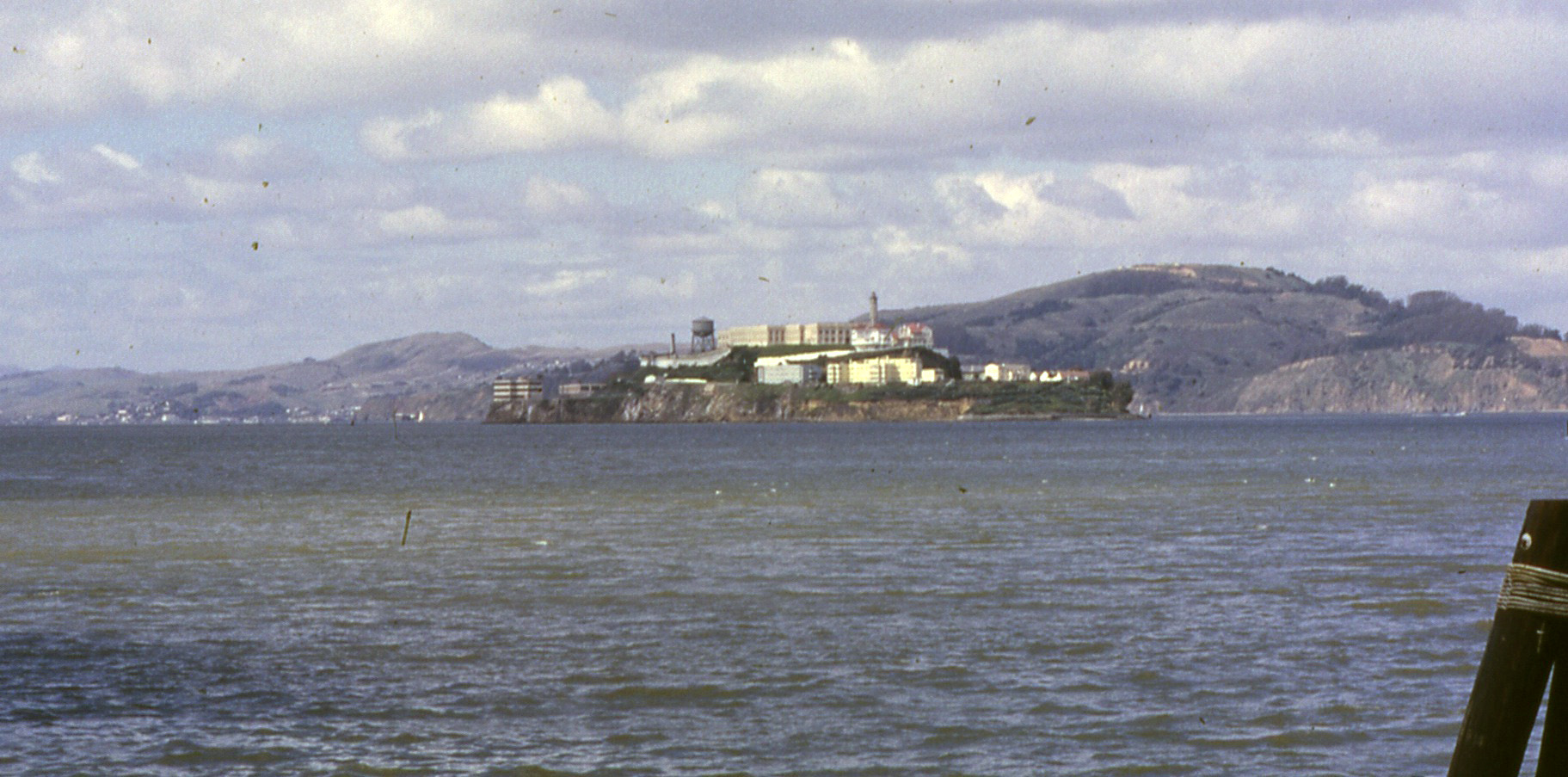
Alcatraz Island from San Francisco, March 1962

According to the prison's correctional officers, once a convict arrived on the Alcatraz wharf, his first thoughts were on how to leave. During its 29 years of operation, the penitentiary claimed that no prisoner successfully escaped. A total of 36 prisoners made 14 escape attempts, two men trying twice. Twenty-three were caught, six were shot and killed during their escape, two drowned, and five are listed as "missing and presumed drowned".

The first escape attempt was made on April 27, 1936, by Joseph Bowers, who was assigned to burn trash at the incinerator. He was scaling a chain link fence at the edge of the island when noticed. When he refused orders of the correctional officer located at the West Road guard tower to come down, he was shot. He was seriously injured in the fall from over 15 m (50 ft) and consequently died.

The second escape attempt was on December 16, 1937, by Theodore Cole and Ralph Roe. During their work assignment in one of the workshops, they cut the flat iron bars of the window and climbed into the bay. It was a stormy day and the sea was rough. Though never found, prison authorities presumed them to have died, assuming they drowned in the bay and their bodies were swept out to sea.

==== Battle of Alcatraz ====
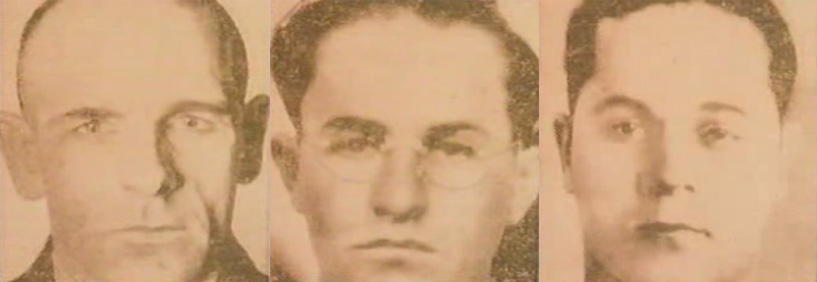
Bernard Coy, Marvin Hubbard and Joseph Cretzer were killed in the Battle of Alcatraz.

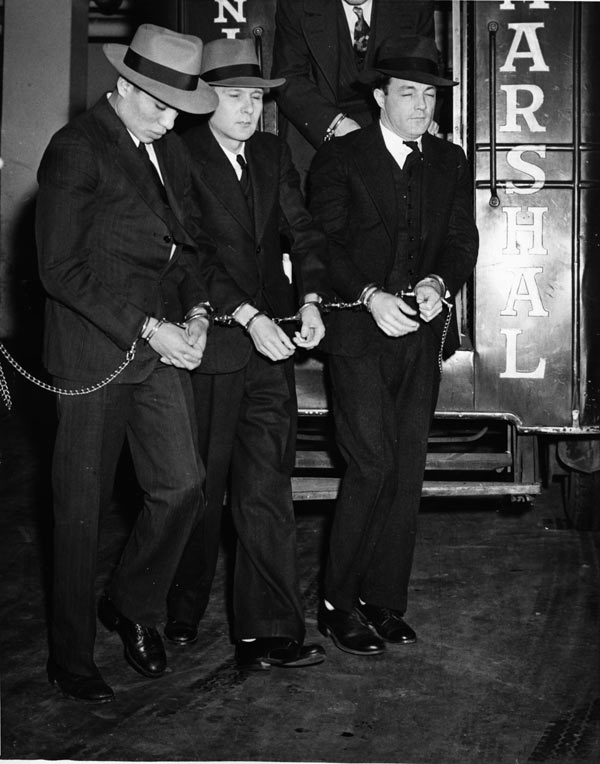
Carnes, Shockley and Thompson on way to court for trial in the Battle of Alcatraz

The most violent escape attempt occurred on May 2–4, 1946, when a failed attempt by six prisoners led to the Battle of Alcatraz, also known as the "Alcatraz Blast Out". Bernard Coy, Joseph Cretzer, Sam Shockley, Clarence Carnes, Marvin Hubbard and Miran Thompson took control of the cell house by overpowering correctional officers, and were able to enter the weapons room, where they then demanded keys to the outside recreation door.

A quick-thinking guard, William Miller, turned over all but the key to the outer door, which he pocketed. The prisoners' aim was to escape by boat from the dock, but when they were unable to open the outside door, they decided to battle it out. They held Miller and a second guard hostage. Prompted by Shockley and Thompson, Cretzer shot the hostages at very close range. Miller succumbed to his injuries while the second guard, Harold Stites, was also killed at the cell house. Although Shockley, Thompson, and Carnes returned to their cells, the other three, Coy, Cretzer and Hubbard, persisted with their fight.

The U.S. Marines intervened and killed the three prisoners. In this battle, apart from the guards and prisoners killed, 17 other guards and one prisoner were also injured. Shockley, Thompson, and Carnes were tried for the killing of the correctional officers. Shockley and Thompson were sentenced to death in the gas chamber, which was carried out at San Quentin in December 1948. However, Carnes, who was only 19 years of age, was given a second life sentence.

==== "Escape from Alcatraz" ====
On June 11, 1962, Frank Morris, John Anglin, and Clarence Anglin attempted to escape using careful planning. Behind their cells in Cell Block B was a 3-foot (0.91 m) wide unguarded utility corridor. The prisoners chiseled away the salt-damaged concrete from around an air vent leading to this corridor, using tools such as a metal spoon soldered with silver from a dime and an electric drill improvised from a stolen vacuum cleaner motor. The noise was disguised by accordions played during music hour, and the progress was concealed by false walls which, in the dark recesses of the cells, fooled the guards.

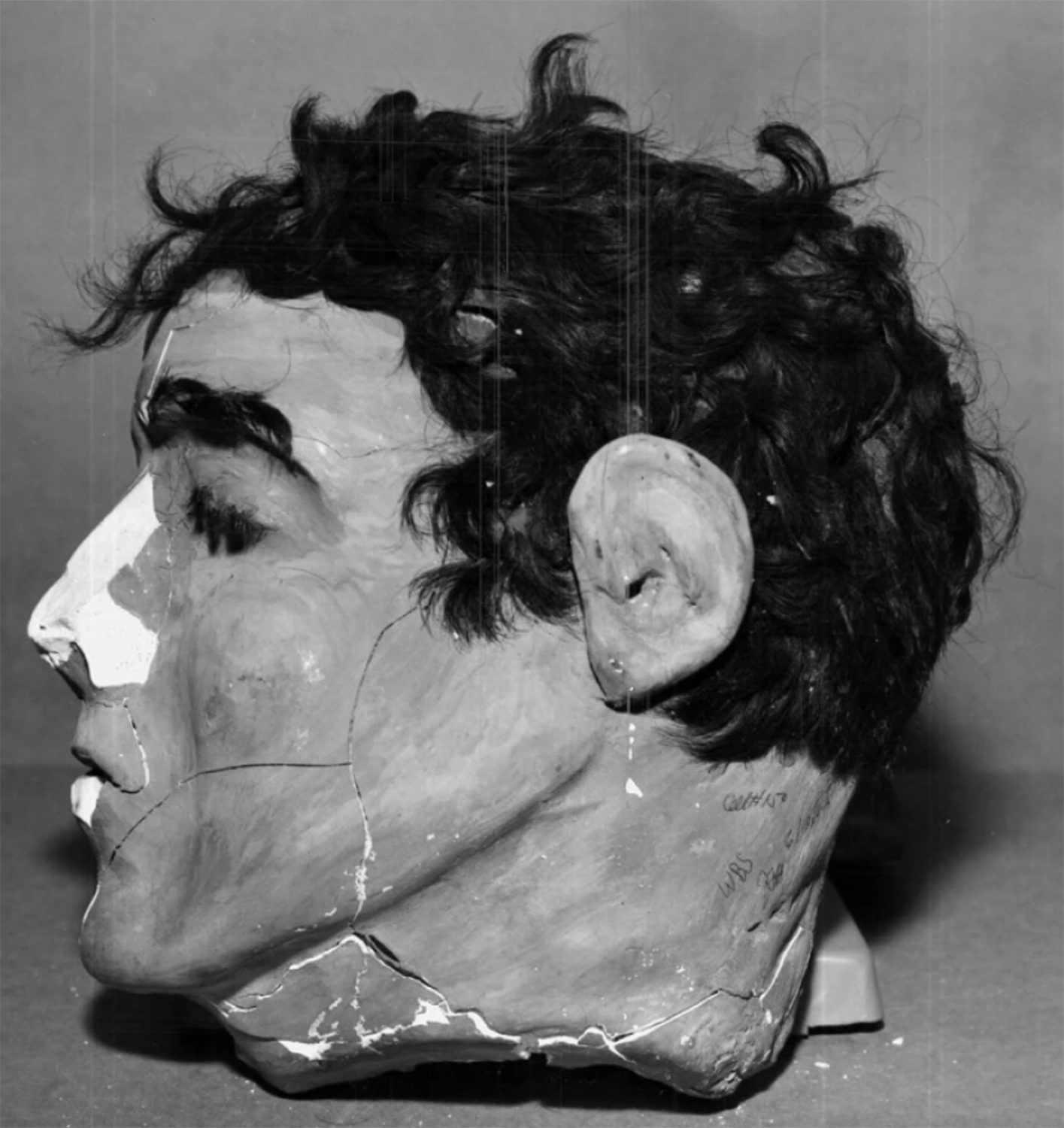
A side view of the model head found in Frank Morris's cell

The escape route led up through a fan vent. The prisoners removed the fan and motor, replacing them with a steel grille and leaving a shaft large enough for a prisoner to enter. Stealing a carborundum abrasive cord from the prison workshop, the prisoners then removed the rivets from the grille. In their beds, they placed papier-mâché dummies made with human hair stolen from the barbershop. Over many weeks, the escapees made an inflatable raft from over 50 stolen raincoats, which they prepared on the top of the cell block, concealed from the guards by sheets which had been put up over the sides. They escaped through a vent in the roof and departed Alcatraz.

The FBI investigation was aided by another prisoner, Allen West, who was part of the escapees' group, but was left behind. West's false wall kept slipping so he held it in place with cement, which set. When Morris and the Anglins accelerated the schedule, West desperately chipped away at the wall, but by the time he got out, his companions were gone. Hundreds of leads and theories have been pursued by the FBI and local law enforcement officials in the ensuing years, but no conclusive evidence has ever surfaced favoring the success or failure of the attempt. The FBI's investigation was eventually closed in December 1979. The official report on the escape concludes that the prisoners drowned in the cold waters of the bay while trying to reach the mainland, it being unlikely that they made the 1.25 miles (2.01 km) to shore due to the strong ocean currents and the cold sea water temperatures ranging between 50 and 55 °F (10 and 13 °C).

The United States Marshals Service case file remains open and active. Morris and the Anglin brothers remain on its wanted list. Circumstantial evidence uncovered in the early 2010s seemed to suggest that the men had survived, and that contrary to the official FBI report of the escapee's raft never being recovered and no car thefts being reported, a raft was discovered on nearby Angel Island with footprints leading away, and a 1955 blue Chevrolet had been stolen on the night of the escape by three men, who could have been Morris and the Anglins, and that officials then engaged in a cover-up. Relatives of the Anglin brothers presented further circumstantial evidence in the mid-2010s in support of a longstanding rumor that the Anglin brothers had fled to Brazil following the escape; a facial recognition analyst concluded that the one piece of physical evidence, a 1975 photograph of two men resembling John and Clarence Anglin, supported that conclusion.

=== Modern preservation ===
In the 2020s, the National Park Service undertook structural and seismic rehabilitation of the Main Prison Building, with approximately $63.6 million in funding from the Great American Outdoors Act. The project addresses structural deficiencies and deterioration caused by aging and exposure to weather and salt air, including work to strengthen structural elements and repair deteriorated concrete and exterior walls.

== Administration ==
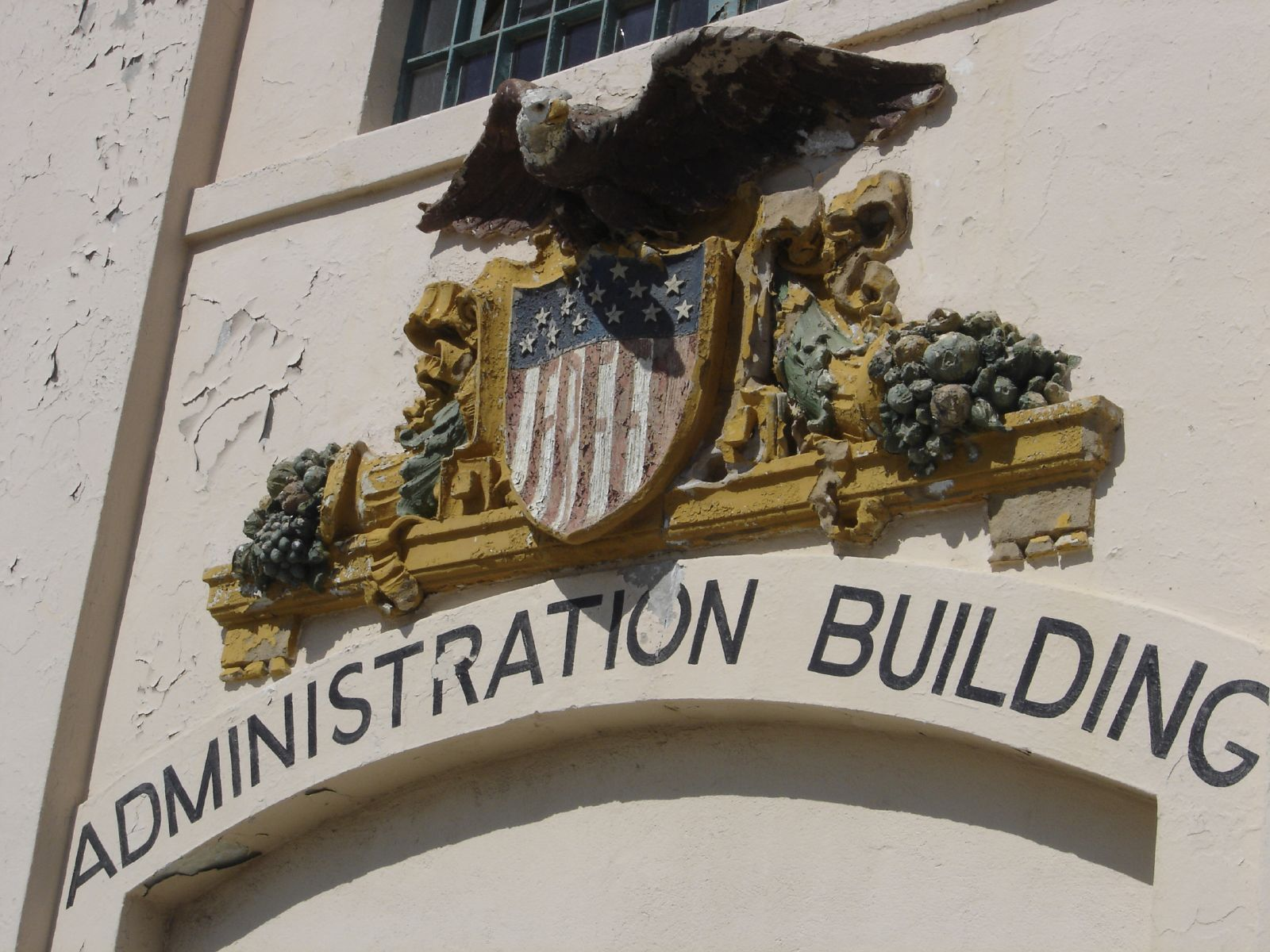
The admin offices of Alcatraz

The prison initially had a staff of 155, including the first warden James A. Johnston and associate warden Cecil J. Shuttleworth, both considered to be "iron men". None of the staff were trained in rehabilitation, but were highly trained in security. The guards' and staff's salaries varied. A new guard arriving in December 1948 was offered $3,024.96 per year, but there was a 6% deduction for retirement taxes a year (amounting to $181.50). The guards typically worked 40-hour weeks with five 8-hour shifts.

Guards who worked between 6 pm and 6 am were given a 10% increase and guards doing overtime had to be reported and authorized by the warden. Officers generally had to pay 25 cents for meals and were charged $10 to rent an apartment on the island, to include laundry service, although larger families were charged anything from $20–43 a month for larger quarters and charged additional for laundry. In 1960, a Bureau of Prisons booklet revealed that the average prison population between 1935 and 1960 was 263; the highest recorded was 302 in 1937 and the lowest recorded was 222 in 1947.

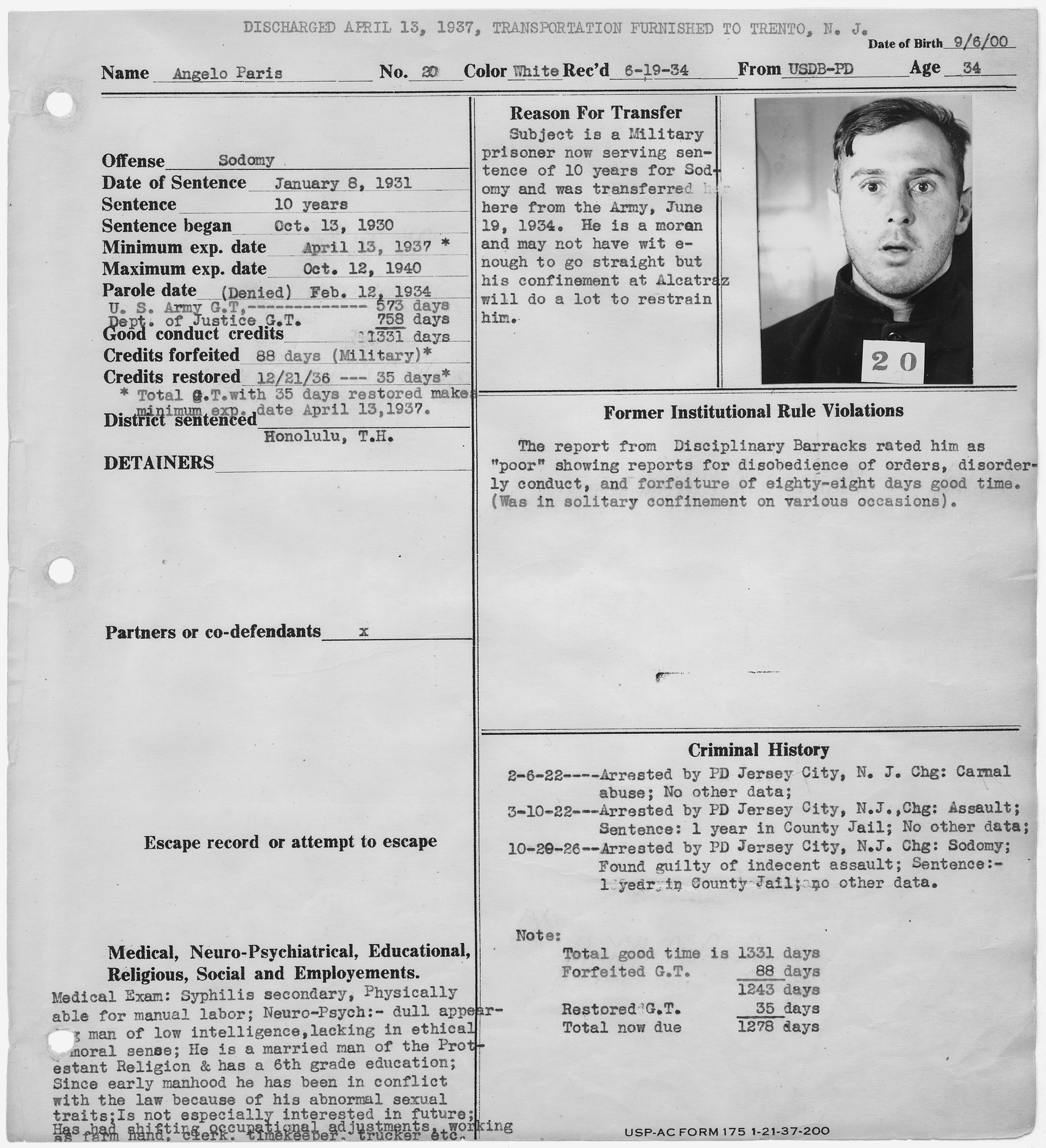
A casefile of a prisoner from the Warden's notebook

The main administration center was at the entrance to the prison, which included the warden's office. The office contained a desk with radio and telegraph equipment, typewriter, and a telephone. The administrative office section also had the offices of the associate warden and secretary, mail desk, captain's desk, a business office, a clerk's office, an accounting office, a control room which was added with modern technology in 1961, the officers' lounge, armory and vault, and a visiting area and restrooms. The basement of Alcatraz prison contained dungeons and the showers. The main stairway to the dungeon lay along Sunrise Alley at the side of A-Block, but the dungeons were also accessible by a staircase in a trapdoor along the corridor of D-Block. All visits to Alcatraz required prior written approval from the warden.

A hospital had originally been installed at Alcatraz during its time as a military prison in the late 19th century. During its time as a federal penitentiary, it was located above the dining hall on the second floor. Hospital staff were U.S. Public Health Service employees assigned to the Federal Prison Service at Alcatraz. Doctors often lasted fewer than several days or months at Alcatraz, because few of them could tolerate the violent inmates who would often terrify them if they failed to be given certain drugs. Prisoners in ill health were often kept in the hospital, most famously Stroud and Al Capone, who spent years in it.

=== Security ===
When the Bureau of Prisons established the Federal Penitentiary on January 1, 1934, they took measures to strengthen the security of the prison cells to make Alcatraz "escape-proof" and improve living conditions for their own staff. Up-to-date technologies for enhancing security and comfort were added to the buildings. Guard towers were built outside at four strategic locations, cells were rebuilt and fitted with "tool-proof steel cell fronts and locking devices operated from control boxes," and windows were made covered with iron grilles. Electromagnetic metal detectors were placed at the entrances of the dining hall and workshops, with remote controlled tear gas canisters at appropriate locations and gun galleries with machine gun armed guards were installed to patrol along the corridors.

Improvements were made to the toilet and electricity facilities, old tunnels were sealed up with concrete to avoid hiding and escape by prisoners, and substantial changes and improvements were made to the housing facilities for guards, wardens, and captains to live with their families, with quality relative to rank. Warden Johnston, U.S. Attorney General Homer Cummings, and Sanford Bates, first director of the Bureau of Prisons, collaborated very closely to create "a legendary prison" suited to the times, which resulted in the Alcatraz Island Federal Penitentiary being nicknamed "Uncle Sam's Devil's Island".

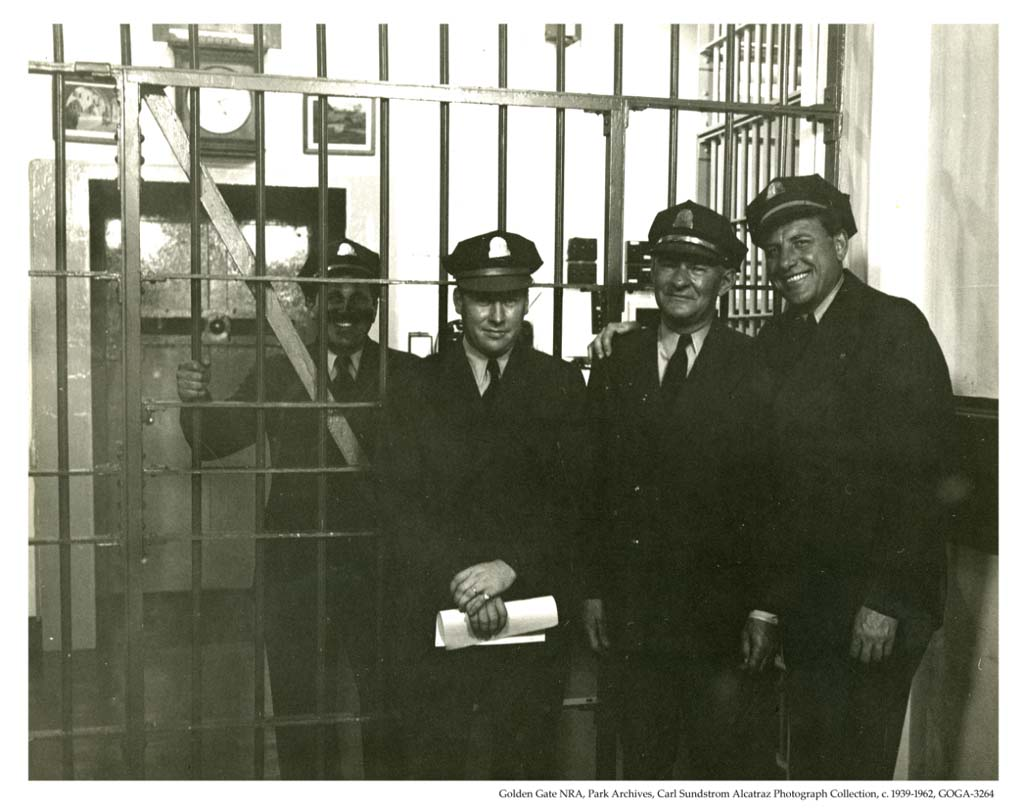
Guards at Alcatraz

Despite Alcatraz being designed to house the "worst of the worst" of criminals who caused problems at other prisons, under the guidelines and regulations set by the strict prison administrators, courts could not direct a prisoner to be directly sent to Alcatraz, however notorious they were for misbehavior and attempted escape from other prisons. Prisoners entering Alcatraz would undergo vigorous research and assessments prior to their arrival. Security in the prison was very tight, with constant checking of bars, doors, locks, electrical fixtures, and other physical security.

Prisoners were normally counted 13 times daily, and the ratio of prisoners to guards was the lowest of any American prison of the time. The front door was made of solid steel, virtually impossible for any prisoners to escape through. The island had many guard towers, most of which have since been demolished, which were heavily guarded at various points in the day at times when security may have been breached. For instance, there were guard towers on each of the industry buildings to ensure that inmates didn't attempt to escape during the work day shifts.

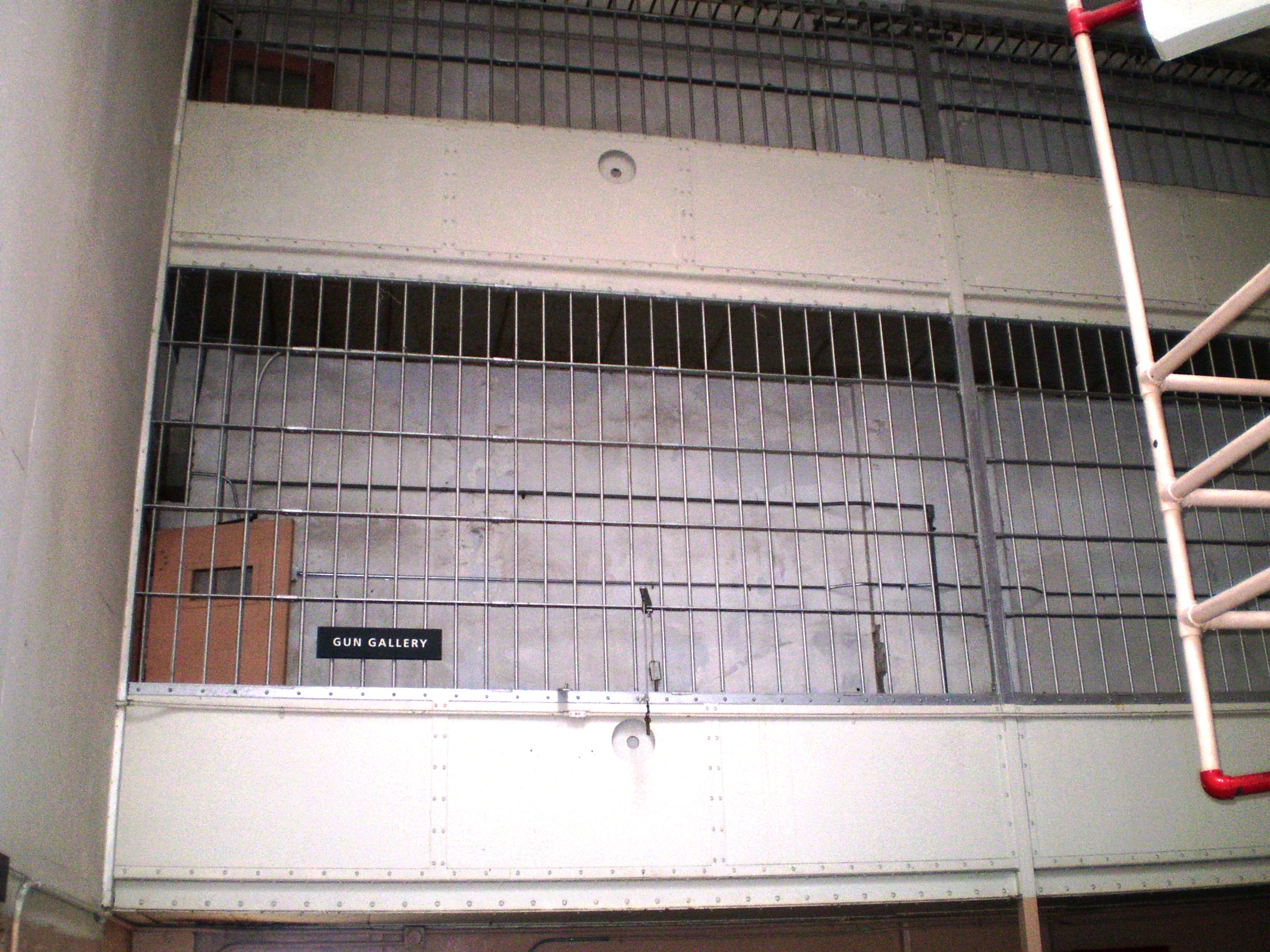
The gun gallery

The recreation yard and other parts of the prison had a 25-foot fence around it topped with barbed wire, should any inmates attempt to escape during exercise. One former employee of the jail likened his prison job to being a zoo keeper or his old farm job, due to the fact that prisoners were treated like animals, sending them out to "plow the fields" when some of them worked during the day, and then counting them up and feeding them and so on. He referred to those four years of his life working in the prison as a "total waste of his life". The corridors were regularly patrolled by the guards, with passing gates along them. The most heavily trafficked corridor was "Broadway" between B and C Block, due to its being the central corridor of the prison and passed by guards and other prison workers.

At the end of each 20-minute meal in the dining hall, the forks, spoons and knives were laid out on the table and carefully counted to ensure that nothing had been taken as a potential weapon. In the earlier years as a prison, prisoners were forbidden from talking while eating, but this was later relaxed, provided that the prisoners communicated quietly.

The gun gallery was situated in the Recreation Yard and mounted on one of the dining hall's exterior walls. There was a metal detector outside of the dining hall for security purposes. The dining hall had tear gas canisters attached to the rafters of the ceiling, which could be activated by remote control, should prisoners riot or attempt to escape. The first warden, James A. Johnston, always entered the dining hall alone and unarmed, due to heavy guarding around him. Several riots broke out in the dining hall during Alcatraz's history. Those prisoners who were not involved in the fighting hid under the dining hall tables to escape possible gunfire.

=== Wardens ===
Image	Name	Term	Summary
	James A. Johnston	1934–48	James Aloysius Johnston (1874–1954) (nickname "Old Saltwater") was the first warden of Alcatraz. The former warden of Folsom and San Quentin, Johnston was instrumental to the creation of Alcatraz Federal Penitentiary from conception to design. He was considered to be a highly strict disciplinarian and a devout reformist who imposed a number of rules upon the prison including a strict code of silence, which led to him being nicknamed the 'Golden Rule Warden' from his San Quentin days. He was relatively popular among inmates and guards, and is credited with challenging the barbaric tactics used in the prison when he was there, including strait jackets and solitary confinement in darkness and working towards the general improvement of the lives of prisoners. In 1937 he was attacked by Burton Phillips from behind in the dining hall who beat him in anger at a worker's strike, but he continued to attend meals unguarded.
	Edwin B. Swope	1948–55	Edwin Burnham Swope (1888–1955) (nickname "Cowboy") was the second warden of Alcatraz. His earlier posts as warden included New Mexico State Prison and Washington State's McNeil Island Federal Penitentiary. He was described as being approximately 5 feet 9 inches (1.73 meters) tall, of slender build, and was a fan of horse racing who dressed like a cowboy off-duty. He was a strict disciplinarian, but unlike his predecessor, was considered the most unpopular warden of Alcatraz with his officers and the inmates.
	Paul J. Madigan	1955–61	Paul Joseph Madigan (1897–1974) was the third warden of Alcatraz. He had earlier served as the last Associate Warden during the term of James A. Johnston. He was the only warden who had worked his way up from the bottom of the ranks of the prison staff hierarchy, having worked originally as a Correctional Officer on Alcatraz from the 1930s. On May 21, 1941, Madigan was the key to quashing an escape attempt after being held hostage in the Model Industries Building, which later led to his promotion as associate warden. He was a stout, ruddy-faced, pipe-smoking, devout Irish Catholic. Unlike his predecessors, Madigan was known for being more lenient and softer in his approach to administering the prison and was better liked by the prison staff.
	Olin G. Blackwell	1961–63	Olin Guy Blackwell (1915–1986) was the fourth and final warden of Alcatraz. Associate Warden to Paul J. Madigan from April 1959, Blackwell served as warden of Alcatraz at its most difficult time from 1961 to 1963, when it was facing closure as a decaying prison with financing problems, coinciding with the timing of the infamous June 1962 escape from Alcatraz. At the time of the 1962 escape he was on vacation in Lake Berryessa in Napa County, and he did not believe the men could have survived the waters and made it to shore. Blackwell was considered to have been the least strict warden of Alcatraz, perhaps in part due to him having been a heavy drinker and smoker, nicknamed "Gypsy" and known as "Blackie" to his friends. He was said to have been an excellent marksman who had earlier served as Associate Warden of Lewisburg Federal Penitentiary.

== Prison life and the cells ==
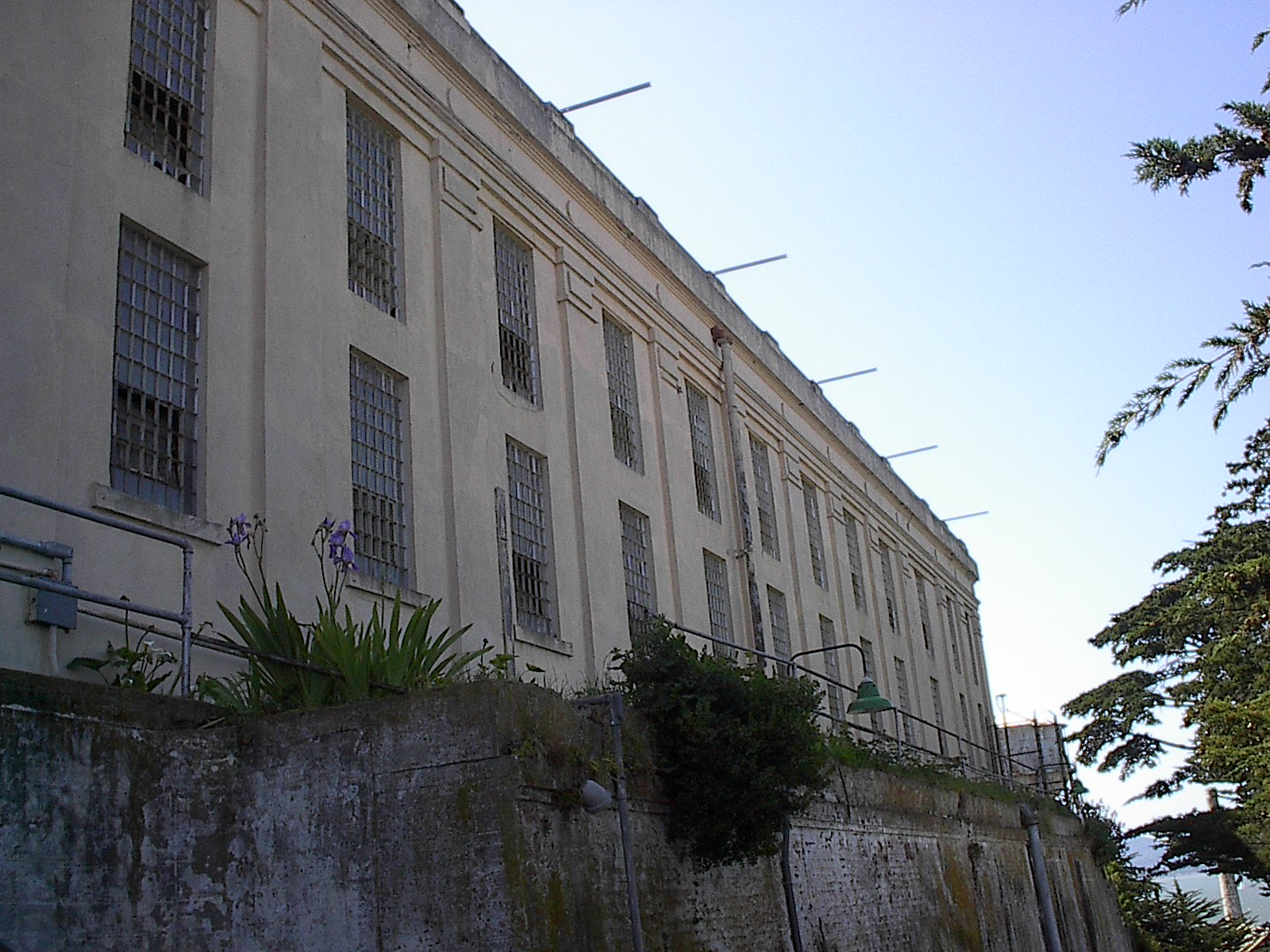
Side of cellhouse

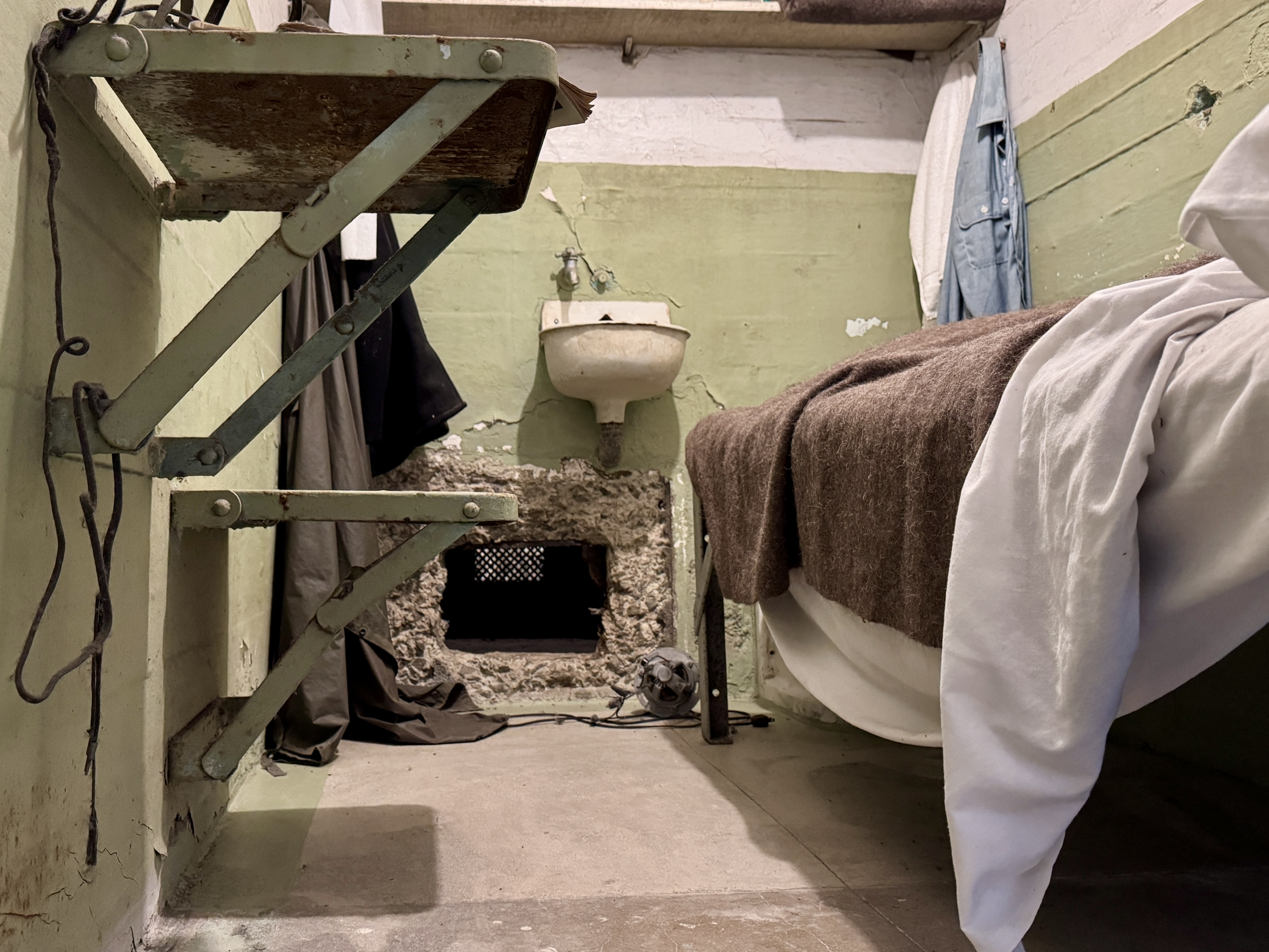
Chiseled cell air vent in Alcatraz

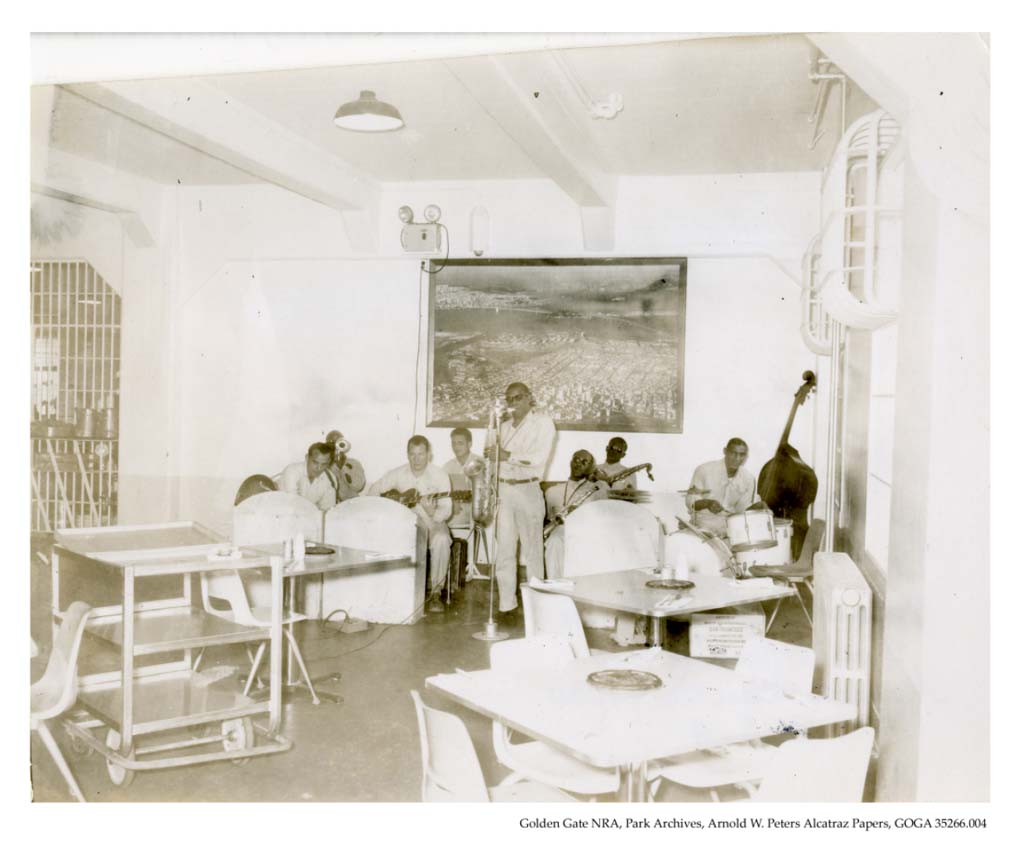
Band practice in the dining hall in the 1950s

An inmate register reveals that there were 1,576 prisoners in total held at Alcatraz during its time as a Federal Penitentiary, although figures reported have varied and some have stated 1,557. The prison cells, purposefully designed so that none adjoined an outside wall, typically measured 9 feet (2.7 m) by 5 ft (1.5 m) and 7 ft (2.1 m) high. The cells were primitive with a bed, a desk and a washbasin and toilet on the back wall and few furnishings, except a blanket. An air vent, measuring 6 inches (150 mm) by 9 in (230 mm), covered by a metal grille, lay at the back of the cells, which led into the utility corridors. Prisoners had no privacy in going to the toilet and the toilets would emit a strong stench, because they were flushed with salt water. Hot water taps were not installed until the early 1960s, shortly before closure.

The penitentiary established a very strict regimen of rules and regulations under the title "the Rules and Regulations for the Government and Discipline of the United States Penal and Correctional Institutions" and also a "Daily Routine of Work and Counts" to be followed by the prisoners and also the guards. Copies of these were provided to the prisoners to read and follow. Inmates were basically entitled to food, clothing, shelter, and medical attention. Anything else was seen as a privilege. Inmates were given a blue shirt, grey pants (blue and white in later years), webbed belt, cotton long underwear, socks and a blue handkerchief; the wearing of caps was forbidden in the cellhouse.

Cells were expected to be kept tidy and in good order. Any dangerous article found in the cells or on inmates such as money, narcotics, intoxicating substances or tools which had the potential to inflict injury or assist in an escape attempt was considered contraband and made the prisoners eligible for disciplinary action. It was compulsory for prisoners to shave in their cells three times a week. Attempting to bribe, intimidate, or assault prison officers was seen as a very serious offense. African-Americans were segregated from the rest in cell designation due to racial abuse being prevalent.

Toilet paper, matches, soap, and cleanser were issued to the cells on Tuesdays and Saturdays, and inmates could request hot water and a mop to clean their cells. The bars, windows and floors of the prison were cleaned on a daily basis. In earlier years there was a strict code of silence, but by the 1950s this had relaxed and talking was permitted in the cellhouse and dining hall, provided conversations were quiet and there was no shouting, loud talking, whistling or singing.

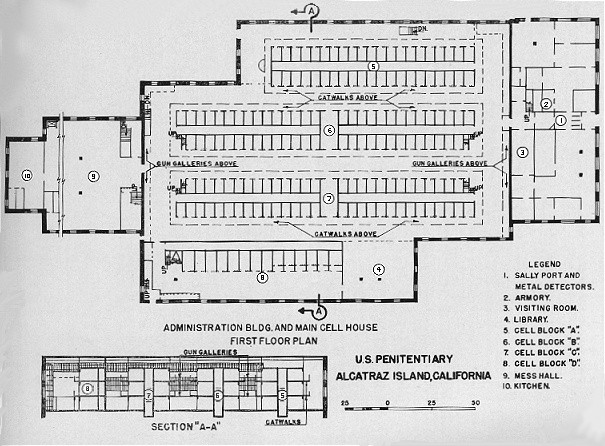
Plan of the main cellhouse

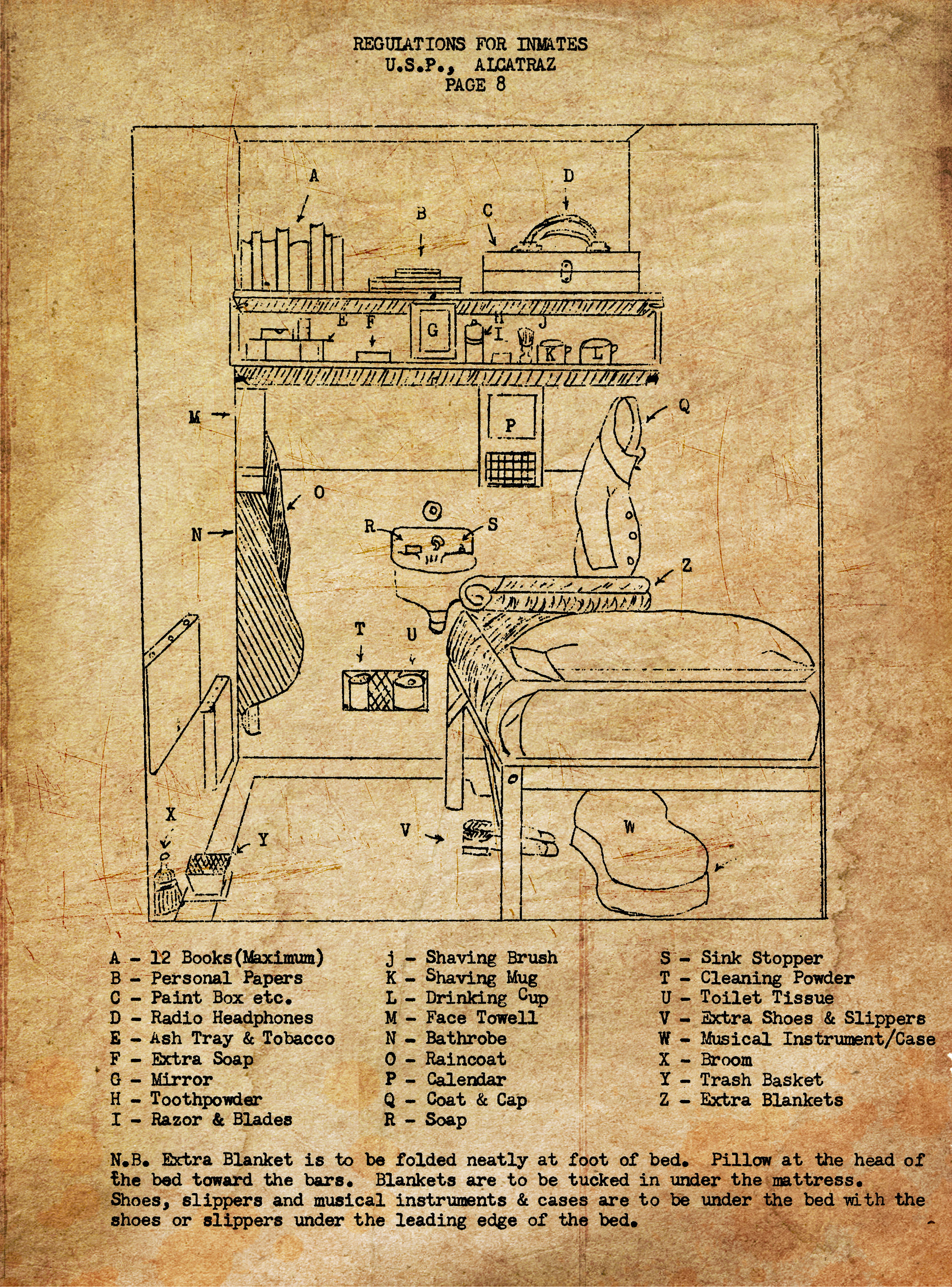
A page from the "Institution Rules and Regulations of the United States Penitentiary, Alcatraz Island" (1956)

Prisoners would be awakened at 6:30 a.m., and sent to breakfast at 6:55 a.m. After returning to the cell, inmates then had to tidy their cell and place the wastebasket outside. At 7:30 a.m., work started in the shifts for those privileged enough to do so, punctuated by a whistle, and prisoners would have to go through a metal detector during work shifts. If assigned a job, prisoners had to accept that line of work; prisoners were not permitted to have money in their possessions, but earnings went into a prisoner's Trust Fund.

Some of the prisoners were assigned duties with the guards and foremen in the Laundry, Tailor Shop, Cobblers Shop, Model Shop etc. and in gardening and labor. Smoking, a privilege, was permitted in the workplace providing that it would not be hazardous, but inmates were not permitted to smoke between the recreation yard and work. Lunch was served at 11:20 a.m., followed by a 30-minute rest in the cell, before returning to work until 4:15 p.m.

Dinner was served at 4:25 p.m. and the prisoners would then retire to their cells to be locked in for the night at 4:50 p.m. Lights went off at 9:30 p.m. After being locked in for the night, six guards usually patrolled the four cell blocks. Many prisoners have compared their duration at Alcatraz to hell and would have preferred death to continued incarceration.

Alcatraz Library was located at the end of D-Block. Upon entering Alcatraz, every inmate was given a library card and a catalog of books found in the library. Inmates could place orders by putting a slip with their card in a box at the entrance to the dining hall before breakfast, and the books would be delivered to and from their cell by a librarian. The library, which utilized a closed-stack paging system, had a collection of 10,000 to 15,000 books, mainly left over from the army days.

Inmates were permitted a maximum of three books in addition to up to twelve text books, a Bible, and a dictionary. They were permitted to subscribe to magazines, but crime-related pages were torn out and newspapers were prohibited. Sex, crime and violence were censored from all books and magazines, and the library was governed by a chaplain who regulated the censorship and the nature of the reading material to ensure that the material was wholesome. Failure to return books by the date given made the inmate liable to removal of privileges.

The average prisoner read 75 to 100 books a year. Every evening, inmates would generally read books loaned from the library and usually an hour or 75 minutes was allocated to the practicing of musical instruments, from the guitar to the accordion. A prison band often practiced in the dining room or auditorium above it. Al Capone famously practiced the banjo in the shower block, although most prisoners were limited to playing in their cells alone.

=== Corridors ===
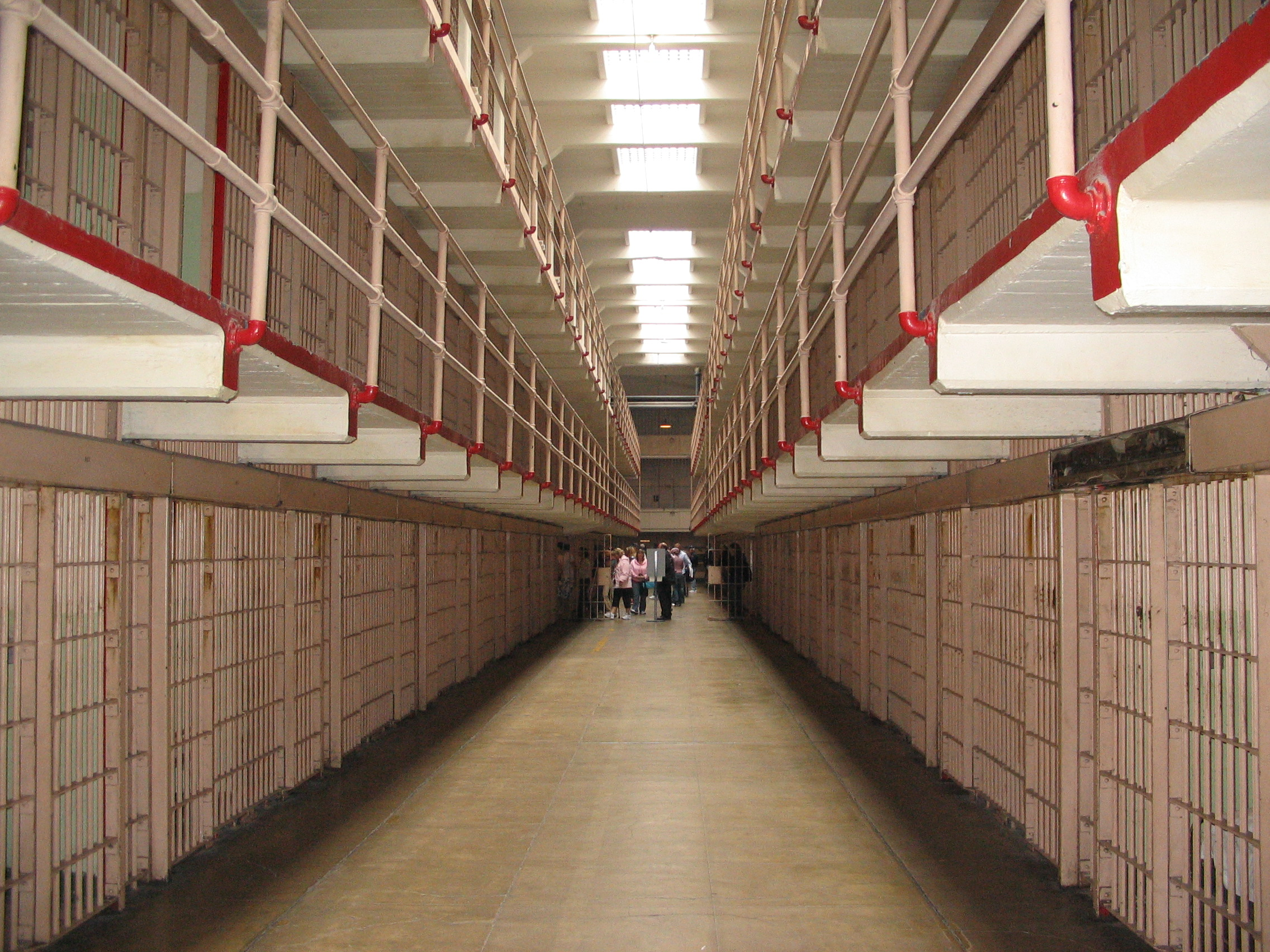
"Broadway"

Alcatraz cellhouse had a corridor naming system named after major American streets and landmarks. Michigan Avenue was the corridor to the side of A-Block. Broadway was the central corridor in which the inmates would assemble as they massed through Times Square (an area with a clock on the wall), before entering the dining hall for their meals. Broadway separated Block-B and Block-C and prisoners kept along it had the least privacy in the prison.

The corridor between Block-C and the library was called Park Avenue. The corridor in D-Block was named Sunset Strip. Gun galleries lay at the end of each block, including the West and East Gun Galleries.

=== A-Block ===
A-Block was never modernized, so retained its "flat strap-iron bars, key locks and spiral staircases" from the original military prison. No inmates were permanently held there during the years Alcatraz was a federal penitentiary. Several inmates, however, were held briefly in A-Block before a hearing or transfer. In the later years, A-Block was mainly used for storage. A law library was set up at some point, where inmates could type legal documents.

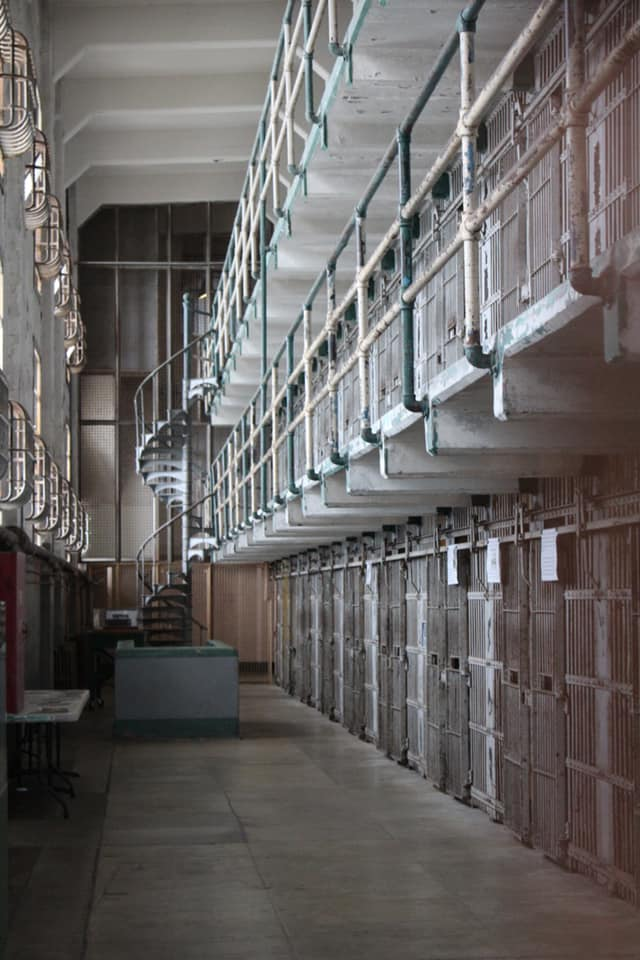
'A Block'

A small barber's shop was located at the end of A-Block where inmates would have a monthly haircut.

=== B-Block ===
Most new inmates at Alcatraz were assigned to the second tier of B-Block. They had "quarantine status" for their first three months in confinement in Alcatraz, and were not permitted visitors for a minimum of 90 days. Inmates were permitted one visitor a month—although persons likely to cause trouble, such as registered criminals, were barred from visiting. Letters received by inmates were checked by prison staff first, to see if they could decipher any secret messages. Frank Morris and his fellow escapees escaped Alcatraz during the June 1962 Alcatraz escape attempt by entering a utility corridor behind B-Block.

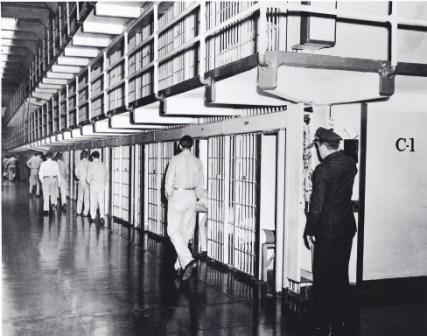
C-Block

=== D-Block ===
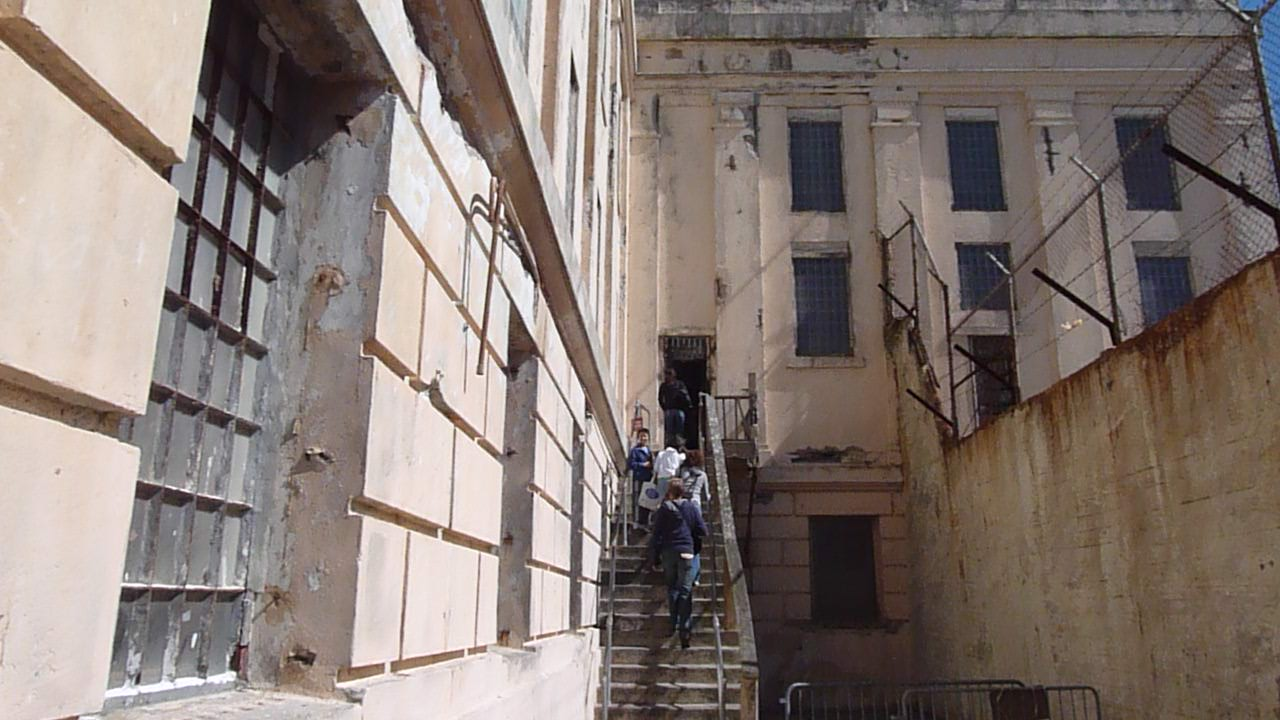
An exterior view looking towards the end of D-Block, the dining hall and kitchen are on the left

D-Block gained notoriety as a "treatment block" for some of the worst inmates, with varying degrees of punishment, including isolation, solitary confinement and strip searches. Prisoners usually spent anywhere from 3 to 19 days in solitary confinement. Prisoners held here would be given their meals in their cells, were not permitted to work and could only shower twice a week. After a 1939 escape attempt in which Arthur "Doc" Barker was killed, the Bureau of Prisons tightened security in the D-Block. The Birdman of Alcatraz inhabited cell 42 in D-Block in solitary confinement for six years.

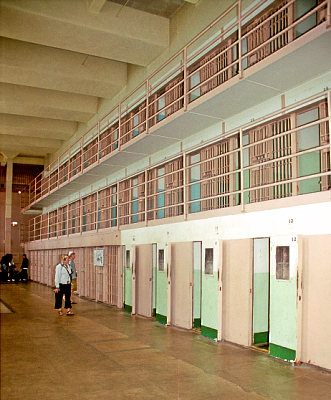
D-Block

The worst cells for confinement as a punishment for inmates who stepped out of line were located at the end of D-Block in cells 9–14, known as "The Hole". Inmates held there were limited to just one 10-minute shower and an hour of exercise in the yard a week. The five cells of "The Hole" had nothing but a sink and toilet; the very worst cell was the final cell, nicknamed "The Oriental" or "Strip Cell", which contained nothing but a hole in the floor as a toilet, and in which prisoners would often be confined naked with nothing else for two days. The guards controlled the flushing of the toilet in the final cell.

After completing the punishment in the Hole, the prisoner could then return to their cell, but would be tagged. A red tag, third grade, denoted a prisoner who was restricted from leaving their cell for perhaps three months. At second grade the prisoners could receive letters, and if after 30 days they remained well-behaved, they would then be restored full prison privileges.

Its size was approximately that of a regular cell—9 feet by 5 feet by about 7 feet high. I could just touch the ceiling by stretching out my arm [...] You are stripped nude and pushed into the cell. Guards take your clothes and go over them minutely for what few grains of tobacco may have fallen into the cuffs or pockets. There is no soap. No tobacco. No toothbrush, The smell—well, you can describe it only by the word 'stink.' It is like stepping into a sewer. It is nauseating. After they have searched your clothing, they throw it at you. For bedding, you get two blankets, around 5 in the evening. You have no shoes, no bed, no mattress—nothing but the four damp walls and two blankets. The walls are painted black. Once a day I got three slices of bread—no—that is an error. Some days I got four slices. I got one meal in five days, and nothing but bread in between. In the entire thirteen days I was there, I got two meals [...] I have seen but one man get a bath in solitary confinement, in all the time that I have been there. That man had a bucket of cold water thrown over him.

— Henri Young testifying his experiences in "The Hole" at Alcatraz during his 1941 trial.

=== Dining ===
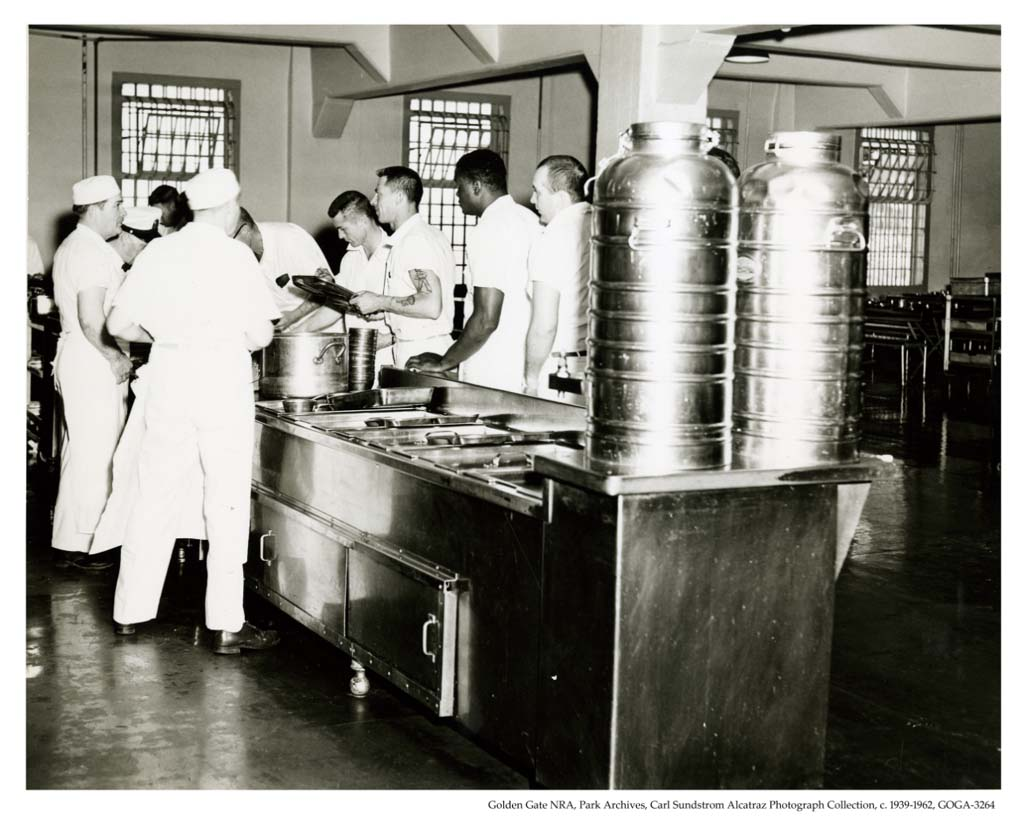
Inmates in the dining hall

Alcatraz Dining Hall, often referred to as the Mess Hall, is the dining hall where the prisoners and staff ate their meals. It is a long wing on the west end of the Main Cellhouse of Alcatraz, situated in the center of the island. It is connected to the block by a corridor known as "Times Square", as it passes beneath a large clock approaching the entrance way to the dining hall. This wing includes the dining hall and the kitchen beyond it. On the second floor were the hospital and the auditorium, which was where movies were screened to the inmates on weekends.

Dining hall protocol was a scripted process, including a whistle system to indicate which block and tier of men would move into and out of the hall at any given time, who sat where, where to place hands, and when to start eating. Prisoners would be awakened at 6:30 am, and sent to breakfast at 6:55 am. A breakfast menu is still preserved on the hallway board, dated March 21, 1963. The breakfast menu included assorted dry cereals, steamed whole wheat, a scrambled egg, milk, stewed fruit, toast, bread, and butter. Lunch was served in the dining hall at 11:20 am, followed by a 30-minute rest in the cell, before returning to work until 16:15.

Dinner was served at 16:25 and the prisoners would then go to their cells at 16:50 to be locked in for the night. Inmates were permitted to eat as much as they liked within 20 minutes, provided they left no waste. Waste would be reported and made the prisoner subject to removal of privileges if they made a habit of it.

Each dining table had benches which held up to six men, although smaller tables and chairs later replaced these which seated four. All of the prison population, including the guards and officials would dine together, thus seating over 250 people. The food served at Alcatraz was reportedly the best in the United States prison system.

=== Recreation ===
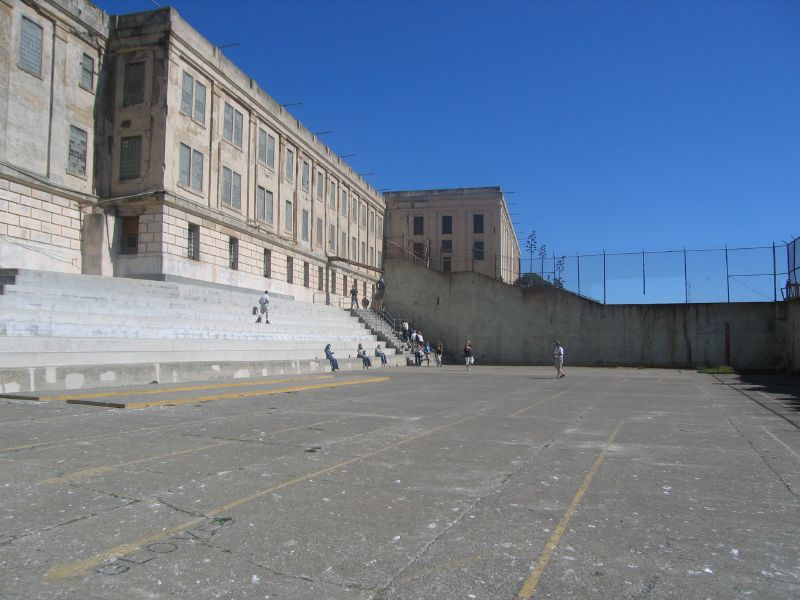
Recreation Yard

The Recreation Yard was the yard used by inmates of the prison between 1934 and 1963. It is located opposite the dining hall south of the end of D-Block, facing the mainland on a raised level surrounded by a high wall and fence above it. Guard Tower #3 lay just to the west of the yard. The gun gallery was situated in the yard, mounted on one of the dining hall's exterior walls.

In 1936, the previously dirt-covered yard was paved. The yard was part of the most violent escape attempt from Alcatraz in May 1946 when a group of inmates hatched a plot to obtain the key into the recreation yard, kill the tower guards, take hostages, and use them as shields to reach the dock.

Inmates were permitted out into the yard on Saturdays and Sundays and on holidays for a maximum of 5 hours. Inmates who worked seven days a week in the kitchen were rewarded with short yard breaks during the weekdays. Badly behaved prisoners were liable to having their yard access rights taken away from them on weekends. The prisoners of Alcatraz were permitted to play games such as baseball, softball and other sports at these times and intellectual games such as chess.

Because of the small size of the yard and the diamond at the end of it, a section of the wall behind the first base had to be padded to cushion the impact of inmates overrunning it. Inmates were provided gloves, bats, and balls, but no sport uniforms. In 1938, there were four amateur teams, the Bees, Oaks, Oilers, and Seals, named after Minor League clubs, and four league teams named after Major League clubs, the Cardinals, Cubs, Giants, and Tigers. Many of the inmates used weekends in the yards to converse with each other and discuss crime, the only real opportunities they had during the week for a durable conversation.

== Other buildings ==
=== Warden's House ===
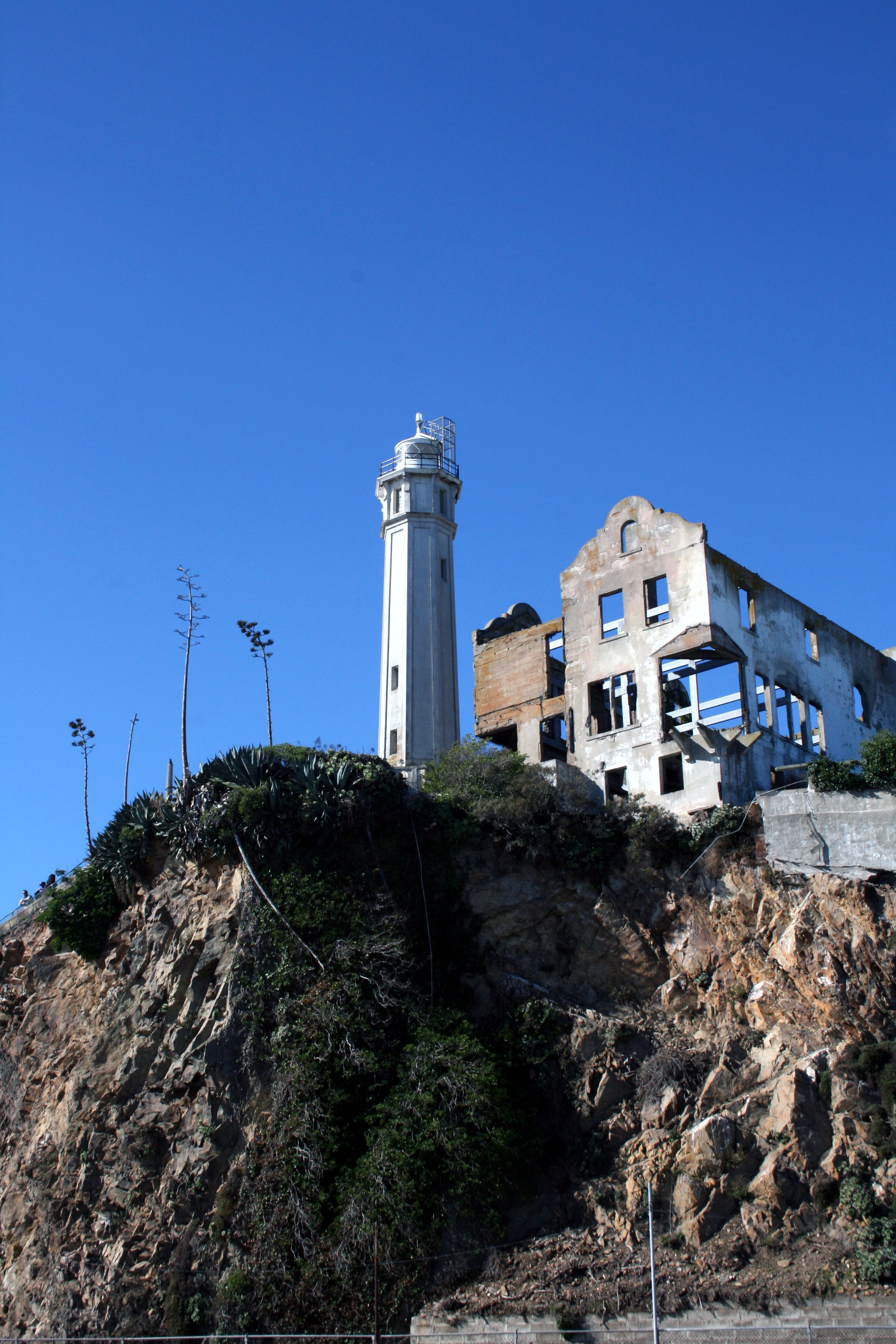
The Warden's House and lighthouse

The Warden's House is located at the northeastern end of the Main Cellblock, next to Alcatraz Island Lighthouse. The 3-floor 15-room mansion was built in 1921 according to the Golden Gate National Recreational Area signpost, although some sources say it was built in 1926 or 1929 and had 17 or 18 rooms.

Between 1934 and 1963, the four wardens of Alcatraz resided here, including the first warden, James A. Johnston. A house of luxury, in stark contrast to the jail next to it, the wardens often held lavish cocktail parties here. The signpost at the spot shows a photograph of a trusted inmate doing chores at the house for the warden and that the house had a terraced garden and greenhouse. The mansion had tall windows, providing fine views of San Francisco Bay. Today, the house is a ruin, burned down by Native Americans during the Occupation of Alcatraz on June 1, 1970.

=== Building 64 ===
Building 64 Residential Apartments was the first building constructed on the island of Alcatraz, intended entirely for the purpose of accommodating the military officers and their families living on the island. Located next to the dock on the southeastern side of the island, below the Warden's House, the three-story apartment block was built in 1905 on the site of a U.S. Army barracks which had been there from the 1860s. It functioned as the Military Guard Barracks from 1906 until 1933. One of its largest apartments in the southwest corner was known as the "Cow Palace" and a nearby alleyway was known as "Chinatown".

=== Social Hall ===
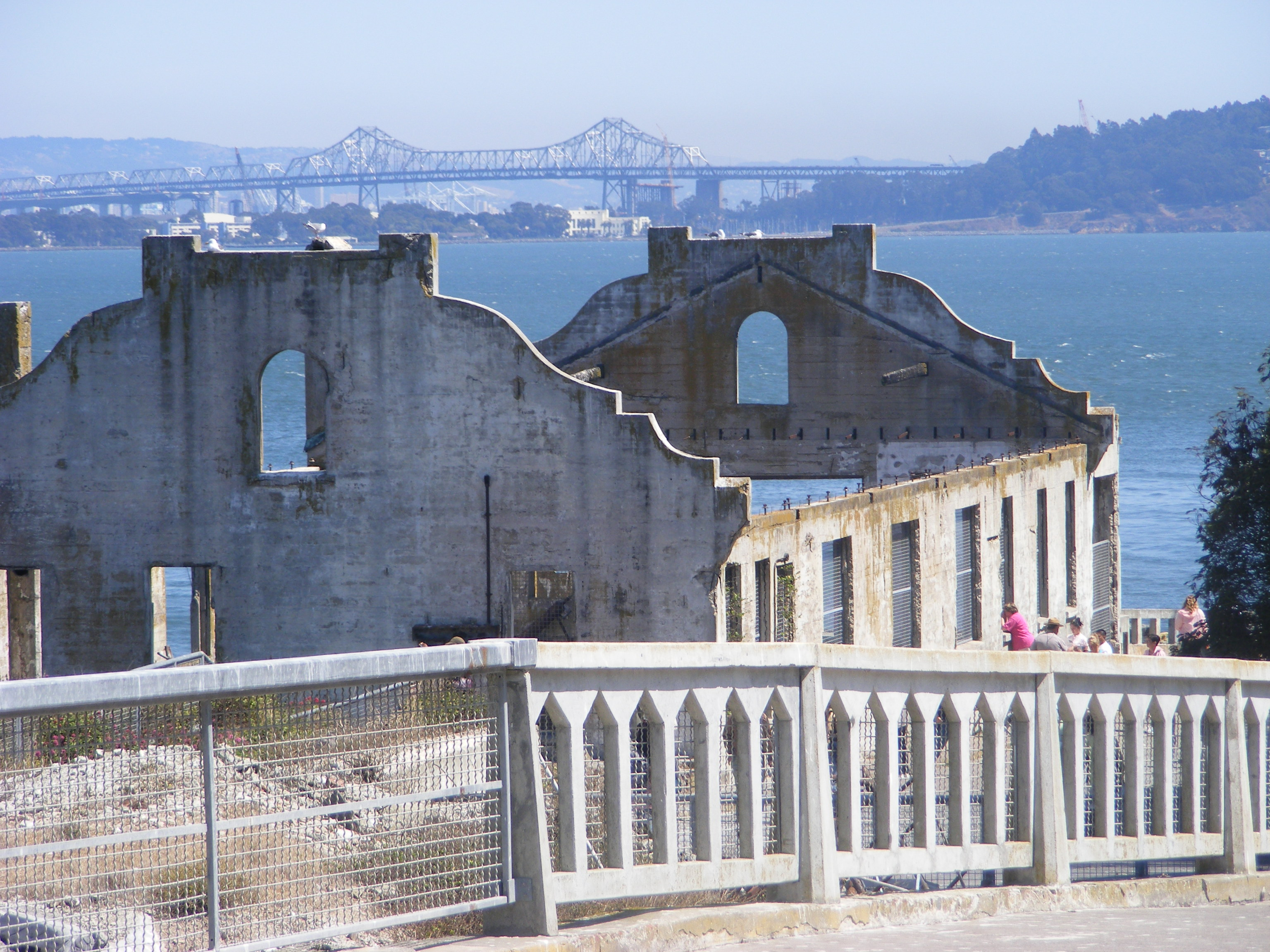
The ruined Social Hall of Alcatraz

The Social Hall, also known as the Officers' Club, was a social club located on the northwestern side of the island. Located in proximity to the Power House, water tower and Former Military Chapel (Bachelor Quarters), it formerly housed the post exchange. The club was a social venue for the Federal Penitentiary workers and their families on the island to unwind after locking up Alcatraz's criminals at 17:30. It was burned down by Native Americans during the Occupation of Alcatraz in 1970, leaving a shell which still remains.

The club had a small bar, library, large dining and dance floor, billiards table, ping pong table and a two-lane bowling alley, and was the centre of social life on the island for the employees of the penitentiary. It regularly hosted dinners, bingo events, and from the 1940s onwards showed movies every Sunday night after they had been shown to the inmates during the day on Saturday and Sunday. The club was responsible for organizing numerous special events on the island (held either in the hall or the Parade Grounds) and the fundraising associated with it, anything from ice cream and watermelon feasts to Halloween fancy dress and Christmas parties.

=== Power House ===
The Power House is located on the northwest coast of Alcatraz Island. It was constructed in 1939 for $186,000 as part of a $1.1 million modernization scheme which also included the water tower, New Industries Building, officers quarters and remodeling of the D-block. The white powerhouse smokestack and lighthouse were said to give an "appearance of a ship's mast on either side of the island". A sign reading "A Warning. Keep Off. Only Government permitted within 200 yards" lay in front of the powerhouse to deter people landing on the island at the point.

Between 1939 and 1963, it supplied power to the Federal Penitentiary and other buildings on the island. The powerhouse had a tower duty station which was guarded with a "30-caliber Winchester rifle with 50 rounds of ammunition, a 1911 semiautomatic pistol with three seven-round magazines, three gas grenades, and a gas mask".

=== Alcatraz water tower ===
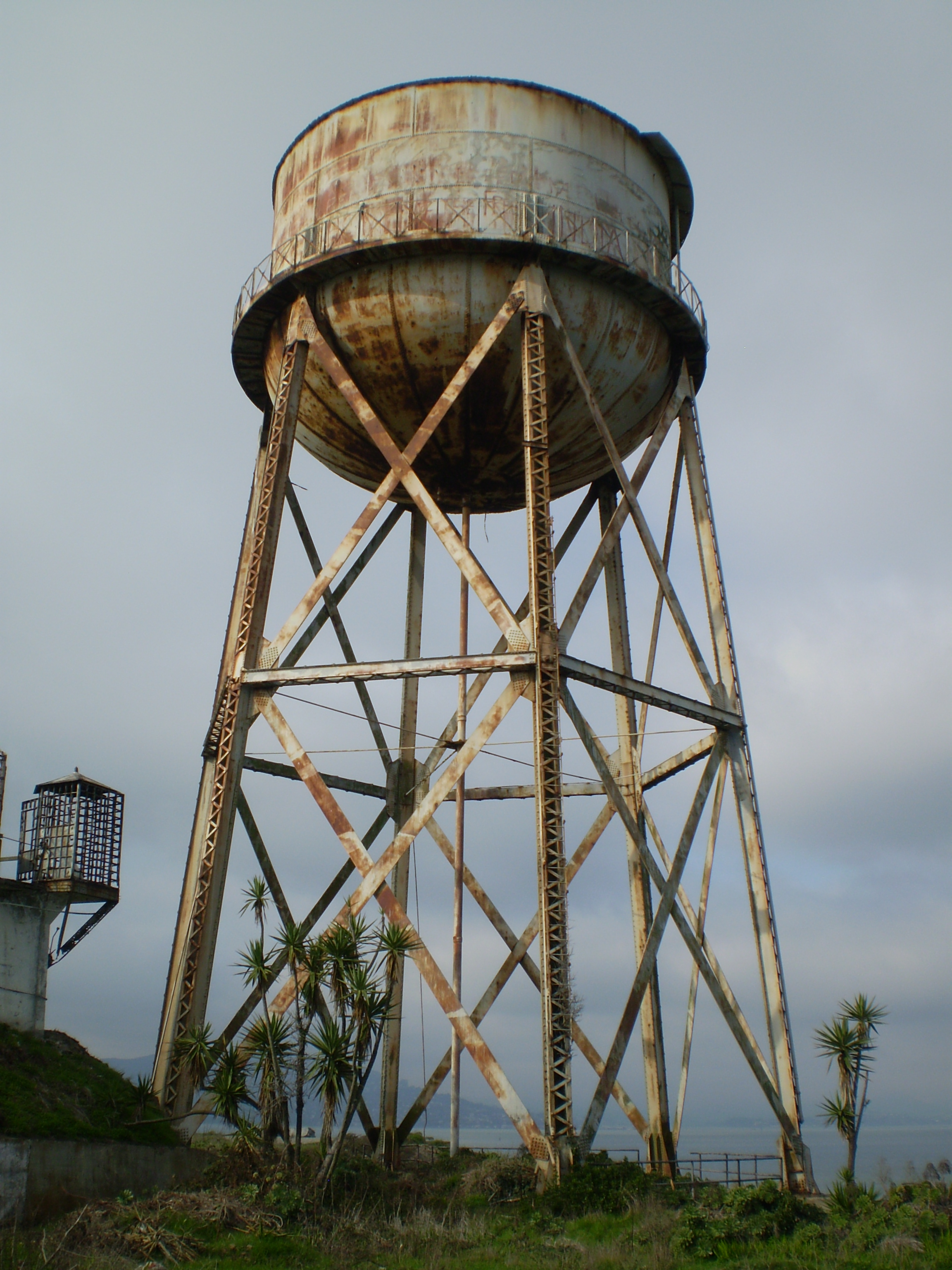
The water tower in 2008, visibly rusting

The water tower is located on the northwestern side of the island, near Tower No. 3, beyond the Morgue and Recreation Yard. The water tank is situated on six cross-braced steel legs submerged in concrete foundations.

As Alcatraz had no water supply of its own, it had to import it from the mainland, brought by tug and barge. During the island's military years, there were in-ground water tanks and water tanks were situated on the roof of the citadel. The water tower was built in 1940–41 by the Federal Bureau of Prisons, after the island received a government renovations grant to supply the majority of the island's fresh water.

It is the tallest building on the island, at a height of 94 feet (29 m) with a volume of 250,000 US gallons (950 kL) gallons of fresh water. It was used to store potable water for drinking, water for firefighting, and water for the island's service laundry facility.

=== Model Industries Building ===
The Model Industries Building is a three/four-story building on the northwest corner of Alcatraz Island. This building was originally built by the U.S. military and was used as a laundry building until the New Industries Building was built as part of a redevelopment program on Alcatraz in 1939 when it was a federal penitentiary. As part of the Alcatraz jail, it held workshops for inmates to work in.

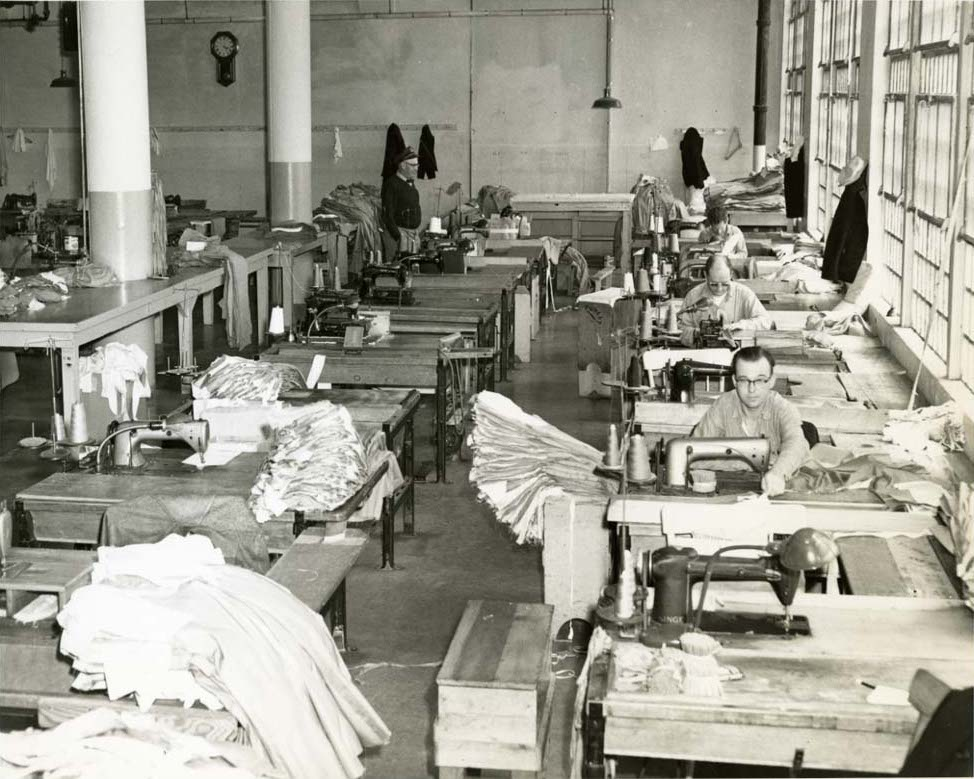
Inmates working in the sewing room

On January 10, 1935, the building shifted to within 2.5 feet from the edge of the cliff following a landslide caused by a severe storm. The warden at the time, James A. Johnston, proposed to extend the seawall next to it and asked the bureau for $6500 to fund it. He would later claim to dislike the building because it was irregularly shaped. A smaller, cheaper riprap was completed by the end of 1935.

A guard tower and a catwalk from Hill Tower was added to the roof of the Industries Building in June 1936 and the building was made secure with bars from old cells to bar the windows and roof ventilators to prevent inmates from escaping from the roof. It ceased use as a laundry in 1939 when it was moved to the upper floor of the New Industries Building. Today the building is heavily rusted after decades of exposure to the salt air and wind, and neither the guard tower on top of the building nor the Hill Tower still exist.

=== New Industries Building ===
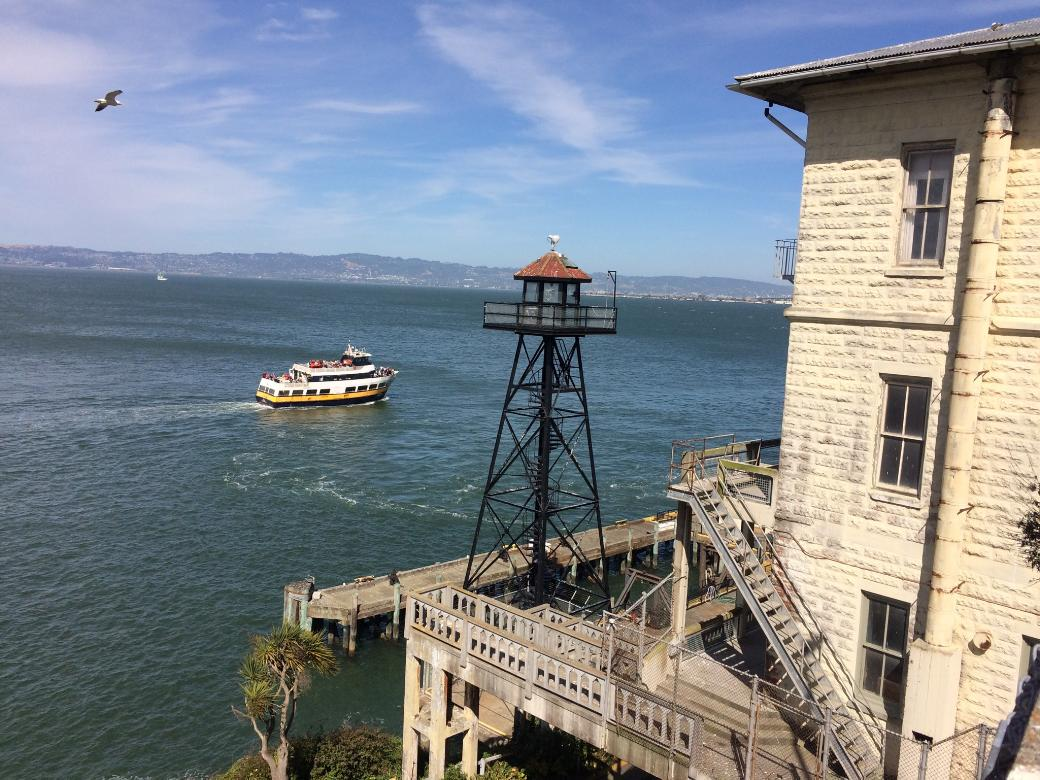
A boat bypassing the watchtower at Alcatraz Island (June 2016)

The New Industries Building was constructed in 1939 for $186,000 as part of a $1.1 million modernization scheme which also included the water tower, power house, officers' quarters and remodeling of the D-block.

The ground floor of the two-story 306 ft long building contained a clothing factory, dry cleaning plant, furniture plant, brush factory, and an office, where prisoners of the federal penitentiary could work for money. They earned a small wage for their labour which was put into an account, known as a Prisoner's Trust Fund, which would be given to them upon leaving Alcatraz. They made items such as gloves, furniture mats, and army uniforms. The laundry room occupied the entire upper floor, the largest in San Francisco at the time. Each window has 9 panes and there are 17 bays on each floor on either side.

== Notable inmates ==
Image	Inmate	Number/Term	Summary
	Arthur R. Barker ("Doc")	#268 1935–39	Arthur Barker (June 4, 1899 – January 13, 1939) was the son of Ma Barker and a member of the Barker-Karpis gang along with Alcatraz prisoner 325 Alvin Karpis. In 1935, Barker was sent to Alcatraz Island on conspiracy to kidnap charges. On the night of January 13, 1939, Barker with Henri Young and Rufus McCain attempted escape from Alcatraz. Barker was shot and killed by the guards.
	Alphonse "Al" Gabriel Capone ("Scarface")	#85 1934–39	When Al Capone (January 17, 1899 – January 25, 1947) arrived on Alcatraz in 1934, prison officials made it clear that he would not be receiving any preferential treatment. While serving his time in Atlanta Federal Penitentiary, Capone, a master manipulator, had continued running his rackets from behind bars by buying off guards. Capone generated major media attention while on Alcatraz, though he served just four and a half years of his sentence there before developing symptoms of tertiary syphilis and poor mental health before being transferred to the Federal Correctional Institution at Terminal Island in Los Angeles in 1938. He tried his best to seek favors from warden Johnston, but failed, and was given work in the prison performing numerous menial jobs. Capone was involved in many fights with fellow prisoners, including one with an inmate who held a blade to his throat in the prison barbershop after Capone attempted to cut the line. He was released from jail in November 1939 and lived in Miami until his death in 1947 at 48 years of age.
	Meyer Harris Cohen ("Mickey")	#1518 1961–63	Mickey Cohen (September 4, 1913 – July 29, 1976) worked for the Mafia's gambling rackets; he was convicted of tax evasion and sentenced to 15 years in Alcatraz Island. He was transferred to the United States Penitentiary in Atlanta shortly before Alcatraz closed permanently on March 21, 1963. While at Atlanta, on August 14, 1963, fellow inmate Burl Estes McDonald clobbered Cohen with a lead pipe, partially paralyzing the mobster. After his release in 1972, Cohen led a quiet life with old friends.
	Ellsworth Raymond Johnson ("Bumpy")	#1117 1954–63	"Bumpy" Johnson (October 31, 1905 – July 7, 1968), referred to as the "Godfather of Harlem", was an African-American gangster, numbers operator, racketeer, and bootlegger in Harlem in the early 20th century. He was sent to Alcatraz in 1954 and was imprisoned until 1963. He was believed to have been involved in the 1962 escape attempt of Frank Morris, John and Clarence Anglin.
	Alvin Francis Karpavicz ("Creepy Karpis")	#325 1936–62	Alvin Karpis (August 10, 1907 – August 26, 1979) was Canadian, of Lithuanian descent. He was nicknamed "Creepy" for his sinister smile and called "Ray" by his gang members. He was known for being one of the three leaders of the Ma Barker-Karpis gang in the 1930s; the other two leaders were Fred and Doc Barker of the Barker–Karpis Gang. He was the only "Public Enemy #1" to be taken personally by J. Edgar Hoover. There were only four "public enemies" ever given the title of "Public Enemy #1" by the FBI. The other three, John Dillinger, Pretty Boy Floyd, and Baby Face Nelson, were all killed before being captured. He also spent the longest time as a federal prisoner in Alcatraz Prison at 26 years. Karpis was credited with ten murders and six kidnappings apart from bank robbery. He was deported to Canada in 1969 and died in Spain in 1979.
	George Kelly Barnes ("Machine Gun Kelly")	#117 1934–51	"Machine Gun Kelly" (July 18, 1895 – July 18, 1954) arrived on September 4, 1934. At Alcatraz, Kelly was constantly boasting about several robberies and murders that he had never committed. Although his boasts were said to be tiresome to other prisoners, Warden Johnston considered him a model inmate. Inmate #139, Harvey Bailey was his partner. Kelly was returned to Leavenworth in 1951.
	Rafael Cancel Miranda	#1163 1954–60	In July 1954, Rafael Cancel Miranda (July 18, 1930 – March 2, 2020) was sent to Alcatraz, where he served six years of his sentence. At Alcatraz he was a model prisoner, where he worked in the brush factory and served as an altar boy at Catholic services. His closest friends were fellow Puerto Ricans Emerito Vasquez and Hiram Crespo-Crespo. They spoke Spanish and watched out for each other. On the recreation yard he often played chess with "Bumpy" Johnson. He also befriended Morton Sobell; they developed a friendship that lasted up until Sobell's death in 2018. His family made trips to San Francisco to visit him, but he wasn't allowed to see his children. His wife was allowed to talk to him through a glass in the visiting room, using a phone. They were not allowed to speak in Spanish and had to speak in English. He was transferred to Leavenworth in 1960.
	Robert Franklin Stroud ("Birdman of Alcatraz")	#594 1942–59	Robert Stroud, who was better known to the public as the Birdman of Alcatraz (January 28, 1890 – November 21, 1963), was transferred to Alcatraz in 1942. At a young age he took to pimping and was involved in a murder during a drunken brawl. After terms in McNeil Island and Leavenworth Federal Prison, where he had killed Officer Andrew Turner, he was transferred to Alcatraz, with his sentence extended. A self-taught ornithologist, he wrote several books. His Digest on the Diseases of Birds is considered a classic in ornithology. He was confined to D-Block in solitary confinement for most of his duration in Alcatraz. and after a term in the prison hospital, was transferred to the Medical Center for Federal Prisoners in Springfield, Missouri, due to seriously deteriorating health. Although he was given the name "The Birdman of Alcatraz", he was not permitted to keep birds in his prison cell at Alcatraz, as he had at Leavenworth, because it was prohibited. He died in 1963.

== Legends ==
Indigenous Americans, known as Ohlone, were the earliest known inhabitants of Alcatraz island. In Miwok mythology, evil spirits were said to inhabit the island. In popular culture, Alcatraz has been listed as among the top five allegedly "haunted" spots in California.

== See also ==
- Alligator Alcatraz
- ADX Florence – nicknamed "Alcatraz of the Rockies"
- Louisiana State Penitentiary – nicknamed "Alcatraz of the South"
- Tilanqiao Prison, formerly Shanghai Municipal Gaol – nicknamed "Alcatraz of the Orient"
