= Alcatraz Library =

Library for inmates at Alcatraz Federal Penitentiary

Coordinates: 37°49′35″N 122°25′22″W

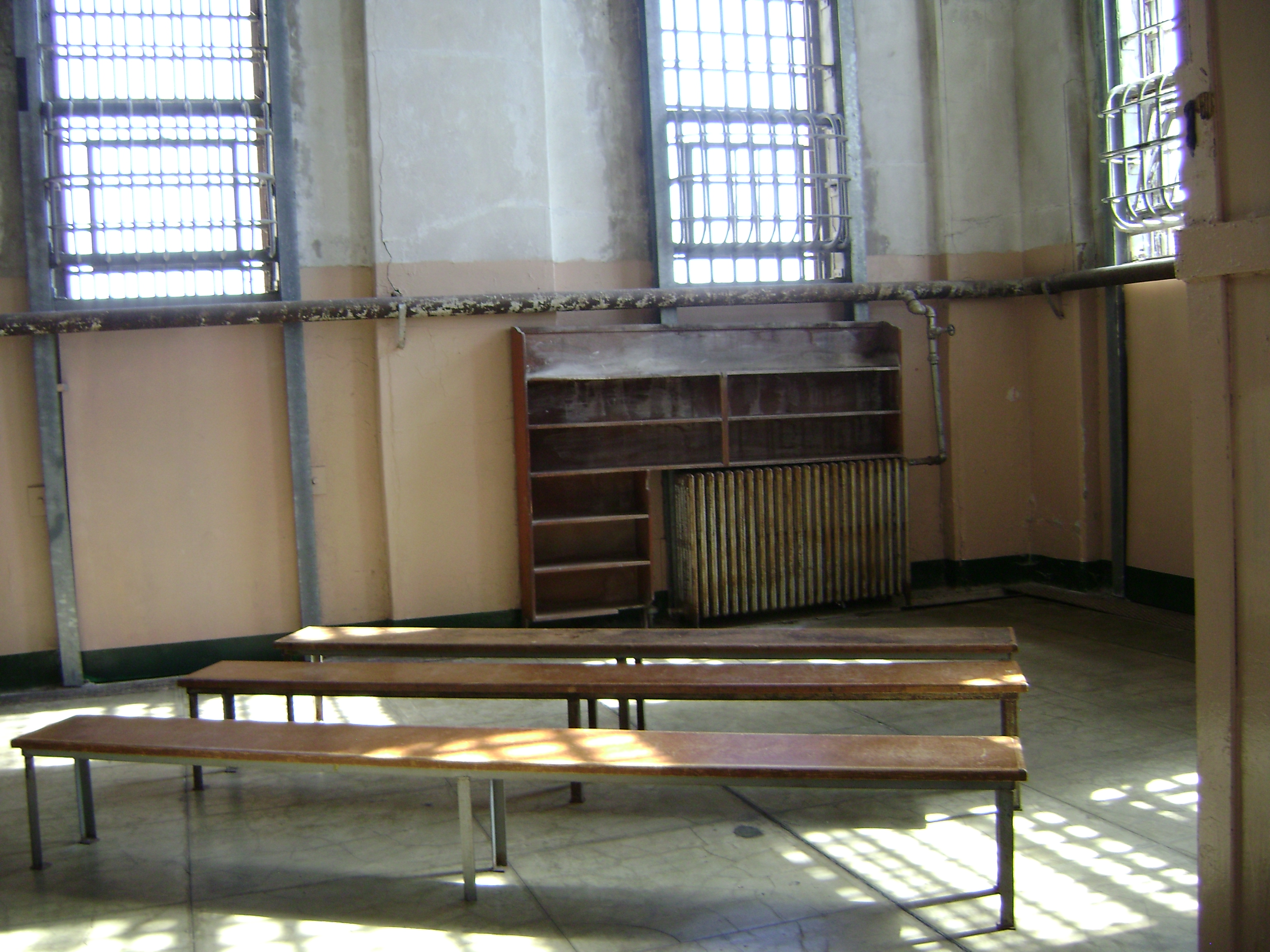
Alcatraz Library

Alcatraz Library was a library for inmates at Alcatraz Federal Penitentiary. It was located at the end of D-Block. On entering Alcatraz, every inmate received a library card and a catalog of books found in the library. An inmate would order a book by putting a slip with their card in a box at the entrance to the dining hall before breakfast, and a librarian took the order to and from their cell. The library, which used a closed-stack paging system, had a collection of 10,000 to 15,000 books, mainly left over from Alcatraz's army days.

Inmates were permitted a maximum of three books in addition to up to 12 text books, a Bible, and a dictionary. They were permitted to subscribe to magazines but crime-related pages were torn out and newspapers were prohibited. Crime and violence were prohibited from all books and magazines, and the library was governed by a chaplain who regulated the censorship and the nature of the reading material to ensure that the material was wholesome. Failure to return books by the date given made the inmate liable to removal of privileges.

A sign in the library today displays an extract from the Federal Bureau of Prisons booklet in 1960: "These men read more serious literature than does the ordinary person in the community. Philosophers such as Kant, Schopenhauer, Hegel, etc. are especially popular." Other authors include Jack London, Sinclair Lewis, Washington Irving, Zane Grey, Hamlin Garland, Alexandre Dumas, Daniel Defoe, Joseph Conrad, Miguel de Cervantes and magazines such as Adventure to Time, Better Homes and Gardens and Library Digest. A law library was later added to A-Block.
