= Verrill Rapp =

American Criminal (1906-1995)

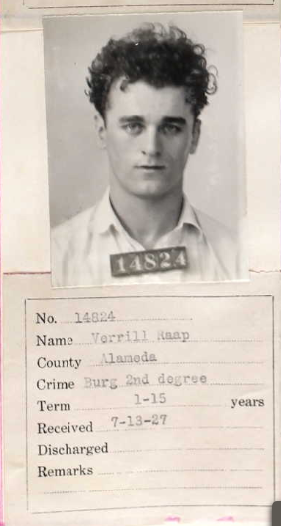
Verrill Raap Mugshot

Verrill Rapp, also Verrill Hersey Raap (c. 1906-January 22, 1995) was an American criminal who was a convicted post office robber. A 1930 census mentioned him living in Fresno, California and being 24 years old at the time. On August 11, 1934, he was transferred from McNeil Island to Alcatraz Federal Penitentiary to become one of the first civilian inmates incarcerated there – sentenced to four years for assault on a police officer and breaking jail. He is best known for being the earliest prisoner to be paroled from Alcatraz in the spring of 1935. Upon leaving to stand trial on other charges, Rapp reported that Alcatraz was a place of "inhumane treatment" and that it was causing many inmates to go insane. This was widely reported in the press and marked the beginning of its sinister reputation.

After being paroled, Rapp worked a series of jobs, eventually being employed as a tugboat captain in San Francisco Bay for 25 years. He died on January 22, 1995 in Hayward, CA.
