= Alcatraz Hospital =

- Federal Bureau of Prisons
- The hospital ward

Geography
- Location: Alcatraz Island, San Francisco Bay, California, United States
- Coordinates: 37°49′37″N 122°25′23″W

Organization
- Type: Prison hospital

History
- Opened: 1870
- Closed: 21 March 1963;

Links
- Lists: Hospitals in California

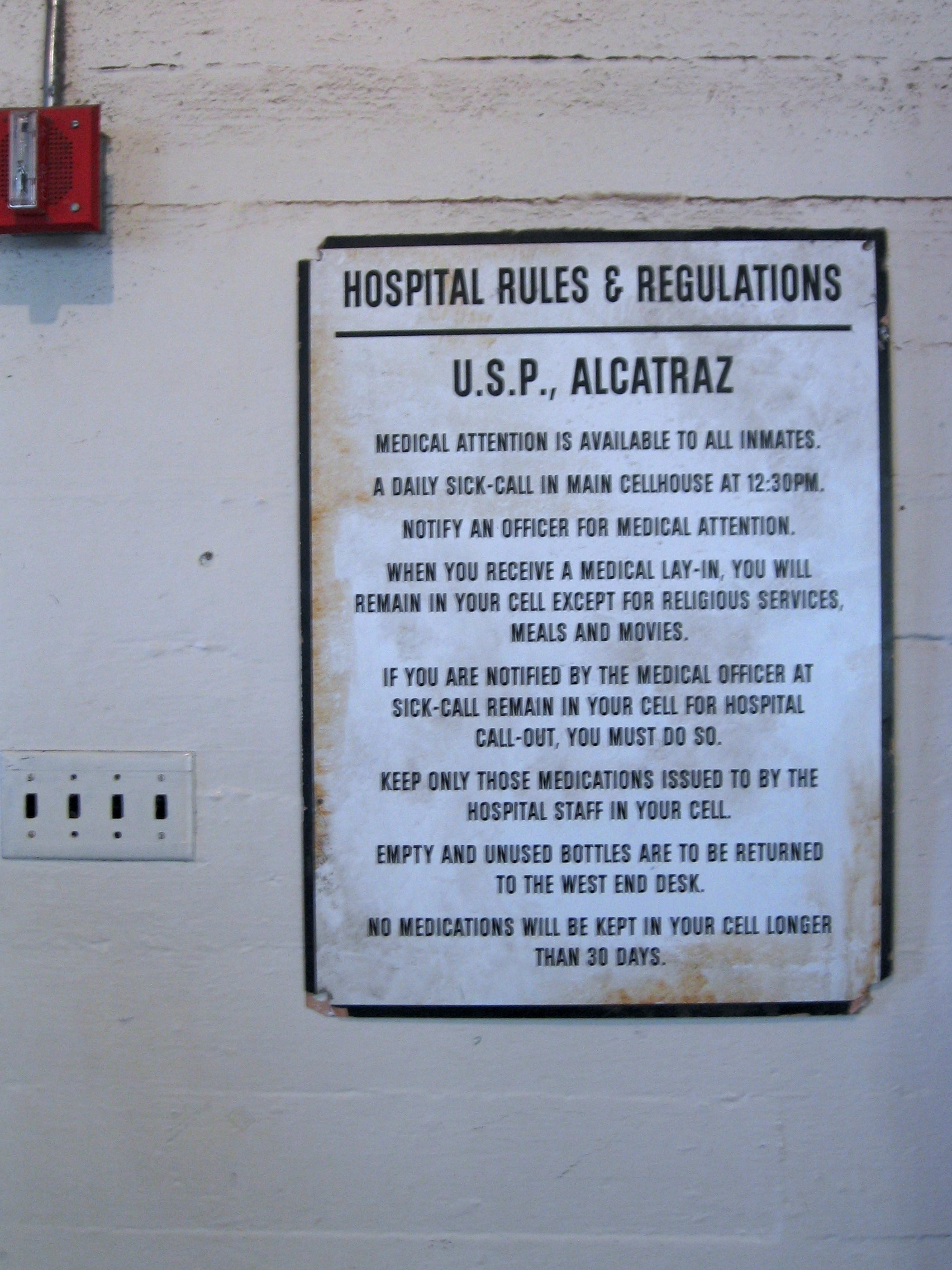
Posted hospital rules.

Alcatraz Hospital is a defunct hospital which was located on Alcatraz Island, California, US. It began operations in the 19th century while the United States Army operated Fort Alcatraz and continued to provide services after the transition to the Alcatraz Federal Penitentiary. Though Alcatraz is now part of the Golden Gate National Recreation Area, the hospital is not included on the general tour.

== History ==
In 1870, the military hospital had ten beds, as well as tables, chairs, washstands, a dumbwaiter, and a closet. Measuring 35 by 26 feet (10.7 m × 7.9 m), it was heated by coal stoves. It was expanded in the late 19th century.

The penitentiary hospital was established on June 14, 1934. It provided medical and dental service to inmates, prison personnel, Lighthouse Service employees, and to civilians on the island. The hospital was situated on the floor above the dining room. It contained three large wards with five hospital beds each, two isolation wards, a treatment room, surgery room, and a supply room, a doctor's office, dentists office, and chief Medical Technical Assistant's (MTA) office, plus a kitchen, and a bathroom with toilet and shower.

During its penitentiary years, the hospital was initially staffed by U.S. Public Health Service personnel who were assigned to the Federal Prison Service. While a physician was in residence on the island through the 1950s, cost-cutting measures included switching to private contracted physicians. Two of the most notable hospital patients were Robert Stroud, the "Birdman of Alcatraz", who spent eleven years confined to the infirmary to separate him from the general population, and Al Capone who spent more time in the hospital than in the general prison population.
