= Baker Beach (Alcatraz) =

Beach on Alcatraz Island, San Francisco, California, United States

Coordinates: 37°49′35″N 122°25′26″W

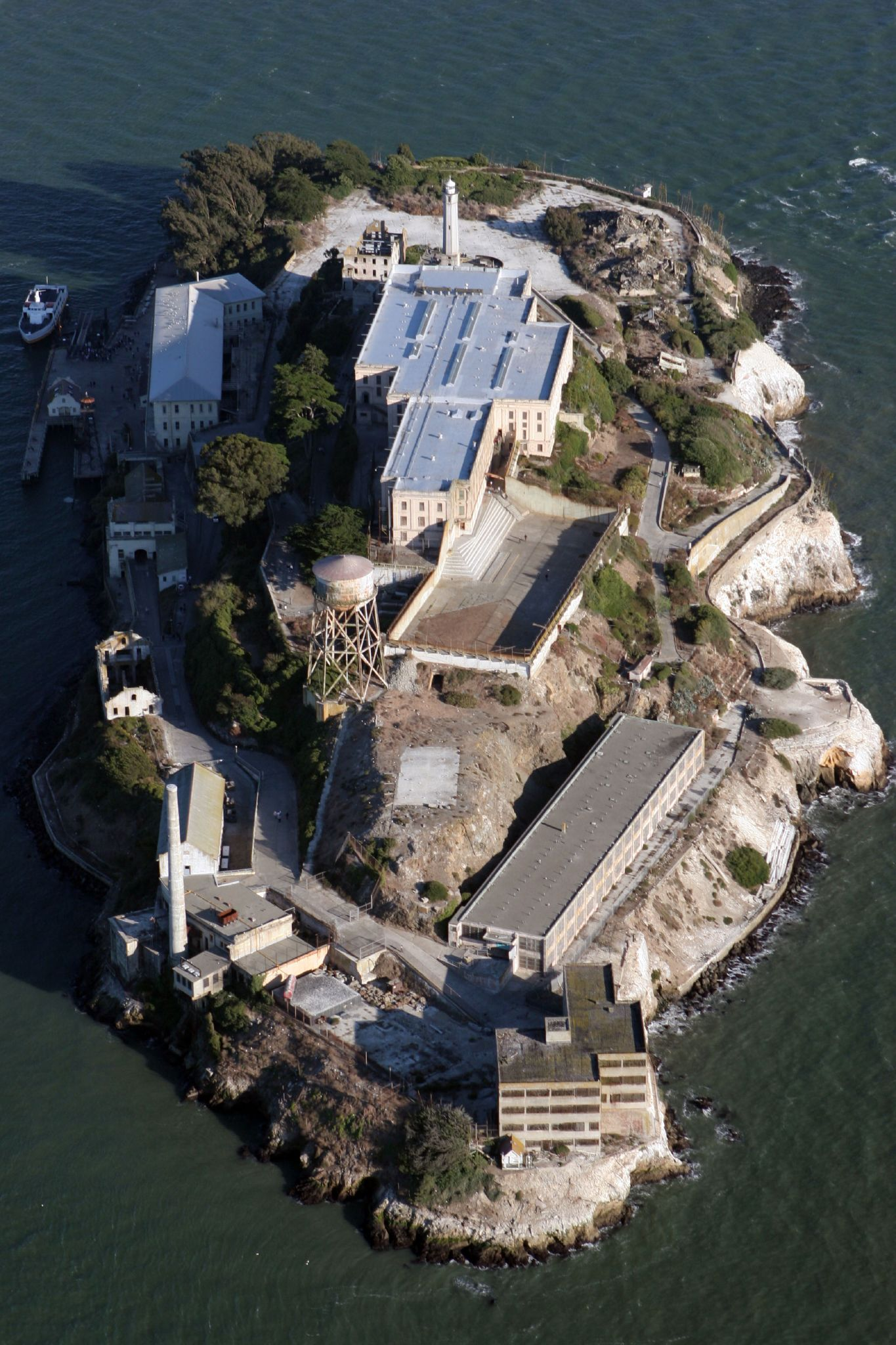
Barker Beach is the inlet beyond the long New Industries Building on the bottom right

Barker Beach is a small beach and rocky coastal area on the west side of Alcatraz Island, off the coast of San Francisco, California. It lies south of the long two-story New Industries Building. During the foggy, early morning hours of Friday, January 13, 1939, five inmates - William "Ty" Martin (AZ-370), Henri Young (AZ-244), Rufus McCain (AZ-267), Dale Stamphill (AZ-435), and Arthur "Doc" Barker (AZ-268) - broke out of their D-Block cells and climbed out of a window that had its bars severed in advance, with the sabotage camouflaged with paint and putty. The five men made it to the water's edge and began to look for driftwood to build a raft. In the meantime, their absence was discovered and guards swarmed the island with rifles and machine guns. Dark figures were spotted on the western shore and guards opened fire. Stamphill was shot in the legs multiple times but recovered. Doc Barker was hit in the head and died several hours later. The remaining three inmates gave up immediately and were recaptured without injury. The beach was later named after Doc Barker by the National Park Service.

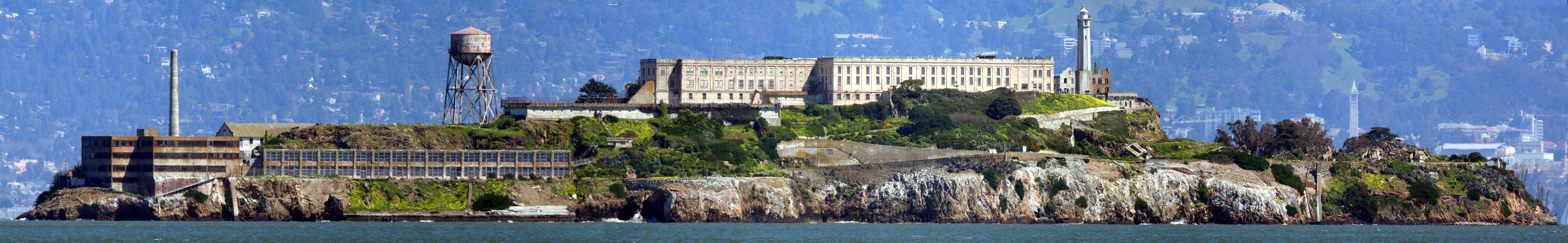
The beach is to the right of the long two-storey building.
