= Critics' Choice Movie Award for Best Actor =

Award given by the Critics Choice Association

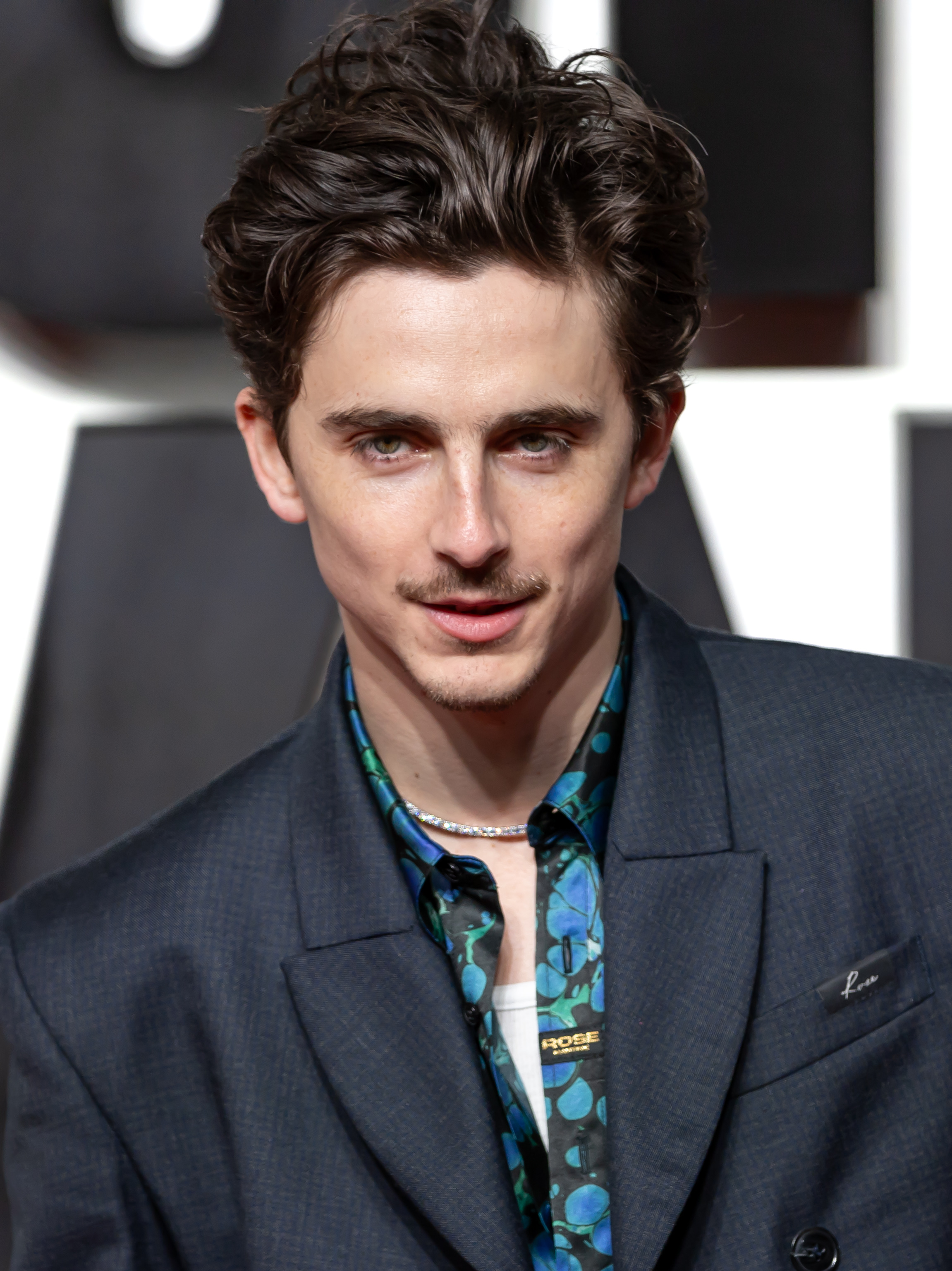
- The 2025 recipient: Timothée Chalamet
- Awarded for: Best Performance by an Actor in a Leading Role in a Movie
- Location: Los Angeles, California
- Presented by: Critics Choice Association
- Currently held by: Timothée Chalamet for Marty Supreme (2025)
- Website: www.criticschoice.com

The Critics' Choice Movie Award for Best Actor is an award given out at the annual Critics' Choice Movie Awards. The awards are presented by the Critics Choice Association (CCA) and was first presented in 1995. There were no official nominees announced until 2001. Actors Russell Crowe and Daniel Day-Lewis hold the record for most wins in this category with three victories each, followed by Jack Nicholson and Sean Penn with two wins each.

This is the main Critics' Choice Movie Award category for leading performances by a male actor. Previously, two other genre-specific categories were presented: Best Actor in a Comedy (2012–2019) and Best Actor in an Action Movie (2012–2016). Currently, another subsidiary, the Critics' Choice Super Awards, presents awards to actors for genre-specific roles (horror, science fiction/fantasy, action, and superhero). For Critics' Choice Awards for lead performances by male actors in television, see Critics' Choice Television Award for Best Actor in a Comedy, Drama or Limited Series or Movie Made for Television.

== Winners and nominees ==
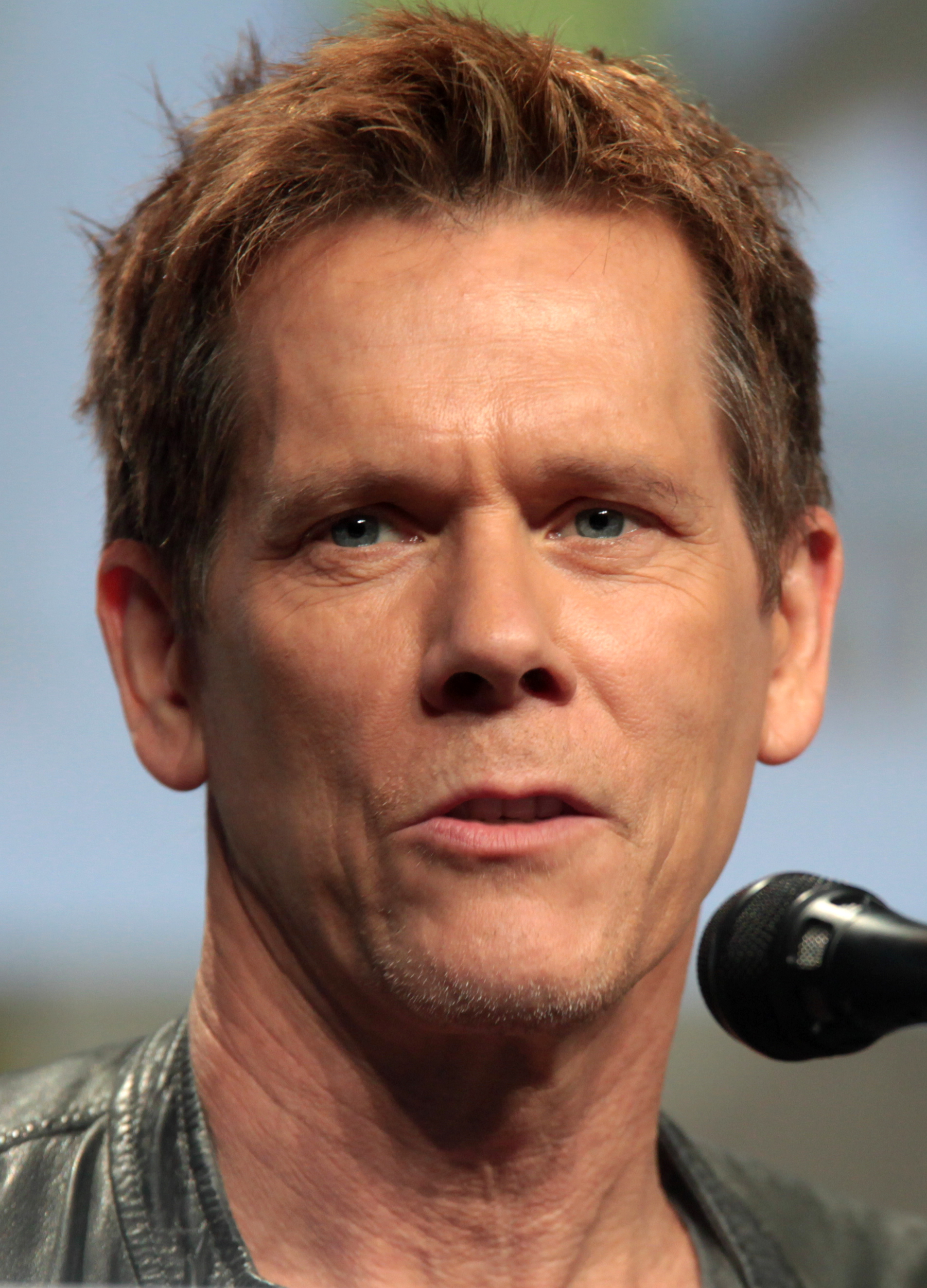
Kevin Bacon was the first recipient of this award, winning for Murder in the First (1995)

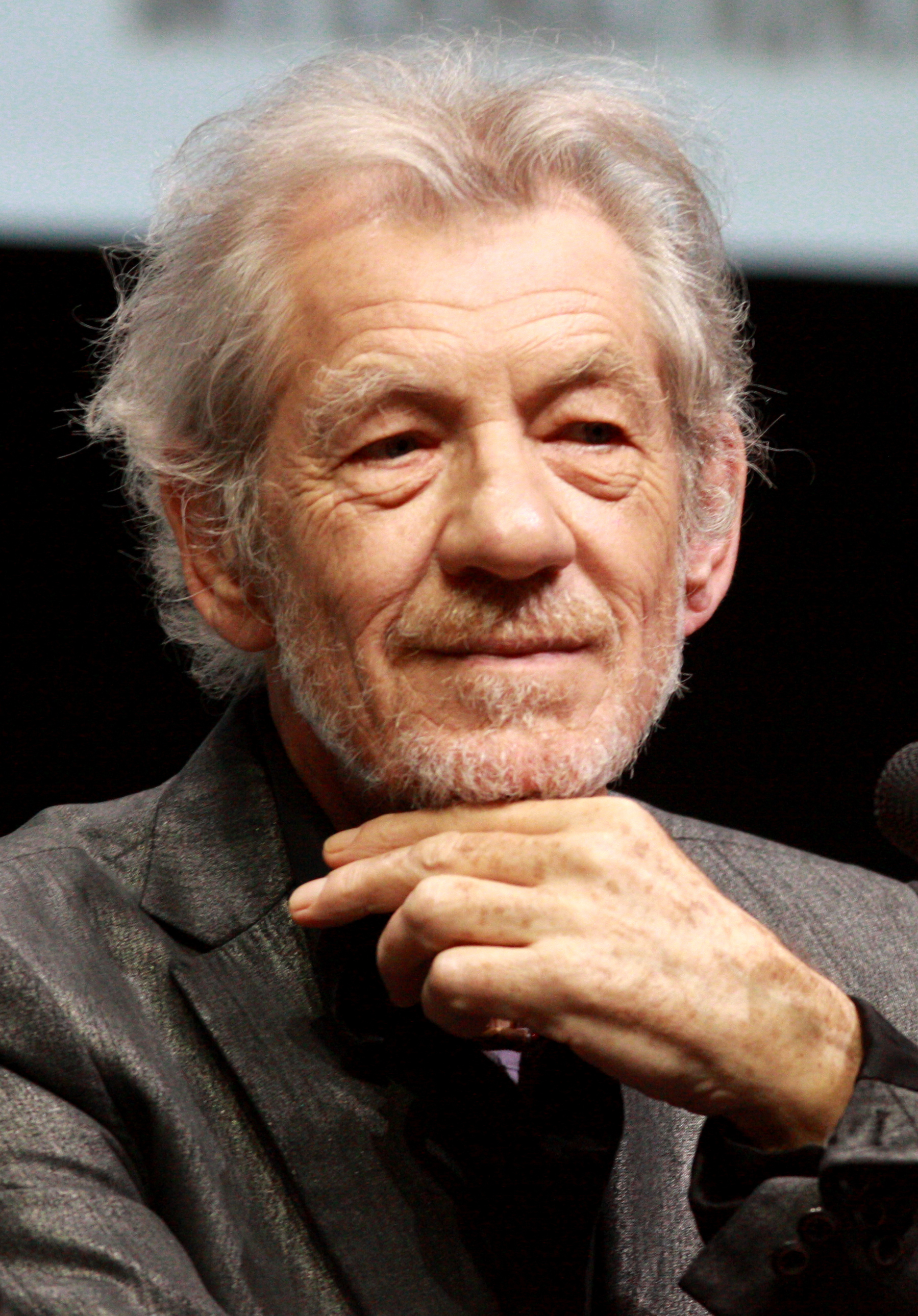
Ian McKellen won for Gods and Monsters (1998)

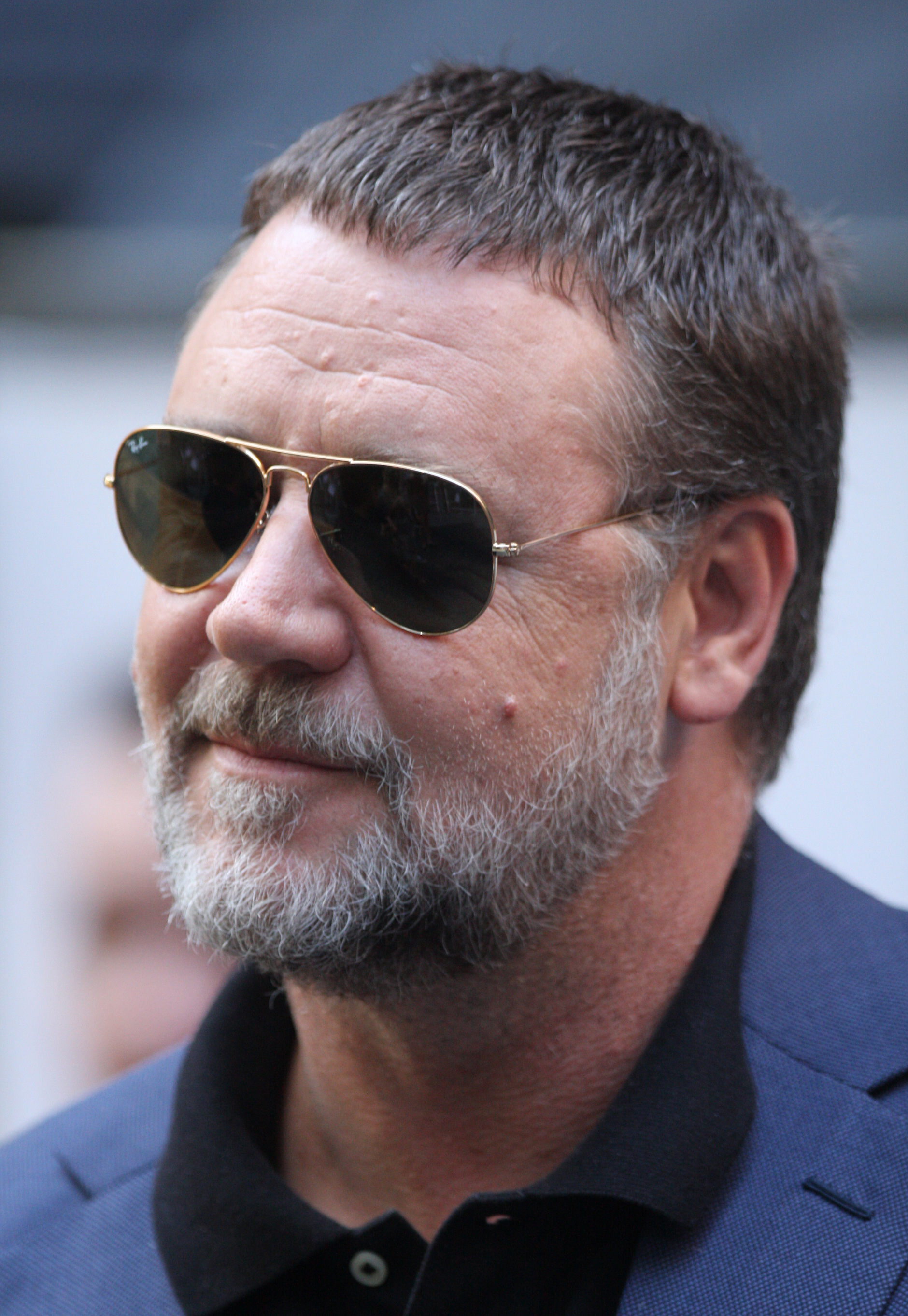
Russell Crowe won thrice consecutively for The Insider (1999), Gladiator (2000), and A Beautiful Mind (2001)

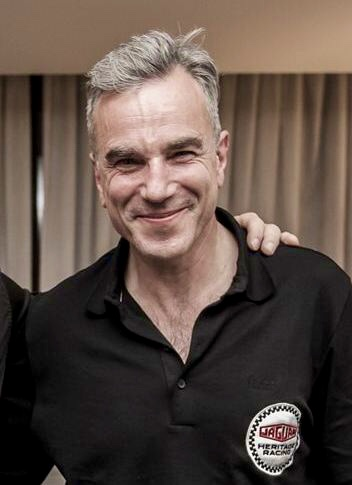
Daniel Day-Lewis won thrice for Gangs of New York (2002), There Will Be Blood (2007), and Lincoln (2012)

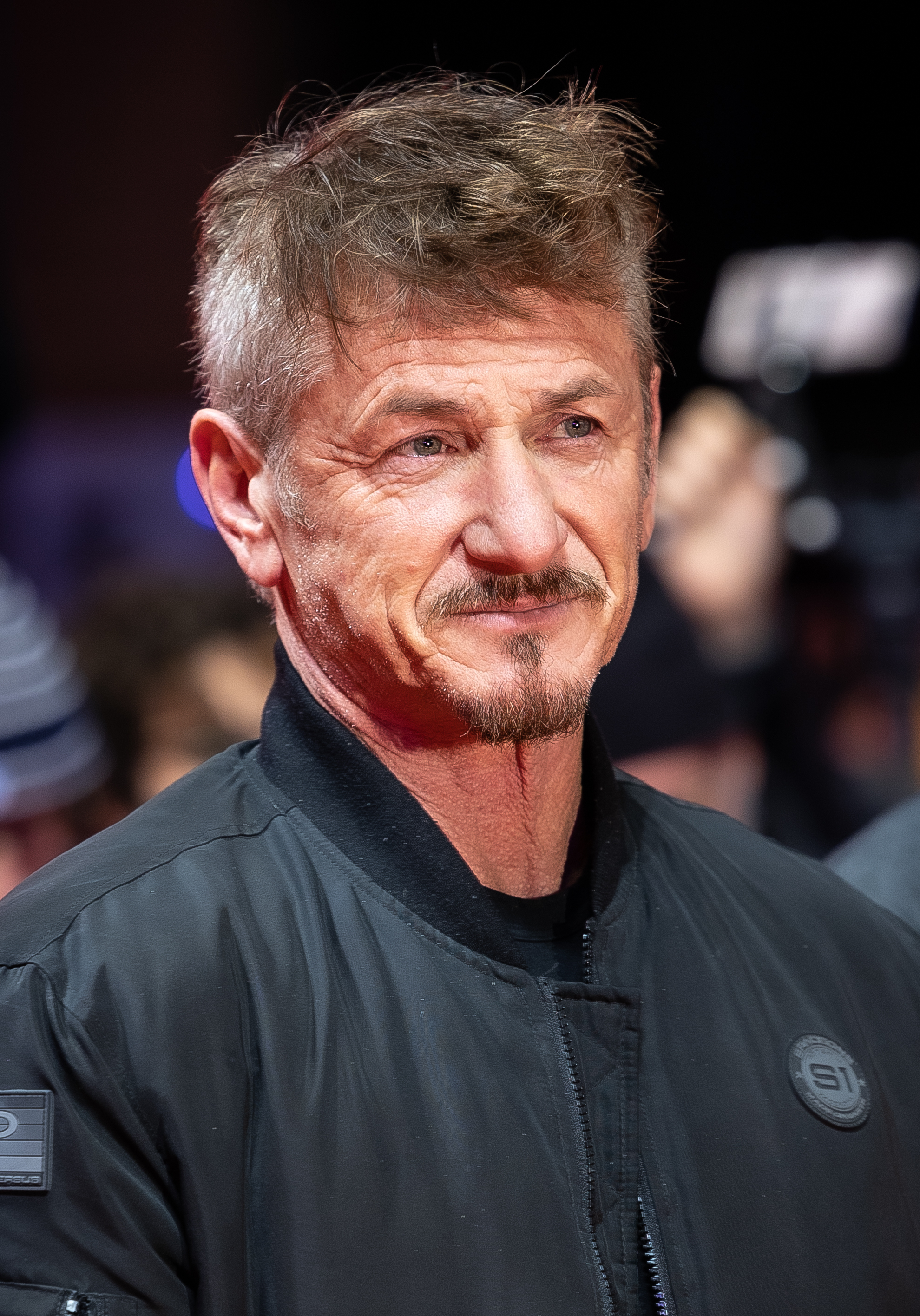
Sean Penn won twice for Mystic River (2003) and Milk (2008)

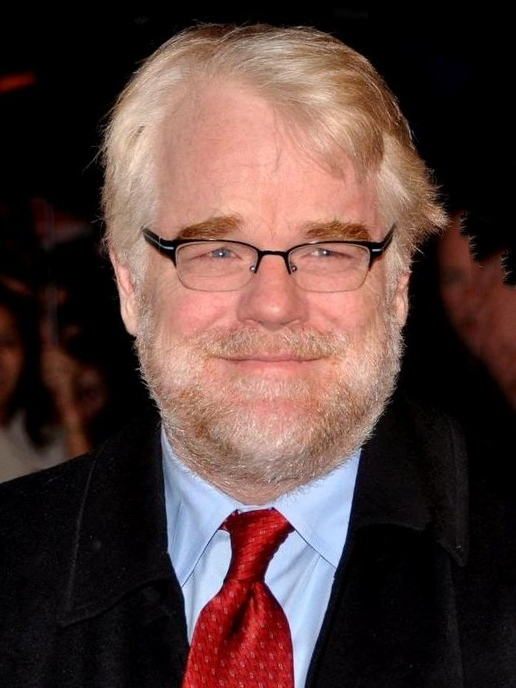
Philip Seymour Hoffman won for Capote (2005)

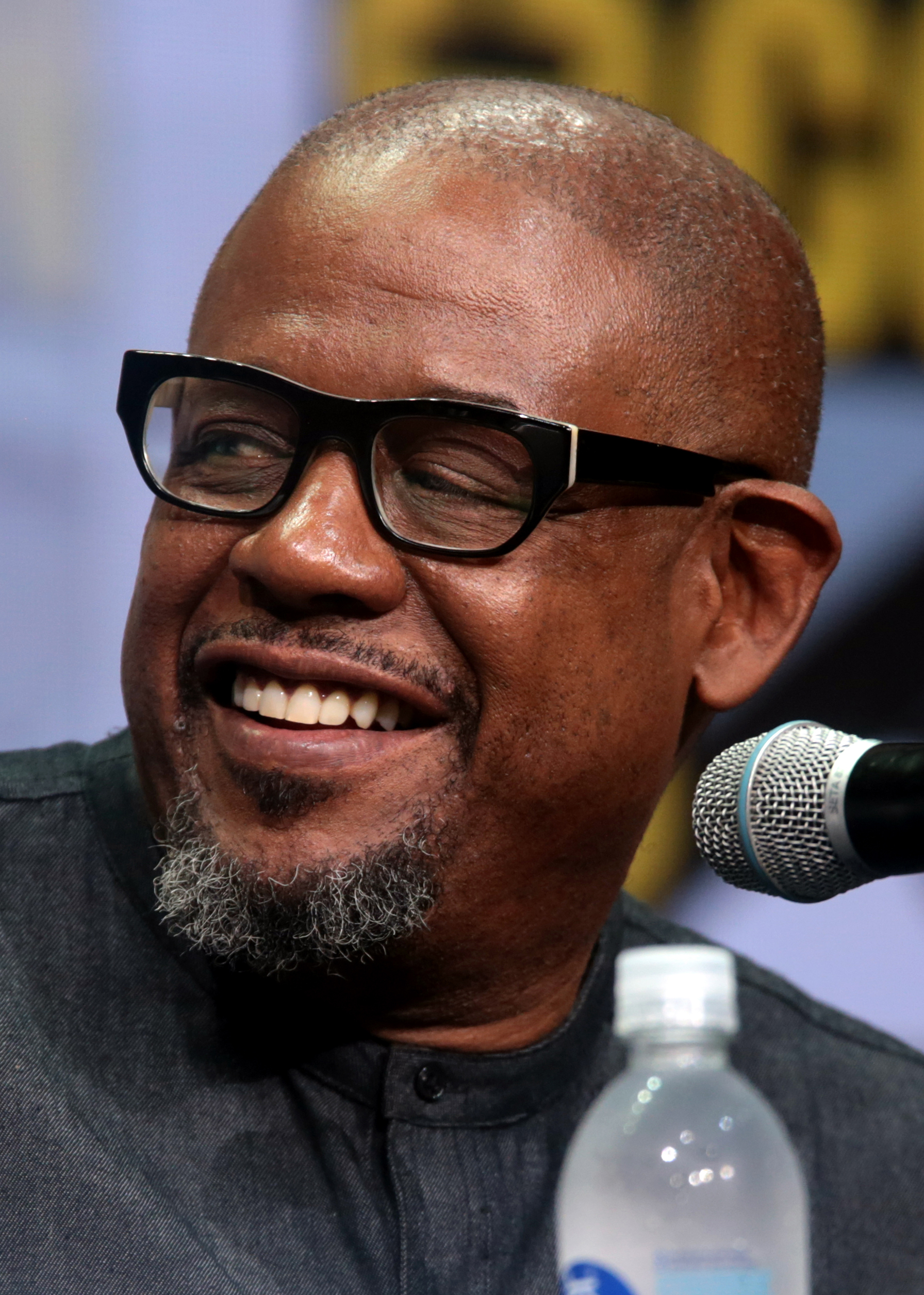
Forest Whitaker won for The Last King of Scotland (2006)

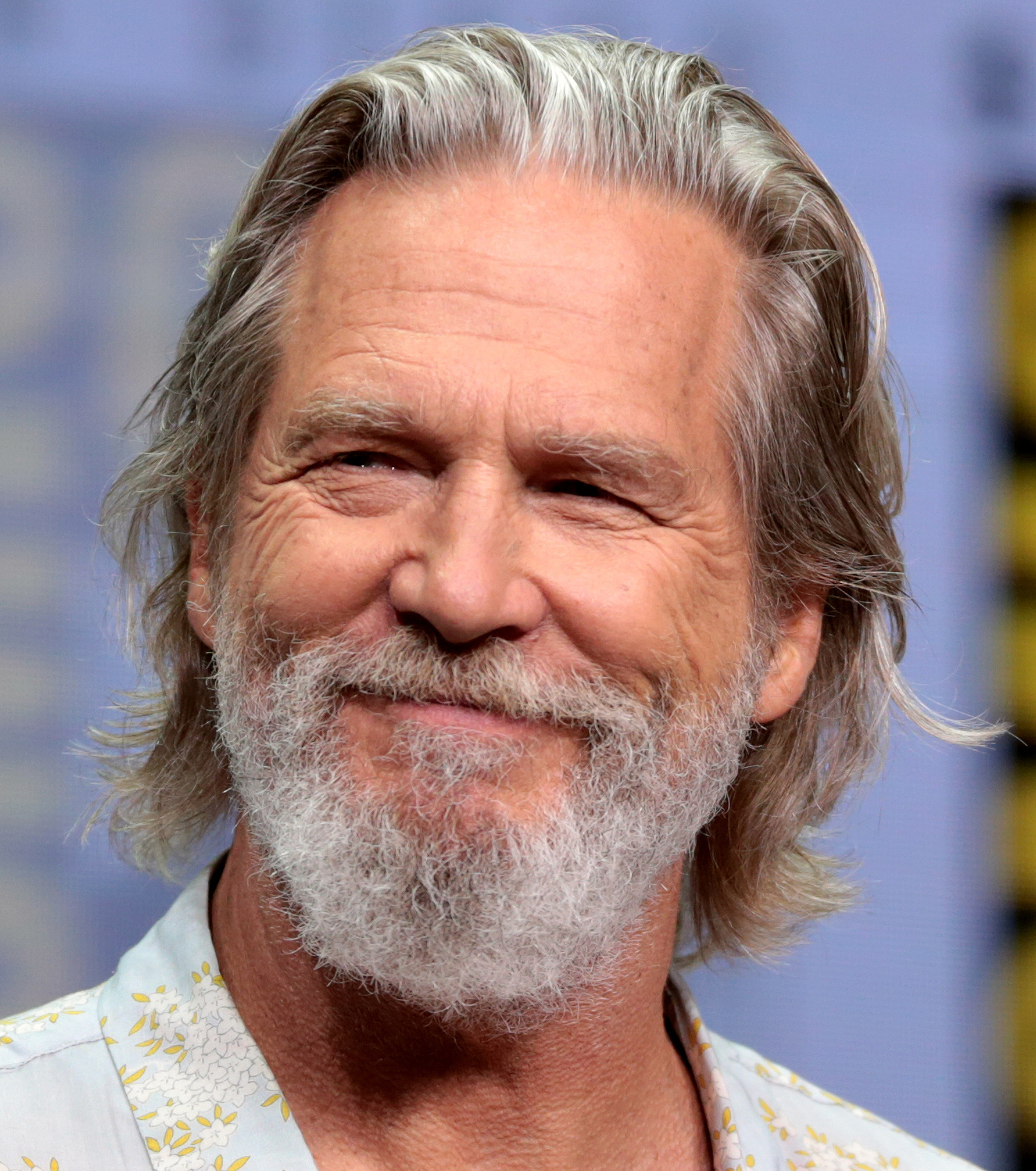
Jeff Bridges won for Crazy Heart (2009)

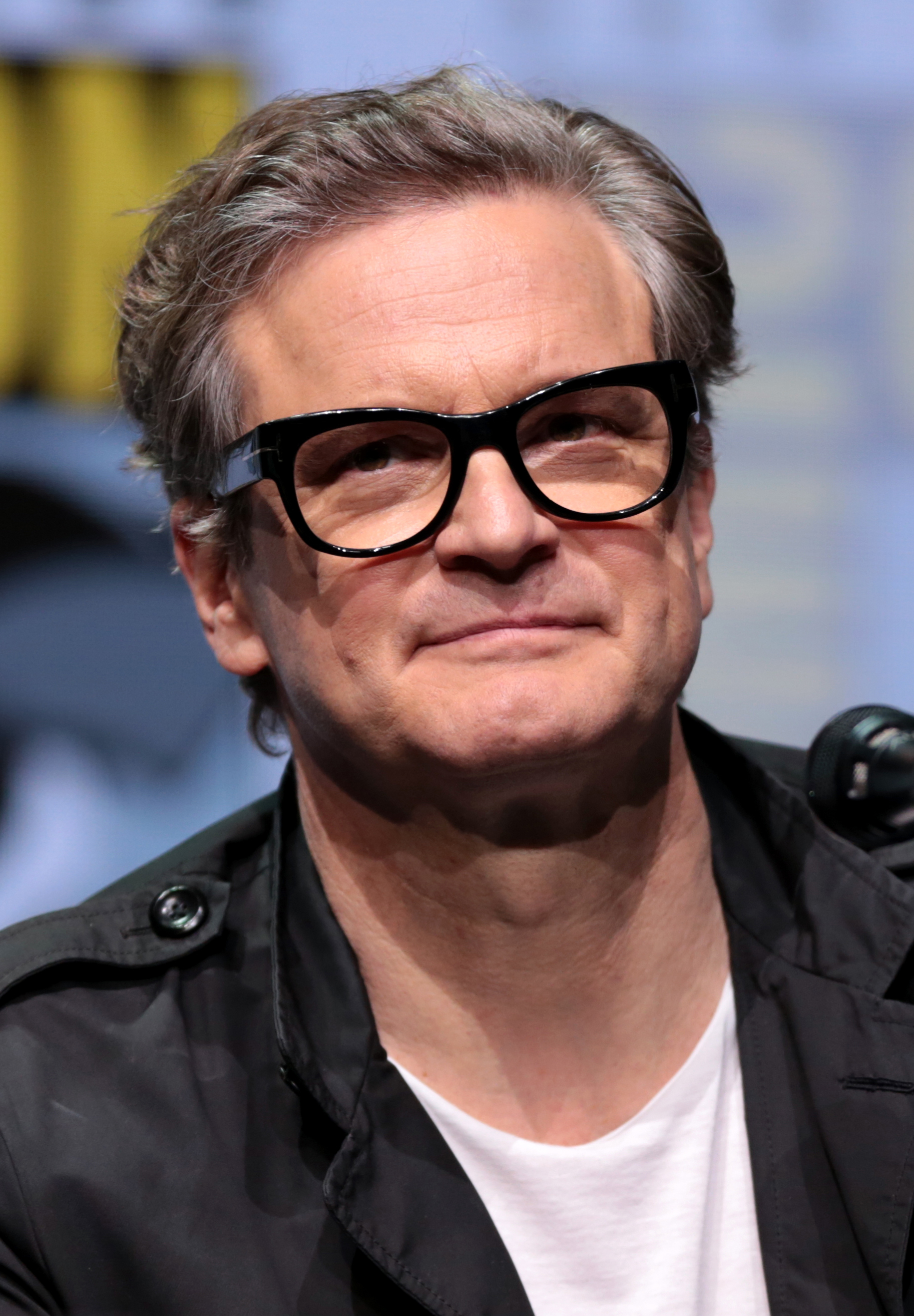
Colin Firth won for The King's Speech (2010)

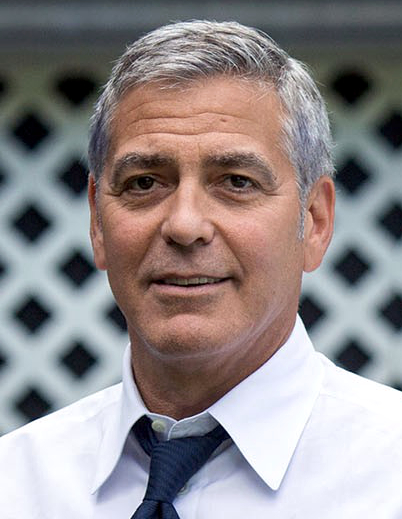
George Clooney won for The Descendants (2011)

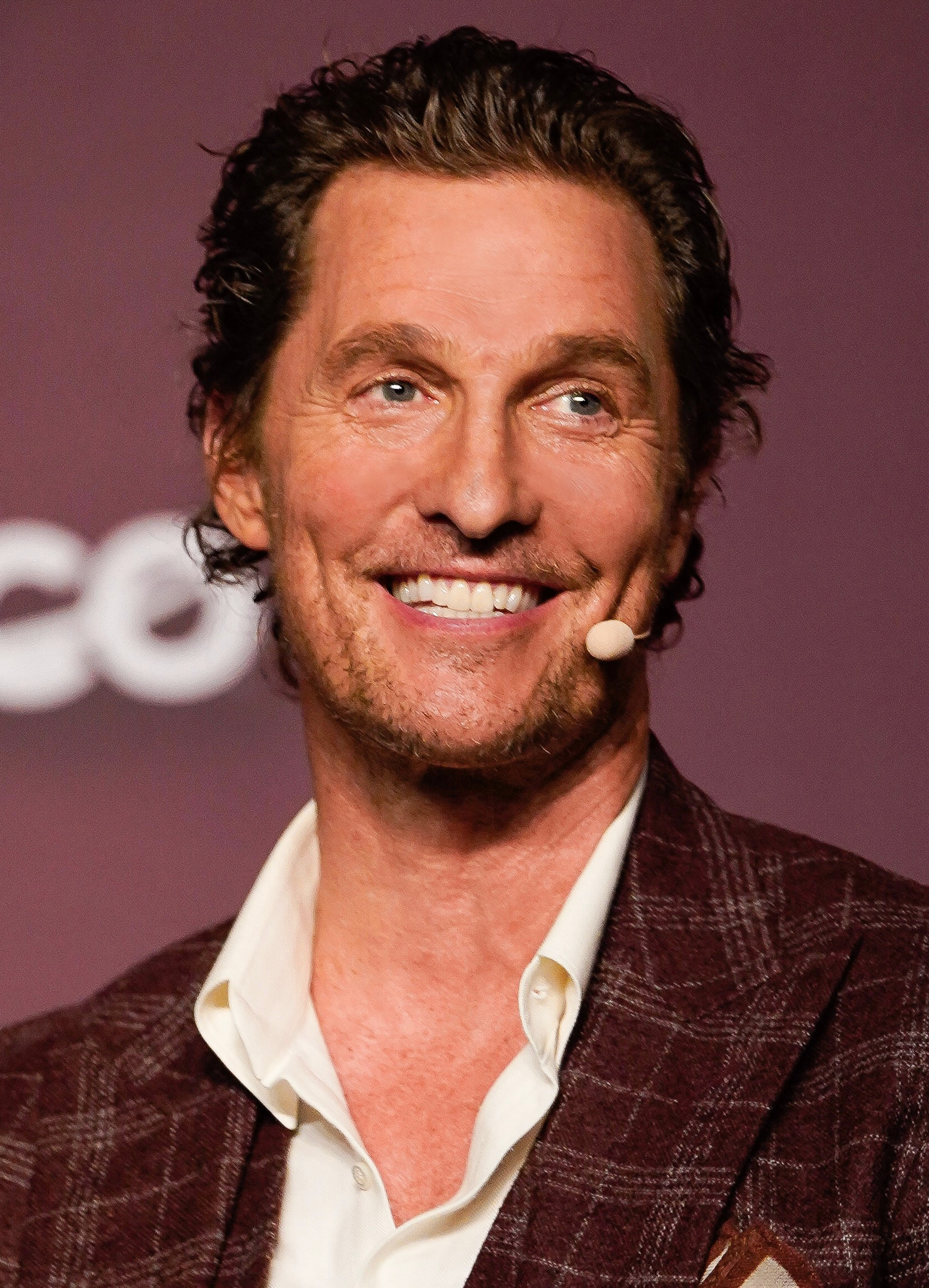
Matthew McConaughey won for Dallas Buyers Club (2013)

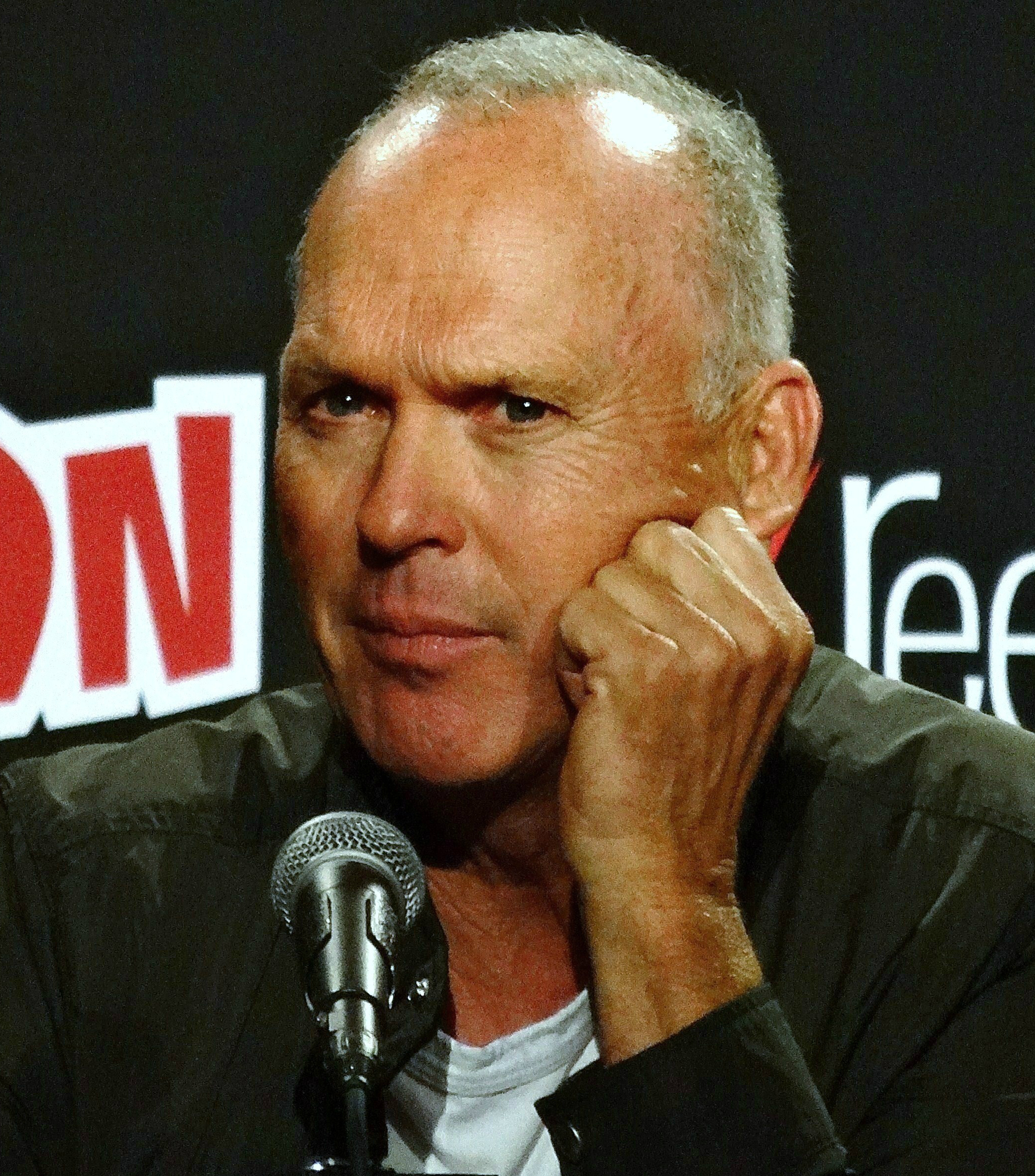
Michael Keaton won for Birdman (2014)

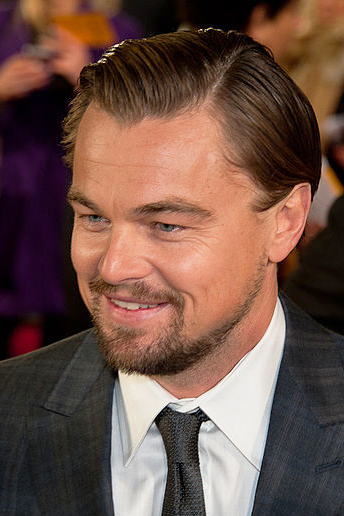
Leonardo DiCaprio won for The Revenant (2015)

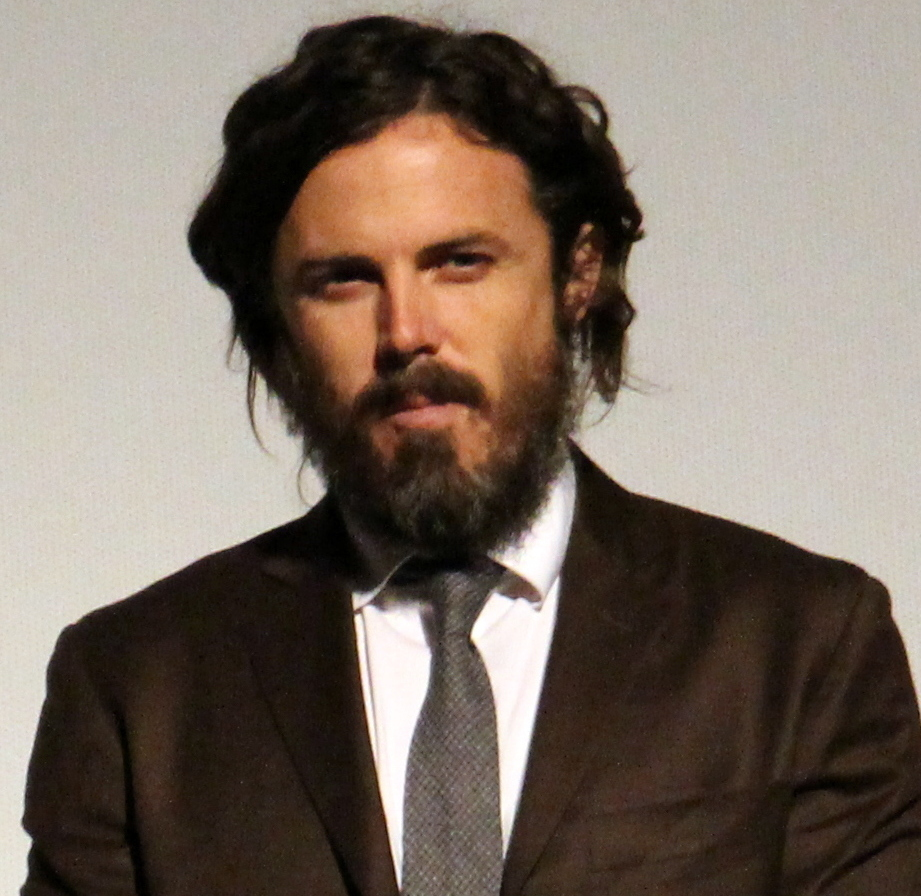
Casey Affleck won for Manchester by the Sea (2016)

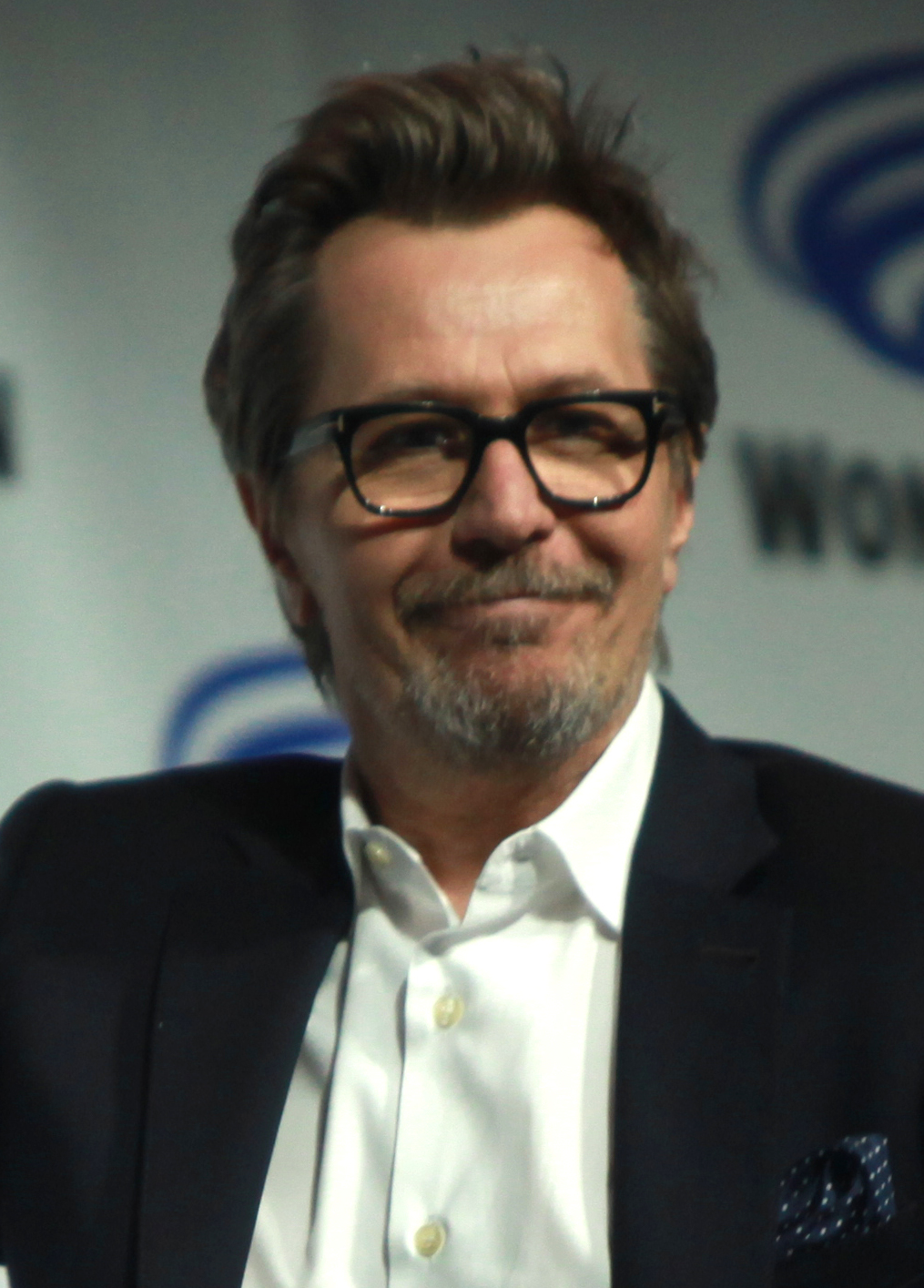
Gary Oldman won for Darkest Hour (2017)

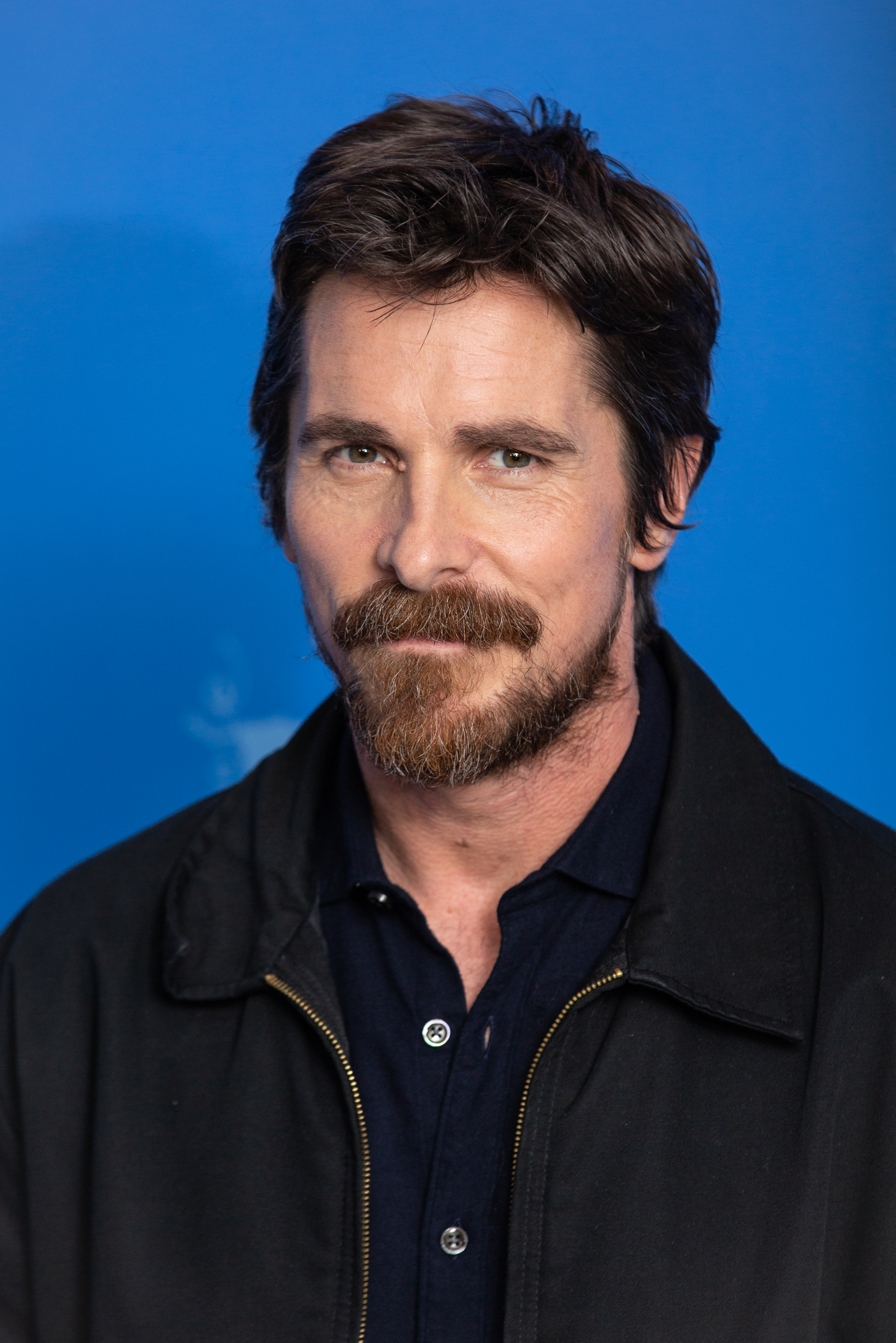
Christian Bale won for Vice (2018)

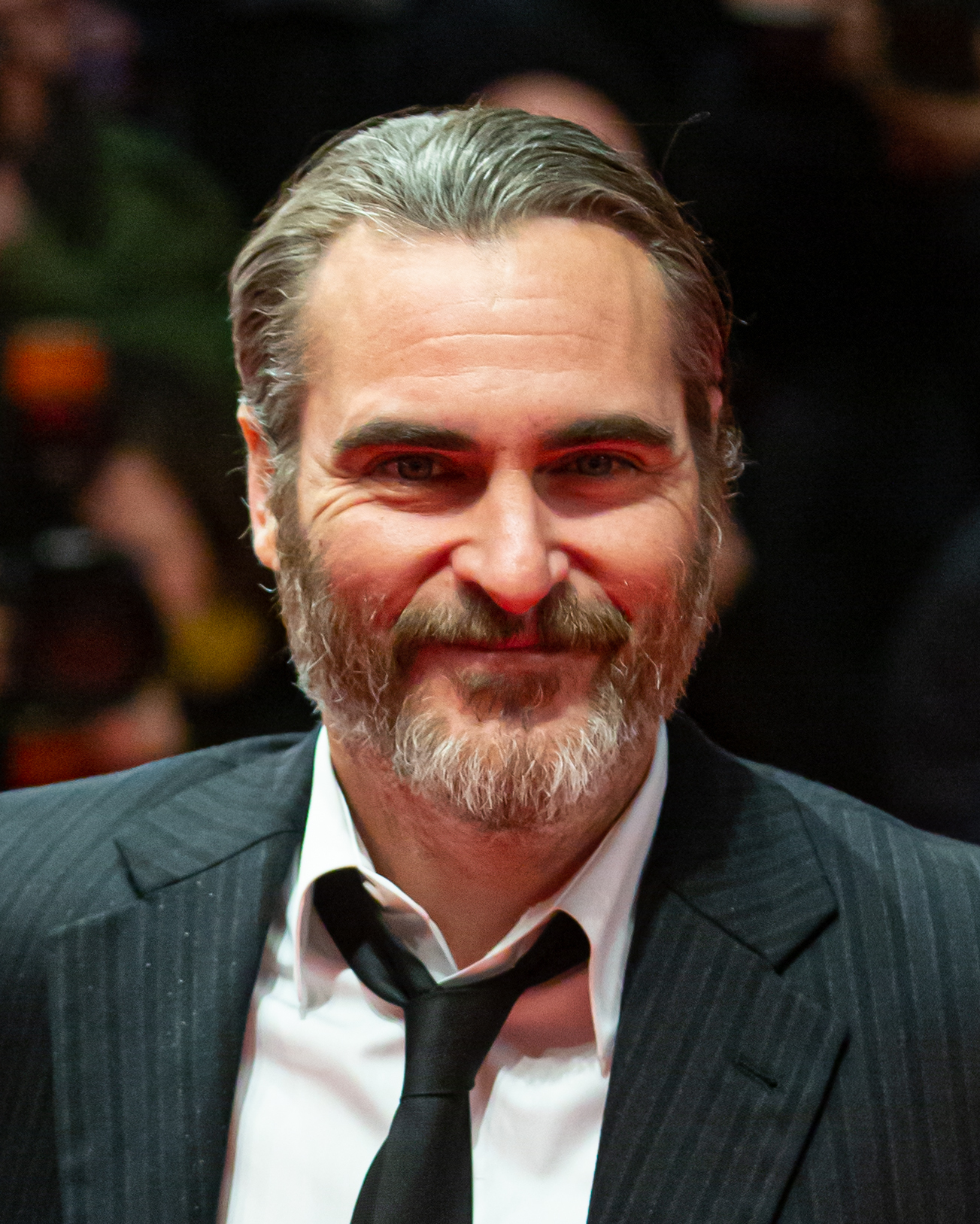
Joaquin Phoenix won for Joker (2019)

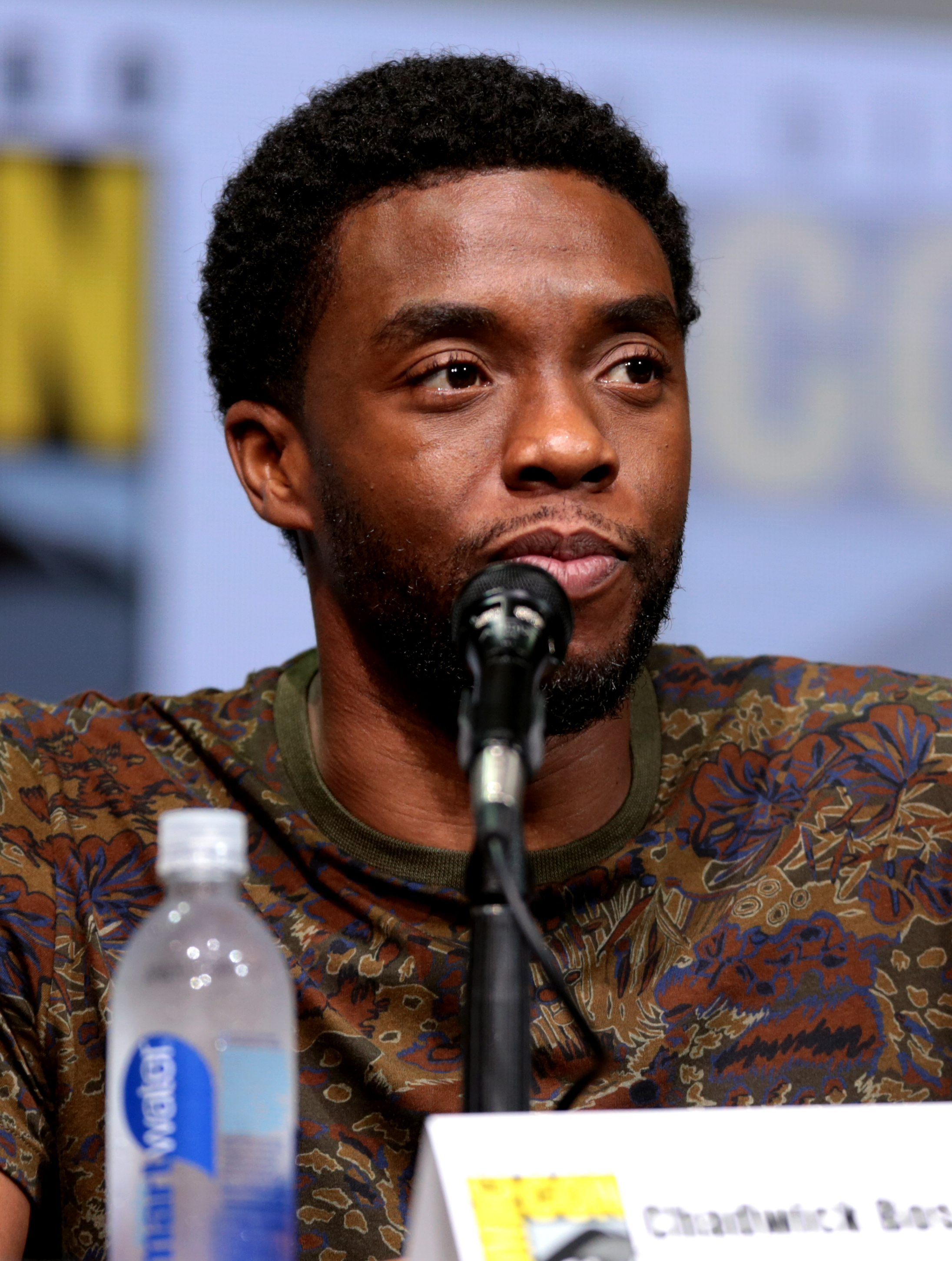
Chadwick Boseman won for Ma Rainey's Black Bottom (2020)

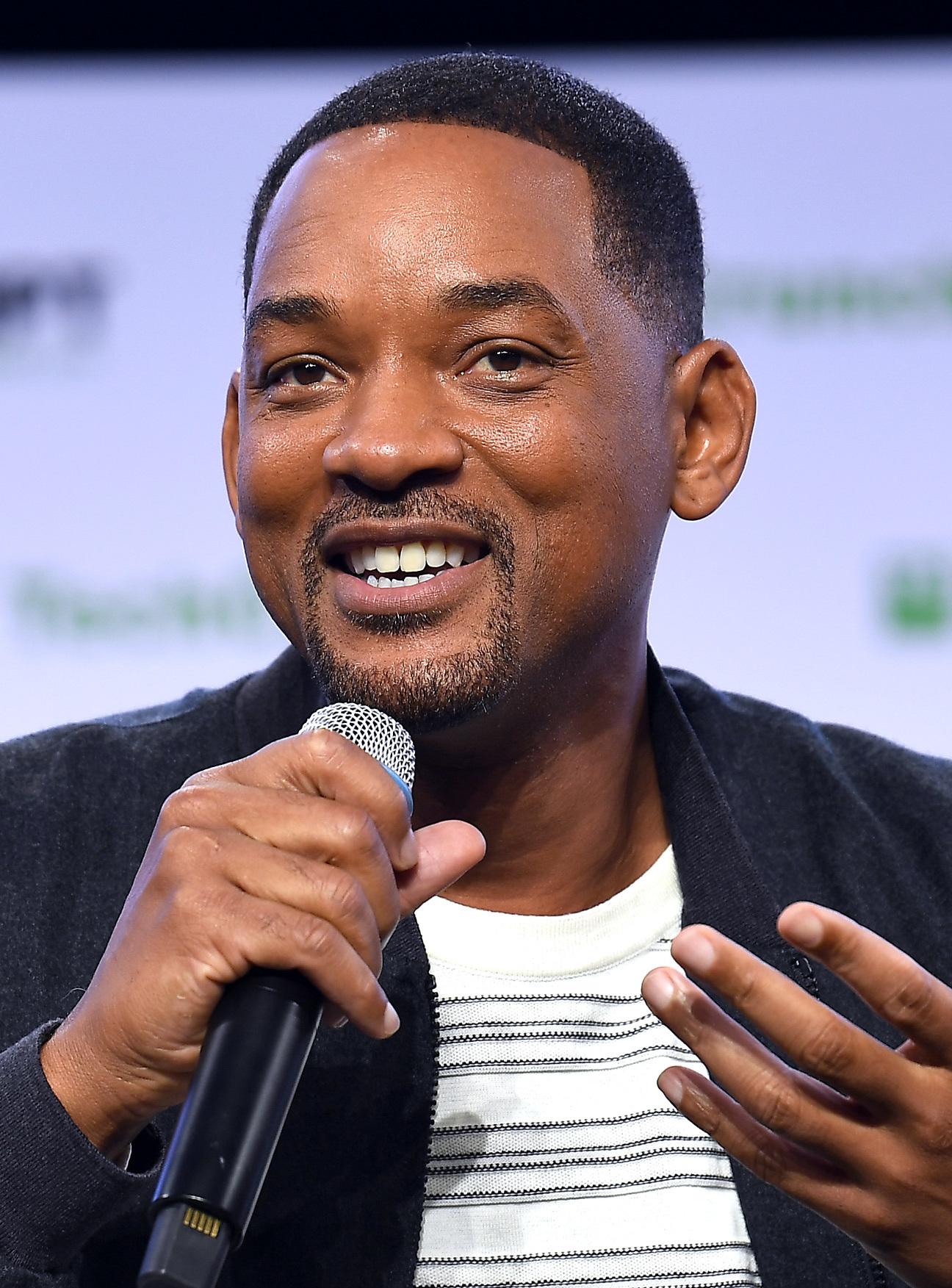
Will Smith won for King Richard (2021)

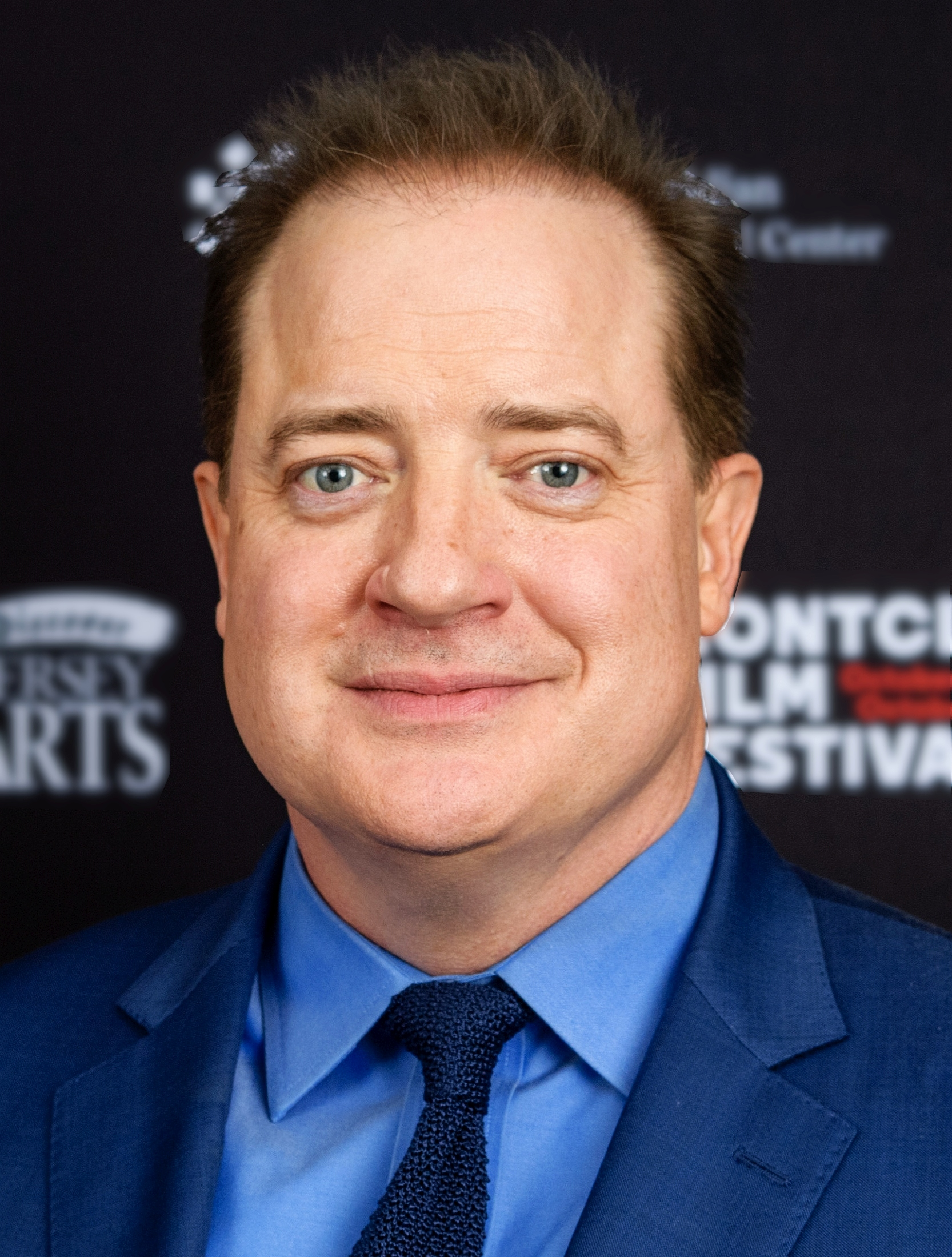
Brendan Fraser won for The Whale (2022)

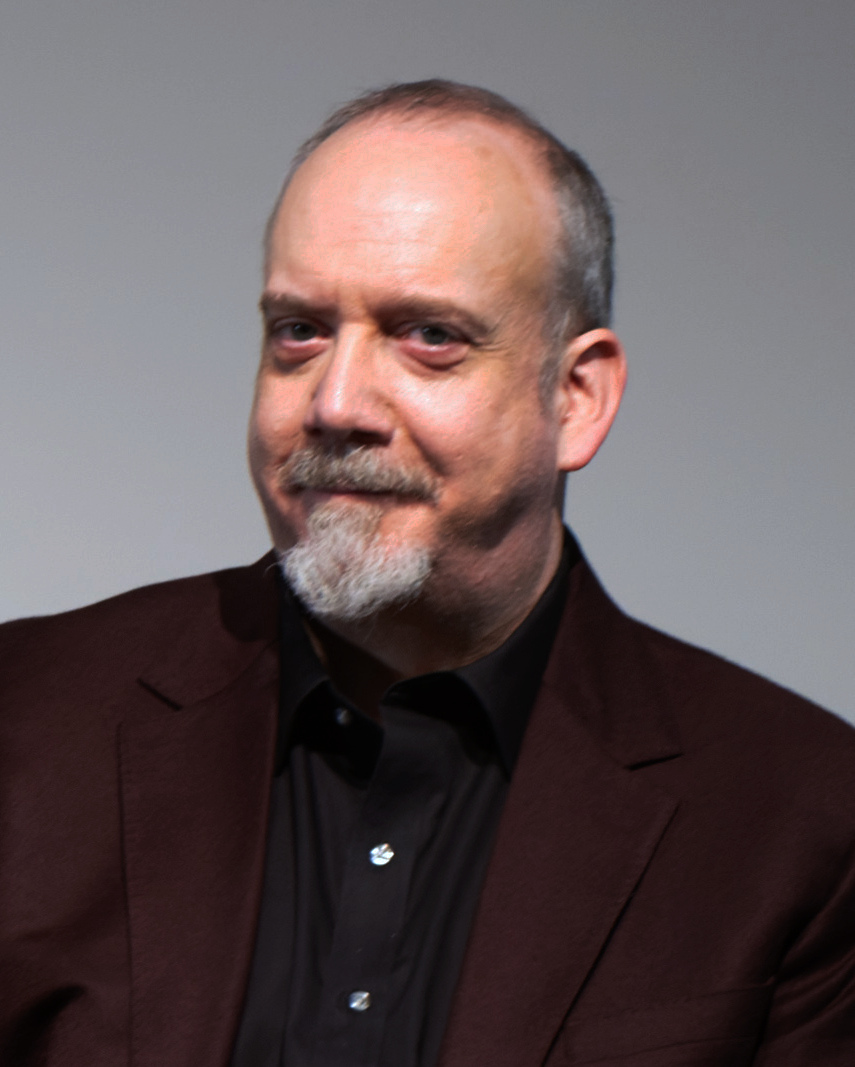
Paul Giamatti won for The Holdovers (2023)

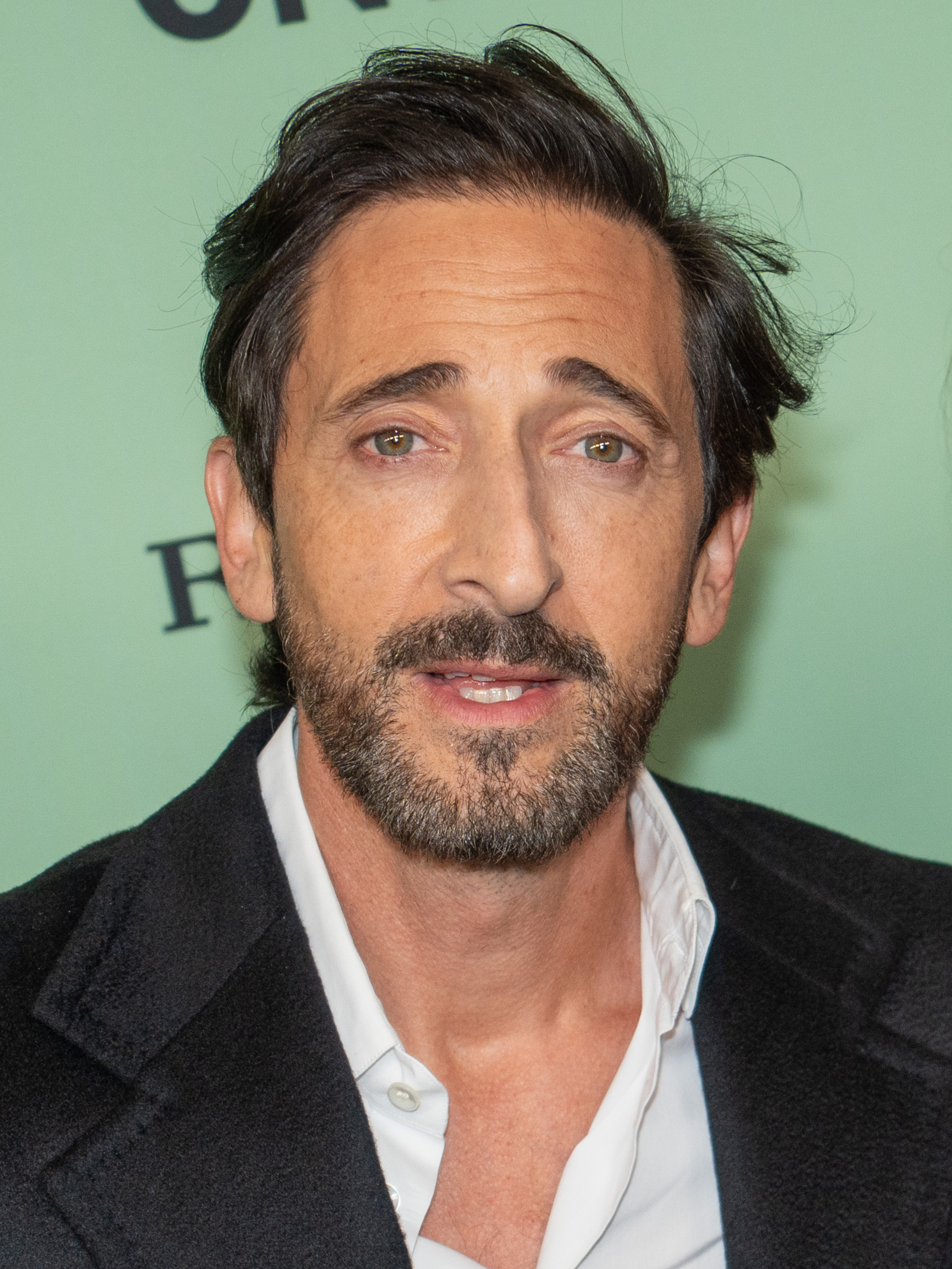
Adrien Brody won for The Brutalist (2024)

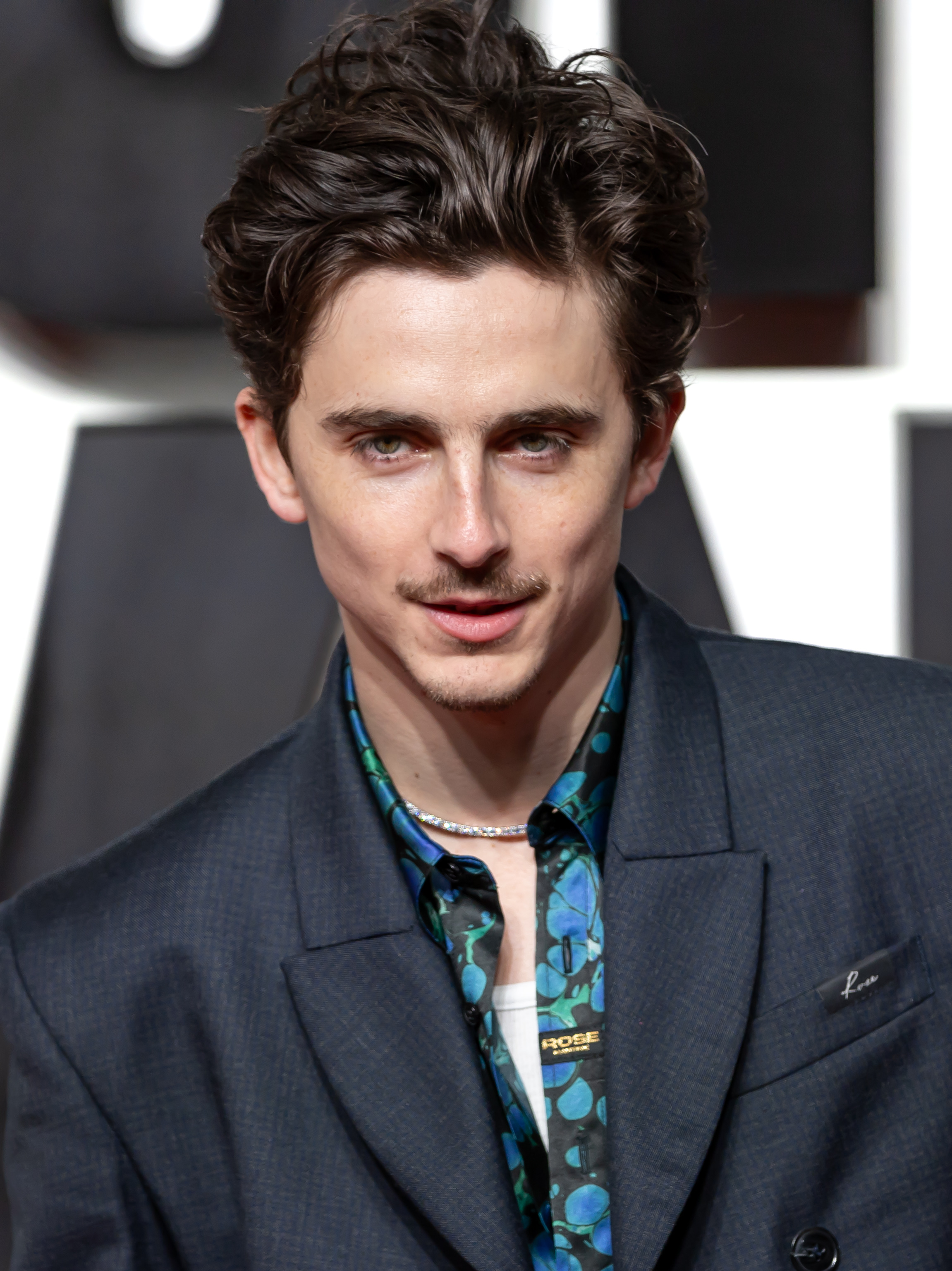
Timothée Chalamet won for Marty Supreme (2025)

=== 1990s ===
Year	Actor	Character	Film
1995	Kevin Bacon	Henri Young	Murder in the First
1996	Geoffrey Rush	David Helfgott	Shine
1997	Jack Nicholson	Melvin Udall	As Good as It Gets
1998	Ian McKellen	James Whale	Gods and Monsters
1999	Russell Crowe	Jeffrey Wigand	The Insider

=== 2000s ===
Year	Actor	Character	Film
2000	Russell Crowe	Maximus Decimus Meridius	Gladiator
2001	Russell Crowe	John Nash	A Beautiful Mind
2001	Sean Penn	Sam Dawson	I Am Sam
2001	Will Smith	Muhammad Ali	Ali
2002	Daniel Day-Lewis (TIE)	William "Bill the Butcher" Cutting	Gangs of New York
2002	Jack Nicholson (TIE)	Warren Schmidt	About Schmidt
2002	Robin Williams	Seymour "Sy" Parrish	One Hour Photo
2003	Sean Penn	Jimmy Markum	Mystic River
2003	Russell Crowe	Captain Jack Aubrey	Master and Commander: The Far Side of the World
2003	Johnny Depp	Captain Jack Sparrow	Pirates of the Caribbean: The Curse of the Black Pearl
2003	Ben Kingsley	Colonel Massoud Amir Behrani	House of Sand and Fog
2003	Bill Murray	Bob Harris	Lost in Translation
2004	Jamie Foxx	Ray Charles	Ray
2004	Javier Bardem	Ramón Sampedro	The Sea Inside
2004	Don Cheadle	Paul Rusesabagina	Hotel Rwanda
2004	Johnny Depp	J. M. Barrie	Finding Neverland
2004	Leonardo DiCaprio	Howard Hughes	The Aviator
2004	Paul Giamatti	Miles Raymond	Sideways
2005	Philip Seymour Hoffman	Truman Capote	Capote
2005	Russell Crowe	James J. Braddock	Cinderella Man
2005	Terrence Howard	DJay	Hustle & Flow
2005	Heath Ledger	Ennis Del Mar	Brokeback Mountain
2005	Joaquin Phoenix	Johnny Cash	Walk the Line
2005	David Strathairn	Edward R. Murrow	Good Night, and Good Luck
2006	Forest Whitaker	Idi Amin	The Last King of Scotland
2006	Leonardo DiCaprio	Danny Archer	Blood Diamond
2006	Leonardo DiCaprio	William "Billy" Costigan Jr.	The Departed
2006	Ryan Gosling	Dan Dunne	Half Nelson
2006	Peter O'Toole	Maurice Russell	Venus
2006	Will Smith	Chris Gardner	The Pursuit of Happyness
2007	Daniel Day-Lewis	Daniel Plainview	There Will Be Blood
2007	George Clooney	Michael Clayton	Michael Clayton
2007	Johnny Depp	Benjamin Barker / Sweeney Todd	Sweeney Todd: The Demon Barber of Fleet Street
2007	Ryan Gosling	Lars Lindstrom	Lars and the Real Girl
2007	Emile Hirsch	Chris McCandless	Into the Wild
2007	Viggo Mortensen	Nikolai Luzhin	Eastern Promises
2008	Sean Penn	Harvey Milk	Milk
2008	Clint Eastwood	Walt Kowalski	Gran Torino
2008	Richard Jenkins	Walter Vale	The Visitor
2008	Frank Langella	Richard Nixon	Frost/Nixon
2008	Brad Pitt	Benjamin Button	The Curious Case of Benjamin Button
2008	Mickey Rourke	Randy "The Ram" Robinson	The Wrestler
2009	Jeff Bridges	Otis "Bad" Blake	Crazy Heart
2009	George Clooney	Ryan Bingham	Up in the Air
2009	Colin Firth	George Falconer	A Single Man
2009	Morgan Freeman	Nelson Mandela	Invictus
2009	Viggo Mortensen	Man	The Road
2009	Jeremy Renner	Sergeant First Class William James	The Hurt Locker

=== 2010s ===
Year	Actor	Character	Film
2010	Colin Firth	King George VI	The King's Speech
2010	Jeff Bridges	Rooster Cogburn	True Grit
2010	Robert Duvall	Felix Bush	Get Low
2010	Jesse Eisenberg	Mark Zuckerberg	The Social Network
2010	James Franco	Aron Ralston	127 Hours
2010	Ryan Gosling	Dean Pereira	Blue Valentine
2011	George Clooney	Matt King	The Descendants
2011	Leonardo DiCaprio	J. Edgar Hoover	J. Edgar
2011	Jean Dujardin	George Valentin	The Artist
2011	Michael Fassbender	Brandon Sullivan	Shame
2011	Ryan Gosling	Driver	Drive
2011	Brad Pitt	Billy Beane	Moneyball
2012	Daniel Day-Lewis	Abraham Lincoln	Lincoln
2012	Bradley Cooper	Patrizio "Pat" Solitano Jr.	Silver Linings Playbook
2012	John Hawkes	Mark O'Brien	The Sessions
2012	Hugh Jackman	Jean Valjean	Les Misérables
2012	Joaquin Phoenix	Freddie Quell	The Master
2012	Denzel Washington	William "Whip" Whitaker Sr.	Flight
2013	Matthew McConaughey	Ron Woodroof	Dallas Buyers Club
2013	Christian Bale	Irving Rosenfeld	American Hustle
2013	Bruce Dern	Woody Grant	Nebraska
2013	Chiwetel Ejiofor	Solomon Northup	12 Years a Slave
2013	Tom Hanks	Captain Richard Phillips	Captain Phillips
2013	Robert Redford	Our Man	All Is Lost
2014	Michael Keaton	Riggan Thomson	Birdman
2014	Benedict Cumberbatch	Alan Turing	The Imitation Game
2014	Ralph Fiennes	Monsieur Gustave H.	The Grand Budapest Hotel
2014	Jake Gyllenhaal	Louis "Lou" Bloom	Nightcrawler
2014	David Oyelowo	Martin Luther King Jr.	Selma
2014	Eddie Redmayne	Stephen Hawking	The Theory of Everything
2015	Leonardo DiCaprio	Hugh Glass	The Revenant
2015	Bryan Cranston	Dalton Trumbo	Trumbo
2015	Matt Damon	Mark Watney	The Martian
2015	Johnny Depp	Whitey Bulger	Black Mass
2015	Michael Fassbender	Steve Jobs	Steve Jobs
2015	Eddie Redmayne	Lili Elbe / Einar Wegener	The Danish Girl
2016	Casey Affleck	Lee Chandler	Manchester by the Sea
2016	Joel Edgerton	Richard Loving	Loving
2016	Andrew Garfield	Desmond T. Doss	Hacksaw Ridge
2016	Ryan Gosling	Sebastian Wilder	La La Land
2016	Tom Hanks	Captain Chesley "Sully" Sullenberger	Sully
2016	Denzel Washington	Troy Maxson	Fences
2017	Gary Oldman	Winston Churchill	Darkest Hour
2017	Timothée Chalamet	Elio Perlman	Call Me by Your Name
2017	Daniel Day-Lewis	Reynolds Woodcock	Phantom Thread
2017	James Franco	Tommy Wiseau	The Disaster Artist
2017	Jake Gyllenhaal	Jeff Bauman	Stronger
2017	Tom Hanks	Ben Bradlee	The Post
2017	Daniel Kaluuya	Chris Washington	Get Out
2018	Christian Bale	Dick Cheney	Vice
2018	Bradley Cooper	Jackson Maine	A Star Is Born
2018	Willem Dafoe	Vincent van Gogh	At Eternity's Gate
2018	Ryan Gosling	Neil Armstrong	First Man
2018	Ethan Hawke	Reverend Ernst Toller	First Reformed
2018	Rami Malek	Freddie Mercury	Bohemian Rhapsody
2018	Viggo Mortensen	Frank "Tony Lip" Vallelonga	Green Book
2019	Joaquin Phoenix	Arthur Fleck / Joker	Joker
2019	Antonio Banderas	Salvador Mallo	Pain and Glory
2019	Robert De Niro	Frank Sheeran	The Irishman
2019	Leonardo DiCaprio	Rick Dalton	Once Upon a Time in Hollywood
2019	Adam Driver	Charlie Barber	Marriage Story
2019	Eddie Murphy	Rudy Ray Moore	Dolemite Is My Name
2019	Adam Sandler	Howard Ratner	Uncut Gems

=== 2020s ===
Year	Actor	Character	Film
2020	Chadwick Boseman (posthumous)	Levee Green	Ma Rainey's Black Bottom
2020	Ben Affleck	Jack Cunningham	The Way Back
2020	Riz Ahmed	Ruben Stone	Sound of Metal
2020	Tom Hanks	Captain Jefferson Kyle Kidd	News of the World
2020	Anthony Hopkins	Anthony	The Father
2020	Delroy Lindo	Paul	Da 5 Bloods
2020	Gary Oldman	Herman J. Mankiewicz	Mank
2020	Steven Yeun	Jacob Yi	Minari
2021	Will Smith	Richard Williams	King Richard
2021	Nicolas Cage	Robin Feld	Pig
2021	Benedict Cumberbatch	Phil Burbank	The Power of the Dog
2021	Peter Dinklage	Cyrano de Bergerac	Cyrano
2021	Andrew Garfield	Jonathan Larson	tick, tick... BOOM!
2021	Denzel Washington	Lord Macbeth	The Tragedy of Macbeth
2022	Brendan Fraser	Charlie	The Whale
2022	Austin Butler	Elvis Presley	Elvis
2022	Tom Cruise	Pete "Maverick" Mitchell	Top Gun: Maverick
2022	Colin Farrell	Pádraic Súilleabháin	The Banshees of Inisherin
2022	Paul Mescal	Calum Patterson	Aftersun
2022	Bill Nighy	Rodney Williams	Living
2023	Paul Giamatti	Paul Hunham	The Holdovers
2023	Bradley Cooper	Leonard Bernstein	Maestro
2023	Leonardo DiCaprio	Ernest Burkhart	Killers of the Flower Moon
2023	Colman Domingo	Bayard Rustin	Rustin
2023	Cillian Murphy	J. Robert Oppenheimer	Oppenheimer
2023	Jeffrey Wright	Thelonious "Monk" Ellison	American Fiction
2024	Adrien Brody	László Tóth	The Brutalist
2024	Timothée Chalamet	Bob Dylan	A Complete Unknown
2024	Daniel Craig	William Lee	Queer
2024	Colman Domingo	John "Divine G" Whitfield	Sing Sing
2024	Ralph Fiennes	Thomas Cardinal Lawrence	Conclave
2024	Hugh Grant	Mr. Reed	Heretic
2025	Timothée Chalamet	Marty Mauser	Marty Supreme
2025	Leonardo DiCaprio	Bob Ferguson	One Battle After Another
2025	Joel Edgerton	Robert Grainier	Train Dreams
2025	Ethan Hawke	Lorenz Hart	Blue Moon
2025	Michael B. Jordan	Elijah "Smoke" Moore / Elias "Stack" Moore	Sinners
2025	Wagner Moura	Armando / Marcelo Alves / Fernando	The Secret Agent

== Multiple nominees ==
8 nominations

- Leonardo DiCaprio

6 nominations

- Ryan Gosling

5 nominations

- Russell Crowe

4 nominations

- Daniel Day-Lewis
- Johnny Depp
- Tom Hanks

3 nominations

- Timothée Chalamet
- George Clooney
- Bradley Cooper
- Viggo Mortensen
- Sean Penn
- Joaquin Phoenix
- Will Smith
- Denzel Washington

2 nominations

- Christian Bale
- Jeff Bridges
- Benedict Cumberbatch
- Colman Domingo
- Joel Edgerton
- Michael Fassbender
- Ralph Fiennes
- Colin Firth
- James Franco
- Andrew Garfield
- Paul Giamatti
- Jake Gyllenhaal
- Ethan Hawke
- Jack Nicholson
- Gary Oldman
- Brad Pitt
- Eddie Redmayne

== Multiple winners ==
3 wins

- Daniel Day-Lewis
- Russell Crowe (consecutive)

2 wins

- Jack Nicholson
- Sean Penn

== See also ==
- Academy Award for Best Actor
- Actor Award for Outstanding Performance by a Male Actor in a Leading Role
- BAFTA Award for Best Actor in a Leading Role
- Golden Globe Award for Best Actor in a Motion Picture – Drama
- Golden Globe Award for Best Actor in a Motion Picture – Musical or Comedy
- Independent Spirit Award for Best Lead Performance
