= Murder in the First =

Murder in the First may refer to:

- Murder in the First (film), a 1995 film starring Christian Slater, Kevin Bacon, and Gary Oldman
- Murder in the First (TV series), a 2014 television detective drama on TNT

== See also ==
- Murder in the first degree, (in US law) an intentional killing that is willful and premeditated with malice aforethought
