= Model Industries Building =

Building in San Francisco, California, United States

Coordinates: 37°49′40″N 122°25′31″W

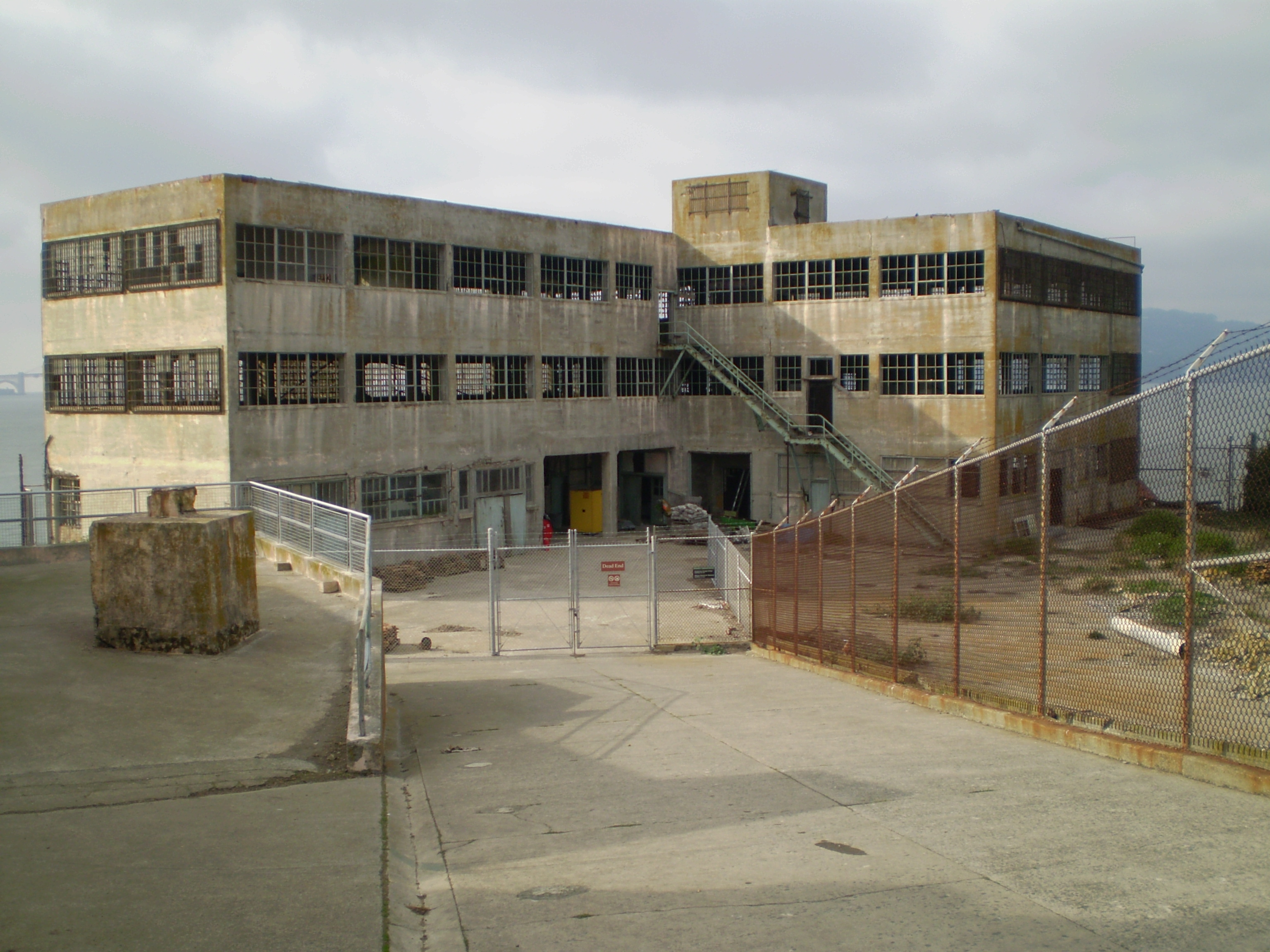
The Model Industries Building

The Model Industries building or Industries Building is a three/four-story building on the northwest corner of Alcatraz Island off the coast of San Francisco, USA. This building was originally built by the U.S. military and was used as a laundry building until the New Industries Building was built as part of a redevelopment program on Alcatraz in 1939 when it was a federal penitentiary. As part of the Alcatraz jail, it held workshops for inmates to work in.

On January 10, 1935, the building shifted to within 2.5 feet from the edge of the cliff following a landslide caused by a severe storm. The warden at the time, James A. Johnston, proposed to extend the seawall next to it and asked the Bureau for $6500 to fund it. He would later claim to dislike the building because it was irregularly shaped. A smaller, cheaper riprap was completed by the end of 1935.

A guard tower and a catwalk from Hill Tower was added to the roof of the Industries Building in June 1936 and the building was made secure with bars from old cells to bar the windows and grill the roof ventilators and to prevent inmates from escaping from the roof. It ceased use as a laundry in 1939 when it was moved to the upper floor of the New Industries Building. Today the building is heavily rusted due decades of exposure to the salt air and wind and the Hill Tower no longer exists. The guard tower formerly located on top of the building now sits across from the Power plant where it is on display.

== Images ==
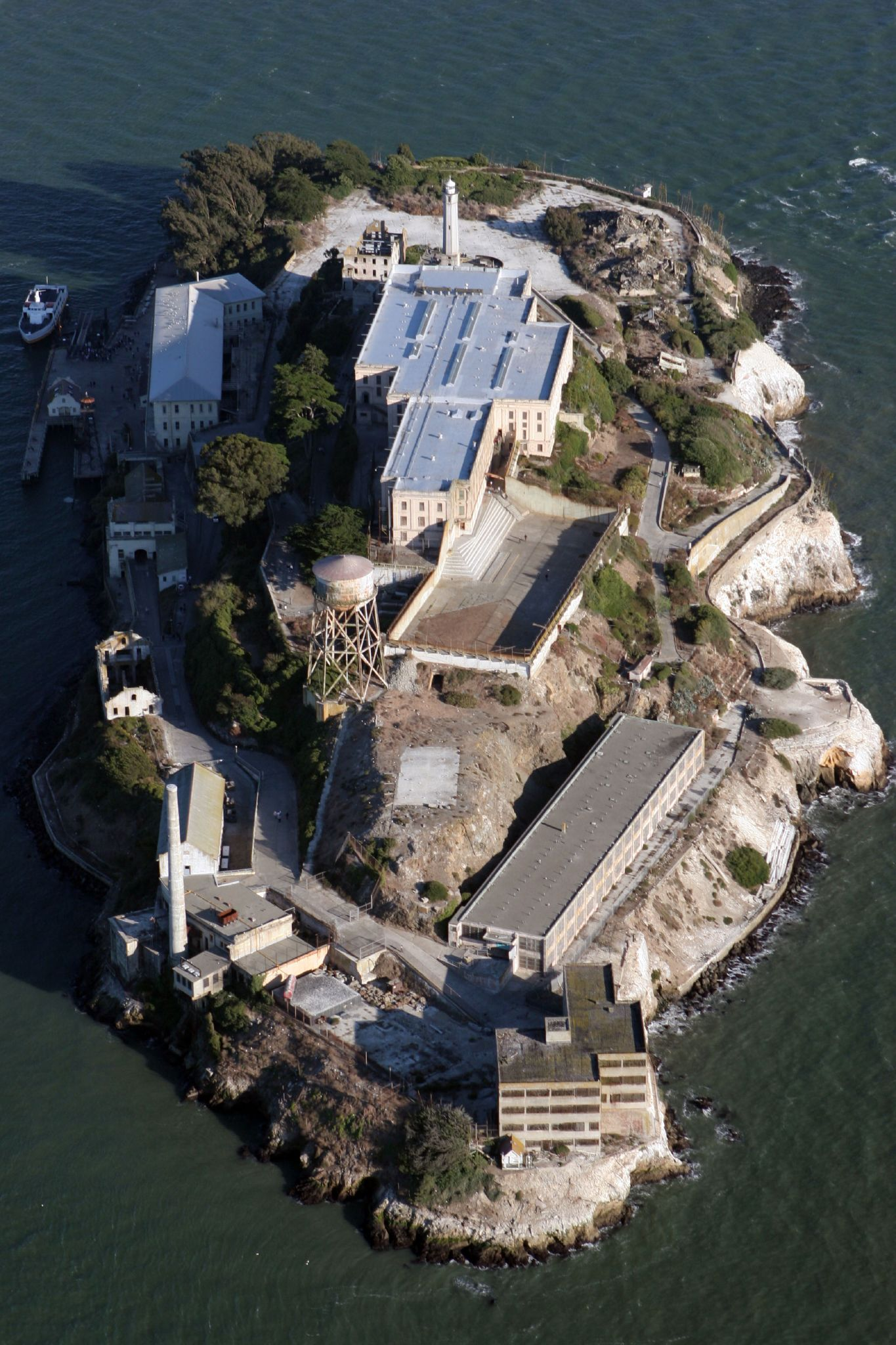
The Model Industries Building is the irregular shaped building on the bottom corner

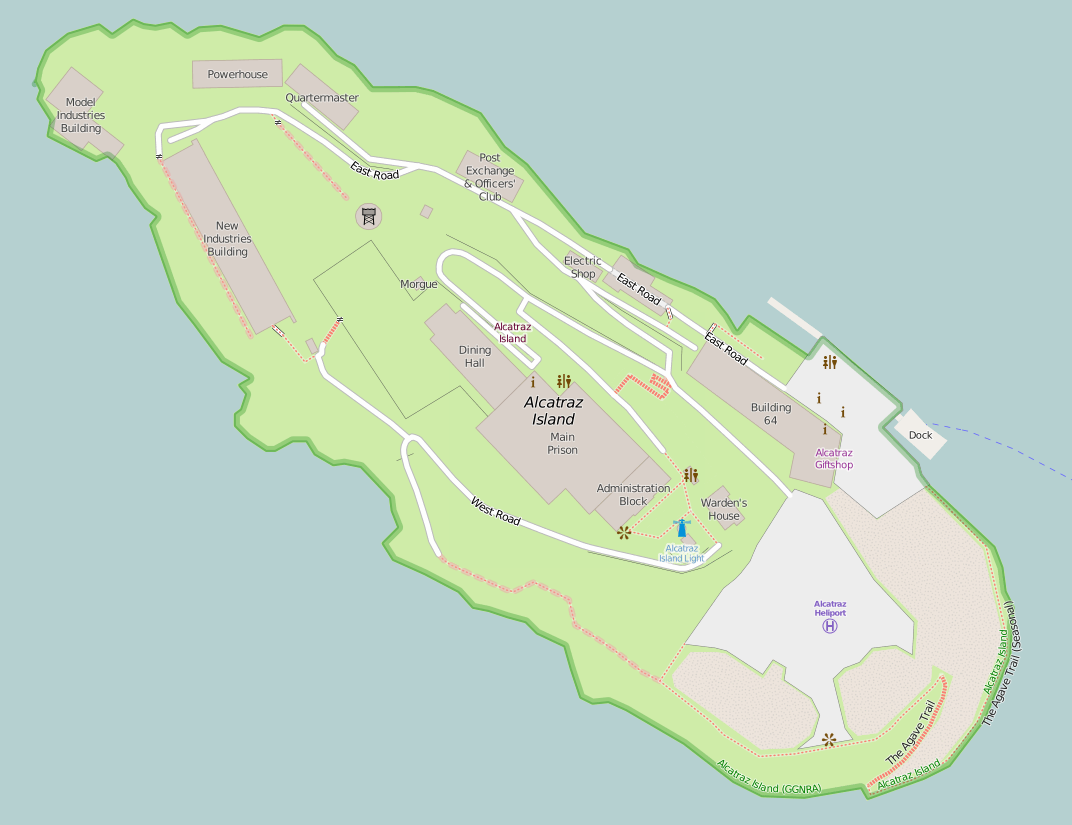
The Model Industries Building is labelled on the map of Alcatraz

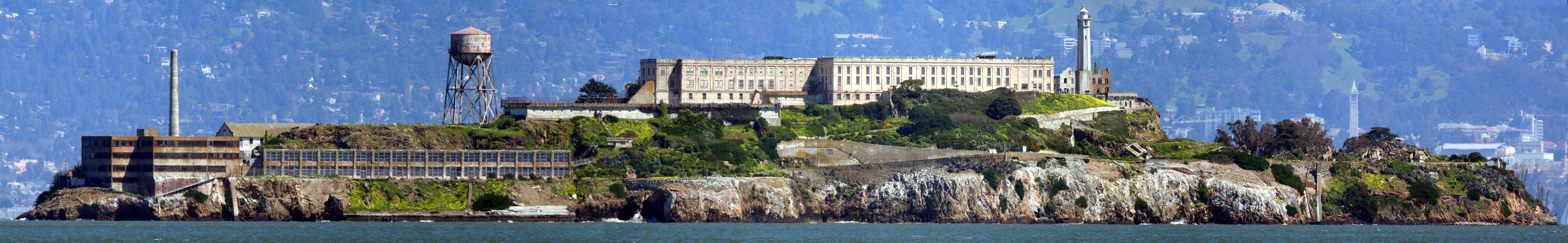
The Model Industries Building is the irregularly shaped rusty building on the left corner.
