= Murder in the First (film) =

- Theatrical release poster
- Directed by: Marc Rocco
- Written by: Dan Gordon
- Produced by: Marc Frydman; Mark Wolper
- Starring: Christian Slater; Kevin Bacon; Gary Oldman; Embeth Davidtz; Brad Dourif; William H. Macy; R. Lee Ermey
- Cinematography: Fred Murphy
- Edited by: Russell Livingstone
- Music by: Christopher Young
- Production companies: Le Studio Canal+ The Wolper Organization
- Distributed by: Warner Bros. (United States and Canada); Le Studio Canal+ (Overseas)
- Release date: January 20, 1995
- Running time: 122 minutes
- Country: United States
- Language: English
- Budget: $20 million
- Box office: $29.5 million

Murder in the First is a 1995 American legal drama film, directed by Marc Rocco, written by Dan Gordon, and starring Christian Slater, Kevin Bacon, Gary Oldman, Embeth Davidtz, Brad Dourif, William H. Macy, and R. Lee Ermey. It tells the alternate history of a petty criminal named Henri Young who is sent to Alcatraz Federal Penitentiary and later put on trial for murder in the first degree as the lawyer representing him recounts Henri's life and when he represented Henri. This film was described on the movie poster as "the trial that took down Alcatraz". The film received a mixed critical response, although Bacon's performance was praised by critics.

== Plot ==
As a 17-year-old orphan, Henri Young went into a grocery store where he was denied work. This leads him to steal $5.00 from a grocery store to feed himself and his little sister Rosetta, both of whom are destitute. He is apprehended by the shopkeeper and arrested by the police while Rosetta is sent to an orphanage. Because that grocery store also housed a U.S. Post Office, his crime is upgraded to a federal offense. Young never sees Rosetta again and is sentenced to Leavenworth Penitentiary, Kansas.

Years later, Henri was transferred to Alcatraz. He gets oppressed by associate prison warden Milton Glenn. Henri participates in an escape attempt with two other prisoners Rufus McCain and Arthur Barker.

The escape plan fails due to the betrayal of McCain. Barker is killed by the guards and Glenn punishes Young by having him sent to "the hole", which is in Alcatraz's dungeons as he and Warden James Humson do a press conference proving that Alcatraz is inescapable. Glenn also had Henri tortured where he was struck in the back with a club, thrown down the stairs at one point, striking his face with a blackjack, and left naked in the hole at one point. Glenn even used a straight razor on his ankle to induce a hobble on Henri. Except for 30 minutes on Christmas Day in 1940, he is left in there for three years. The solitary confinement causes Young to lose his sanity.

On release back to the general population, he experiences a psychotic episode in the prison cafeteria and attacks McCain, stabbing him to death with a spoon in full view of the prison staff and the other convicts.

Young is put on trial in San Francisco for first degree murder in what district attorney William McNeil and the public defender's office run by Mr. Henkin believe is an open-and-shut case. Public defender James Stamphill, a recent graduate of Harvard Law School, is given the case and bluntly told that Young is going to be sentenced to death and that he was assigned because a competent attorney would be wasted on such a lost cause. After discovering the facts of Young's case, Stamphill attempts to put Alcatraz on trial by alleging that its harsh conditions drove him insane with his motives causing the dismay of Mr. Henkin, Stamphill's co-worker Mary McCasslin, and Stamphill's brother Byron. They demand he go along with railroading Young but he ignores them. During one of his visits, Stamphill brought pleasure to Young by bringing in a prostitute named Blanche.

The trial overseen by Judge Clawson becomes highly politicized and contentious, with Clawson overruling most of Stamphill's questions regardless of whether the objections are legally valid. Glenn denied any mistreatment of Young while Stamphill mentioned that anyone who went mad at Alcatraz was removed and never made it to the asylum. As Stamphill questioned ex-guard Derek Simpson who admitted that Glenn had him partake in the torture, McNeil objects because Simpson was fired because he was drunk. This causes Clawson to have the jury disregard Simpson's testimony. Stamphill also held Humson accountable for not being present during Glenn's actions towards Young, claiming that Humson never interacted with Young once as Humson claims that he runs two other prisons. The most damning evidence Stamphill gets on the record is that Alcatraz broke numerous laws regarding prisoner confinement and have no real defense for these actions much to Clawson's visible annoyance.

At one point in between the trial, Stamphill managed to track down Rosetta and brought her to visit Henri. He learns that Rosetta is doing alright and has named her baby after him.

Young tells Stamphill that he wants to change the plea to guilty as he would rather be dead than be sent back to Alcatraz, but he trusts Stamphill enough by that point to keep from doing so. Young is convicted of involuntary manslaughter and not first-degree murder as the jury recommends that Alcatraz should undergo a federal investigation because Humson and Glenn likely committed crimes against humanity. Stamphill tells Young that he will appeal to have him sent to another prison and see if he can reopen Young's original case. Stamphill's narration states that this would be the last time he saw Young alive as he would later be found dead in his cell where he had "victory" written on the walls and he did not die in vain. Young is returned to Alcatraz and put in "the hole" on Glenn's orders with Young claiming that he still won either way as the inmates bang on the cells.

As Young is taken to "the hole", Stamphill's narration states that the Supreme Court agreed with the facts of the trial six month later which led to the dungeons of Alcatraz being closed forever. Glenn was brought up on charges of mistreatment. He would be found guilty and never work in the US penal system again. While noting that he still remained in the private practice, Stamphill in his narration thanked Young for making him a baseball fan and concludes his narration by stating "You did it, Henri"!

A postscript states that Alcatraz as a prison was closed down forever in 1963. It remains a tourist attraction that is visited by over one million tourists a year.

== Cast ==
- Christian Slater as James Stamphill, a defense attorney who represents Henri Young. He also serves as the narrator of the film.
- Kevin Bacon as Henri Young, a young man sent to Alcatraz for petty theft.
- Gary Oldman as Milton Glenn, the associate prison warden of Alcatraz.
- Embeth Davidtz as Mary McCasslin, a lawyer who is the co-worker of James.
- William H. Macy as D.A. William McNeil, the district attorney who prosecutes Young.
- Brad Dourif as Byron Stamphill, James’ brother, who is also a lawyer.
- R. Lee Ermey as Judge Clawson, a judge who oversees the trial of Henri Young and gets annoyed with Stamphill.
- Stephen Tobolowsky as Mr. Henkin, Stamphill's boss.
- Mia Kirshner as Rosetta Young, the fictional sister of Henri Young who would later get engaged to a man named Mr. Dial.
  - Amanda Borden as young Rosetta Young
- Ben Slack as Jerry Hoolihan
- Stefan Gierasch as James Humson, the prison warden of Alcatraz and Glenn's boss who is also the warden of San Quentin State Prison and Folsom State Prison.
- Kyra Sedgwick as Blanche, a prostitute that James brings to visit Henri.
- Charles Boswell as Derek Simpson, a guard at Alcatraz who assisted Glenn in torturing Henri before he was later fired.
- David Michael Sterling as Rufus McCain, an inmate who takes part in Young's early escape attempt and betrays him to Glenn which led to McCain's death.
- Michael Melvin as Arthur "Doc" Barker, an inmate who takes part in Young's early escape attempt and is killed by the guards.
- Tony Barr as Winthrop
- Stuart Nisbet as Harv
- Gary Ballard as Terrence Swenson, an Alcatraz guard.
- Randy Pelish as Wimer, an Alcatraz guard.
- Neil Summers as Whitney, an Alcatraz guard.
- Sonny King as Wimer, an Alcatraz guard.
- Theo Mayes as a prison barber
- Wally Rose as the shopkeeper of a grocery store that Henri tries to rob.
- Eve Brenner as Winthrop's secretary
- Clay Davis as courtroom photographer

The men on the street were portrayed by Bill Barretta, Randy Dudly, William Hall, Sheldon Feldner, Fred Franklin, and Joseph Lucas.

== Production ==
=== Filming ===
To prepare for his role as Henri Young, Kevin Bacon spent a night in a solitary cell and lost twenty pounds.

Principal photography began on December 13, 1993 in Los Angeles, California, with the courtroom sequences being filmed first. On January 17, 1994, filming at Triscenic Production Services Inc. in Sylmar was interrupted by the 1994 Northridge earthquake. Filming resumed two weeks after the quake, and in February, the production moved to Alcatraz Island in the San Francisco Bay. Filming there had to be done at night, because the National Park Service did not want to disrupt daily tourism in the daytime. More than 300 crew members had to be crammed in the prison cells. Production wrapped on March 12, 1994.

=== Historical accuracy ===
The film makes numerous changes to historical events. The real Henri Young was not convicted of stealing $5 to save his sister from destitution. He had been a hardened bank robber who had taken a hostage on at least one occasion and had committed a murder in 1933. Young was also no stranger to the penal system. Before being incarcerated at Alcatraz in 1936, he had already served time in two state prisons in Montana and Washington. In 1935 he spent his first year in federal correctional facilities at McNeil Island, Washington before being transferred to Alcatraz.

The film ends with the fictional Henri Young being returned to the dungeons of Alcatraz in the early 1940s where he supposedly dies. The real Young remained on Alcatraz until 1948 before he was moved to the United States Medical Center for Federal Prisoners at Springfield, Missouri where he stayed until 1954. While on Alcatraz he remained in the main cell block. Young was not kept in dungeons which had been closed almost one decade earlier. In 1954, Young was transferred to the Washington State Penitentiary at Walla Walla to begin a life sentence for the murder conviction in 1933.

In 1972, after Young was released from Washington State Penitentiary at age 61, he jumped parole. According to Washington State authorities his whereabouts remain unknown.

According to the San Francisco Examiner, April 16, 1941, the Defense stated in court that Henri Young was locked up in solitary confinement for over three years. This is taken directly from the paper, "Emphasis which they repeatedly laid on the fact that Young was in isolation or solitary confinement for more than three years—and that he drove his knife into McCain’s abdomen just eleven days after release from such confinement, made it clear that the defense hopes to show not only that Young was “punch-drunk” but that the punches were administered by the Alcatraz "system".

Four other prisoners attempted to escape Alcatraz with Young, not just two. One of the men omitted from the film (Dale Stamphill) has the same last name as Young's lawyer.

Many of the ideas in the movie were taken directly from newspaper articles of the trials, including the ending scene where the jury only convicts Young of manslaughter, and requests that Alcatraz be investigated.

== Release ==
The film was released on January 20, 1995, in 1,237 theaters in the U.S. and Canada and grossed $4,719,188 in its opening weekend. The film went on to gross $17,381,942 in the U.S. and Canada and $29.5 million worldwide against a $20 million budget.

== Reception ==
On review aggregate website Rotten Tomatoes, Murder in the First has a score of 56% based on reviews from 39 critics. The site's consensus states: "Despite a strong cast and story inspired by incredible real-life events, Murder in the First is strictly second rate." Audiences polled by CinemaScore gave the film an average grade of "A−" on an A+ to F scale.

Though Bacon received praise for his performance, critics negatively cited the film's handheld camera shots, scenes of brutality, and underdeveloped characters. Mick LaSalle of the San Francisco Chronicle wrote, "'Murder in the First' lacks an all-important core of emotion. It tries to find it in the growing friendship between the lawyer and the client on trial for murder, with scenes of the lawyer trying to draw the convict out — and of the two men talking freely. But the friendship never seems more than a device."

Roger Ebert gave the film two out of four stars, and said Slater "is an actor with talent, but he is too young for this role, and not confident enough to dial [his performance] down a little". Owen Gleiberman of Entertainment Weekly wrote, "when Henri’s moment in court finally arrives, Murder in the First denies us the one thing we most want to hear: an account of how his ordeal felt from the inside out. The film’s true drama — what it does to a person to live in hell — remains locked up in Henri’s head".

Screenwriter Dan Gordon, who was unhappy with the film version of his script, wrote a novelization of his screenplay and later adapted it into a stage play.

== Awards and nominations ==
Kevin Bacon won the Critics' Choice Award for Best Actor and was nominated for a Screen Actors Guild Award for Outstanding Performance by a Male Actor in a Supporting Role.
