= Broadcast Film Critics Association Awards 1996 =

Broadcast Film Critics Association Awards 1996 may refer to:

- 1st Critics' Choice Awards, the first Critics' Choice Awards ceremony that took place in 1996
- 2nd Critics' Choice Awards, the second Critics' Choice Awards ceremony that took place in 1997 and which honored the best in film for 1996
