= New Industries Building =

Building in San Francisco, California, United States

Coordinates: 37.827418°N 122.424608°W

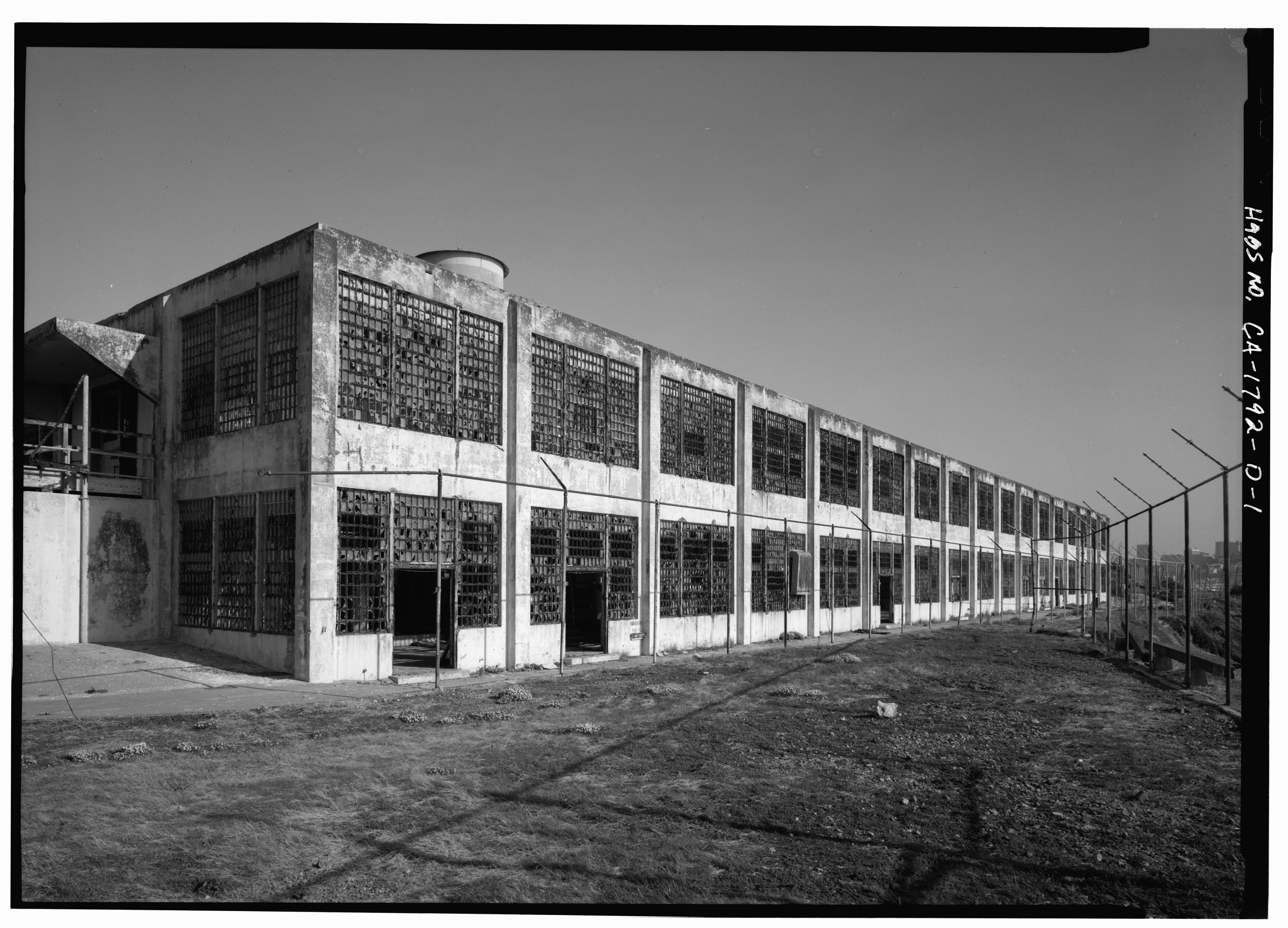
The New Industries Building

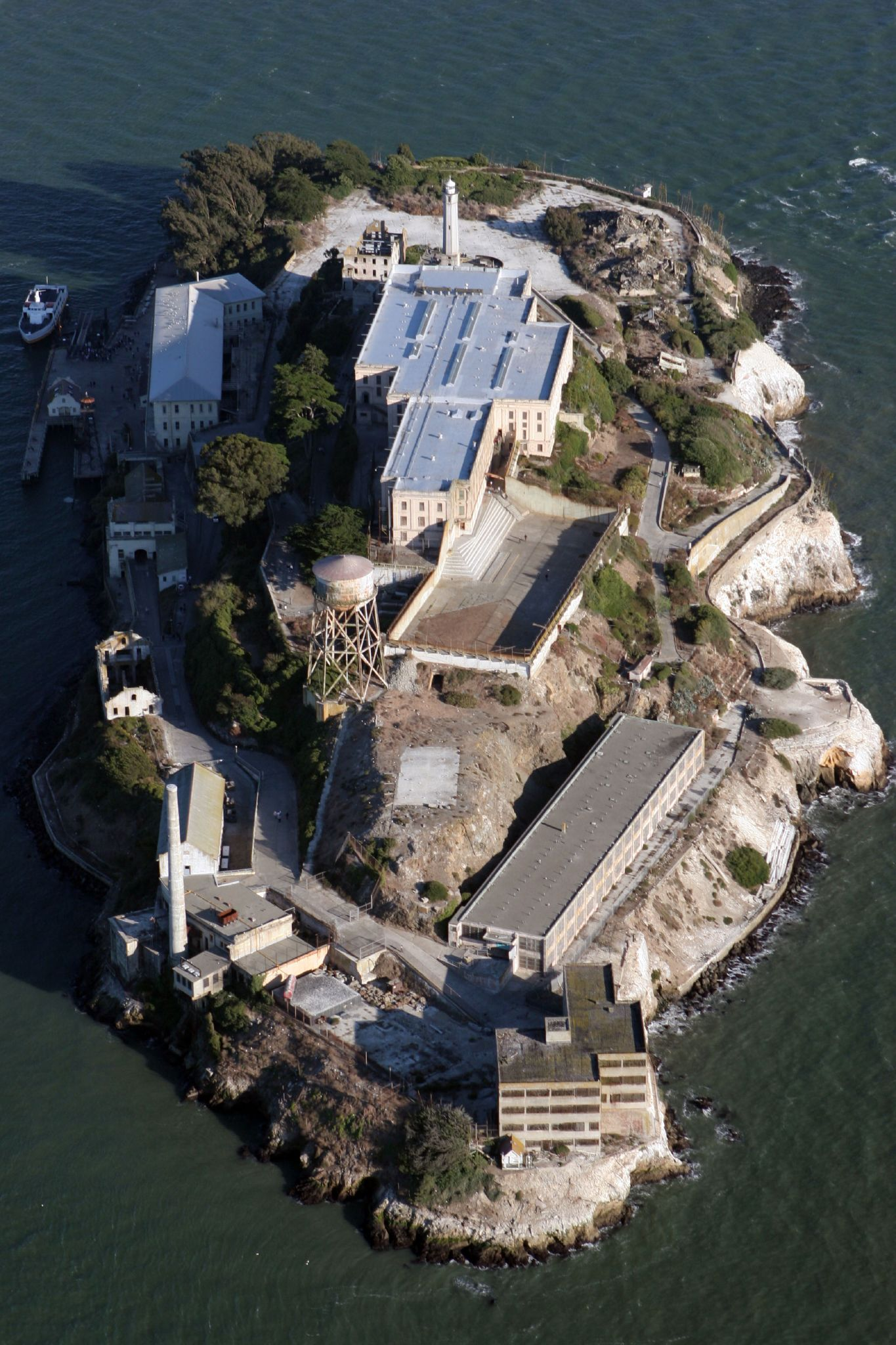
The New Industries Building is the long building on the bottom right, beyond the irregularly shaped Model Industries Building

The New Industries Building is a building on the western end of Alcatraz Island off the coast of San Francisco, United States. It was constructed in 1939 for $186,000 as part of a $1.1 million modernization scheme which also included the water tower, power house, officers quarters and remodeling of the D-block.

The ground floor of the two-story 306 ft long building contained a clothing factory, dry cleaning plant, furniture plant, brush factory, and an office, where prisoners of the federal penitentiary could work for money. They made items such as gloves, furniture mats, and army uniforms. The laundry room occupied the entire upper floor, the largest in San Francisco at the time. Each window has 9 panes and there are 17 bays on each floor on either side.

In recent years the building has been updated to address the erosion of the concrete and rust had caused, strengthen the walls and floors, repairing the roof and adding weatherproofed windows and door openings. The Guard Tower on the top of the building was also renovated and remounted.

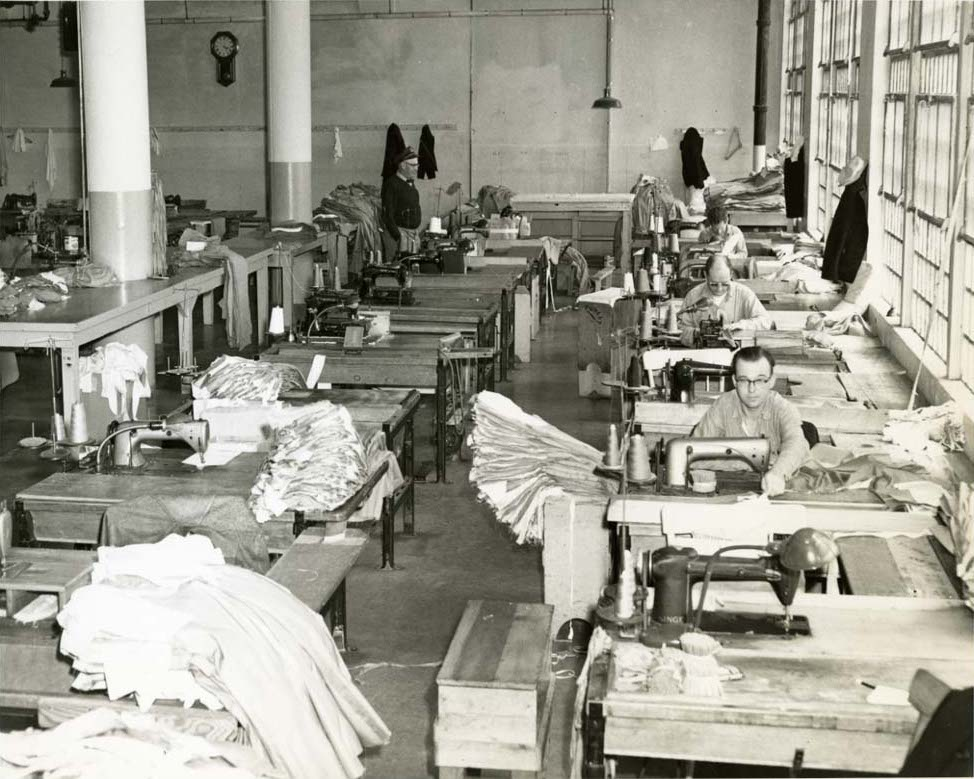
Inmates working in the sewing room

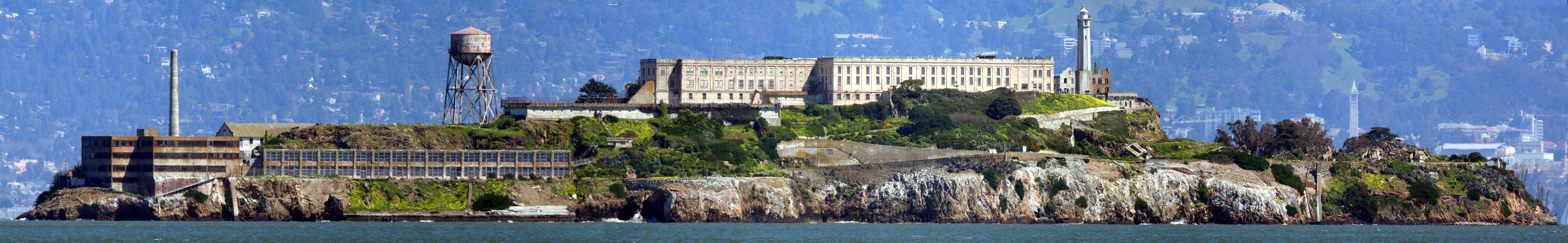
The New Industries Building is the long two-storey building second from the left.
