= Rufus McCain =

Alcatraz Prison inmate (1903–1940)

- Born: Rufus Roy McCain; July 7, 1903; New York City, New York, U.S.
- Died: December 3, 1940 (aged 37); Alcatraz Federal Penitentiary, San Francisco, California, U.S.
- Known for: attempted escape from Alcatraz

Rufus Roy McCain (July 7, 1903 – December 3, 1940) was a prisoner at Alcatraz who attempted escape with Henri Young and Arthur Barker in 1939.

== Escape Attempt ==
On the night of January 13, 1939, Rufus McCain, Henri Young, Arthur "Doc" Barker, Dale Stamphill, and William Martin, attempted to escape from Alcatraz The five men escaped from the isolation unit of the cell house by sawing through the iron cell bars and bending the bars on the window. They then went to the water's edge, where correctional officers found them on the shoreline on the west side of the island. Martin, Young, and McCain surrendered. The guards shot at Barker and Stamphill when they refused to surrender, and Barker eventually died from his injuries.

McCain and Young were sentenced to almost 22 months each in the solitary confinement cells of D-Block, a punishment that subjected them to severe isolation and minimal human interaction. Locked in their cells for nearly 23 hours a day, they experienced only occasional moments outside for showers or solitary exercise. This form of punishment is widely recognized as one of the harshest forms of punishment. Current research shows that solitary confinement, especially for extended periods of time with extreme conditions, is harmful to the incarcerates' mental well-being. Few if any other forms of punishment produce as much psychological trauma and symptoms.

After their time in solitary confinement, Young and McCain returned to the normal prison population in Alcatraz. Returning to normal prison life meant adapting to the highly regimented and strict environment overseen by Warden James Johnston, known for his harsh disciplinarian approach. Johnston considered work not to be a right, but a privilege to be earned. Like all other prisoners, McCain and Young had to apply to Warden Johnston for a work assignment. McCain was assigned to the tailoring shop and Young to the furniture shop located directly upstairs.

== Death ==
On December 3, 1940, Young waited until just after the 10 a.m. count to run downstairs and stab McCain with a sharpened wooden spoon. McCain fell quickly into shock and died five hours later. Young refused to disclose his motive for the murder and the purpose of his actions remain to be unknown.
