= Henri Young =

American convicted bank robber and murderer

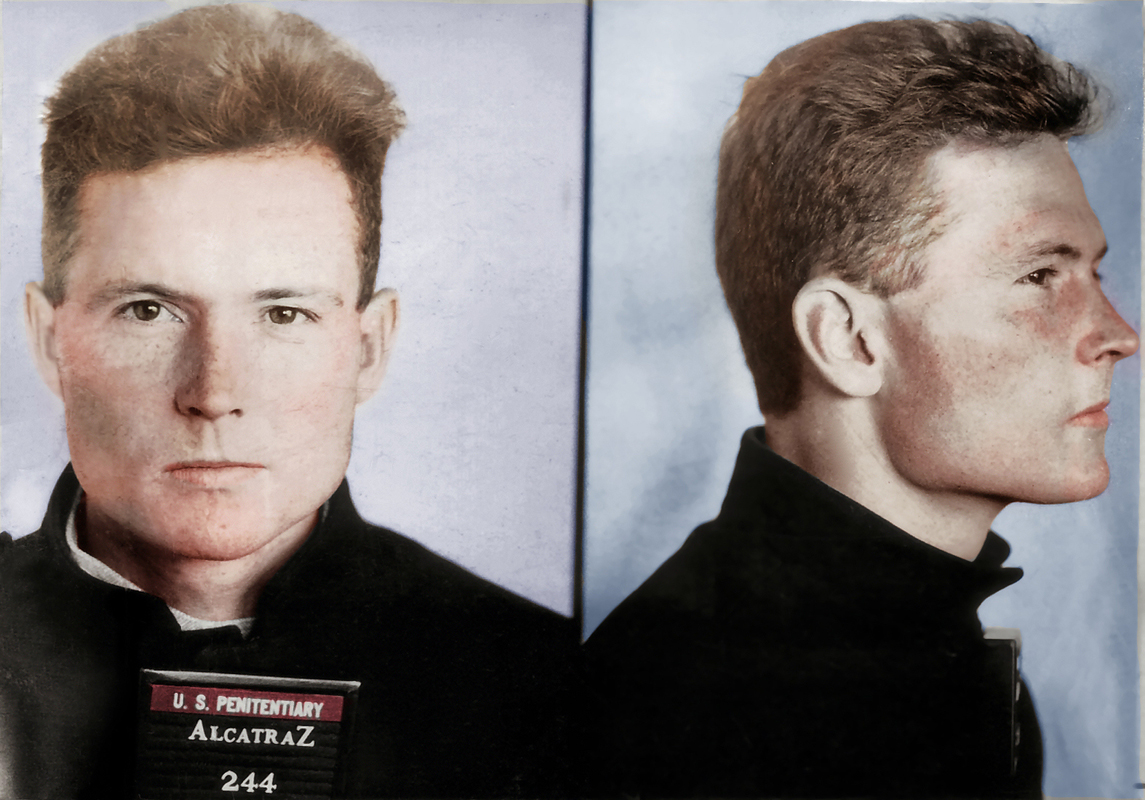
- Born: Henri Theodore Young; June 20, 1911; Kansas City, Missouri, U.S.
- Disappeared: 1972 (aged 60–61); Washington, U.S.
- Died: after 1972
- Other name: Henri Theodore Young
- Status: Parole escape
- Criminal charges: manslaughter, bank robbery

Henri Theodore Young (born June 20, 1911 – disappeared 1972) was an American convicted bank robber and murderer who, while serving one of a series of prison terms, attempted to escape from Alcatraz Federal Penitentiary with four other inmates in 1939. During the escape attempt, two inmates, Dale Stamphill and Arthur "Doc" Barker, were shot, the latter fatally. All survivors were quickly recaptured. Two of the men, Young and Rufus McCain, were sentenced to solitary confinement and served the terms at Alcatraz for a period of three years (until autumn of 1942). Eleven days after re-entering the Alcatraz general prison population in 1940, Young murdered McCain.

No apparent motive was ever disclosed for the murder. However, according to prisoner 325 Alvin Karpis, Young blamed McCain for the failure of the escape attempt. McCain couldn't swim and Barker refused to leave anyone behind so they began trying to hastily make a raft from driftwood. The dense fog cleared and the guards spotted them. Young's defense in the subsequent trial put the spotlight on Alcatraz and the penal system, leading to questions about how the prison was run. In 1948, Young was transferred to the United States Medical Center for Federal Prisoners in Springfield, Missouri. Upon completion of his federal sentence, he was transferred to Washington State Penitentiary at Walla Walla to begin a life sentence for a 1933 murder conviction.

After release from Walla Walla, Young "jumped parole" in 1972 and his whereabouts were reported as "unknown". He was portrayed as a fictional character of the same name in the film Murder in the First (1995), in which he was played by actor Kevin Bacon. Young is also the subject of the song "Behind the Eyes of Henri Young", featured on the album Dragonfly (2017), by Australian singer Kasey Chambers.

== Life ==
Young was born in Kansas City, Missouri on June 20, 1911. He grew up surrounded by insecurity and poverty with unstable parental figures–his machinist father taught him how to steal at a young age, and his parents divorced when he was 14. When Young's mother remarried three years later, Young set off from home due to issues with his new stepfather. Beginning a life of crime, Young set off on a spree of robberies, burglaries and kidnappings throughout the West.

In 1933, Young was convicted of murder in Washington State Penitentiary. After robbing the First National Bank of Lind in 1935 for $405, he received a 20 year sentence to USP McNeil Island.

Officials at McNeil soon began to plead for Young's transfer to USP Alcatraz, one attorney describing him as "the worst and most dangerous criminal with whom [he'd] ever dealt". The warden of McNeil Island labeled him "vicious, unscrupulous and a fomenter of trouble".

Thusly, Young was transferred to Alcatraz on June 1, 1935. In his time on the Rock, Young racked up a total of 34 write-ups for misconduct.

On the night of January 13, 1939, Young, along with prisoners Rufus McCain, Arthur "Doc" Barker, Dale Stamphill and William Martin, attempted to escape, marking the 4th escape attempt from Alcatraz. The group had gradually pried open bars in the D Block isolation cells as well as used a bar spreader to break the bars on the cell windows. The men then made their way down to the frigid shores and attempted to construct a crude raft. Time for the escapees quickly ran dry as guards found their cells empty and sounded the alarm. Martin, Young and McCain surrendered, while Barker and Stamphill refused to surrender and were subsequently shot. Barker eventually died from his injuries.

Young recounted the escape:

"My heart was in my mouth. I felt strange, nervous, like a. man in a dream. On the beach we hurriedly threw together a makeshift raft, tying the lumber we had gathered with the sheets we carried. We stripped and made bundles of our clothes and put them on the raft. We swarm out, pushing the raft before us. Thirty yards out, McCain called for a halt. He said that the raft was weak, in danger of falling apart. He insisted on going back for more lumber to strengthen our raft."

– Young's account of the 1939 escape attempt

Seemingly blaming Rufus McCain for the 1939 escape attempt's failure, on December 3, 1940, Young used two knives he obtained through his prison job to brutally murder McCain, gouging them deep into his accomplice's gut. At his trial for McCain's murder in 1942, Young and his attorney argued that the harsh system at Alcatraz had brutalized and dehumanized him. According to the San Francisco Examiner,

"Emphasis which [the defense] repeatedly laid on the fact that Young was in isolation or solitary confinement for more than three years—and that he drove his knife into McCain's abdomen just eleven days after release from such confinement, made it clear that the defense hopes to show not only that Young was 'punch drunk' but that the punches were administered by the Alcatraz 'system'."

Describing conditions in solitary confinement, Young said:

Its size was approximately that of a regular cell—9 feet by 5 feet by about 7 feet high. I could just touch the ceiling by stretching out my arm ... You are stripped nude and pushed into the cell. Guards take your clothes and go over them minutely for what few grains of tobacco may have fallen into the cuffs or pockets. There is no soap. No tobacco. No toothbrush. The smell—well you can describe it only by the word 'stink.' It is like stepping into a sewer. It is nauseating. After they have searched your clothing, they throw it at you. For bedding, you get two blankets, around 5 in the evening. You have no shoes, no bed, no mattress—nothing but the four damp walls and two blankets. The walls are painted black. Once a day I got three slices of bread—no—that is an error. Some days I got four slices. I got one meal in five days, and nothing but bread in between. In the entire thirteen days I was there, I got two meals ... I have seen but one man get a bath in solitary confinement, in all the time that I have been there. That man had a bucket of cold water thrown over him.

— Young testifying as to his experiences in "The Hole" at Alcatraz during his 1941 trial.

The jury found Young, who had faced possible execution if convicted of first degree murder, guilty of a lesser charge of involuntary manslaughter. The judge described Young as a "cold-blooded murderer" before imposing the maximum sentence of three years on the lesser conviction.

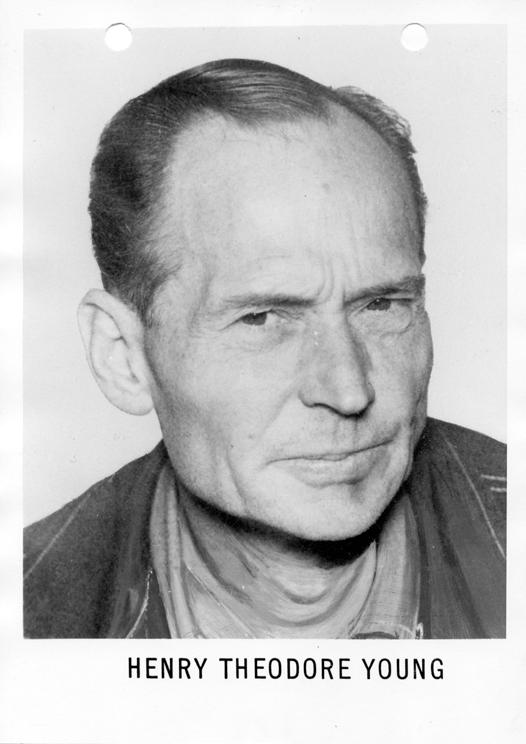
Henry Theodore Young FBI Most Wanted Poster from 1967

In 1954, Young was transferred to the Washington State Penitentiary at Walla Walla to begin a life sentence for the 1933 murder conviction. On September 21, 1967, Young was added as #258 of the FBI Ten Most Wanted Fugitives list for escaping the prison. He was arrested in Kansas City, Missouri on January 9, 1968, after a citizen recognized him from an article in Inside Detective magazine. He was released from Washington State Penitentiary in 1972, at age 61. He "jumped parole and, according to Washington State authorities, his whereabouts are unknown." No further records exist on Young.

== Inaccuracies within the film ==
The film Murder in the First (1995) has a number of inaccuracies compared to the facts of Young's life. It mistakenly presents Young as being arrested for stealing $5 in order to feed himself and his younger sister. It shows that he was tortured by officials after his escape attempt. It shows him killing McCain in the cafeteria immediately after his return to the general population, rather than later. It also showed that he was found dead in his prison cell in 1942, just before his appeal, with the word "victory" on the wall.

As noted above, Young had a prior murder conviction before arriving at Alcatraz. He was transferred from Alcatraz to serve the remainder of that murder sentence later in life at a Washington state prison. He disappeared after jumping parole after being released in 1972 from Walla Walla.

== See also ==
- List of fugitives from justice who disappeared
