= Escape from Alcatraz =

Escape from Alcatraz refers to events surrounding real or fictional escape attempts from the prison on Alcatraz Island in San Francisco Bay.

Escape from Alcatraz may also refer to:

== Events ==
- June 1962 Alcatraz escape, possibly the most famous escape attempt from the prison
- Escape from Alcatraz (triathlon), two triathlons held in the San Francisco Bay Area of California
- Battle of Alcatraz, the result of an unsuccessful escape attempt which lasted from May 2 to 4, 1946

== Media ==
- Escape from Alcatraz (book), 1963 non-fiction book by J. Campbell Bruce
- Escape from Alcatraz (film), 1979 film adaptation of the book, directed by Don Siegel and starring Clint Eastwood
- Alcatraz: Prison Escape, a 2001 computer video game
- Escape from Alcatraz (album), 2003 album by rapper Rasco

== See also ==
- Alcatraz (disambiguation)
- List of Alcatraz escape attempts
