= Alcatraz Island in popular culture =

Alcatraz Island has appeared many times in popular culture. Its appeal in film derives from its picturesque setting, natural beauty, isolation, and its history as a U.S. penitentiary (now a museum) – from which, officially, no prisoner ever successfully escaped.

== Prisoners ==
Most appearances of Alcatraz island in popular culture are related to its former status as a federal prison. Both real life and fictional accounts of imprisonment on the island have been popular.

One of the best-known of Alcatraz's historic inmates was Robert Stroud, known as "The Birdman of Alcatraz". His biography was written by Thomas E. Gaddis and then adapted into a film in 1962, with Burt Lancaster playing the lead role.

The 1995 film Murder in the First depicts a man who spends three years in solitary confinement at the prison. One of the prisoners, Kyle Oberholzer, was charged with rape, murder and fornicating.

== Portrayals in arts, media, and entertainment ==
=== Common fictional themes ===
==== Escape attempts ====
Many films and television series have exploited Alcatraz Island's reputation as a prison from which it was almost impossible to escape. For example:

- Brute Force (1947), starring Burt Lancaster, although inspired by actual events during the Battle of Alcatraz, is a highly fictionalized account of an attempted prison break. It was unusual at the time for the level of violence it portrayed.
- Birdman of Alcatraz (1962), starring Burt Lancaster, briefly depicts a largely fictional version of the battle which, from the start, is portrayed as a full-scale riot rather than a discrete escape attempt. Robert Stroud, the "Birdman of Alcatraz", is given unwarranted credit for ending the conflict.
- Don Siegel's thriller Escape from Alcatraz (1979) portrays both the conditions of life in the prison and the difficulty of escaping from it, and chronicles the story of Frank Morris and brothers John and Clarence Anglin, who escaped from Alcatraz in 1962.
- Alcatraz — The Whole Shocking Story (1980) is a factually based TV drama of the events of the Battle of Alcatraz, incorporated into a larger narrative of the history of Alcatraz as seen through the eyes of its youngest prisoner, Clarence Carnes.
- Six Against the Rock (1987), starring David Carradine as Bernard Coy, is based on the semi-fictional book by Clark Howard.
- Alcatraz (2018), is an independent film depicting the Battle of Alcatraz.

==== Hostages ====
Alcatraz has been used as a location for fictional hostage scenarios:

- Terrorists use Alcatraz as a hiding-place after taking the Mayor of San Francisco hostage in the third Dirty Harry film, The Enforcer (1976)
- In The Rock (1996), a group from the United States Marine Corps Force Reconnaissance holds 81 tourists hostage, demanding monetary reparations; to defeat the hostage-takers, the Navy SEAL team enlists the help of John Patrick Mason, who successfully escaped Alcatraz.

==== Safe haven ====
Alcatraz has also been portrayed often as a safe haven or base of operations in post-apocalyptic fiction, such as the film The Book of Eli (2010).

=== Portrayals ===
==== Multimedia franchises ====
- The Harry Potter franchise features a wizarding island prison called Azkaban, which is partly based on Alcatraz.

==== Films ====
- Al Capone (1959) ends with the once-powerful crime boss being attacked by other prisoners after being sent to "The Rock" for income-tax evasion.
- Alcatraz: The Whole Shocking Story (1980) stars Michael Beck as Clarence Carnes. The film was directed by Paul Krasny.
- In All Dogs Go to Heaven 2 (1996), Carface turns Alcatraz into the Devil's temple and a prison for angels.
- Birdman of Alcatraz (1962), starring Burt Lancaster and directed by John Frankenheimer, is based on Thomas E. Gaddis' eponymous 1955 biography of Robert Stroud.
- In Cats & Dogs: The Revenge of Kitty Galore (2010), Mr. Tinkles was locked up in a hidden prison on Alcatraz Island as a mental patient.
- Escape from Alcatraz (1979), starring Clint Eastwood and directed by Don Siegel.
- Half Past Dead (2002), starring Steven Seagal, is set at a modern Alcatraz.
- King of Alcatraz (1938), starring Gail Patrick and directed by Robert Florey.
- Murder in the First (1995), a drama film about a fictionalized inmate at Alcatraz.
- Occupation of Alcatraz 1969 is a documentary about the protest occupation of the then-defunct Alcatraz.
- Point Blank (1967) was the first major motion picture to be filmed on location at Alcatraz Island after the closure of the Federal prison in 1963.
- In the Popeye the Sailor animated cartoon "Private Eye Popeye" (1954), Popeye knocks a criminal into Alcatraz after gaining a fresh burst of strength from eating spinach.
- In So I Married An Axe Murderer, Charlie and his friend Tony take a tour of Alcatraz.
- Star Trek Into Darkness, a 2013 science-fiction movie, in which the facility is destroyed when Khan crashes his derelict starship into San Francisco.
- The Book of Eli (2010) is a post-apocalyptic film that ends on Alcatraz.
- The climax of The Enforcer (1976) involves a shoot-out on Alcatraz.
- The Rock (1996), with Sean Connery, Nicolas Cage, and Ed Harris, takes place at Alcatraz Island, featuring a rogue U.S. Marine Brigadier General and US Force Recon Marines who have taken over the island, stolen and are threatening to launch dangerous M55 rocket missiles filled with deadly VX gas, to eradicate large parts of San Francisco unless they are paid $100 million, forcing a government strike team to recruit John Mason (Connery), a former SAS operative and the only man to ever escape "the Rock", in order to break in and stop them.
- What's New, Scooby-Doo?: Scooby and the gang investigate Alcatraz prison in order to solve the mystery regarding San Franpsycho, the ghost of a former Alcatraz inmate.
- X-Men: The Last Stand features Alcatraz as the development center for a "cure" for mutants.
- The 1984 movie Electric Dreams features the two lead characters on a date going on a tour of the facility. Their tour depicted the isolation cells, the recreation yard, and parts of the island shore.

==== Games ====
- Alcatraz (video game), a 1992 sequel to the Infogrames game (the sequel to Hostages), involves US Navy SEALS infiltrating a terrorist-occupied Alcatraz and foil their plans.
- Alcatraz: Prison Escape (released worldwide on November 23, 2001), developed by Zombie Studios and published by Activision Value, is a computer game based on, but not directly referencing, some famous escapes from the prison facility.
- In Call of Duty: Black Ops II, DLC "Uprising", a zombies map titled "Mob of the Dead" takes place in a twisted, nightmarish version of Alcatraz Island, inhabited by zombies; however, it is not the real Alcatraz; it is more like a purgatory for the four characters.
- In the Call of Duty: Black Ops III final zombie map, "Revelations", Alcatraz Island makes a cameo appearance.
- In Call of Duty: Black Ops 4 (2018), Alcatraz is the setting for the zombies map "Blood of the Dead".
- In Call of Duty: Mobile, Alcatraz is a Battle Royale map first introduced in 2020 as part of the first anniversary event.
- In Call of Duty: Warzone (2020), Alcatraz is a Battle Royale map, under the name "Rebirth Island".
- In Cause of Death, Alcatraz island appears in the last chapters of the first and fifth volumes.
- In the RTS video game Command & Conquer: Yuri's Revenge, Alcatraz is featured in the introduction video setting up for its single-player campaign. The villain, Yuri, former leader of Soviet Psychic Crops, had built a Psychic Dominator and power plant on Alcatraz Island, as part of his global mind-controlling device network. The Allied Harriers launched an air strike but failed. In the campaign, the player as commander must destroy the Psychic Dominator with the time shift by The Time Machine.
- Destroy All Humans! 2 (2006) and its 2022 remake, where-in a fictional version of San Francisco (known as Bay City in-game), a fictional version of Alcatraz is used as a base for enemy Soviet agents, and it is referenced as simply "The Rock". The player is given a mission to destroy it.
- Escape from Alcatraz (2017) is a real time escape room game from EscapeSF in San Francisco, that replicates the environment with using original props and background electronics.
- Far Cry New Dawn features an expedition to Alcatraz following a nuclear apocalypse. Players explore the island to recover a package.
- In Half-Life 2, the Combine prison Nova Prospekt is heavily based on Alcatraz.
- In Homefront, during the mission on the Golden Gate Bridge, it is mentioned that US Navy SEAL Team Six has taken control of Alcatraz; it can also be seen in the distance.
- In Hulk, there are two chapters (five levels) that take place in Alcatraz.
- In the arcade game rail shooter L.A. Machineguns: Rage of the Machines, a maximum security prison is established on Alcatraz Island in the year 2025, which falls under attack to the titular Rage of the Machines, a robotic terrorist force that attempts to free a number of convicts in the process. The player is tasked in thwarting the robots' assault, before taking on their leader, a larger amphibious robot named Xenophobia.
- The Albatross Island Prison in Lego City Undercover is based on Alcatraz Island.
- In Manhunter 2: San Francisco, the player visits alien-occupied Alcatraz near the end of the game and frees captive mutants from the alien Orbs.
- In Mean Streets, Tex Murphy visits Alcatraz at the end of the game, which houses the huge "Overlord" computer and then proceed to activate its self-destruct sequence.
- In Operation 7, an online free to play first person shooter managed by Netgame, Alcatraz is a playable map for the demolition or survival modes. It features a realistic map based on the cell blocks, cafeteria, and basement of the prison.
- The game RollerCoaster Tycoon 2 has a scenario setting on the island, some time after the prison was closed down and abandoned.
- The game RuneScape sends the player to an "escape-proof" island known as The Rock.
- Alcatraz also appears in Rush 2: Extreme Racing USA again using the same layout as San Francisco Rush: The Rock.
- In the video game San Francisco Rush: The Rock, Alcatraz is the main setting. Players race cars on, above, and through the prison and the island.
- In the Ghostlight video game Shadow Hearts: From the New World (developed in 2005), the party travels to Alcatraz to bust out Al Capone, who was formerly a real-life prisoner of the island.
- In the simulation game SimCity 3000, players can build Alcatraz Complex as their city's landmark.
- Sim City 4 (released in January 2003) used Alcatraz as an historical building. It was developed by Maxis and published by Electronic Arts.
- In the game Tom Clancy's Rainbow Six 3, several hostages must be rescued from Alcatraz Prison.
- In the video game, Tony Hawk's Pro Skater 4 (2002), the island is featured as a playable level and has many features of the real Alcatraz.
- The video game Urban Strike features Alcatraz as one of the secret bases of main antagonist H. R. Malone.
- In the video game Watch Dogs 2, the player can walk around and visit Alcatraz Island.

==== Literature ====
===== Fiction =====
- Al Capone Does My Shirts and its sequels are historical fiction young adult novels by Gennifer Choldenko, about a boy and his autistic sister living on Alcatraz Island
- In Baccano!, the hitman Ladd Russo is imprisoned in 1932 and subsequently transferred to Alcatraz in 1934. The story arc "Alice in Jails" focuses on this and other inmates of Alcatraz prison.
- In The Battle of the Labyrinth, the fourth Percy Jackson book, a Labyrinth entrance is located in one of the cells on Alcatraz Island and the worst nightmare of the Cyclopes, Kampê, is a prison guard at Alcatraz.
- In an issue of Psi-Force, the group takes a sightseeing tour to Alcatraz and winds up getting attacked and temporarily imprisoned there.
- The Secrets of the Immortal Nicholas Flamel fantasy novels series by Michael Scott features Alcatraz in, for example, The Alchemyst: The Secrets of the Immortal Nicholas Flamel (2007), The Magician (2008) - in which Alcatraz is depicted as a prison for the immortal Perenelle Flamel, and The Sorceress: The Secrets of the Immortal Nicholas Flamel (2009)
- After the mass depowerment of the mutant race, the superhero team the X-Men move to Alcatraz and make it a safe haven for all mutants, renaming it Utopia.

===== Memoirs =====
A number of books were written or co-authored by former Alcatraz prisoners, e.g.:

- Alcatraz: The True End of the Line, an autobiography by former inmate Darwin Coon
- Alcatraz from Inside and Alcatraz from Inside: The Hard Years, 1942–1952, by former inmate Jim Quillen
- From Alcatraz to the White House: An Autobiography, by former inmate Nathan Glenn Williams
- On the Rock: Twenty-five years in Alcatraz: The prison story of Alvin Karpis as told to Robert Livesey, coauthored by Alvin Karpis, the longest-held prisoner at Alcatraz
- Public Enemy No. 1: The Alvin Karpis Story, coauthored by Alvin Karpis
- The Birdman of Alcatraz (1955), Thomas E. Gaddis' 1955 biography of Robert Stroud, which was adapted as an eponymous 1962 film

===== Other non-fiction books about Alcatraz =====
- Escape from Alcatraz (1963), by J. Campbell Bruce
- Last Guard Out: A Riveting Account by the Last Guard to Leave Alcatraz (2008), ISBN 1434350770), by Jim Albright

==== Music ====
===== Groups =====
- Alkatraz, a Welsh rock band including former members of Quicksand
- Alcatrazz, a former American Heavy Metal band (1983–1987), notable for launching the careers of famed guitarists Steve Vai and Yngwie Malmsteen; "Island in the Sun" (1983), the band's debut single, makes multiple lyrical references to Alcatraz Island
- Alkatrazz, a former British heavy metal band (1981–1983)

===== Albums =====
- The Rock (1975) is an album by Scottish singer Frankie Miller
- The Rock: Pressure Makes Diamonds (2006) is an album by the rapper San Quinn

===== Songs =====
- "17 Hills", by Thomas Dolby, from A Map of the Floating City (2011), narrates an ambiguously successful escape from Alcatraz
- "Alcatraz", by Benn hints at the Call of Duty map "Mob of the Dead"
- "Alcatraz", by the indie rock band Carbon Leaf, is a song on their 2013 album Constellation Prize (2013)
- "Alcatraz" is a song performed by June Carter Cash
- "Alcatraz" is a song written by Leon Russell covered by Nazareth on the album Razamanaz
- "Alcatraz (Pelican Island)" is a song performed by Malvina Reynolds
- "The Rock" is a song performed by Scottish singer Frankie Miller, on an album of the same name
- "Birdman of Alcatraz" is a song on Rick Wakeman's Criminal Record
- Norteño band Los Tigres Del Norte filmed the music video of "Jefe De Jefes" at the Alcatraz prison
- "Frank Morris", by the Christian rock band Capital Lights, tells the story of the escape attempt from the point of view of the prisoners
- The German rock band, Scorpions filmed the music video of "No One Like You" at the Alcatraz prison

==== People ====
- Al Katrazz (born 1971), ringname of wrestler Brian Fleming

==== Television ====
===== Television series =====
- Alcatraz (2012), the short-lived TV series on Fox, starring Sam Neill, Jorge Garcia, Parminder Nagra, and Sarah Jones, and produced by J. J. Abrams, involves prisoners from Alcatraz - which was not closed due to budget reasons, but because all 302 residents mysteriously disappeared on March 20, 1963 - reappearing in the present day, requiring a makeshift task force to track down the inmates and prevent them from committing further crimes while also determining the reasons for their return
- In Altered Carbon, Alcatraz serves as a maximum-security facility where prisoners' consciousnesses are digitally confined, resembling the stack technology used in the series.

===== Television episodes =====
- In a two-part episode of Avatar: The Last Airbender there is a Fire Nation prison for war criminals similar to Alcatraz called "The Boiling Rock", situated on an island in a boiling lake. Until two characters, Sokka and Zuko, infiltrate the prison and rescue the former's captured father and girlfriend, nobody had ever successfully escaped from it.
- In Charmed episode 1.20, "The Power of Two", Prudence Halliwell and her sister Phoebe Halliwell vanquish the evil ghost of a serial killer who was jailed in the Alcatraz prison and is seeking revenge on his judge and jury. The sisters must figure out how to vanquish this evil spirit and prevent his killing again without the Power of Three, as their sister Piper is vacationing in Hawaii
- Ghost Adventures filmed season 8, episode 8 of paranormal ongoings at Alcatraz, on Travel Channel, titled "Ghost Adventures" (October 11, 2013)
- Ghost Hunters's 100th episode; season 6 episode 1 - "Alcatraz" (March 3, 2010), is a 2 hour premier special featuring a paranormal investigation at Alcatraz
- Ghost Lab, Discovery Channel's paranormal show, did an investigation of the prison in Season 1, episode 10: "Alcatraz" (December 8, 2009)
- The G.I. Joe animated series aired a two-part episode titled "D-Day at Alcatraz" (1990).
- Alcatraz appears in the first episodes of the second season to the animated prequel series of Gremlins, where Gizmo and his friends end up on the island controlled by a supernatural force that causes anyone who dies there to reanimate as undead zombies.
- Alcatraz appears in the Mummies Alive! episode, "Bird Mummy of Alcatraz".
- MythBusters aired "Alcatraz Escape" (December 12, 2003) on the Discovery Channel.
- In the Phineas and Ferb episode, "Phineas and Ferb Get Busted!", the Smile Away Reformatory School is based on Alcatraz.
- In the Scooby-Doo and Scrappy-Doo (1979 TV series), the gang visits Alcatraz Island.
- The Fairly OddParents features a prison in Fairy World called Abracatraz, based on Alcatraz.
- In The Mighty B! episode, "Tour D'Alcatraz", Bessie and Penny are mistaken by an officer as criminals while on a tour in Alcatraz.
- The Othersiders series finale featured an investigation of Alcatraz Prison.
- In season 3, episode 6 of the HBO show Silicon Valley, titled "Bachmanity Insanity", Erlich Bachman throws a Hawaiian-themed party at Alcatraz to launch 'Bachmanity'.
- In The Simpsons episode, "Bart-Mangled Banner", after the Simpsons get ostracized due to a misunderstanding, they get arrested and locked up in Alcatraz, along with people like Michael Moore and Bill Clinton.
- In The Wild Wild West episode "The Night of the Pelican", Secret Service agent James West goes undercover as a prisoner in Alcatraz.
