= Alcatraz (disambiguation) =

Alcatraz is an island in San Francisco Bay, California, US.

Alcatraz may also refer to:

== Places ==
- Alcatraz Federal Penitentiary, a former maximum-security Federal prison on Alcatraz Island, US
- Fort Alcatraz, a military post on Alcatraz Island, US
- Alcatraz Island Lighthouse, on Alcatraz Island, US
- Alligator Alcatraz, the informal name for an immigration detention facility in Florida, US
- Alcatraz, Cape Verde, a village on the island of Maio

== Arts, entertainment and media ==
=== Fictional characters ===
- Alcatraz, the main character in the 2011 videogame Crysis 2 by Crytek
- Alcatraz Smedry, the main character of five juvenile fiction novels by Brandon Sanderson

=== Games ===
- Alcatraz (video game), a 1992 sequel to the Infogrames game, Hostages
- Alcatraz coup, an illegal bridge (card game) manoeuvre
- Alcatraz: Prison Escape, a 2001 computer video game

=== Music ===
- Alcatraz (album), by the Mr. T Experience
- Alcatraz, a Welsh rock band formed by members of Quicksand (Welsh band)
- Alcatrazz, an American heavy metal band 1983–1987
- Alkatrazz, a British heavy metal band 1981–1983

=== Film and television ===
- Alcatraz Island (film), a 1937 Warner Bros. film
- Alcatraz (TV series), a 2012 Fox television series

== Other uses ==
- Battle of Alcatraz (1946), the result of an unsuccessful escape attempt at Alcatraz Federal Penitentiary
- Al Katrazz (born 1971), ringname of wrestler Brian Fleming
- Alcatraz Battalion, a Ukrainian military unit comprising former prisoners

== See also ==
- Bothrops alcatraz (Alcatrazes lancehead), a species of snake in the family Viperidae
- Ololygon alcatraz (Alcatraz snouted Treefrog), a species of frog in the family Hylidae
- Alcatraz East, crime museum in Pigeon Forge, Tennessee, US
- Little Alcatraz, a small rock off the northwest coast of Alcatraz Island, US
- June 1962 Alcatraz escape attempt, at Alcatraz Federal Penitentiary
- Occupation of Alcatraz (November 20, 1969 to June 11, 1971), an occupation of Alcatraz Island by 89 American Indians and supporters
- Alcaraz (disambiguation)
