= Escape from Alcatraz (film) =

1979 film by Don Siegel

- Theatrical release poster by Bill Gold
- Directed by: Don Siegel
- Screenplay by: Richard Tuggle
- Based on: Escape from Alcatraz (1963 book) by J. Campbell Bruce
- Produced by: Don Siegel
- Starring: Clint Eastwood; Patrick McGoohan
- Cinematography: Bruce Surtees
- Edited by: Ferris Webster
- Music by: Jerry Fielding
- Production company: The Malpaso Company
- Distributed by: Paramount Pictures
- Release date: June 22, 1979
- Running time: 112 minutes
- Country: United States
- Language: English
- Budget: $8 million
- Box office: $43 million (domestic)

Escape from Alcatraz is a 1979 American prison thriller film directed and produced by Don Siegel that depicts the June 1962 prisoner escape from the federal penitentiary on Alcatraz Island. The screenplay, written by Richard Tuggle, is based on the 1963 non-fiction book by J. Campbell Bruce, and it stars Clint Eastwood as escape ringleader Frank Lee Morris, alongside Patrick McGoohan, Fred Ward, Jack Thibeau, and Larry Hankin, with Danny Glover appearing in his film debut.

Shot on location at Alcatraz, the film marks the fifth and final collaboration between Siegel and Eastwood, following Coogan's Bluff (1968), Two Mules for Sister Sara (1970), The Beguiled (1971), and Dirty Harry (1971).

Released by Paramount Pictures on June 22, 1979, Escape from Alcatraz received critical acclaim from audiences and critics and was a financial success, becoming one of the highest-grossing films of 1979.

== Plot ==
On January 18, 1960, Frank Lee Morris, a burglar and escape artist, is transferred to the maximum security prison on Alcatraz Island. In the dining hall, Morris makes the acquaintance of the eccentric Litmus, who is fond of desserts. Morris is sent to meet the prison's warden, who curtly informs him, "no one has ever escaped from Alcatraz and no one ever will". The warden fails to notice Morris steal a nail clipper from his desk.

Morris also makes acquaintances with English, a black inmate serving two life sentences for killing two white men in self-defense, and the elderly Doc, who paints portraits and once grew chrysanthemums at Alcatraz; Doc's portraits contain chrysanthemums as a symbol of human spirit and freedom. Morris also makes an enemy of Wolf, a rapist whom he beats in the showers when he tries to harass him. Wolf later attacks him in the prison yard with a knife; both men are subsequently imprisoned in solitary confinement. Morris is later released.

As Morris comes to know inmate Charley Butts, his new cellmate, the warden discovers that Doc has painted a portrait of him, as well as other guards. The guards' paintings are flattering, recognizing their humanity, but the warden's painting, which has been kept out of view, captures what Doc sees as the ugliness of his cruel nature. Enraged, the warden strips Doc of his privileges. A saddened Doc, in the prison workshop, cuts off his fingers with a hatchet and is led away. Morris finds that Doc gave a gift of one of the blossom heads in his pocket.

After Morris finds that bank-robbing brothers John and Clarence Anglin, old friends from another prison sentence, are at Alcatraz, Morris notices that the concrete around the grille in his cell is weak and can be chipped away; he masterminds an escape plan, with Butts and the Anglins, to build dummy heads and construct a raft to head to Angel Island. Over the next months, Morris, the Anglins, and Butts dig through the walls of their cells with spoons (having soldered them with heat to form makeshift shovels), fashion dummies out of papier-mâché and human hair to plant in their beds and construct a raft from raincoats.

After they plan to leave the night of Tuesday, June 12, 1962, Morris places the chrysanthemum in the dining hall in honor of Doc, but the Warden stops by and crushes it, causing a provoked Litmus to suffer a fatal heart attack; the warden taunts Morris that "some men are destined never to leave Alcatraz…alive". Morris shares a farewell handshake with English. Although a search of Morris' cell turns up nothing during a routine contraband search, the suspicious warden suggests for him to be transferred to a different cell on the morning of June 12.

On June 11, Monday, Wolf is released from solitary confinement and threatens Morris; Morris makes the decision to leave that night. Although Wolf prepares to attack Morris again, English intercepts him by threatening Wolf with his own gang. That night, the four inmates plan to meet in the passageway, but Butts loses his nerve and fails to meet with them, forcing Morris and the Anglins to go on without him. Carrying the flotation gear, Morris and the Anglins access the roof and avoid the searchlights. Butts gains his nerve, but is unable to reach the shaft, eventually returning to his cell in despair. Morris and the Anglins scramble down the side of the building into the prison yard, climb over a barbed-wire fence, make their way to the shoreline of the island, and inflate the raft. The three men escape from Alcatraz, partially submerged in the water, clinging to the raft and using their legs to propel themselves, vanishing into the night.

The next morning, a guard, intending to move Morris to his new cell, discovers the dummy head, and sounds the alarm, as English smiles happily. Joining a search party on Angel Island, the warden learns that shreds of raincoat material and personal effects of the men were found floating in the bay. He stubbornly insists that the men's personal effects were important, and the men would have drowned before losing them, though a sergeant taunts him that the men might have "lost it to look like they drowned". The warden finds a chrysanthemum flower head on a rock, as he is told by an aide that he has been recalled to Washington to face his superiors, with the prospect of being forced to accept an early retirement for having failed to prevent the breakout from happening. After being told that no chrysanthemums grow on Angel Island, the warden insists the men drowned, crushes the flower, and throws it into the water.

A closing title card states that no bodies were found and Alcatraz closed less than a year later; the final shot is of Morris' dummy head laying on the floor, seemingly grinning.

== Cast ==
- Clint Eastwood as Frank Lee Morris
- Patrick McGoohan as the Warden
- Fred Ward as John Anglin
- Jack Thibeau as Clarence Anglin
- Larry Hankin as Charley Butts (based on Allen West)
- Roberts Blossom as Chester "Doc" Dalton
- Paul Benjamin as English
- Bruce M. Fischer as Wolf
- Frank Ronzio as Litmus
- Fred Stuthman as Johnson
- David Cryer as Wagner
- Hank Brandt as Associate Warden
- Garry Goodrow as Weston
- Regina Baff as Lucy
- Danny Glover as inmate
- Carl Lumbly as inmate

== Production ==
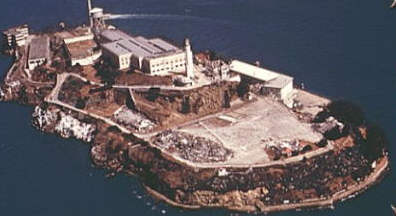
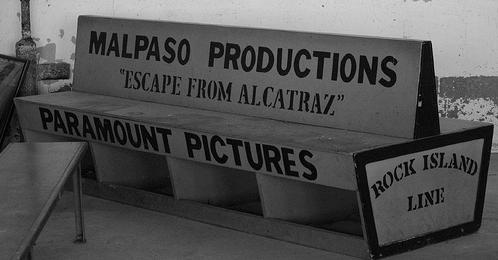
Left: Alcatraz. Right: A Malpaso-Paramount production bench used during the filming

Screenwriter Richard Tuggle had visited Alcatraz as a tourist and was intrigued with the June 1962 escape. When Tuggle was laid off from his job in health publishing, he used the opportunity to pursue a screen adaptation and contacted J. Campbell Bruce, author of the 1963 book of the same name. After reaching an agreement with Bruce, Tuggle was able to obtain permission from the publisher, McGraw-Hill.

Skeptical that a fledgling screenwriter could realize the project, McGraw-Hill simply relinquished film rights in a letter. While researching the escape, Tuggle had access to newly released FBI records about the case. Tuggle spent six months researching and writing a screenplay based on Bruce's book. He went to the Writers Guild and received a list of literary agents who would accept unsolicited manuscripts. He submitted a copy to each, and also to anybody else in the business that he could cajole into reading it.

Everyone rejected it, saying it had poor dialogue and characters and lacked a love interest, and that the public was not interested in prison stories. Tuggle decided to bypass producers and executives and deal directly with filmmakers. On advice from Bruce, Tuggle called the agent for director Don Siegel and lied, saying he had met Siegel at a party and the director had expressed interest in reading his script. The agent forwarded the script to Siegel, who read it, liked it, and passed it on to Clint Eastwood. Siegel had previously indicated interest in the book and had written a treatment titled The Rock in 1966. Siegel was impressed with Tuggle's script and purchased it for $100,000. Siegel submitted the property to Paramount Pictures Corp., where it was swiftly approved for production. Its budget was $8 million.

Tuggle considered, "Alcatraz is a character, a big character [...] you root for these guys to conquer it. It’s like climbing Mount Everest." Tuggle created the character of English, and inspired by some scenes by various prison films, including The Great Escape. He initially had Morris describe his childhood in full to Butts, but shortened the dialogue. Some scenes from the script were omitted, including a scene that took place over Christmas, where Morris is in his cell alone, has a gumball, and as he opens the wrapper, it falls on the floor and rolls out under the cell bar. He reaches under and by inches fails to reach it.

Tuggle struggled to come up with an ending due to the uncertain fate of the actual three escapees. He ultimately learned that flowers grow on Alcatraz, whereupon he created the character of Doc into a painter who paints flowers as a symbol of freedom and who gives one to Morris. Ferris Webster, the film editor, and Don Siegel did a first cut of the movie and made a temporary decision to end the film on the guard's discovery of Morris' dummy head. According to Tuggle, Eastwood was upset and said he wanted the ending that was in the screenplay, of the warden finding a chrysanthemum on Angel Island, though whether the placement of the chrysanthemum suggests the prisoners' survival or death is left unclear.

Eastwood was drawn to the role as ringleader Frank Morris and agreed to star, provided Siegel would direct under the Malpaso banner. Siegel insisted that it be a Don Siegel film and outmaneuvered Eastwood by purchasing the rights to the film for $100,000. This created a rift between the two friends. Although Siegel eventually agreed for it to be a Malpaso-Siegel production, Siegel went to Paramount Pictures, a rival studio, and never directed an Eastwood picture again.

Although Alcatraz had its own power plant, it was no longer functional, and 15 miles of cable were required to connect the island to San Francisco's electricity. As Siegel and Tuggle worked on the script, the producers paid $500,000 to restore the decaying prison and recreate the cold atmosphere; some interiors had to be recreated in the studio. Many of the improvements were kept intact after the film was made. To avoid potential interruptions by tour groups, most of the interiors were shot at night.

== Themes ==
Religious historian Adele Reinhartz found that as the film leaves Morris' fate uncertain, he comes across as a Christ-like figure.

== Historical accuracy ==
The opening text of Morris' arrival at Alcatraz is given as January 18, 1960. In real life, Morris was sent to Alcatraz on January 14. The conversation between Morris and the warden, notably when Morris is asked on whether he has any family, is an amalgamation of a conversation Morris was given by a classification parole officer and the associate warden. Litmus telling Morris about the shaft on top on the roof in the prison yard and teasing him "ask the bull for the key" is based on a reported conversation Morris had with a fellow prisoner in the brush shop.

The warden is a fictional character created to avoid potential legal action. The film is set between the arrival of Morris at Alcatraz in January 1960 and his escape in June 1962; the warden remains in office over the course of the entire movie. In reality, Warden Madigan had been replaced by Blackwell in 1961. Blackwell served as warden of Alcatraz at its most difficult time from 1961 to 1963, when it was facing closure as a decaying prison and financing problems, and at the time of the June 1962 escape. Blackwell was on vacation in Napa County, California at the time of the escape. Blackwell appointed prison administrator Arthur Dollison to the role of Acting Warden in his absence. The film's Warden mentions his predecessors Johnston (1934–48) and (incorrectly) Blackwell (1961–63).

The incident in which Doc chops off his fingers with a hatchet was based on an actual incident in 1937; inmate Rufe Persful, maddened by strict rules that imposed silence on the prisoners, cut off four fingers with a hatchet to try to get transferred off Alcatraz.

Accounts in real life differ as to who masterminded the escape. Allen West, the fourth inmate who tried to participate in the real escape, but was left behind when he failed to remove his ventilator grille on the night of the escape, is fictionalized as "Charley Butts". Butts, who is a newcomer, is portrayed as little more than a barely competent follower, and not very bright, as shown when Litmus introduces himself as Al Capone. In real life, West had been in Alcatraz since 1957 and was known for having an aggressive reputation for violence and repeated escapes. West claimed that the escape was his idea. The film reinforces the idea that Morris was the mastermind.

The symbol of the chrysanthemum is a fictional invention of the film, as is the final scene where the warden finds a chrysanthemum on Angel Island after the escape, that may or may not indicate the prisoners' survival.

== Reception ==
=== Critical response ===
Escape from Alcatraz was well received by critics and is considered by many as one of the best films of 1979. Frank Rich of Time described the film as "cool, cinematic grace", while Stanley Kauffmann of The New Republic called it "crystalline cinema". Vincent Canby of The New York Times called it "a first-rate action movie", noting that "Mr. Eastwood fulfills the demands of the role and of the film as probably no other actor could. Is it acting? I don't know, but he's the towering figure in its landscape." Variety called it "one of the finest prison films ever made."

Roger Ebert gave the film 3.5 stars out of 4, writing, "For almost all of its length, 'Escape from Alcatraz' is a taut and toughly wrought portrait of life in a prison. It is also a masterful piece of storytelling, in which the characters say little and the camera explains the action", but commented that the ending is not superb. Gene Siskel of the Chicago Tribune awarded 3 stars out of 4, calling it "very entertaining and well made. The principal problem is a too-quick ending that catches us by surprise." Kevin Thomas of the Los Angeles Times wrote, "A delight for cineastes, 'Escape From Alcatraz' could serve as a textbook example in breathtakingly economical, swift and stylish screen storytelling."

Review aggregation website Rotten Tomatoes retrospectively reported that 97% of 31 critics gave the film a positive review, with an average rating of 7.1/10. The site's critics consensus reads, "Escape from Alcatraz makes brilliant use of the tense claustrophobia of its infamous setting -- as well as its leading man's legendarily flinty resolve." On Metacritic, the film has a weighted average score of 76 out of 100 based on nine critics, indicating "generally favorable" reviews.

=== Box office ===
The film grossed $5.3 million in the U.S. during its opening weekend from June 24, 1979, shown on 815 screens. In total, the film grossed an estimated $43 million in the U.S. and Canada, making it the 15th domestic highest-grossing picture of 1979.

== Legacy ==
In 2001, the American Film Institute nominated this film for AFI's 100 Years...100 Thrills.

Quentin Tarantino called it "both fascinating and exhilarating... cinematically speaking, it's Siegel's most expressive film. "

The film received renewed cultural interest in 2025 after the film aired on PBS hours before President Donald Trump announced his intention to reopen Alcatraz, leading many to believe that his decision was inspired by the film.

== See also ==
- Alcatraz: The Whole Shocking Story (1980 television film)
- Six Against the Rock (1987)
- Alcatraz Island in popular culture
- Survival film, about the film genre, with a list of related films
- The Shawshank Redemption (1994)
