= Alcaraz =

Alcaraz may refer to:

- Alcaraz (surname), includes a list of people with the name
- Sierra de Alcaraz, mountain range in southeast Spain
  - Alcaraz, Spain, municipality in southeast Spain
  - Alcaraz rug, Spanish rug design
- Villa Alcaraz, village and municipality in Entre Ríos Province in northeastern Argentina

== See also ==
- Alcatraz (disambiguation)
