= Richard J. Williard =

American prison warden

- Born: Richard James Williard; July 25, 1911; Oakland, California
- Died: September 23, 2006 (aged 95); Concord, California
- Occupation: Federal Bureau of Prisons administrator
- Known for: Associate Warden, Alcatraz Federal Penitentiary (1962–63)

Richard James Williard (July 25, 1911 – September 23, 2006) was an American prison administrator.

== Biography ==
He was born to Samuel A. Williard and Adah Nordlund in Oakland, California, 1911.

Williard began work for the Federal Bureau of Prisons around 1938. During the course of his career, he served as Captain of the Guards at both McNeil Island and Atlanta Penitentiaries, as well as Associate Warden at the Federal Correctional Institution, Terminal Island. He was the last Associate Warden of Alcatraz Federal Penitentiary under Olin G. Blackwell, replacing Arthur M. Dollison in December, 1962 and staying until the institution closed on March 21, 1963.

Following the closure of the penitentiary, he had served as a caretaker of the island. While a caretaker, he had dealt with a brief invasion of Sioux Indians in March 1964. In October 1964, Williard took a position as Warden of the Oregon State Correctional Institution, a position he held until he resigned in 1967.

He died September 23, 2006, in Concord, California.
