= Dollison =

Dollison is a surname. Notable people with the surname include:

- Arthur M. Dollison (1909–1983), American prison administrator
- Nani Dollison (born 1953), American poker player

== See also ==
- Cash McCall (musician), born Maurice Dollison Jr.
