= Paul Pry =

Paul Pry may refer to:

- Paul Pry (play), 1825 English play
- Paul Pry (newspaper), published 1831–1836 by Anne Royall
- The Adventures of Paul Pry, nine stories by author Erle Stanley Gardner
- Paul Pry, pseudonym of artist William Heath
- Paul Pry Rock, now Little Alcatraz, a rock in the San Francisco Bay
