= Theodore Cole and Ralph Roe =

American prisoners, who disappeared during an escape attempt from Alcatraz

Theodore Cole
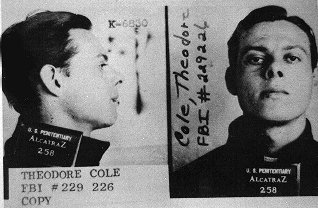
- Born: April 6, 1912; Pittsburg, Kansas
- Disappeared: December 16, 1937 (aged 25); San Francisco, California
- Status: Unknown, escaped/missing

Ralph Roe
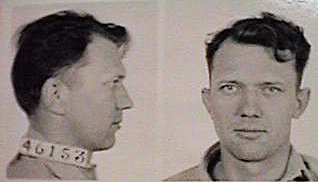
- Born: February 5, 1906
- Disappeared: December 16, 1937 (aged 31); San Francisco, California
- Status: Unknown, escaped/missing

Theodore Cole (born April 6, 1912 – disappeared December 17, 1937) and Ralph Roe (born February 5, 1906 – disappeared December 17, 1937) were Oklahoma bank robbers who took part in the second escape attempt from Alcatraz in 1937. They departed the island by jumping into the San Francisco Bay to an uncertain fate. Although officials were quick to conclude they likely drowned in the frigid waters, the fact the inmates got off Alcatraz and their bodies were never found, made the incident the first to challenge Alcatraz's reputation as an "escape-proof" prison.

== Imprisonment ==
Cole and Roe, both convicted bank robbers in Oklahoma, had been caught during earlier, independent escape attempts from that state's McAlester Prison. Roe was serving 99 years for bank robberies, and once escaped from McAlester by riding out on a truck hidden in a crate. Cole was a murderer at seventeen, saved from execution by his mother's eloquent appeal. He later killed a cellmate at McAlester, then managed an escape in a laundry bag. Picked up on a federal kidnap rap and awaiting trial, he fled the county jail in a garbage can. He was recaptured but continued to saw cell bars and on trips to court, to wriggle out of leg irons. As escape risks, they were both incarcerated in high-security Leavenworth Prison, then transferred to higher-security Alcatraz in 1936. When Cole arrived at Alcatraz, he reportedly said, "Don't think I like it here. Doubt I'll stay long". They were given jobs working in the prison's mat shop, a facility at the northernmost point of the island, where discarded automobile tires were cut up and converted into rubber mats for the U.S. Navy.

Roe was originally captured after a shootout with local police and FBI agents in Shawnee on December 30, 1933, which claimed the life of Roe's partner, Wilbur Underhill Jr. Cole had been given a death sentence for his role in the robbery of a bottling works plant in Tulsa. However, that was reduced to 15 years on appeal.

== Escape and disappearance ==
On December 16, 1937, a dense fog swept through the San Francisco Bay, impeding marine traffic and reducing visibility to near zero on Alcatraz Island. Cole and Roe were working in the mat shop. A routine headcount at 1:00 p.m. showed all prisoners accounted for. At the next count, at 1:30 p.m., the two men were gone. Two iron bars and three heavy glass panes of a window in the shop had a hole 8 3/4 inches (22 cm) high and 18 inches (46 cm) long. Once through the window, they slipped down to the gate of a high wire fence, concealed by the fog. With a wrench taken from the tire shop, they forced the gate lock and dropped twenty feet to a beach. Their trail vanished at that point.

An exhaustive search of the island revealed nothing; guards found only the abandoned wrench, tossed aside on the cliff edge. An extensive, multi-day search ensued; portions of the island were flooded with tear gas in an attempt to flush out the escapees, with no result. Throughout the afternoon and night, convicts celebrated Cole and Roe's escape in the cell house. Subsequent investigation revealed that Cole and Roe had prepared for the escape well in advance, using a hacksaw blade to weaken the window bars, and disguising the damage with a mixture of grease and shoe polish. At the beach, the men presumably entered the water, relying on floats improvised from tires or fuel canisters. There was no evidence to suggest they had constructed or launched a raft.

Prison officials concluded that Cole and Roe likely drowned during their escape. The swift ebb tides at the time, estimated at 7–9 knots, would have swept even an expert swimmer out of the bay and into the Pacific Ocean. The fog was so thick that it would have made it almost impossible for outside confederates to pick them up by boat; the men would not know if they were even swimming toward shore and would have found themselves being swept out to sea before they had expended sufficient energy to reach shore in still water. As it was late December, the water would have been very cold, ranging from 46 to 58 degrees Fahrenheit (7.8 °C to 14.4 °C). Warden Johnston said "...The water is too cold, the tide running too high, and land is too far."

As their bodies were never found, police departments in the surrounding counties and the FBI followed up every tip and rumor on Cole and Roe. There were various reports of sightings, though their validity is unknown; two hitchhikers claimed to have seen Roe and Cole, and identified them to police by their photos. A 1941 San Francisco Chronicle report declared that the pair were living in South America, and a cab driver in Cole's hometown of Seminole, Oklahoma, told police he had been shot by men he recognized as the two escapees.

The Seminole Producer reported on June 7, 1939:

Ted Cole, former Seminole youth, who escaped from Alcatraz prison with Ralph Roe in 1937 today was sought here by federal agents, more than 18 months after prison officials said they believed he had drowned in San Francisco Bay.

The G-men here maintained their customary silence, but one Seminole man who had known both Cole and Roe at Leavenworth penitentiary said that he and other local residents had been questioned about the fugitives.

Sandy Hood, in charge of Federal Bureau of Investigation operations in the sector, and Officer Smith of the G-men were in this area presumably working on the case with local officers.

Oklahoma officers seemed to intentionally make no effort to identify the escapees as they continued their hijacking spree in the Seminole, Tecumseh and Shawnee, Oklahoma area. The Seminole Producer reported on June 24, 1939:

(Seminole) Police Chief Jake Sims and the highway patrol that have linked Ralph Roe, Alcatraz fugitive to a Tecumseh hijacking, are taking their time, a check of the hijacking victims showed today.

At Oklahoma City, Mrs. Lois Daniels reported this noon that neither she nor her daughter, Mrs. E.J. Well, had been asked to identify photographs of Roe. Mrs. Daniels saved $1,150 worth of rings by tossing them into the weeds while the hijacker took a $1,000 ring from Mrs. Well.

Ed Talley of Oklahoma City who lost two $20 bills to the hijackers ($40 in total) also said that he had not been asked to identify the pictures of Roe.

== See also ==
- List of fugitives from justice who disappeared
- List of Alcatraz escape attempts
- Battle of Alcatraz
- June 1962 Alcatraz escape attempt
- John Paul Scott, only Alcatraz escapee known to have reached the San Francisco shore by swimming, 25 years to the day after Roe and Cole vanished

== External sources ==
- Bruce, J. Campbell (2005). Escape from Alcatraz. Berkeley, California: Ten Speed Press. ISBN 1-58008-678-0.
- Ward, David; Kassebaum, Gene G. (2009). Alcatraz: The Gangster Years. Berkeley and Los Angeles: University of California Press. ISBN 978-0-520-25607-1.
- "Alcatraz Escape Attempts". AlcatrazHistory.com.
