= Jack Thibeau =

American actor

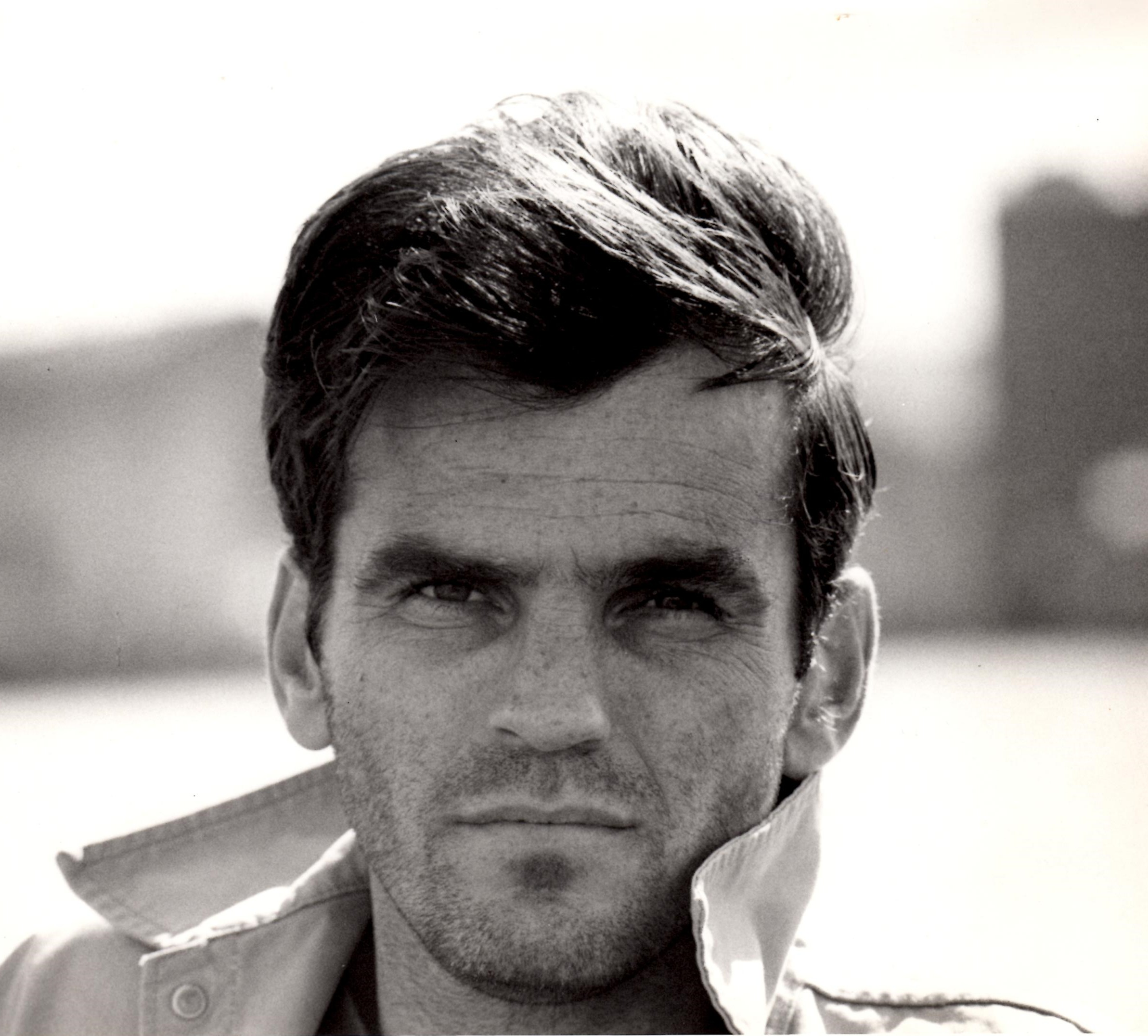
- Thibeau in 1985
- Born: June 12, 1946 (age 80); Perth, Perthshire, Scotland, UK
- Occupation: Actor
- Years active: 1975–1993

Jack Thibeau is an American former film and television actor best known for playing the prisoner Clarence Anglin in the 1979 film Escape from Alcatraz. During his career, he frequently appeared in other movies, such as Any Which Way You Can (1980), Sudden Impact (1983), and City Heat (1984).

Thibeau also played a number of characters in such films as 48 Hrs. (1982), The Hitcher (1986), Lethal Weapon (1987), and Action Jackson (1988). In addition Thibeau also appeared on such TV-series as Miami Vice, Sledge Hammer! and The Untouchables where he co-starred as Bugs Moran in a recurring role.

== Filmography ==
=== Film ===
Year	Title	Role	Notes
1979	Apocalypse Now	Soldier In Trench	
1979	Escape From Alcatraz	Clarence Anglin	Co-Starring
1979	1941	Stilwell Aide	
1980	Any Which Way You Can	Head Muscle	
1981	Ms. 45	Man In Bar	
1981	Honky Tonk Freeway	Conventioneer	
1982	Tex	Coach Jackson	
1982	48 Hrs.	Detective	
1983	Blood Feud	Stanton	
1983	Sudden Impact	Kruger	
1984	City Heat	Garage Soldier	
1985	Kids Don't Tell	Donny	
1985	Love Lives On	Mike Carver	
1985	Warning Sign	Pisarczyk	
1985	Streets of Justice	'Zero' McKenzie	
1986	The Hitcher	Trooper Prestone	
1987	Lethal Weapon	Sergeant Rick McCaskey	
1988	Cherry 2000	Stubby Man	
1988	Action Jackson	Detective Kotterwell	
1991	Murder 101	Officer (Roadblock)	

=== Television (selected) ===
Year	Title	Role	Notes
1975	The Streets of San Francisco	Ralph Cooper	
1984	Remington Steele	Kelly Stiles	
1985	Hardcastle and McCormick	Unknown	
1985	Alfred Hitchcock Presents	Joseph Pugh	
1985	Robert Kennedy and His Times	Clyde Tolson	TV Mini-Series
1985	Scarecrow and Mrs. King	Benedict	
1985	James A. Michener's Space	Captain Penscott	TV Mini-Series
1986	Miami Vice	Lieutenant Ray Gilmore	Writer/Actor
1986	North and South: Book II	Mr. Morgan	TV Mini-Series
1986	Sledge Hammer!	John Kogan	
1987	Matlock	Tommy O'Keefe	
1993	The Untouchables	George 'Bugs' Moran	Writer/Actor
