= Love Lives On =

- Genre: Drama
- Written by: April Smith
- Directed by: Larry Peerce
- Starring: Sam Waterston; Christine Lahti
- Theme music composer: James Di Pasquale; Douglas Brayfield
- Country of origin: United States
- Original language: English

Production
- Producers: Rodrick Paul; April Smith; Robert C. Thompson
- Production location: Providence, Rhode Island
- Cinematography: Gerald Hirschfeld
- Editor: Eric A. Sears
- Running time: 95 min.
- Production companies: ABC Circle Films; Script / Song Productions

Original release
- Network: ABC
- Release: April 1, 1985

Love Lives On is a fact-based TV film that aired on ABC on April 1, 1985. It was directed by Larry Peerce and starred Mary Stuart Masterson.

== Plot ==
Susan Wallace (Mary Stuart Masterson) is a 14-year-old girl addicted to drugs. After getting high with her best friend Tracy (Lauren Holly), her parents find them both passed out in her bedroom. Her father Bernie (Sam Waterston), a recovered alcoholic, refuses to see his daughter go down the same path, while his wife Marilyn (Christine Lahti) berates her daughter for her stupidity. They issue Susan an ultimatum: get clean or get out.

Several months later, Susan, now clean and sober, is rushed to the hospital when she aspirates fluid during a lake excursion with her rehab group. She is then diagnosed with a rare form of cancer and begins chemotherapy. Susan becomes withdrawn after losing her hair, but Marilyn coaxes her back to the outside, where she meets teenage mechanic Brian (Ricky Paull Goldin).

Some time passes, and Susan and Brian have grown closer. They confide in each other about how their fathers both run away from life. Brian agrees to stay with Susan even after she tells him of her illness, and the two share their first kiss.

Susan and her family go on vacation, which is cut short when Susan's grandfather, a cancer victim who had given up, dies. Brian comforts her at the funeral, and they wind up sleeping together.

Shortly after Susan's 16th birthday, she learns she's pregnant. Her doctor tells her bluntly that if she will continue the chemo, her baby will not survive, and that there are numerous risks, including premature birth, and that she will die if she stops chemo. After much discussion with her family and with Brian, she agrees to a doctor-ordered abortion. However, she gets cold feet the night before, calling Brian to come to the hospital. The neonatologist (Christine Avila) decides to take Brian and Susan to the NICU to show them what their baby might face, hoping it will solidify Susan's decision. Susan, after seeing the premature infants, ultimately decides to keep the baby, even though that will mean stopping the chemo and ultimately shortening her life. Brian yells at her for being selfish. Susan accuses him of just being scared to tell his parents, especially his alcoholic father. Brian confesses he loves her and doesn't want to lose her, and walks off.

A few weeks later, when Brian still hasn't told his parents, Susan's kid sister Christine (Keri Houlihan) takes matters into her own hands and tells Brian's mother Lucille (Margaret Blye). An argument takes place that night, with Bernie and Marilyn on Susan's side, while Brian's father (Jack Thibeau) says they can't afford it. Lucille, an abused wife afraid to leave her husband, is shut down when she tries to offer an opinion. After the Wallaces leave, Brian's father goes after him, and Brian leaves home.

As Susan's cancer spreads, she is put on a morphine pump to manage her pain, as Bernie finally comes to terms with his daughter dying. After a tense conversation between Marilyn and Lucille at the supermarket, Lucille finally stands up to her husband and gets Brian's location from him. She reaches out to Brian at a local racetrack to let him know that Susan is dying. Brian races to the hospital, where he discovers they are moving Susan to a different hospital: she has gone into premature labor.

Brian finally catches up to Susan as the doctors rush her in for an emergency c-section. Her father and longtime oncologist (Joe Regalbuto) are with Susan as she delivers a very premature boy, whom she names after his father.

Marilyn attempts to get Brian to take responsibility for his sick son, Baby Brian, but to no avail. Susan's condition continues to deteriorate. She dies one night shortly after her son's birth, with Bernie, Marilyn, and Brian by her side. Brian, unable to take his grief, walks out in a storm.

That same night, a grieving Bernie and Marilyn share a slow dance in the hallway to a ballad on the radio, “Lullaby”. The song continues to play as Brian walks into the NICU and visits Baby Brian, grasping his finger in a hopeful ending as he appears to finally accept his son. An epilogue reveals that the real “Baby Brian” is normal, happy, and healthy.

== Cast ==
- Mary Stuart Masterson as Susan Wallace
- Sam Waterston as Bernie Wallace
- Christine Lahti as Marilyn Wallace
- Joe Regalbuto as Dr. Dan
- Ricky Paull Goldin as Brian
- Margaret Blye as Lucille
- Jack Thibeau as Mike
- Bill Calvert as Matthew
- Keri Houlihan as Christine Wallace
- Lauren Holly as Tracy
- Brent Hinkley as Patrick

== Based on a true story ==
Susan Cummings was 17 when she gave birth to Brian Bobillier Jr. in November 1981, two months before she succumbed to cancer.

== Music ==
The songs featured in this film are “Wildflower” and “Lullaby” performed by David Palmer and Amy Holland. The film's composer and lyricist, James Di Pasquale and Douglas Brayfield, won the 1985 Emmy Award for Outstanding Achievement in Music and Lyrics.
