= Prison warden =

Official in charge of a prison

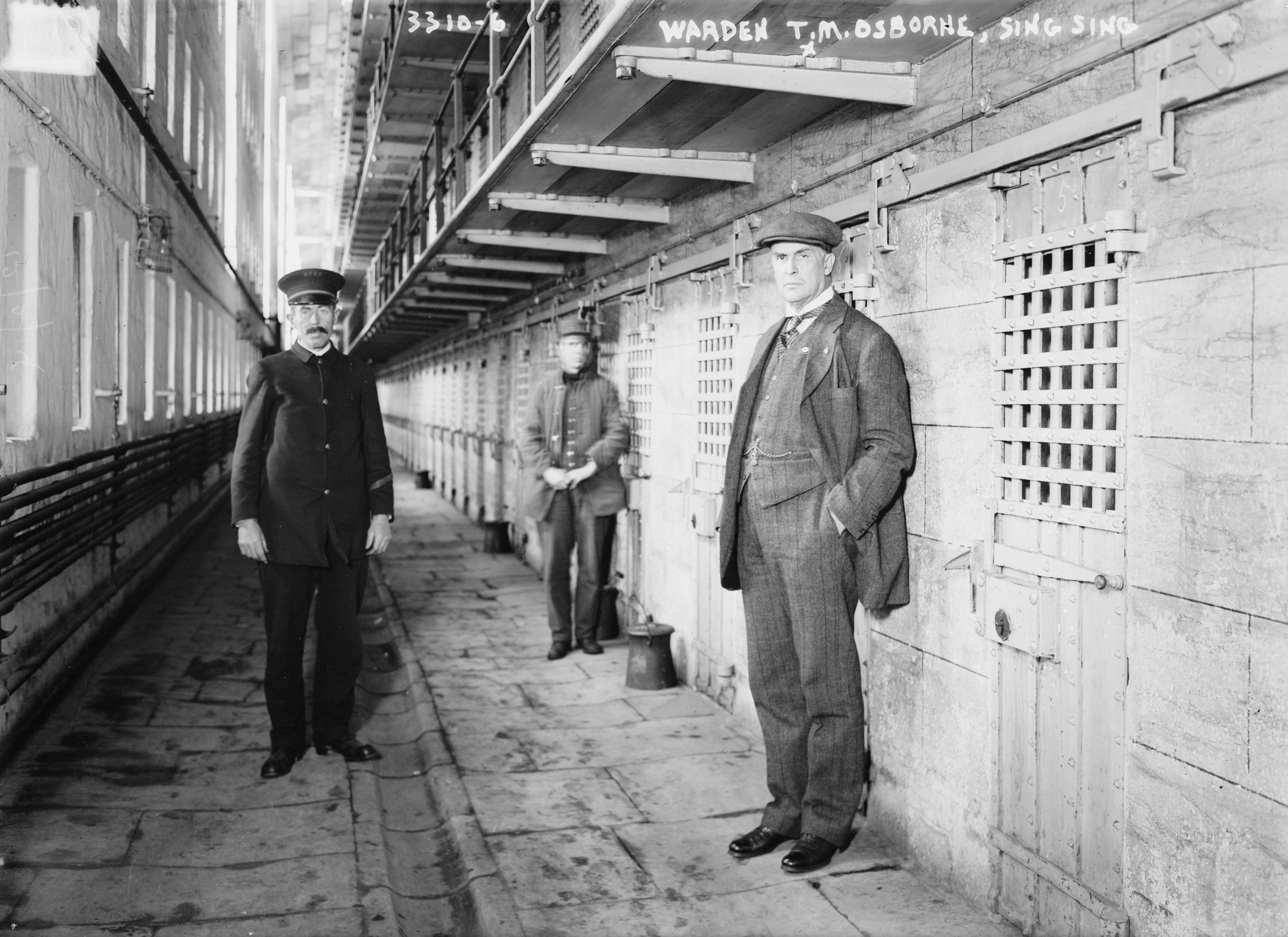
- Thomas Mott Osborne, warden of Sing Sing with two of his jailers.

Occupation
- Activity sectors: Corrections

Description
- Competencies: Managerial skills, knowledge of the law
- Education required: University or vocational education
- Fields of employment: Prison
- Related jobs: Prison officer

The warden (US, Canada), governor (UK, Australia), superintendent (US, South Asia) or director (UK, New Zealand), is the official who is in charge of a prison.

== Name ==
In the United States, Mexico, and Canada, warden is the most common title for an official in charge of a prison or jail. In some U.S. states including New York, Pennsylvania, New Jersey, Massachusetts, Connecticut, Rhode Island, California, and Hawaii, the post may also be known as a superintendent. Some small county jails may be managed by the local sheriff or undersheriff.

In the U.K. and Australia, the position is known as a governor. In New Zealand and private prisons in the U.K., the position is known as a director.

In India, Pakistan, Bangladesh, and Sri Lanka, the English-language title is a jail superintendent or just superintendent. The exact title varies depending on the type of prison.

== Duties ==
The prison warden supervises all the operations within the prison. Prisons vary in size, with some housing thousands of inmates. They are responsible for the prison's security, the performance of staff of the prison (including prison officers, prison doctors, janitors, cooks and others), the management of its funds, the maintenance of its facilities and the welfare of its inmates. In practice, the day-to-day management of security is typically delegated to the head of security, who will be an assistant or subordinate of the warden.

A warden's regular work may involve supervising security, making inspections, carrying out disciplinary procedures, writing reports, managing admissions and liaising with other professional staff who visit the prison, such as medical staff, probation officers, and social workers. Wardens are sometimes members of a parole board. They may also train staff to work in the prison service. These duties, and the efficiency in which they are performed, has varied over time and within different prisons.

The nature of the work depends on the size and type of prison. The amount of security a prison needs varies from open prisons to supermax or high-security prisons.

== By region ==
=== South Asia ===
Prisons in India, Pakistan, Bangladesh, and Sri Lanka are run by the provincial prison service. Each jail or prison is managed by a superintendent. The precise title varies by prison and state. A superintendent is typically assisted by a deputy superintendent and one or more assistants.

=== United Kingdom ===
There are currently 139 operational prisons in England and Wales, 16 in Scotland and three in Northern Ireland. There are three separate prison services covering England and Wales, Scotland, and Northern Ireland. The manager of a prison is known as a prison governor. The exception is a number of private or contracted-out prisons which are managed by a director instead. The director is assisted by a controller, appointed by the Ministry of Justice.

Entry and training varies between these services. Prospective governors would need to pass medical, eyesight and fitness tests, and should be a UK citizen or EU national and be prepared to relocate if necessary. The companies that run private prison establishments each have their own entry requirements and recruitment methods. Entry to governor jobs is competitive, by whichever route. In England and Wales graduate vacancies are advertised each year (usually October) in the national press. Opportunities for direct entry in Scotland are advertised in both the Scottish and national press.

In England and Wales there are two main routes into becoming a prison governor. The first is for existing staff to move up through the ranks (from being a prison officer, for example, or to move across from other management roles). The second route is through the Prison Service Intensive Development Scheme (IDS). This route is only open to those holding degrees, with a preference for candidates with relevant experience in the armed forces or police. The upper age limit for prison governor entry is 57. With this scheme it is possible to reach senior management in less than five years rather than the usual average twenty years.

In Scotland, there are two ways to enter. This is again through promotion from prison officer ranks or through direct entry. Direct entry applicants usually need a degree and substantial management experience.

== Associate warden ==
The associate warden is the name of an acting warden in the US that would run the prison during the absence of the actual warden.

== Notable people ==
- Joe Arpaio - The former sheriff and jail warden for the Maricopa County Sheriff's Office in Arizona, US, and self-styled "America's toughest sheriff".
- Olin G. Blackwell - The fourth and final warden of Alcatraz Federal Penitentiary.
- James A. Johnston - The first warden of Alcatraz Federal Penitentiary.
- Paul J. Madigan - The third warden of Alcatraz Federal Penitentiary.
- Thomas Mott Osborne - The warden of Sing Sing.
- Edwin B. Swope - The second warden of Alcatraz Federal Penitentiary.
- Alex Villanueva - The 33rd sheriff of the Los Angeles County Sheriff's Department in Los Angeles County, California, and jail warden for Los Angeles County jails.
- George S. Weed - A judge and warden of Sing Sing who was later succeeded by Thomas Mott Osborne.
