= John Paul Scott =

American bank robber

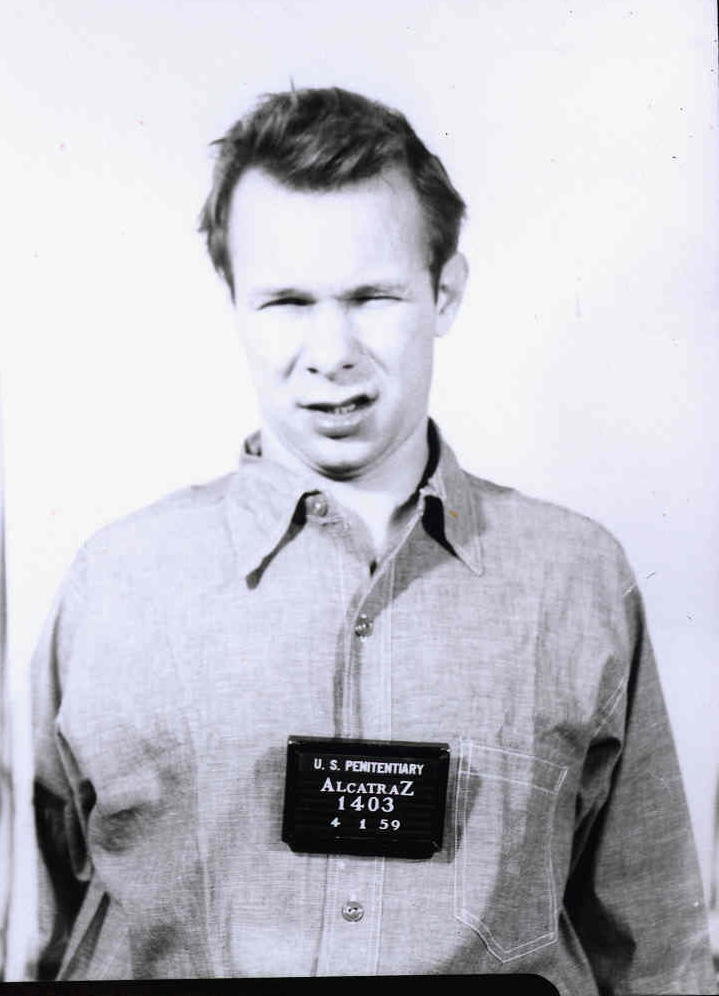
- John Paul Scott, Alcatraz prisoner #1403, 4/1/1959
- Born: January 3, 1927; Springfield, Kentucky, US
- Died: February 22, 1987 (aged 60); Tallahassee, Florida, US
- Known for: The only known inmate to successfully escape from Alcatraz Federal Penitentiary (recaptured)
- Status: Deceased in custody
- Criminal charges: Bank robbery, possession of unregistered firearms
- Penalty: 30 years in prison

John Paul Scott (January 3, 1927 – February 22, 1987) was an American criminal who is noted as the only escapee from Alcatraz Federal Penitentiary known to have reached the San Francisco shore by swimming. He was recaptured almost immediately.

== Background ==
Scott was born in Springfield, Kentucky. He was convicted of bank robbery and the possession of unregistered firearms in Lexington, Kentucky, and sentenced to thirty years in prison.

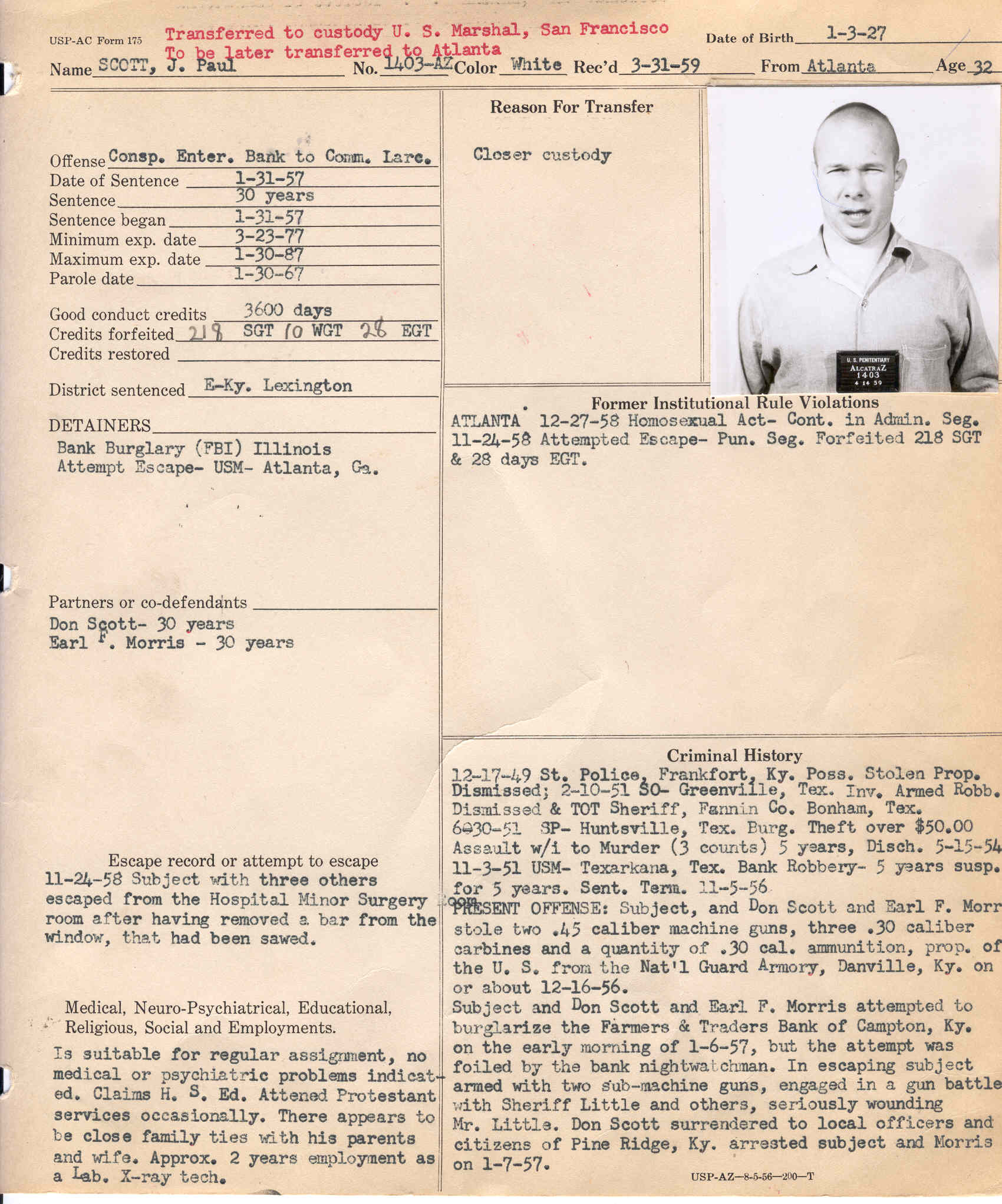
John Paul Scott, Federal Prison Record, 1959

== Alcatraz ==
Scott was sent to Alcatraz Island in 1959 and given prisoner number #AZ 1403. On the evening of December 16, 1962, the 35-year-old tried to escape from the island, together with 31-year-old Darl Lee Parker (inmate #1413-AZ), a convicted bank robber and hijacker who was sentenced to 50 years. While working on culinary duty in a storage room below the kitchen, the two bent the bars of a window in the latrine of the cell block, climbed down a rope, and made it to the water.

They then attempted to float to the San Francisco shore, a distance of 1.4 miles. For that purpose, they made water wings from stolen rubber gloves, which they blew up. The escape was noticed at 5:47 p.m. Parker had to give up after a short time because he had broken his ankle during the escape. He was recaptured twenty minutes after the escape was discovered, on the rock formation Little Alcatraz, which lies 100 yards from Alcatraz Island.

Although the Coast Guard was searching the bay, they failed to find Scott. At 7:40 p.m., the Presidio Military Police got a call from one of four teenagers who had found an unconscious man at Fort Point beneath the Golden Gate Bridge. It was John Paul Scott, suffering from hypothermia and exhaustion. The ebbing tide had carried him to this location, approximately 3 miles from Alcatraz. After recovering in the Letterman General Hospital, he was immediately returned to Alcatraz.

It had seemed impossible to escape from Alcatraz by swimming. The seasonal water temperature in the Bay is about 53 °F (12 °C) in December, and the current can exceed 6 knots. Citing these facts, as well as razor-sharp rocks and occasional visits from great white sharks, prison officers had discouraged most escape attempts. When Frank Morris and brothers John and Clarence Anglin escaped and disappeared half a year earlier, prison officials had said that they had likely drowned, although the FBI just listed them as missing. Scott's escape shook this line of reasoning. For the first time, it was proved that a prisoner could escape, if only temporarily, by swimming.

=== Closure of Alcatraz ===
Alcatraz Prison was closed on 21 March 1963, with all inmates moved to other facilities. This closure was primarily due to the facility's high operational costs and structural problems, but was hastened by the escape of John Paul Scott and others.

=== Later life ===
After the closing of Alcatraz three months after his 1962 escape attempt, Scott was first transferred to Leavenworth and later to a prison in Marion, Illinois, where he made another escape attempt. From there, he spent several years at the Oak Park Heights prison in Minnesota. He died of natural causes on February 22, 1987, in the Federal Correctional Institution, Tallahassee, Florida, aged 60.

== See also ==
- List of prison escapes
