= The Daily Jeffersonian =

Newspaper in Cambridge, Ohio, US

- Type: Daily newspaper
- Owner: USA Today Co.
- Publisher: John Kridekbaugh
- Editor: Ray Booth
- Founded: 1892
- Headquarters: 831 Wheeling Ave., Cambridge, OH 43725 (Guernsey County)
- Circulation: 4,227 (as of 2018)
- Website: www.daily-jeff.com

The Daily & Sunday Jeffersonian is a daily newspaper published in Cambridge, Ohio, United States, serving Cambridge and the surrounding communities of Guernsey County.

The Daily Jeffersonian was established in 1892. The newspaper is owned and by GateHouse Media based in Perinton, New York, who acquired it in February 2017.
