= Arthur M. Dollison =

American prison warden

- Born: Arthur McConnell Dollison; October 19, 1909; Ohio, United States
- Died: May 14, 1983 (aged 73)
- Occupation: Federal Bureau of Prisons administrator
- Known for: Associate Warden, Alcatraz Federal Penitentiary (1961–62)

Arthur McConnell Dollison (October 19, 1909 – May 14, 1983) was an American prison administrator.

== Biography ==
A graduate of Cambridge High School and Ohio Wesleyan University, he was the son of Frank Dollison, an editor of newspaper The Daily Jeffersonian. Dollison graduated from the university in 1933, and because of the Great Depression only found part-time work until 1938, when he became a guard at the U.S. Penitentiary in Leavenworth, Kansas.

After a stint in the U.S. Army during World War II, Dollison returned to the federal prison system, moved into industries and worked in prisons in Kentucky and Indiana. In January 1954, he was transferred to the U.S. Penitentiary at Alcatraz, where he became the Superintendent of Industries in 1958.

Dollison worked on Alcatraz for nine years, eventually becoming the associate warden in late 1961, under Warden Olin G. Blackwell. His was a controversial appointment, in part because his promotion from superintendent of industries to associate warden was unusual and because the Bureau of Prisons ignored its custom of promotions with transfer for training purposes.

During his term as Associate Warden, the iconic June 1962 dummy mask escape from Alcatraz occurred. Mr. Dollison was Acting Warden while Mr. Blackwell was on vacation. The three escapees, Frank Morris, Clarence and John Anglin, were never seen again. In December 1962, Mr. Dollison was transferred to a Texas federal prison because Alcatraz was closing. He retired in 1965. He was replaced by Richard J. Willard, who served as the last Associate Warden of Alcatraz. Dollison died in 1983.

== Personal life ==
He was married for over 50 years to Evelyn E. O'Brien. They had three children, Corinne Dollison Edwards, Philip Francis Dollison and Jolene Babyak.

Ms Babyak has written several books about Alcatraz, including, Eyewitness on Alcatraz, Birdman: the Many Faces of Robert Stroud, Breaking the Rock: The Great Escape from Alcatraz, and Alcatraz Most Wanted, under a pen name, Cory Kincade. Although some of her source material included her father's papers, her books are also informed by interviews and prison documents.
