= Alcaraz rug =

After 1500, and following the expulsion of the Moors by King Ferdinand and Queen Isabella, Spanish carpet design began to prefer classically inspired European Renaissance styles to the middle eastern designs they had known.^{1}Although the exact region to begin to produce the new style is not yet known, historians have attributed the move towards European design primarily to the Alcaraz in southern Castile.^{2} When executed by the Alcaraz designers, European Renaissance styles over-took the carpet field in the form of acanthus vinescrolls. On occasion, carpets motifs also included animal features within detailed design. ^{3} With the advance of European design, colors became more muted. ^{4} The shift in color palette was due to two main factors: the loss of the Moors saw the loss of master dyers and new dyes on the market were being experimented with. Popular color schemes of 16th century Alcaraz design include dark green on green and dark yellow on yellow.^{5}
