= Villa Alcaraz =

Coordinates: 31°27′27″S 59°35′54″W

- Municipality and village
- Interactive map of Villa Alcaraz
- Country: Argentina
- Province: Entre Ríos
- Time zone: UTC−3 (ART)

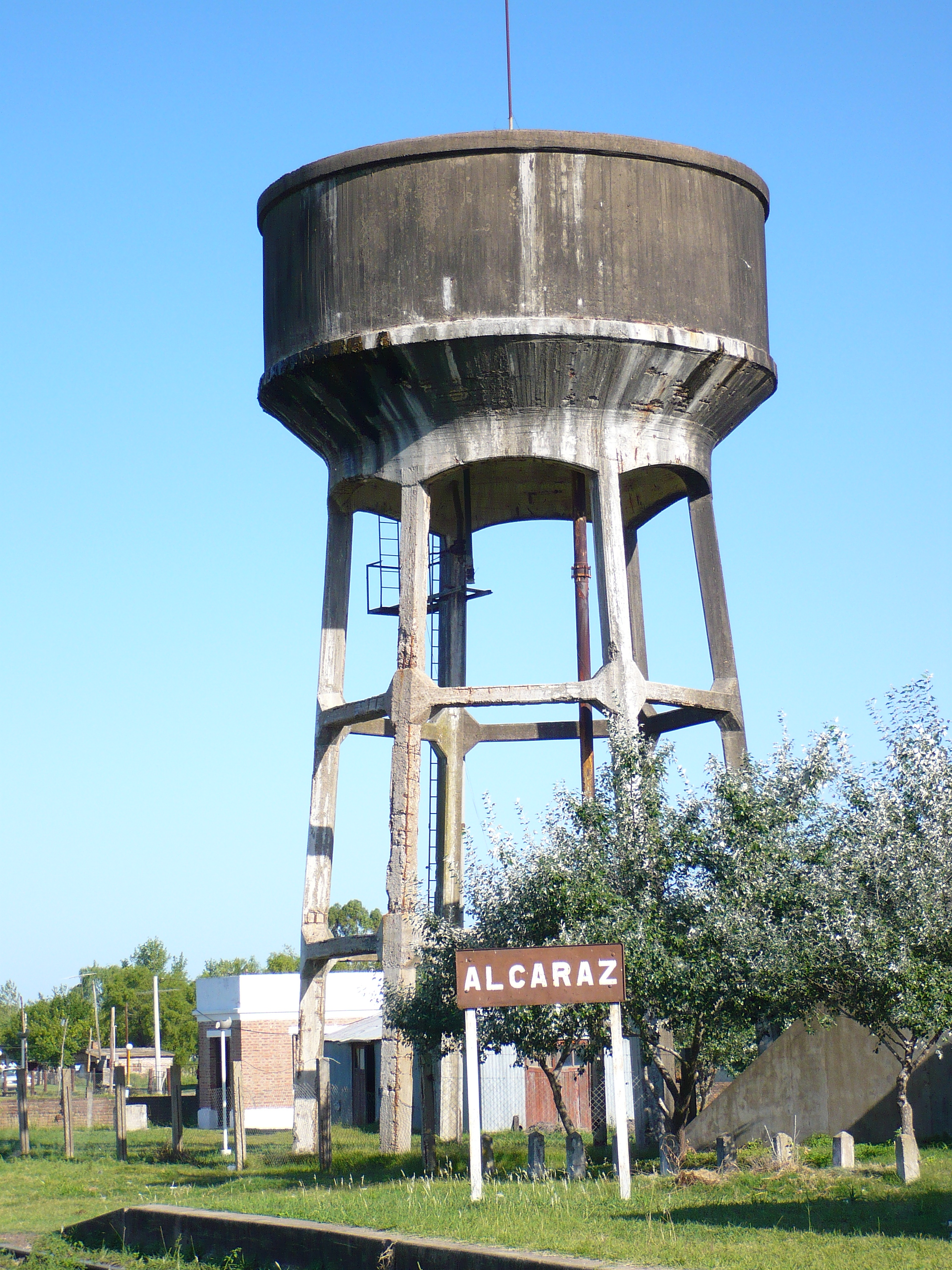
Water tank, Villa Alcaraz

Villa Alcaraz is a village and municipality in Entre Ríos Province in north-eastern Argentina.
