= Paul J. Madigan =

Prison warden (1897–1974)

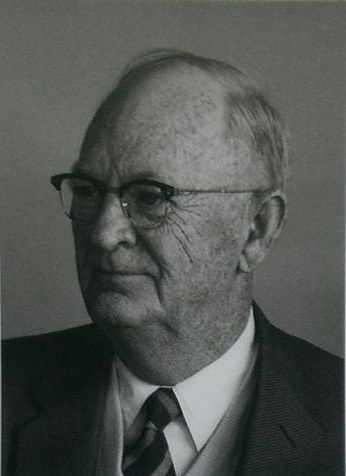

Warden of Alcatraz Federal Penitentiary
- In office 1955–1961
- Preceded by: Edwin B. Swope
- Succeeded by: Olin G. Blackwell

Personal details
- Born: Paul Joseph Madigan; March 13, 1897 Maple Lake, Minnesota, U.S.
- Died: December 25, 1974 (aged 77) Stearns County, Minnesota, U.S.
- Occupation: Prison warden

Paul Joseph Madigan (March 13, 1897 – December 25, 1974) was the third warden of Alcatraz Federal Penitentiary, which was situated on Alcatraz Island, California, US. He was born in Maple Lake, Minnesota in 1897. Madigan served as the warden of Alcatraz from 1955 to 1961. He had earlier served as the last Associate Warden during the term of James A. Johnston, the first Warden of Alcatraz.

He has been cited as the only warden who had worked his way up from the bottom of the ranks of the prison staff hierarchy, having worked originally as a Correctional Officer on Alcatraz from the 1930s. On May 21, 1941, Madigan was important in quashing an escape attempt after being held hostage in the Model Industries Building, which later led to a promotion to associate warden.

He was a stout, ruddy-faced, pipe-smoking, devout Irish Catholic. Unlike his predecessors, Madigan was known for being more lenient and softer in his approach to administering the prison and was better liked by the prison staff.

During his term as warden from January 1955, there was a movement underway headed by the likes of James V. Bennett to close Alcatraz and replace it with a new centralized penitentiary. The decision was finalized in 1961, the year Madigan's term ended, and Alcatraz was closed two years later.

In 1958-9 he was involved in a legal case against John Lee.
