= Olin G. Blackwell =

American lawman (1915–1986)

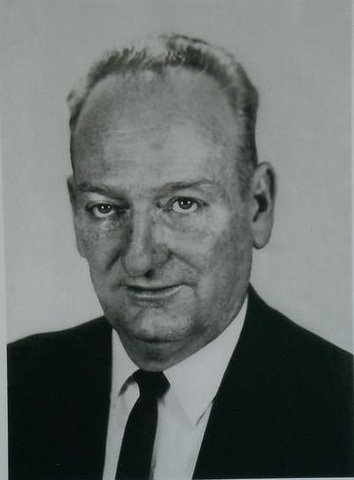
- Blackwell in 1961

Warden of Alcatraz Federal Penitentiary
- In office 1961–1963
- Preceded by: Paul J. Madigan
- Succeeded by: Prison closed March 21, 1963

Personal details
- Born: Olin Guy Blackwell; February 15, 1915 Evant, Texas, U.S.
- Died: March 7, 1986 (aged 71) Hart County, Georgia, U.S.
- Occupation: Prison warden

Olin Guy Blackwell (February 15, 1915 – March 7, 1986) was an American lawman who was the fourth and final warden of Alcatraz Federal Penitentiary.

== Biography ==
Prior to Alcatraz, Blackwell served as the Associate Warden of Lewisburg Federal Penitentiary.

From April 1959, Blackwell was the associate warden at Alcatraz, under Paul J. Madigan.

From 1961 to 1963, Blackwell served as warden of Alcatraz at its most difficult time, when it was facing closure as a decaying prison and financing problems and at the time of the June 1962 escape. At that time, he was on vacation in Lake Berryessa in Napa County, California, and he did not believe the men could have survived the waters and made it to shore. The prison closed March 21, 1963.

The prison closed on March 21, 1963. Blackwell was considered to have been the least strict warden of Alcatraz, perhaps in part due to him having been a heavy drinker and smoker, nicknamed "Gypsy" and known as "Blackie" to his friends. He was said to have been an excellent marksman.

He died on March 7, 1986, in Hart County Georgia.
