= Quicksand (Welsh band) =

Welsh rock band

- Origin: Wales
- Genres: Rock, progressive rock, psychedelic rock
- Years active: 1969–1975
- Labels: Carnaby, Dawn
- Past members: James Davies (1969-1975); Robert Collins (1969-1975); Anthony Stone (1969-1975); Jeff Hooper (1969-1970); Will Youatt (1969-1970); Phil Davies (1970-1975)

Quicksand were a Welsh rock band from Port Talbot who were active from 1969 until 1975.

== History ==
Originally formed in 1969, they featured Michael "Will" Youatt (bass) (1950-2017), Jimmy Davies (guitar), Jeff Hooper (guitar), Robert Collins (keyboards) and Anthony Stone (drums). This line up recorded one single "Passing By"/"Cobblestones" (both written by Youatt) in 1970. Youatt left to join briefly Piblokto! then Man. Hooper also left and Phil Davies (bass) then joined the band. A second single "Time To Live"/"Empty Street, Empty Heart" was released in 1973 and was soon followed by the album Home Is Where I Belong later that year. The band ceased to exist in 1975 when Davies formed Alkatraz with Youatt.

== Subsequent careers ==
After the band split up Collins became a sound man, initially for Man, but later for such people as Eric Clapton. Davies re-joined Youatt in a new band Alkatraz who recorded one album Doing a Moonlight for United Artists.

== Discography ==
=== Album ===
- Home is Where I Belong (Dawn, 1973; Esoteric 2011)

=== Various artists albums ===
- Mixed Up Minds Part 5 (TTW, 2013) - Cobblestones
- The Dawn Anthology (Essential 1999) - Home Is Where I Belong

=== Singles ===
- "Passing By"/"Cobblestones" (Carnaby, 1970)
- "Time to Live"/"Empty Street" (Dawn 1973)
