= Escape from Alcatraz (book) =

1963 non-fiction book

- Author: John Campbell Bruce
- Language: English
- Genre: Non-fiction
- Publication date: 1963

Escape from Alcatraz is a 1963 non-fiction book, written by the San Francisco Chronicle reporter John Campbell Bruce, about the history of Alcatraz Penitentiary and the escape attempts made by the inmates. It was revised in 1976 and again in 2005.

Portions of this book present the escape of Frank Morris and brothers John and Clarence Anglin, which became the basis for the film Escape from Alcatraz in 1979.

== Current edition ==
- Bruce, J. Campbell (1 April 2005). Escape From Alcatraz. Ten Speed Press. ISBN 978-1-58008-678-3.
