= Alcatraz: Prison Escape =

2001 video game

- Australian box art
- Developer(s): Zombie Inc.
- Publisher(s): Activision Value
- Designer(s): Jake Tomlinson
- Engine: Lithtech
- Platform(s): Microsoft Windows
- Release: NA: November 2001
- Genre(s): Stealth
- Mode(s): Single-player, multiplayer

Alcatraz: Prison Escape is a first-person stealth video game. It was developed by Zombie Inc. and published by Activision Value for Microsoft Windows in November 2001.

== Gameplay ==
The game is played from a first-person perspective. Players control a falsely accused person as he attempts to escape five different types of prisons in order to prove his innocence in the outside world. Players have to sneak past guards in order to make it through every prison level.
