= Little Alcatraz =

Small rock off the north-west end of Alcatraz Island

Coordinates: 37°49′40″N 122°25′31″W

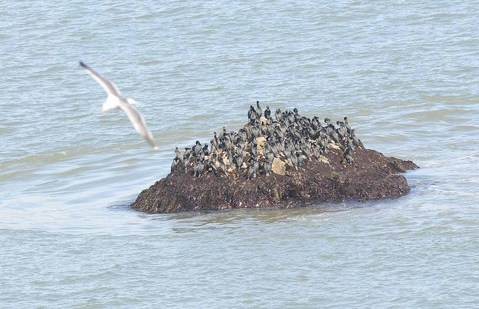
Brandt's cormorants resting on Little Alcatraz.

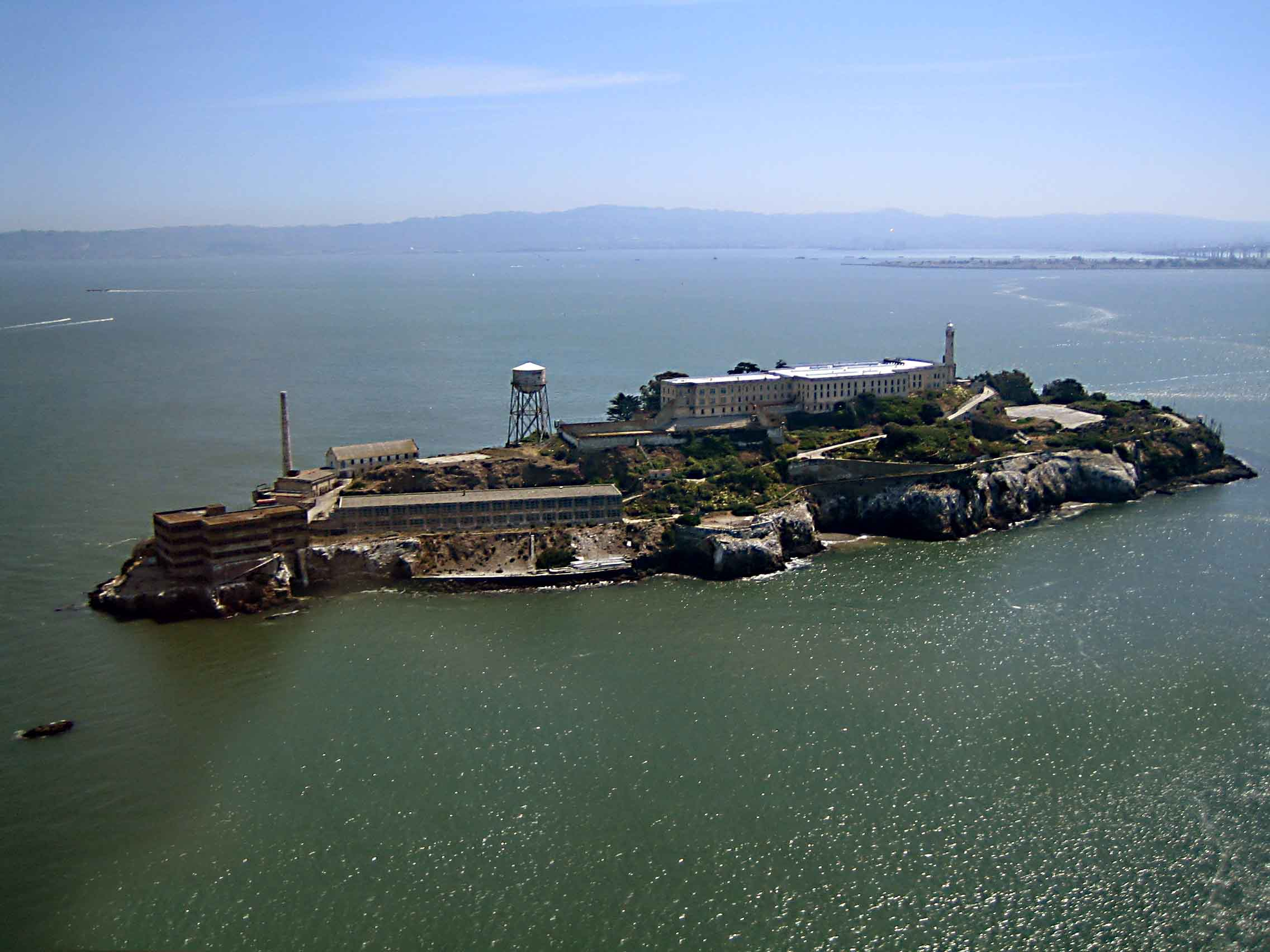
Little Alcatraz is the rock in the extreme far left, lower part of the picture.

Little Alcatraz, formerly known as Paul Pry Rock, is a small rock in San Francisco Bay roughly 81 yards (74 m) off the Model Industries Building off northwest coast of Alcatraz Island.

== History ==
Due to its proximity to the island it is known by this name, but it was formerly known as "Paul Pry Rock" due to the steamer Paul Pry striking it on December 22, 1862, with some 150 men on board. On January 14, 1868, the 700 ton British ship, Oliver Cutts, struck the rock and sank. Since it is submerged at high tides, Little Alcatraz is still routinely struck by small pleasure boats.

The rock is often a resting ground for Brandt's cormorants. During the last escape attempt from Alcatraz on December 16, 1962, Darl Lee Parker was found on Little Alcatraz; he couldn't swim.

Some members of the South End Rowing Club also refer to the pier west of Municipal Pier/Aquatic Park as "Little Alcatraz" because it was the pier that connected prisoners and goods from San Francisco to Alcatraz.
