= June 1962 Alcatraz escape =

Prison break in San Francisco, California

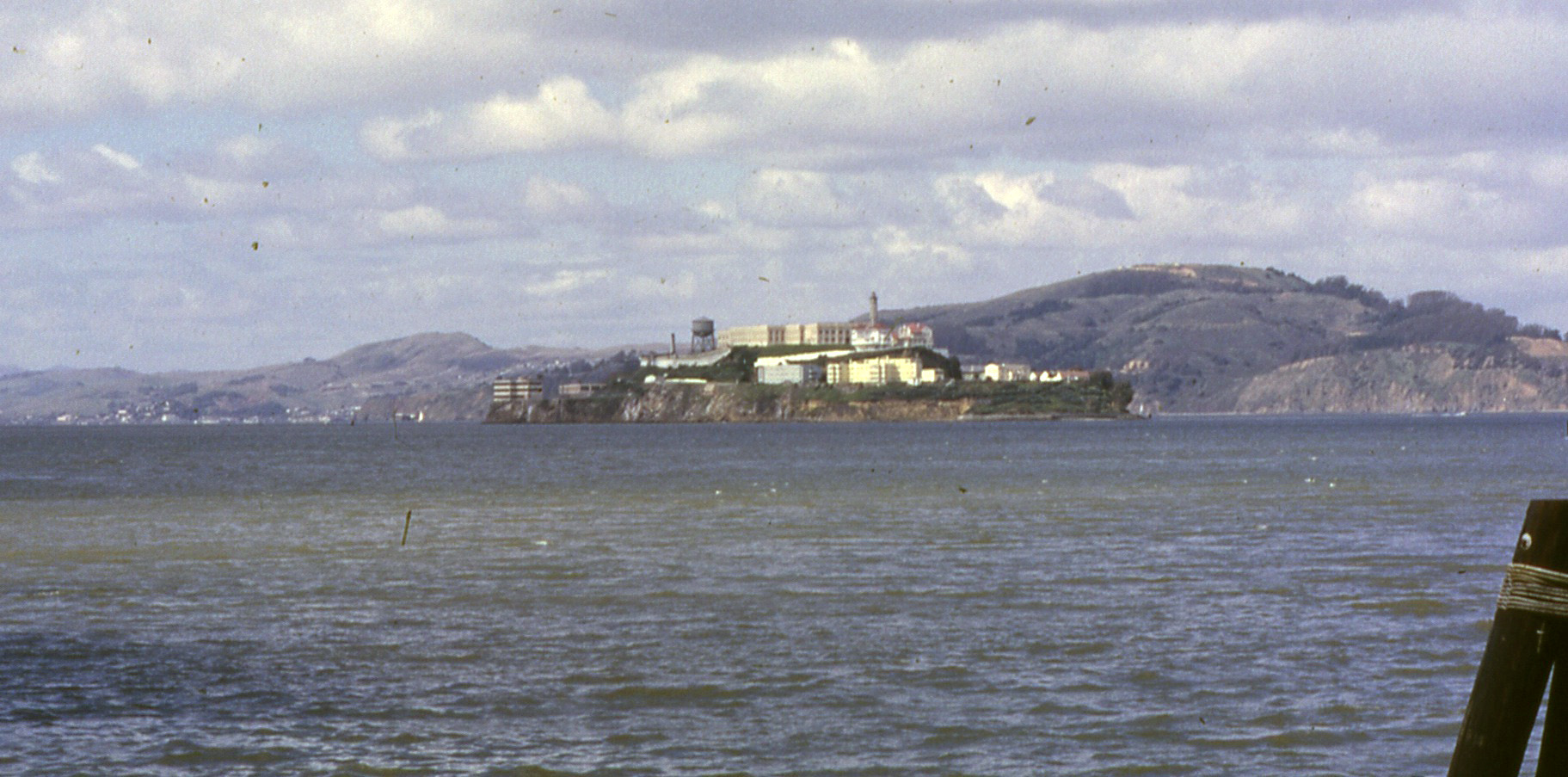
- Alcatraz, with Angel Island (the fugitives' intended destination) in background, San Francisco Bay, March 1962
- Date: June 11, 1962
- Time: Approximately 9:30–10:00 pm (UTC–7)
- Location: Alcatraz Federal Penitentiary Alcatraz Island, San Francisco, California, U.S.; 37°49′36″N 122°25′24″W
- Outcome: 3 inmates escaped Alcatraz before disappearing; 1 left behind

On the night of June 11, 1962, inmates Frank Morris and brothers John, and Clarence Anglin escaped from Alcatraz Federal Penitentiary, the maximum-security prison on Alcatraz Island in San Francisco Bay, California, United States. Having spent six months preparing their breakout, the three men tucked papier-mâché model heads resembling their own likenesses into their beds, broke out of the main prison building via ventilation ducts and an unguarded utility corridor and departed the island aboard an improvised inflatable raft to an uncertain fate. A fourth inmate, Allen West, failed to escape with Morris and the Anglins and was left behind.

Hundreds of leads were pursued by the Federal Bureau of Investigation (FBI) and local law enforcement officials in the ensuing years, but no conclusive evidence has ever surfaced regarding the fate of Morris and the Anglins. In 1979, the FBI officially concluded, on the basis of circumstantial evidence and a preponderance of expert opinion, that the three inmates likely drowned in the frigid waters of San Francisco Bay while attempting to reach the mainland. The U.S. Marshals Service case file remains open and active, and Morris and the Anglin brothers remained on its wanted list until September 2026.

Numerous theories of widely varying plausibility on the fates of the three fugitives have been proposed by authorities, reporters, family members and amateur enthusiasts, with circumstantial and material evidence continuing to surface, stoking debates as to whether the inmates may have survived their escape.

== Notable previous escape attempts ==
Prior to the June 1962 escape, two inmates, Theodore Cole and Ralph Roe, escaped Alcatraz Federal Penitentiary in 1937; they vanished into the bay and were unaccounted for, though officials presumed them drowned. Inmate Aaron Burgett drowned during an escape attempt in 1958.

== Inmates ==
=== Frank Morris ===
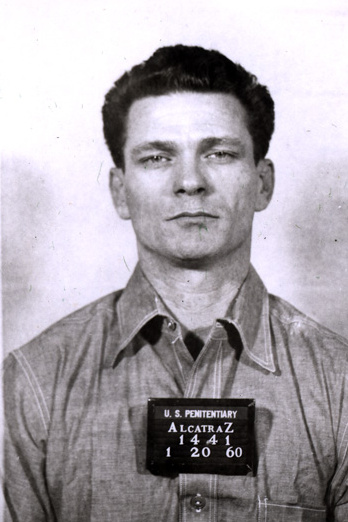
Frank Morris

Frank Lee Morris (born on September 1, 1926 – disappeared on June 11, 1962) was born in Washington, D.C. He was born to a woman named Clara, a runaway who refused to remain home in his youth. His mother bestowed upon him the name of a civil engineer whom she claimed she had married, but who admittedly was not his father. Morris was placed in a foster home, then an orphanage, where Clara visited him twice a week. Morris was not close with his mother, who had uncontrolled rages and never gave him proper attention. Morris was described as affable and quiet, but by age 6 would steal small change from a teacher's desk and rifle through children's lunch boxes. These actions occurred after visits from Clara. Morris would later say his parents had died in 1937.

Orphaned at age 11, Morris spent the rest of his childhood in foster homes. He was convicted of his first criminal offense at age 13, and by his late teens had been arrested for crimes ranging from narcotics possession to armed robbery. Later, he was arrested in Miami Beach, Florida, for grand larceny, auto theft and armed robbery. He reportedly ranked in the top 2% of the general population in intelligence, as measured by IQ testing (133).

Morris served time in Florida and Georgia, then was sent to the Louisiana State Penitentiary to serve ten years for robbery and possession of marijuana. In April 1955, he escaped from Louisiana Penitentiary with fellow inmate, William Martin; the two hitchhiked and were picked up by an African American farmer, then were let out at an oil refinery on the outskirts of Baton Rouge, Louisiana. The two inmates spent a few months in New Orleans, cased a bank in the nearby town of Slidell, then headed north to Kansas City, Missouri, where Morris was recaptured while committing a burglary with a third partner, Earl Branci, one year later. Morris was sent to Alcatraz on January 18, 1960, as inmate number AZ1441.

=== John and Clarence Anglin ===
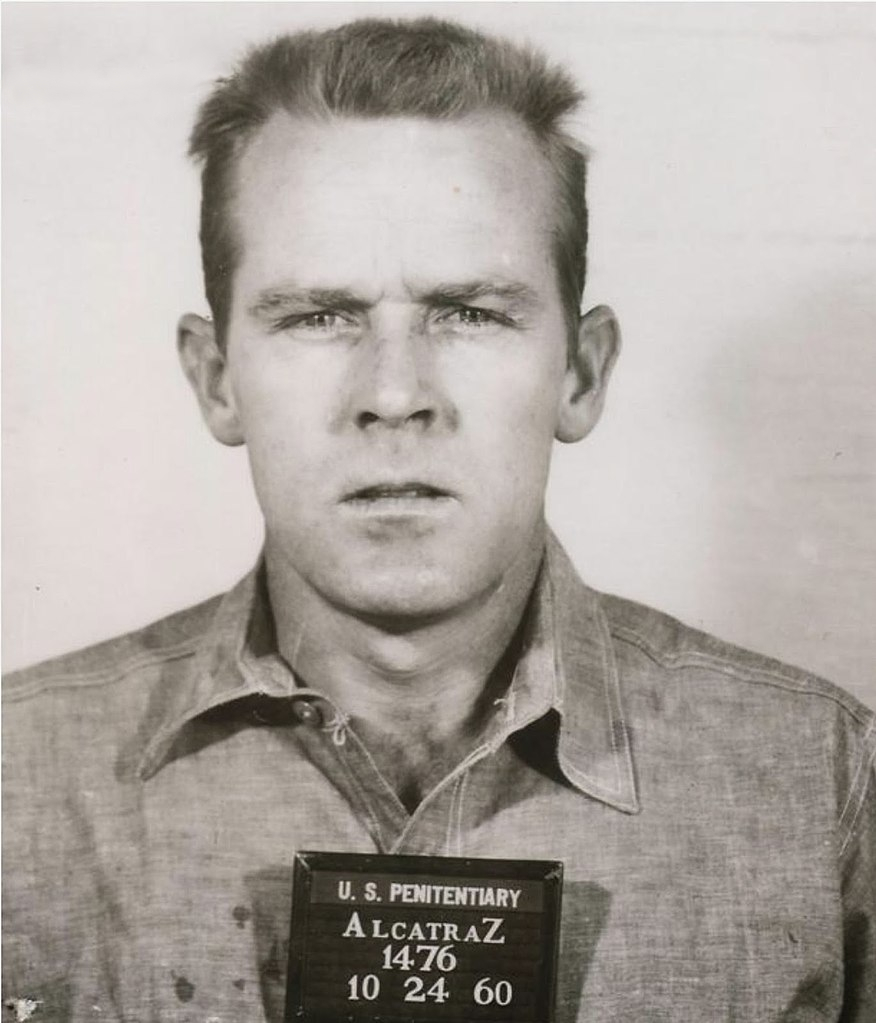
John William Anglin

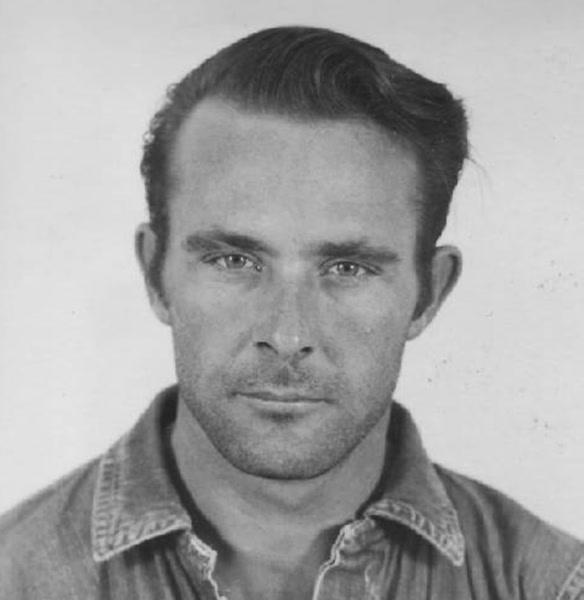
Clarence Anglin

John William Anglin (born May 2, 1930 – disappeared June 11, 1962) and Clarence Anglin (born May 11, 1931 – disappeared June 11, 1962) were born into a family of thirteen children in Donalsonville, Georgia. Their parents, George Robert Anglin and Rachael Van Miller Anglin, were seasonal farmworkers; in the early 1940s, they moved the family to Ruskin, Florida, 20 miles (32 km) south of Tampa, where the truck farms and tomato fields provided a more reliable source of income. Each June they migrated north as far as Michigan to pick cherries. Clarence and John were reportedly inseparable as youngsters; they became skilled swimmers and amazed their siblings by swimming in the frigid waters of Lake Michigan as ice still floated on its surface.

Clarence was first caught breaking into a service station when he was fourteen years old. He and John began robbing banks and other establishments as a team in the early 1950s. They claimed that they used a weapon only once, during a bank heist–a toy gun.

On January 17, 1958, John, Clarence and their brother Alfred robbed the Bank of Columbia in Columbia, Alabama, making off with US$19,000. The Federal Bureau of Investigation (FBI) captured them and all received thirty-five-year sentences, which they served at Florida State Prison, Leavenworth Federal Penitentiary and then Atlanta Federal Penitentiary. After repeated attempts to escape from Atlanta, Clarence, assuming a prerogative of the warden, tried to ship John out of Leavenworth; he cut the top out of a big bread box and bottom out of another. John sat in one, and Clarence set the other on top, then packed in loaves of bread. A truck was ready to haul John and the other boxes to a prison farm when a supervisor, suspicious of the size, discovered them. John and Clarence were transferred to Alcatraz. John arrived on October 24, 1960, as inmate AZ1476, and Clarence on January 16, 1961, as inmate AZ1485.

=== Allen West ===
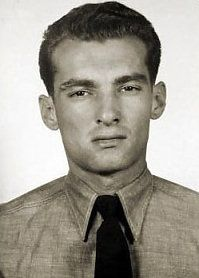
Allen West

Allen Clayton West (born March 25, 1929 – died December 21, 1978) was born in New York City. He had picked up a slight southern accent while living in Georgia. West was arrested over twenty times throughout his lifetime. He was imprisoned for car theft in 1955, first at Atlanta Penitentiary, then at Florida State Prison. After an escape attempt from the Florida facility, he was transferred to Alcatraz in 1957 to serve ten years for auto theft and became inmate AZ1330. He arrived for a second term in 1958 as AZ1335. His violent and aggressive reputation made him unpopular with Alcatraz guards. He was imprisoned in isolation and assigned to work as a maintenance orderly as punishment.

== Escape ==
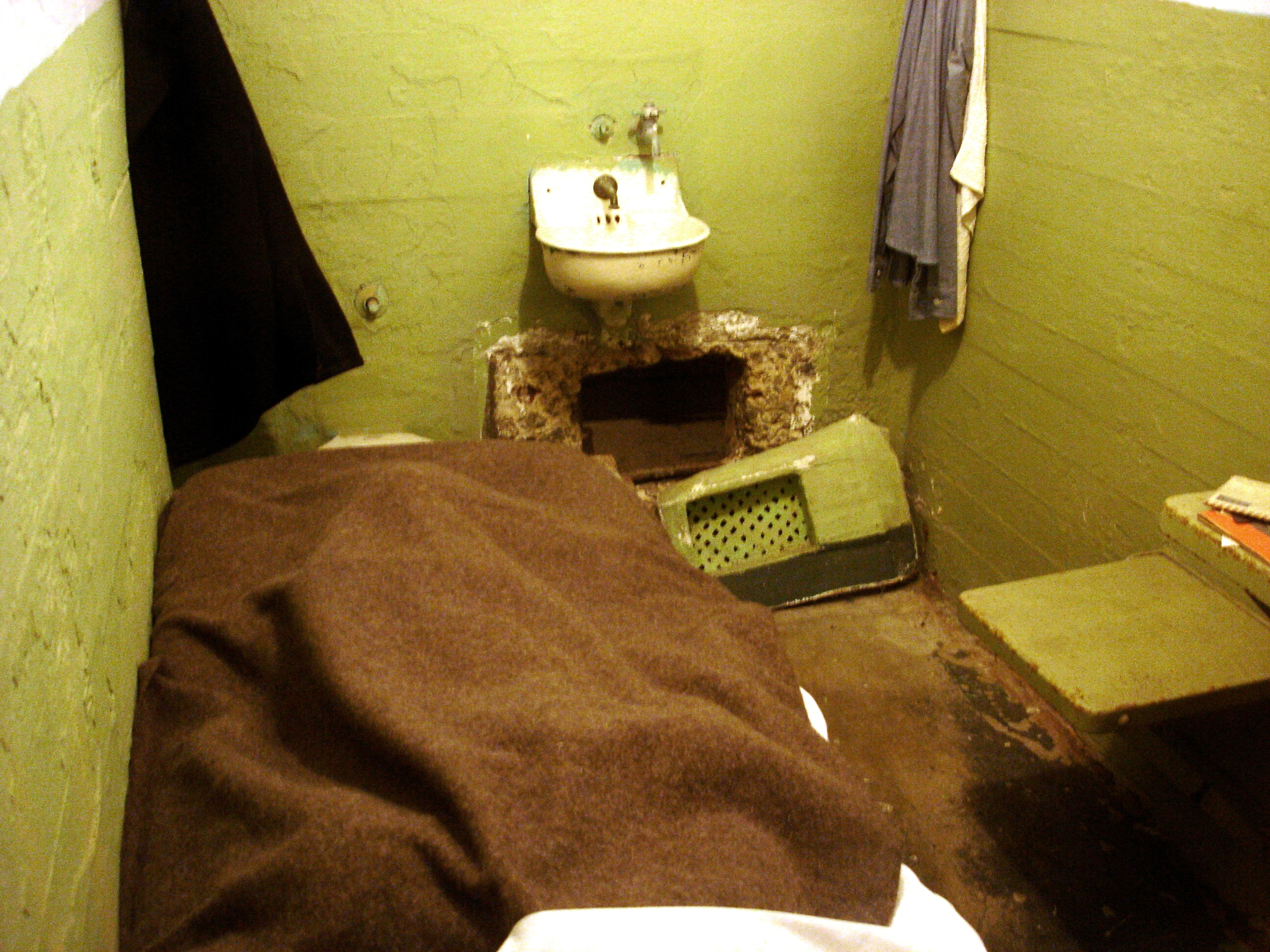
Escapee's prison cell, with widened vent opening beneath the sink

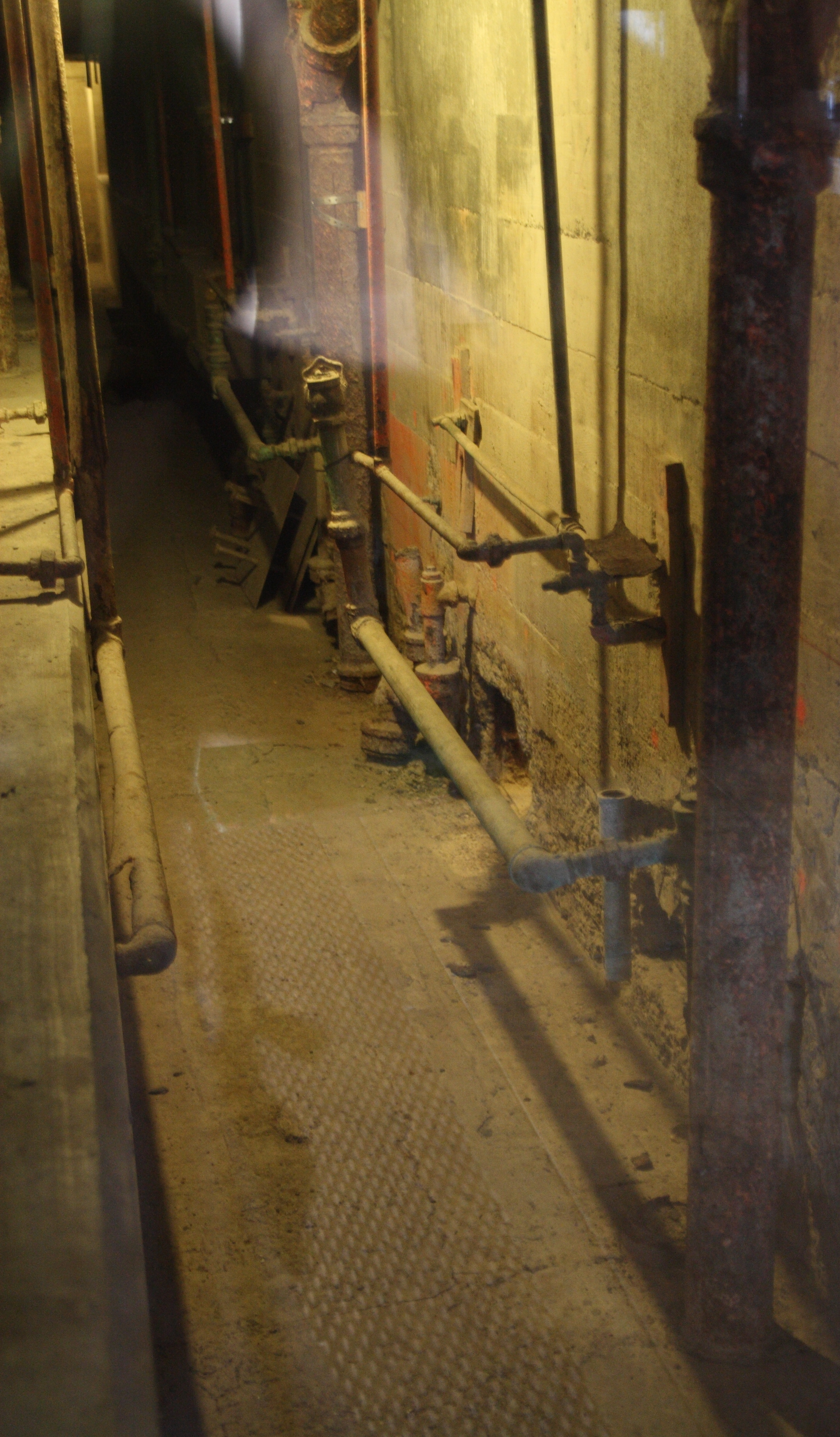
Unguarded utility corridor behind the escapees' cells

On January 30, 1960, Morris was moved into Cell No. 138 on outside B Block. West was his cellmate next door. West, who played with an accordion, was reportedly a compulsive chatterer. Morris lost West for an indefinite period in late summer 1960, when West helped stage a fracas during a noon meal to draw the guards and gave an inmate named Wagstaff a free hand to stab another inmate at another part of the mess hall; West and Wagstaff went off to D Block. Morris may have encountered John Anglin when John came to Alcatraz in October, the two having known each other at Atlanta. When Clarence came along in January, the brothers occupied adjoining cells. Some accounts suggest that Morris and the Anglins had never known West before Alcatraz. Others suggest the four inmates all knew each other from previous incarcerations in Florida and Georgia.

There are conflicting accounts as to who masterminded the escape plan. Campbell writes that the plan was formulated under the leadership of Morris, saying that Morris had a conversation with a fellow prisoner in the brush shop, in which his fellow prisoner revealed that in 1957, Willard Winhoven (who was released in 1959 after serving twelve years for robbery), an inmate electrician, had removed a fan motor from a ventilation shaft to the roof on B Block and no replacement was made. The inmate teased Morris, saying "ask the bull [the guard] for the key". Morris waited until West was released from solitary confinement in early 1962, whereupon Morris ordered an accordion like West's, before telling the Anglins and West the escape plan. Under interrogation following the escape, West claimed that the escape was his idea, saying he been painting the prison roof in spring 1961 when he realized the ventilation shafts were a viable way out. In his account, West proposed the idea to the Anglins, who then included Morris in the plan. Prison officials were skeptical of West's claims, due to his background, and believed Morris was the mastermind. In his autobiography, Alcatraz: The True End of the Line, former inmate Darwin Coon claimed that John Anglin was the mastermind.

Over the subsequent six months, the prisoners widened the ventilation ducts beneath their sinks using discarded saw blades found on the prison grounds, metal spoons from the mess hall and an electric drill improvised from the motor of a vacuum cleaner. The men concealed their work with painted cardboard, and masked the noise with Morris's accordion on top of the ambient din of music hour. Once the holes were wide enough to pass through, the men accessed the unguarded utility corridor directly behind their cells' tier and climbed to the vacant top level of the cellblock, where they set up a clandestine workshop. Here, using over fifty raincoats among other stolen and donated materials, they constructed life preservers, based on a design Morris found in the March 1962 issue of Popular Mechanics. Morris found other ideas in magazines: resin to make a lamp shade in the November 1960 issue of Popular Mechanics, and an article about channel buoys indicating course and navigation hazards, in the May 21, 1962, issue of Sports Illustrated. They also assembled a six-by-fourteen-foot (1.8 by 4.3 m) rubber raft, the seams carefully stitched by hand and sealed with liquid plastic available in the shops, and heat from nearby steam pipes. Paddles were improvised from plywood and screws. Finally, they climbed a ventilation duct to the roof and removed the rivets holding a large fan in place.

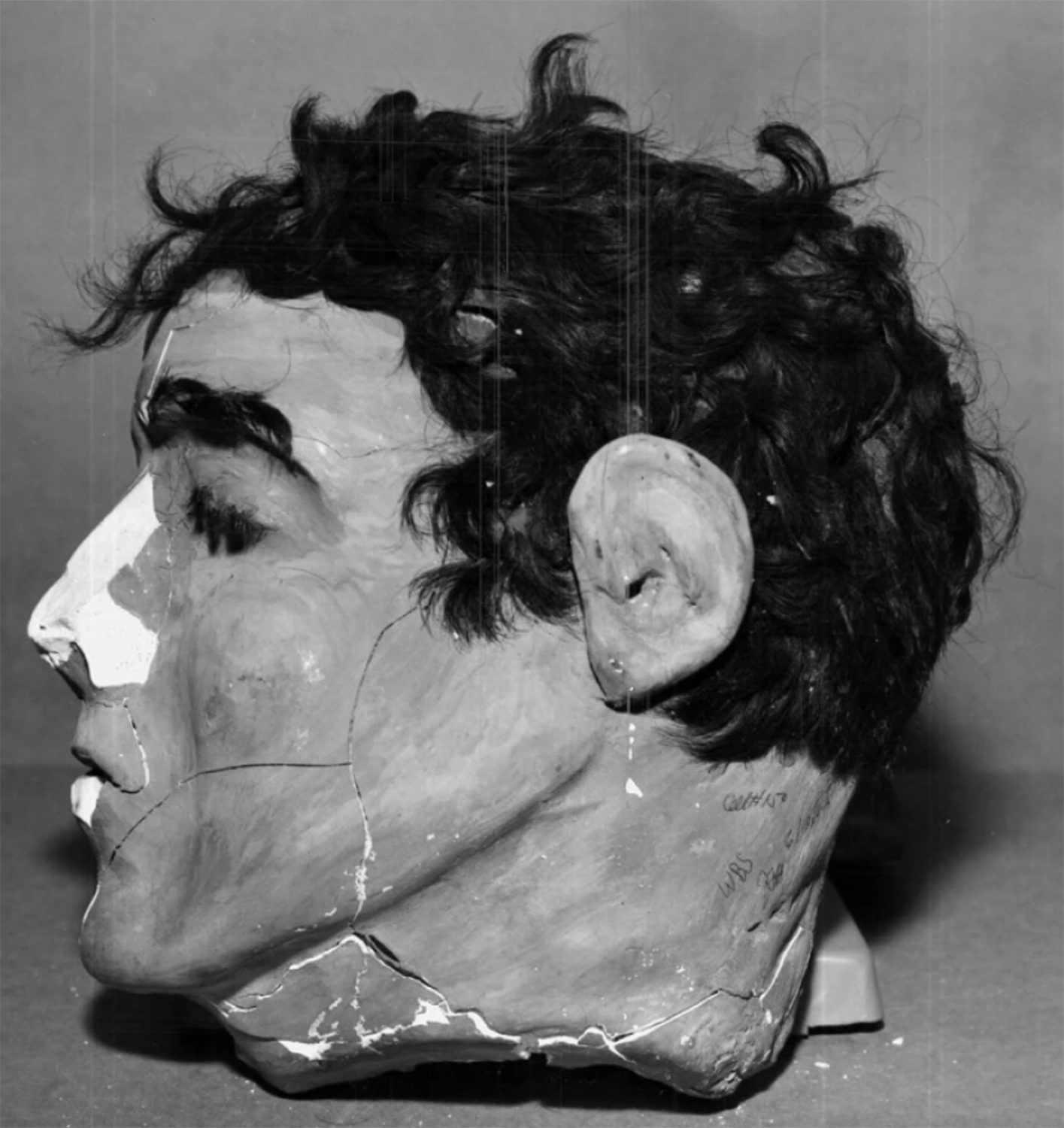
Dummy head found in Morris's cell. The broken nose resulted when the head rolled off the bed and struck the floor after a guard reached through the bars and pushed it.

The men concealed their absence while working outside their cells, and after the escape itself, by sculpting dummy heads from a hand-made papier-mâché-like mixture of soap, toothpaste, concrete dust and toilet paper, and giving them a realistic appearance with paint from the maintenance shop and hair from the barbershop floor. With towels and clothing piled under the blankets in their bunks and the dummy heads positioned on the pillows, they appeared to be sleeping.

On the night of June 11, 1962, after lights out at 9:30 pm, with all preparations in place, the four men initiated their plan to escape. As Morris and the Anglins set their dummy heads in place and left their cells for the last time, West discovered that the cement he had used to reinforce crumbling concrete around his vent had hardened, narrowing the opening and fixing the grille in place. From the service corridor, Morris and the Anglins, forced to leave West behind, climbed the ventilation shaft to the roof. Hauling their gear with them, the three men descended 50 feet (15 m) to the ground by sliding down a kitchen vent pipe, then climbed two 12-foot (3.7 m) barbed-wire perimeter fences. At the northeast shoreline, near the power plant—a blind spot in the prison's network of searchlights and gun towers—they inflated their makeshift raft with a concertina stolen from another inmate and modified to serve as a bellows. At approximately 10:00 pm, according to estimations, Morris and the Anglins launched the raft and departed Alcatraz Island.

By the time West had managed to remove the grille and re-widen the hole, the others had gone. In the workshop, he found spare supplies, left behind by the others.

== Investigation ==
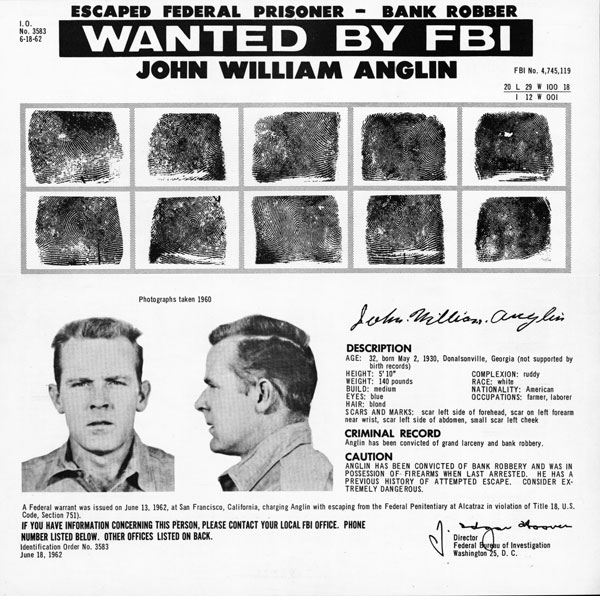
FBI wanted poster of John Anglin

The escape was not discovered until 7 am June 12 because of the dummy head ruse. After the wake-up bell, Officers Lawrence Bartlett and Bill Long tried to rouse the apparently sleeping Clarence Anglin, whereupon the dummy head fell onto the floor. Morris' and John Anglin's dummy heads were discovered shortly afterward. Military and law enforcement agencies conducted an extensive air, sea and land search over the next ten days. On June 14, a United States Coast Guard cutter picked up a paddle floating about 200 yards (180 m) off the southern shore of Angel Island, and workers on another boat found a wallet wrapped in plastic and bearing the names, addresses and photos of the Anglins' friends and relatives. On June 21, a life vest washed up on Cronkite Beach nearly three miles outside the Golden Gate Bridge. The following day, a prison boat picked up another life vest 50 yards (46 m) off Alcatraz Island, its strings still knotted at the back. Nothing else was recovered.

Robert Checchi, a San Francisco police officer on the mainland, reported that on the night of the escape, he was standing at the St. Francis Yacht Harbor, on the Marina District waterfront, when he saw a fishing boat in San Francisco Bay near Alcatraz Island. After fifteen minutes, the boat left, heading for the Golden Gate Bridge. Although this fueled speculation that the prisoners might have enlisted accomplices to pick them up, as it was illegal for a non-authorized boat to get within several hundred yards of Alcatraz, the FBI dismissed Checchi's account without giving it serious consideration.

FBI agents surmised early on that the raft must have sunk and the men had drowned. They cited the fact that the individuals' personal effects were important belongings they had and believed the men would have drowned before leaving them behind. However, as no bodies were found, the FBI operated on the assumption that the prisoners could have made it to land.

On July 17, just over five weeks after the escape, the Norwegian ship SS Norefjell spotted a body floating in the ocean 15 nautical miles (28 km; 17 mi) from the Golden Gate Bridge. Although the crew knew of the escape, their ship did not have a large cold storage facility aboard and could not recover the body. They also had no radio contact with the Coast Guard. San Francisco County Coroner Henry Turkel cast doubt on speculation that it could have been one of the escapees, emphasizing the improbability that a body would still be floating after more than a month; instead, Turkel proposed that the corpse may have been that of Cecil Phillip Herrman, a thirty-four-year-old unemployed baker who had jumped from the Golden Gate Bridge five days earlier.

West told interrogators that the inmates had planned to paddle to Angel Island, two miles to the north of Alcatraz, then onto the mainland, where they had planned to steal clothes and a car. FBI investigators announced their official position that, while it was theoretically possible for the men to have reached Angel Island, the odds of them having survived the turbulent currents and frigid waters of the bay were negligible. According to the final FBI report, the raft was never found and no such thefts on the mainland were either reported or traced to the fugitives.

Various hoaxes occurred in the week after the escape. The following day, a man claiming to be John Anglin called a lawyer, Eugenia MacGowan, in San Francisco to arrange a meeting with the local office of the United States Marshals Service. When MacGowan refused, the caller terminated the phone call. A postcard arrived at the San Francisco office of the FBI, written, "Ha, ha, ha! We made it. Frank, John, and Clarence." The FBI dismissed it as a hoax; fingerprints and handwriting on the card did not match Clarence's. A man claiming to be Morris phoned Acting Warden Arthur Dollison, but when Dollison questioned him about personal details he was certain Morris would know, the man hung up.

== Aftermath ==
West, who cooperated with the investigation, was put into isolation as an accessory to the escape. There, he boasted about his role. FBI agents believed West's claim about not being able to go through the duct was an excuse and that he may have lost his nerve. Warden Blackwell did not immediately tell reporters about West's role in the escape. Charles Raudebaugh, a Chronicle reporter, studied the photos of the inmates' cell and detected a fourth cell with a gaping hole, mentioning West's name. After phoning Blackwell, who had blundered by giving his cell photo to the press, West's involvement in the escape was publicized.

West was transferred to McNeil Island, Washington, after Alcatraz Penitentiary was closed in 1963, then back to Atlanta Penitentiary. After serving his sentence, followed by two additional sentences in Georgia and Florida, he was released in 1967, only to be arrested again in Florida the following year on charges of grand larceny. At Florida State Prison, he fatally stabbed another inmate over what may have been a racially motivated incident in October 1972. He was serving multiple sentences, including life imprisonment on the murder conviction, when he died of acute peritonitis in 1978.

On December 16, 1962, Alcatraz inmate John Paul Scott made inflatable armbands from inflated rubber gloves and successfully swam 2.7 nautical miles (5.0 km; 3.1 mi) from Alcatraz to Fort Point, at the southern end of the Golden Gate Bridge. He was found there by teenagers, suffering from hypothermia and exhaustion. After recovering in Letterman Army Hospital, he was returned to Alcatraz. Scott, the only Alcatraz inmate known to have reached the shore by swimming—his escape made in worse conditions and using gear inferior to that obtained by Morris and the Anglins—stoked the theory that Morris and the Anglins could have successfully navigated the bay. Today, athletes swim the same Alcatraz-to-Fort Point route as part of two annual triathlon events.

Because Alcatraz cost more to operate than other prisons (nearly $10 per prisoner per day, as opposed to $3 per prisoner per day at Atlanta), and because fifty years of salt water saturation had severely eroded the buildings, United States Attorney General Robert F. Kennedy ordered the facility to be closed on March 21, 1963.

The FBI closed its file on the escape on December 31, 1979, after a seventeen-year investigation. Their official finding was that Morris and the Anglins most likely drowned in the cold waters of the bay while attempting to reach Angel Island. They cited the remnants found in the bay, as well as the personal effects of the men, as evidence that the raft broke up and sank after departing Alcatraz and the three convicts succumbed to hypothermia, and their bodies were swept out to sea by the rapid currents of the bay.

The FBI handed their evidence over to the U.S. Marshals Service, whose investigation remains open. As Deputy U.S. Marshal Michael Dyke told NPR, "There's an active warrant, and the Marshals Service doesn't give up looking for people." In 2009, Dyke said that he was still receiving leads on a regular basis. The warrant will expire between September 1, 2026, and May 11, 2031, when the missing men would have reached the age of 100.

== Reported sightings ==
For years after the escape, many alleged sightings of the fugitives, as well as possible leads to their whereabouts, were reported. In January 1965, the FBI investigated a rumor that Clarence Anglin was living in Brazil. Agents were dispatched to South America but found no direct evidence that he was there.

A few weeks after the escape, Clarence Carnes claimed he had received a post card saying, “Gone Fishing”.

A man called the Bureau in 1967 claiming to have been Morris's classmate, to have known him for thirty years and to have served time in jail with him. He said he had bumped into him in Maryland and described him as having "a small beard and moustache", but refused to give further details.

Family members of the Anglin brothers claimed to have occasionally received postcards and messages from unknown sources over the years. Most were unsigned, others were signed "Jerry and Joe". The family also have a Christmas card, which they alleged was received in the family mailbox in 1962, saying, "To Mother, from John. Merry Christmas." Another of the Anglins' eleven siblings, Robert, was quoted in a 1993 newspaper saying they had received mysterious phone calls for years. The mother of the Anglin brothers reportedly received flowers anonymously every Mother's Day until her death in 1973, and two very tall, unusual women in heavy makeup were reported to have attended her funeral. The 1993 newspaper described federal officials saying that in the mid-to-late 1960s and into the 1970s there were "six or seven" sightings reported of the Anglin brothers, all in north Florida or Georgia. Robert was also quoted as saying that in 1989, when the father of the Anglin brothers died, two bearded men attended the funeral.

In 1989, a woman who identified herself only as "Cathy" called the tip line of the television program Unsolved Mysteries to report that a photo of Clarence Anglin matched the description of a man who lived on a farm near Marianna, Florida. Another woman also recognized a photo of Clarence and said he lived near Marianna. She correctly identified his eye color, height and other physical features. Another witness claimed that a sketch of Morris bore a striking resemblance to a man she had seen in the same area.

== Claims and developments ==
In an episode of Unsolved Mysteries, author Don DeNevi related his interviews with former Alcatraz inmate Clarence Carnes, who claimed that he had received a postcard from Morris and the Anglins after the escape, which read, "Gone fishing", which was a code word that their escape had succeeded. Carnes expressed belief that Ellsworth "Bumpy" Johnson may have arranged for a boat to pick the three men up out of the bay, and that the boat then dropped the escapees off at Pier 13 in San Francisco's Hunters Point neighborhood. Carnes' claims were disavowed by officials.

In 1993, former Alcatraz inmate Thomas Kent told the television program America's Most Wanted that he had helped plan the escape and claimed to have provided "significant new leads" to investigators. He said that Clarence's girlfriend had agreed to meet the three men on shore and drive them to Mexico. He declined to participate in the actual escape, he said, because he could not swim. Officials were skeptical of Kent's account, because he was paid $2,000 for the interview.

Also in 1993, a man named John Leroy Kelly dictated an extended deathbed confession claiming that he and a partner picked up Morris and the Anglins in a boat and transported them to Seattle, Washington. Later, under the guise of transporting them to Canada, Kelly and his partner murdered the escapees to get the $40,000 their families had collected for them. At a location in Seattle where Kelly claimed the three escapees were buried, no human remains were found.

A 2003 MythBusters episode tested the feasibility of an escape from Alcatraz Island aboard a raft constructed with the same materials and tools available to the inmates. Hosts Jamie Hyneman and Adam Savage, along with a crew member, successfully made landfall on the Marin Headlands at the north end of the Golden Gate Bridge. The show's conclusion was that the escape was "possible".

In a 2011 National Geographic Channel documentary entitled Vanished from Alcatraz, Michael Dyke, the last Deputy Marshal assigned to the case, uncovered archival reports suggesting that contrary to official assertions that the raft was never found or that no thefts were connected to the escape, a raft was reported to have been discovered on Angel Island the day after the escape, with footprints leading away from it. Furthermore, a blue 1955 Chevrolet (California license plate KPB076) was reported stolen in Marin County on the day following the escape—a claim corroborated by contemporaneous stories in the Humboldt Times and the San Francisco Examiner. The following day, a motorist in Stockton, California, 80 miles (130 km) east of San Francisco, reported to the California Highway Patrol that he was forced off the road by three men in a blue Chevrolet. This sparked conspiracy theories that officials may have engaged in a cover-up. Others suggest that the supposed raft found on Angel Island was actually discounted as a fishing net by the press and that the car stolen may have been unconnected.

Also in 2011, an 89-year-old man named Bud Morris, who claimed he was a cousin of Frank Morris, said that on "eight or nine" occasions prior to the escape, he delivered envelopes of money to Alcatraz guards, presumably as bribes. He further claimed to have met his cousin face to face in a San Diego park shortly after the escape. His daughter, who was "eight or nine" years old at the time, said she was present at the meeting with "Dad's friend, Frank", but "had no idea [about the escape]".

A 2014 study of the ocean currents by scientists at Delft University concluded that if the prisoners left Alcatraz at 11:30 pm on June 11, they could have made it to Horseshoe Bay, just north of the Golden Gate Bridge, and that any debris would have floated in the direction of Angel Island, consistent with where the paddle and belongings were actually found. If they left before or after that time, they said, tides and currents were such that their chances of survival were slim.

A 2015 History Channel documentary entitled Alcatraz: Search for the Truth presented further circumstantial evidence gathered over the years by the Anglin family. Kenneth and David Widner displayed Christmas cards containing the Anglins' handwriting, and allegedly received by family members for three years after the escape. While the handwriting was verified as the Anglins', none of the envelopes contained a postmarked stamp, so experts could not determine when they had been delivered. The family cited a story from family friend Fred Brizzi, who grew up with the brothers and claimed to have recognized them in Rio de Janeiro in 1975. They produced photographs purportedly taken by Brizzi, including one of two men, who according to Brizzi were John and Clarence Anglin, standing next to a large termite mound. Other photos showed a Brazilian farm that Brizzi claimed was owned by the men. Forensic experts working for the family confirmed that the photos were taken in 1975, and asserted that the two men were "more than likely" the Anglins, although the age and condition of the photo, and the fact that both men were wearing sunglasses, hindered efforts to make a definitive determination. Brizzi also presented an alternative escape theory: rather than use the raft to cross the bay, he said, they paddled around the island to the boat dock, where they attached an electrical cord—which was reported missing from the dock on the night of the escape—to the rudder of a prison ferry that departed the island shortly after midnight, and were towed behind it to the mainland.

Art Roderick, a retired Deputy U.S. Marshal who had once headed the investigation (and interviewed Brizzi himself years ago) and later worked with the Anglin family, called Brizzi's photograph of the two men "absolutely the best actionable lead we've had," but added, "it could still all be a nice story which isn't true"; or the photograph could be a misdirection, aimed at steering the investigation away from the Anglins' actual whereabouts. Dyke said Brizzi was "a drug smuggler and a con man" and was suspicious of his account. Brizzi's widow said that she never heard him mention seeing the Anglin brothers in Rio, and that he was “a con man” who was prone to making up stories. An expert working for the U.S. Marshals Service did not believe the photograph was legitimate. Dyke said measurements of the physical characteristics of the Anglin brothers indicate that they are not the men in the Brazil photo, but he acknowledged the difficulty in making a definitive determination and ruling it out as a valid lead.

Surviving family members also alleged that Robert Anglin had told them prior to his death in 2010 that he had been in contact with John and Clarence from 1963 until approximately 1987. Surviving family members announced plans to travel to Brazil to conduct a personal search; but Roderick cautioned that they could be arrested by Brazilian authorities because the Alcatraz escape remains an open Interpol case.

In 2018, the FBI disclosed the existence of a letter received by the San Francisco Police Department in 2013. The writer claimed to be John Anglin and asserted that Frank Morris and Clarence Anglin had died in 2008 and 2011, respectively. His purpose in writing the letter, he said, was to negotiate his surrender in exchange for medical treatment of his cancer. The letter's authenticity was deemed inconclusive.

In a 2019 episode of the series Mission Declassified, investigative journalist Christof Putzel investigated FBI reports on the escape. Along with the initial claims that the raft was found on Angel Island, he noted various reports mentioning a blue Chevrolet, of the same description as the one stolen after the escape, spotted in Oklahoma, Indiana, Ohio and South Carolina, where, three months after the escape, three men matching the escapees' description attempted to acquire a residence in a wooded area.

In a November 15, 2025, YouTube video, Mark Rober, along with Johnny Harris and video journalist Cleo Abram, recreated the prison escape using the same plans and period items as Morris and the Anglin brothers. They used the same magazine articles, materials and handmade tools as the escapees were suspected of using. All three, using a handmade raft, paddles and life preservers, riding on the tide from Alcatraz, successfully managed to reach a point near the Golden Gate Bridge instead of Angel Island. Thus, like with Mythbusters, they proved that the escape was plausible.

== In popular culture ==
J. Campbell Bruce's book Escape from Alcatraz (1963) documents the 1962 escape, along with other escape attempts over the twenty-nine years that Alcatraz Island served as a prison. The book was adapted into the film Escape from Alcatraz (1979), starring Clint Eastwood, Fred Ward and Jack Thibeau as Frank Morris, John Anglin and Clarence Anglin, respectively, while Larry Hankin played Charley Butts, a character based on West.

A fictionalized version of the escape was depicted in the TV movie Alcatraz: The Whole Shocking Story (1980), based on Clarence Carnes' account, which depicts Morris and the Anglins, played by Ed Lauter, Louis Giambalvo and Antony Ponzini, respectively, being assisted by Bumpy Johnson and boarding a boat arranged in the bay.

Terror on Alcatraz (1987) stars Aldo Ray as Morris, who was the sole survivor of the escape, returning years later to Alcatraz and scouring his old prison cell for a map to a safe deposit box key.

The film Dear Eleanor (2016) depicts a recently escaped Frank Morris, played by Josh Lucas, meeting the main characters during their cross-country trip to meet Eleanor Roosevelt; they help him evade police before he flees the country. They later get a postcard from Morris living in Ireland.

In season 2 of Loki, it is revealed that recurring character Casey, played by Eugene Cordero, is a temporal variant of Frank Morris. While time slips, Loki (Tom Hiddleston) travels back in time to the 1962 escape. John and Clarence Anglin are played by the episode's directors, Justin Benson and Aaron Moorhead.

David Hasteda's graphic novel Frank Lee, After Alcatraz (2022) offers a fictionalized account of what may have happened to Morris in the years following the escape, after he separates from the Anglin brothers after all three men survive their escape. The graphic novel Out of Alcatraz (2025) follows Frank Morris and Clarence Anglin surviving the escape while John Anglin drowns.

== See also ==
- List of fugitives from justice who disappeared
- List of people who disappeared mysteriously at sea

== Sources ==
- Bruce, J. Campbell (April 1, 2005). Escape from Alcatraz. Ten Speed Press. ISBN 978-1-58008-678-3.
- DeNevi, Don (December 31, 1990). Riddle of the Rock: The Only Successful Escape from Alcatraz. Prometheus Books. ISBN 978-0-87975-647-5. OCLC 022909506.
- "FBI Investigation File 76-26295" (PDF). Federal Bureau of Investigation.
- Milton, Giles (2016). "Escape from Alcatraz". Fascinating Footnotes from History. London: John Murray. ISBN 9781473624993. OCLC 936144127. Published in US as When Hitler Took Cocaine and Lenin Lost His Brain.
- Zimmerman, Keith; Zimmerman, Kent; Hyneman, Jamie; Savage, Adam; Rees, Peter (2005). Mythbusters: The Explosive Truth Behind 30 of the Most Perplexing Urban Legends of All Time. Simon & Schuster. ISBN 978-1-4169-0929-3.
- Cabezas López, Carlos (2023). The Escape from Alcatraz. Eager Dragon Publishing. ISBN 9788785410276.
