= Ismail Ramsey =

American lawyer

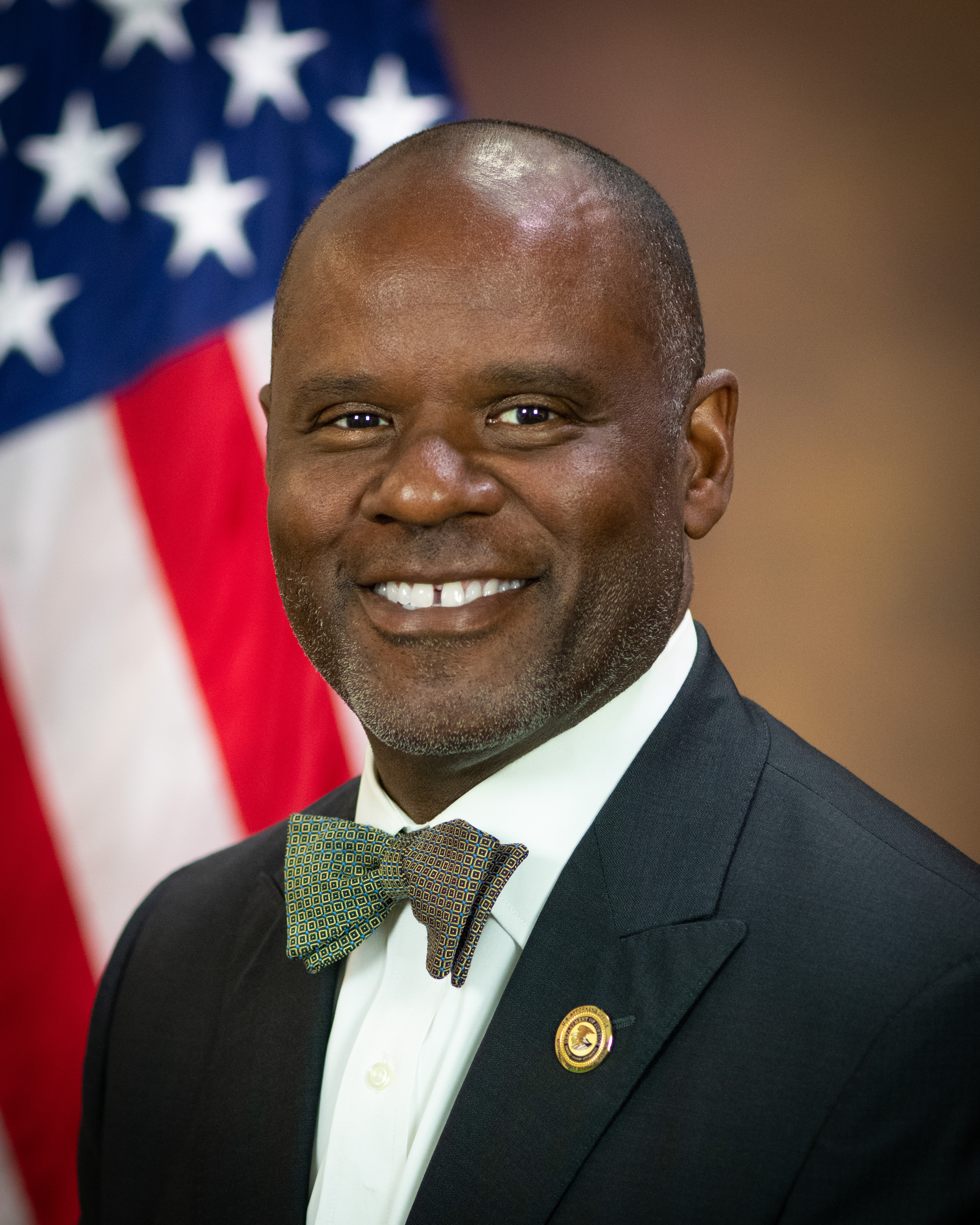

United States Attorney for the Northern District of California
- In office March 21, 2023 – February 12, 2025
- President: Joe Biden; Donald Trump
- Preceded by: David L. Anderson; Stephanie Hinds
- Succeeded by: Patrick Robbins (acting)

Personal details
- Education: Harvard University (BA, JD); University of California, Berkeley (MBA)

Military service
- Branch/service: United States Air Force
- Years of service: 1989–1992
- Rank: First Lieutenant

Ismail J. "Izzy" Ramsey is an American lawyer who served as United States attorney for the Northern District of California from March 2023 to February 2025.

== Early life and education ==
Ramsey was the youngest of four sons. His father, Henry Ramsey Jr., was an Alameda County judge, member of the Berkeley City Council, and dean of Howard University's law school.

Ramsey graduated from Berkeley High School in 1985. He earned a Bachelor of Arts from Harvard College in 1989, a Master of Business Administration from the Haas School of Business in 1996, and a Juris Doctor from Harvard Law School in 1996.

== Career ==
In 1996 and 1997, Ramsey served as a law clerk for Judge Harry T. Edwards of the United States Court of Appeals for the District of Columbia Circuit. From 1997 to 1999 and 2003 to 2005, he worked as an associate at Keker, Van Nest & Peters LLP. From 1999 to 2003, he served as an assistant United States attorney in the United States Attorney's Office for the Northern District of California. From 2006 to 2023, he was a partner at Ramsey & Ehrlich LLP in Berkeley, California. Between undergraduate university and law school, he served for three years in the United States Air Force.

Ramsey was an adjunct professor at the University of California at Berkeley School of Law and a member of the faculty for the Trial Advocacy Workshop at Stanford Law School.

Ramsey formerly served as a board member for the American Civil Liberties Union.

=== U.S. attorney for the Northern District of California ===
On November 29, 2022, President Joe Biden nominated Ramsey to be the United States attorney for the Northern District of California. On January 3, 2023, his nomination was returned to the president under Rule XXXI, Paragraph 6 of the United States Senate. He was renominated on January 23, 2023. On February 16, 2023, his nomination was reported out of the Senate Judiciary Committee by a 17–4 vote. Ramsey was confirmed by the Senate by voice vote on March 7, 2023, and he was sworn in on March 21, 2023.

On February 12, 2025, Ramsey was replaced with former assistant U.S. attorney Patrick Robbins by the Trump administration.

Legal offices
Preceded by David L. Anderson; Stephanie Hinds	United States Attorney for the Northern District of California; 2023–2025	Succeeded by Patrick Robbins; Acting
