= Allen Matkins =

California law firm

- Headquarters: Los Angeles, California, United States
- No. of offices: 6
- No. of attorneys: over 300
- Major practice areas: General practice
- Key people: Jeffrey R. Patterson, Managing Partner
- Revenue: $193.9 million United States Dollars (2021)
- Date founded: 1977
- Founder: Fred Allen, Michael Matkins, Brian Leck, John Gamble and Richard Mallory
- Company type: Limited liability partnership
- Website: allenmatkins.com

Allen Matkins Leck Gamble Mallory & Natsis is a law firm based in California with over 300 attorneys serving clients from six offices based in Los Angeles, New York, Orange County, San Diego and San Francisco.

Founded in 1977, the company specializes in real estate law and also does work in corporate, tax, labor, employment, and bankruptcy law. Its named partners are Fred Allen, Mike Matkins, Brian Leck, John Gamble, Richard Mallory, and Tony Natsis. In 2007, Natsis represented Blackstone Real Estate in Blackstone's $43 billion purchase of Equity Office Properties Trust (now called EQ Office), which aside from the federal government of the United States was then the biggest owner of office area.

== History ==
Allen Matkins was founded in 1977. The law firm concentrates primarily on real estate and litigation and does substantial work in corporate law and hospitality. It also works on securities law, employment law, bankruptcy law, and tax law.

Prior to starting the firm, Fred Allen started working as a first-year associate at the law firm Stephens Jones in 1966 after graduating from the University of California, Hastings College of the Law earlier that year. He worked with Rick Mallory at Stephens Jones, made partner there in 1970, and that year hired Mike Matkins, Brian Leck, and John Gamble as first-year associates. By 1977, Matkins, Leck, and Gamble had left Stephens Jones. That year, Allen and Mallory started their own law firm, Allen & Mallory, which was renamed after 60 days to Allen Matkins Leck Gamble & Mallory after Matkins, Leck, and Gamble joined them.

The firm started with fewer than 10 attorneys at its founding and grew to 105 in the 1980s because of a strong Los Angeles real estate market that allowed the firm to manage many real estate agreements such as joint venture contracts between banking institutions and international investors. Around 75% of its work was in real estate in 1990. The housing downturn caused by the early 1990s recession depressed demand for Allen Matkins' land-use planning and project finance experts, causing its headcount to dip to 95 by 1993. The firm's speculative development customers largely did not survive the recession owing to the credit crunch and too much supply. Allen Matkins maintained its business by recruiting massive international real estate developers and adopting a "SWAT-team approach" where people working on a different legal areas would join a project as legal issues arose. Around 1986, Allen Matkins initiated an environmental department that addressed any clean air and clean water problems that came up in the company's real estate work. It did so since the environmental liability for its clients had grown.

In June 1997, the firm started a branch in Financial District, San Francisco, owing to its desire to take advantage of the strong real estate market in the San Francisco Bay Area. Named partner Richard Mallory was the founding leader of the San Francisco branch, which started with seven attorneys. In 2006, the company elevated Tony Natsis to be a named partner, renaming the firm from Allen Matkins Leck Gamble & Mallory to Allen Matkins Leek Gamble Mallory & Natsis. Natsis had been a cochair of Allen Matkins' Commercial Project Group and was responsible for a number of the firm's major Los Angeles real estate transactions. In 2007, Allen Matkins was ranked the 192nd biggest American law firm by The National Law Journal and it averaged profits of $740,000 per partner. In 2007, Natsis represented Blackstone Real Estate in Blackstone's $43 billion purchase of Equity Office Properties Trust (now called EQ Office), which aside from the federal government of the United States was then the biggest owner of office area.

In 2009, in the midst of the Great Recession, Allen Matkins laid off six associate lawyers. That year, it also cut first-year associates' pay from $160,000 to $145,000, as did a small number of other law firms, actions that the ABA Journal said made the firms maybe "trendsetters, not renegades". After the decline in real estate deals, Allen Matkins branched out its business further by increasing its litigation team and working in other legal specialities such as corporate, tax, labor, employment, and bankruptcy. The litigation team largely work on real estate matters and also do work on securities and professional liability. By the end of 2010, the firm reversed its pay cuts as it received more work.

Allen Matkins represented Burlingame Capital Partners between late 2002 and July 2009 and received more than $6.5 million in legal fees from them. In 2010, the two companies signed a tolling contract after Burlingame Capital's lawyer informed Allen Matkins of a plan to seek damages from Allen Matkins for violating their fiduciary duty and for legal malpractice. Two days after the tolling contract ended, Allen Matkins filed a lawsuit in San Francisco County Superior Court alleging that Burlingame Capital owed them $2 million. Burlingame Capital filed a cross-complaint alleging that for seven years, Allen Matkins lawyers in San Francisco, San Diego, Los Angeles, and Orange County made multiple mistakes that resulted in Burlingame Capital paying "millions of dollars in worthless and unnecessary legal fees". The mistakes and fees caused Burlingame Capital's business to fail, the complaint alleged. The complaint alleged that Allen Matkins' lawyers employed five ways to impose "unconscionable fees": assigning too many people to work on a case, imposing multiple fees for the same work, imposing "impossible and improbable amounts of time" for work that was already done, and imposing fees to fix their own errors. Allen Matkins responded that the firm achieved a strong outcome for Burlingame Capital that more than justified the fees charged.

In 2016, Allen Matkins had $161 million in revenue. In 2017, for the 16th year in a row, Chambers and Partners ranked Allen Matkins in the first tier of California real estate law firms. In 2019, the State Bar of Wisconsin's journal Wisconsin Lawyer noted in 2019 Allen Matkins that the law firm made prolific use of videos to market itself, having uploaded 425 videos to YouTube and having paid a helicopter to take a B-roll of the San Francisco skyline. In the Of Counsel law journal, writer Steve Taylor said "one of the most compelling videos" is of an Allen Matkins lawyer taking care of a guide dog in the law firm's office while the dog's blind owner is recovering from an operation.

The Los Angeles Daily Journal said in 2010 that Allen Matkins has "the state's largest dedicated group of real estate attorneys" and "long has been considered a leading legal force in California's commercial real estate industry".

== Notable attorneys ==
- Andrew Demirchyan, former Deputy White House Liaison for the United States Department of Housing and Urban Development during the Obama Administration
- John McKay Jr., an attorney and former American football player who worked at Allen Matkins until 1998
- Kevin V. Ryan, a former US attorney who joined Allen Matkins upon being dismissed from his US Attorney post in 2007
