= Burton Phillips =

American bank robber and kidnapper (1912-1999)

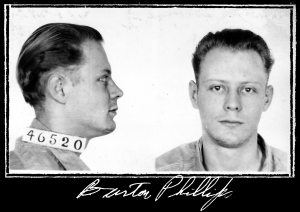
- Mugshot of Phillips in 1935
- Born: May 20, 1912; Topeka, Kansas, U.S.
- Died: July 28, 1999 (aged 87); Kansas, U.S.
- Criminal charges: Bank robbery, kidnapping
- Penalty: Life imprisonment; paroled January 12, 1952

Burton Earnest "Whitey" Phillips (May 20, 1912 – July 28, 1999) was an American criminal, convicted of bank robbery and kidnapping, a federal crime. He was subsequently sentenced to life in prison, and served time in Leavenworth and Alcatraz penitentiaries. He was released on parole in 1952.

== Biography ==
In February 1935, Phillips robbed $2,090 (equivalent to $49,079 in 2025) from the Chandler Bank of Lyons in Kansas. He took the cashier and his assistant as hostages and drove away with an accomplice in a stolen car.

He was initially sent to serve his sentence at Leavenworth Federal Penitentiary. He had planned to overpower the sheriff, take his weapons, and escape to rob the same bank again. Assessed as a highly dangerous criminal, he was transferred to Alcatraz Federal Penitentiary, which was considered more secure. He was sent to Alcatraz on October 26, 1935.

Phillips was considered a malicious, angry type, and was closely observed by the Alcatraz team upon arrival. In 1937, he savagely attacked the Warden of Alcatraz James A. Johnston from behind in the Dining Hall, where Johnston was unguarded. Phillips beat him until he was restrained. Johnston was 63 at the time and Phillips around 24. Phillips was said to have been angry at Johnston over a workers' strike. His attack was described as a "queer mental quirk".

Phillips was given parole in 1952. He died in Kansas in 1999.
