= Alcatraz water tower =

Water tower in San Francisco Bay, California

Coordinates: 37°49′39″N 122°25′26″W

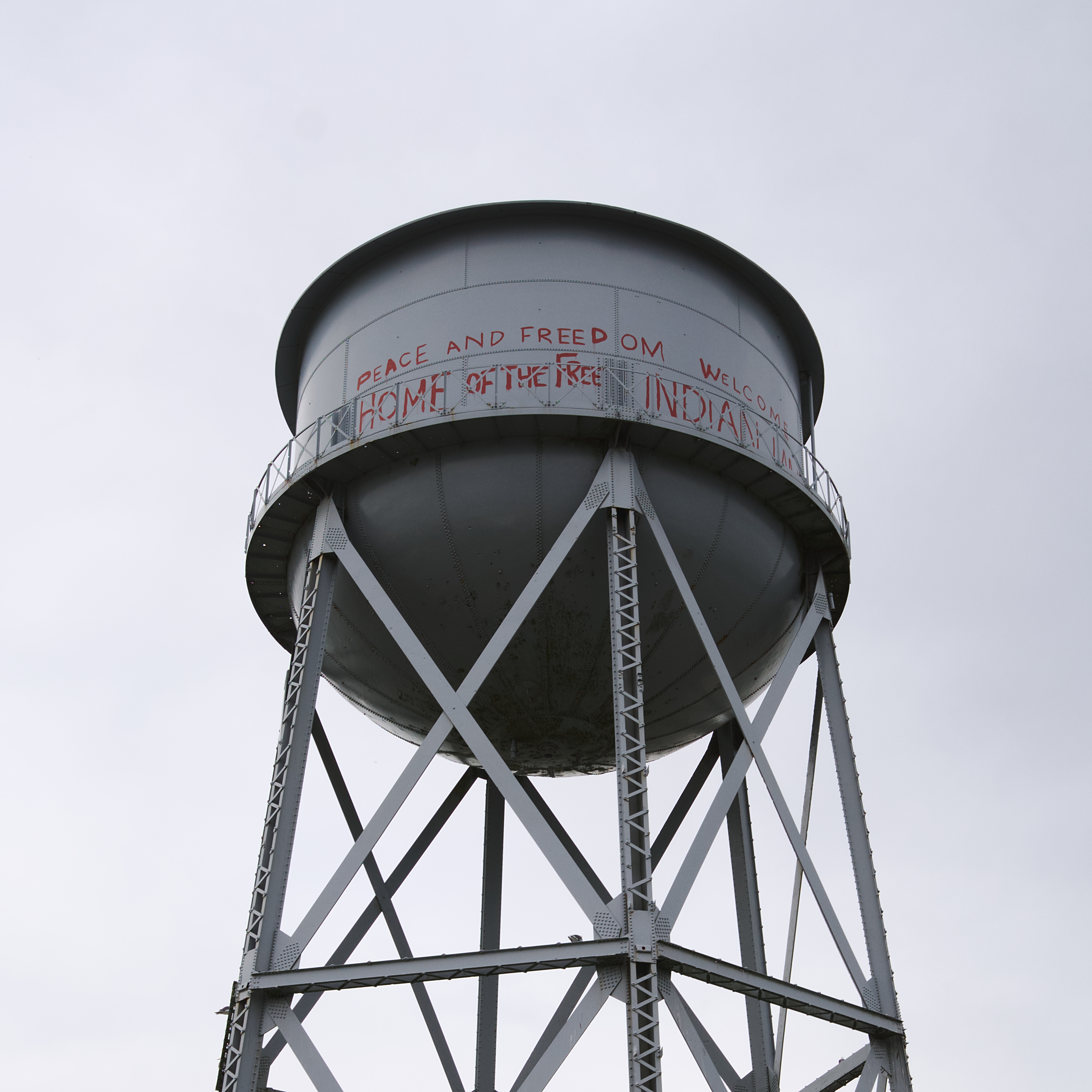
The restored tower in 2017. The red text is a recreation of writings created during the Occupation of Alcatraz.

Alcatraz water tower is on Alcatraz Island in San Francisco Bay, off the coast of San Francisco, California, United States. It is located on the northwestern side of the island, near Tower No. 3, beyond the Morgue and Recreation Yard. The water tank stands on six cross-braced steel legs submerged in concrete foundations.

== History ==
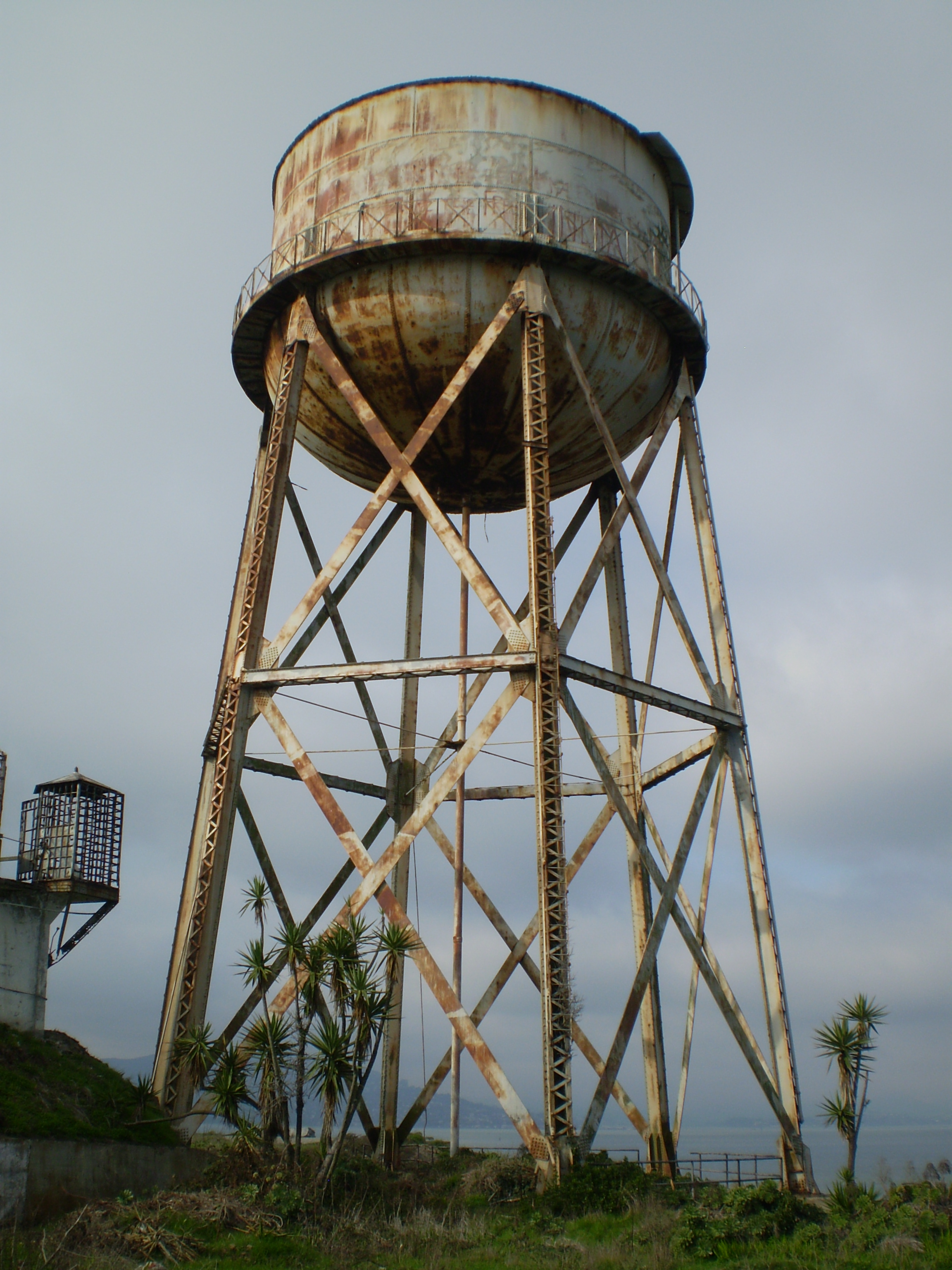
The tower in 2008, in an advanced state of deterioration.

As Alcatraz had no water supply of its own, it had to import it from the mainland, brought by tug and barge. During the island's military years, it was stored in ground tanks and cisterns situated on the roof of the citadel. The water tower was built in 1940–41 by the Federal Bureau of Prisons.

It is the tallest building on the island, at a height of 94 feet (29 meters) with a volume of 250,000 U.S. gallons (950,000 liters; 210,000 imperial gallons) of fresh water. It was used to store potable water for drinking, water for firefighting, and water for the island's service laundry facility. During the Occupation of Alcatraz, the water tower was subject to heavy graffiti by Native Americans and has since become a cultural landmark. Graffiti included "Peace and Freedom Welcome to the home of the Free Indian Land" and "free Indian land -- Indians welcome."

The tower has been empty since 1963 and has deteriorated, rusted by the salt air and wind. From November 2011 through April 2012, the tower was given a US$1.1 million restoration to prevent "irreparable damage and loss of important historic resources". Steel components were replaced and the tower was seismically upgraded. The lead paint was sanded and the tower repainted with marine paint. The famous graffiti was repainted. The tower was completely stabilized, and the slope below the Warden's House received structural remediation as it had deteriorated.

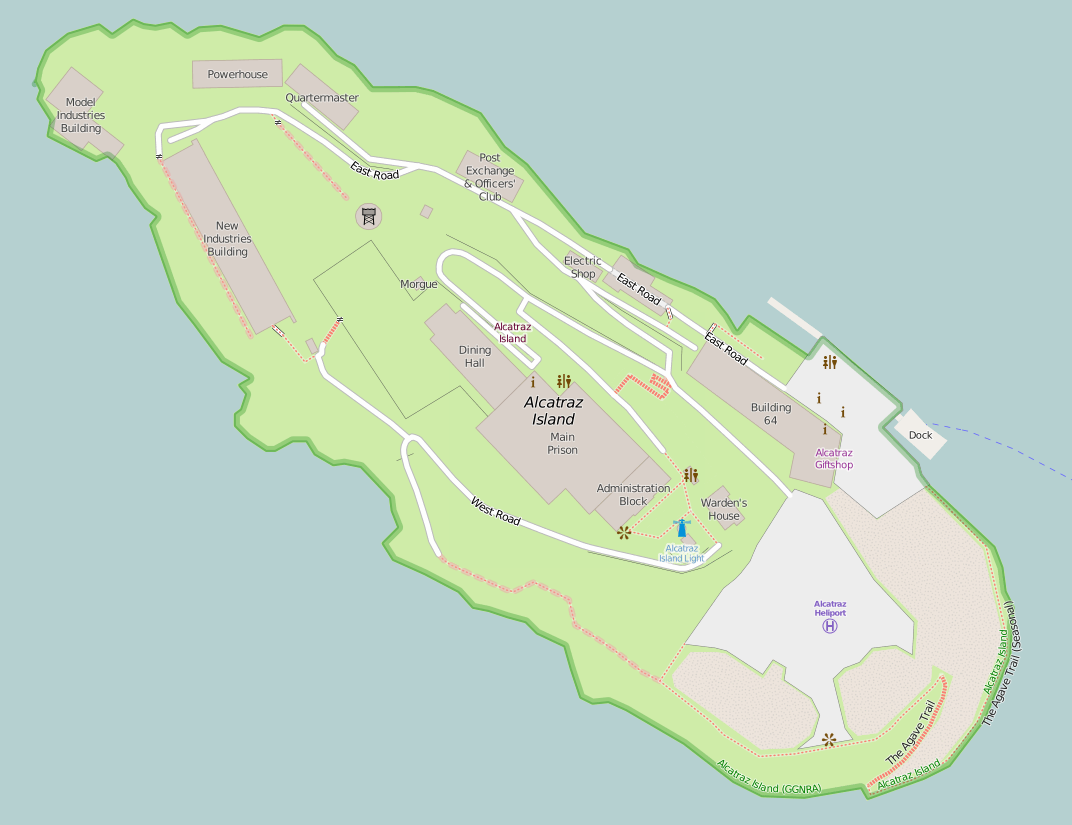
The tower is the rounded symbol beyond the Recreation Yard
