= Edwin B. Swope =

American politician (1888–1955)

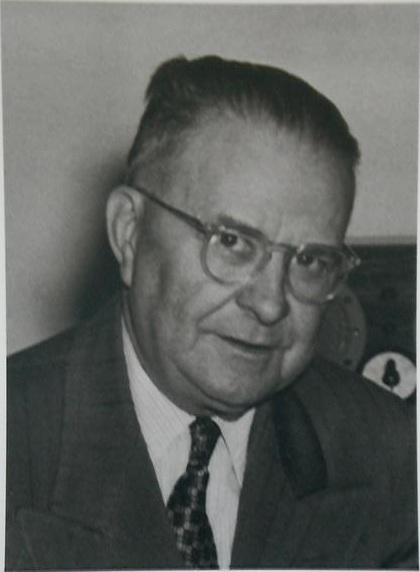

Warden of Alcatraz Federal Penitentiary
- In office 1948–1955
- Preceded by: James A. Johnston
- Succeeded by: Paul J. Madigan

Personal details
- Born: Edwin Burnham Swope; May 6, 1888 Santa Fe, New Mexico
- Died: December 26, 1955 (aged 67) San Francisco, California, U.S.
- Party: Democratic
- Occupation: Politician; Prison warden
- Nickname: Cowboy

Edwin Burnham Swope (May 6, 1888 – December 26, 1955), nicknamed "Cowboy", was the second warden of Alcatraz Federal Penitentiary, which was situated on Alcatraz Island, California, US. He was a native of New Mexico, having been born at Santa Fe in 1888. His earlier posts as warden included New Mexico State Prison, Washington State's McNeil Island Federal Penitentiary, and the Federal Penitentiary at Terre Haute, Indiana.

Swope served at Alcatraz from 1948 to 1955. A member of the Democratic Party, Swope was Chairman of the City Commission of Albuquerque, New Mexico from February 1923 through February 1925. He was appointed Commissioner of Public Lands by New Mexico Governor Arthur T. Hannett.

== Warden of Alcatraz Federal Penitentiary ==
Swope was the last political appointee to serve as Alcatraz's warden, and the only Alcatraz warden who did not have an escape attempt while serving in that role. He and his wife lived in the Warden's House on Alcatraz Island. He was described as having a soft voice, gray hair, and wore rimless eyeglasses. His fashion style of sombrero, cowboy boots, and rings and belt buckles of turquoise bore out his southwest heritage. Swope was approximately 5 feet, 9 inches tall, and of slender build. He was a fan of horse racing.

In his first 18 months as warden, Swope introduced painting and a prisoners' orchestra as reform measures. He was a strict disciplinarian but unlike his predecessor, James A. Johnston, he was considered the most disliked warden of Alcatraz with his officers and the inmates. He once said, in response to an inmate who complained to him on the recreation yard about his term of 199 years, which was really a life sentence, "My boy, we're all doing life. Every one of us is doing life."

In 1950, Swope brought movies to the Alcatraz, which were viewed in the chapel every other weekend, although at some stage movies were shown in the auditorium above the dining room. At the age of 66, he resigned from his post at Alcatraz on January 21, 1955, shortly before his death.
