= Kevin V. Ryan =

American lawyer

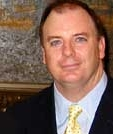

United States Attorney for the Northern District of California
- In office 2002–2007
- Nominated by: George W. Bush

Personal details
- Born: 1957 (age 68–69) Alberta, Canada
- Education: Dartmouth College (BA); University of San Francisco (JD)

Kevin V. Ryan (born 1957) is a former United States Attorney for the Northern District of California. He was one of the attorneys whose name was mentioned in connection to the Dismissal of U.S. attorneys controversy.

== Education and background ==
Ryan was born in Alberta Canada to Irish immigrant parents. Ryan was raised in San Francisco, graduating from Saint Ignatius College Preparatory. Ryan earned a Bachelor of Arts degree in History from Dartmouth College in 1980, and received his Juris Doctor from the University of San Francisco School of Law in 1984.

Ryan began his legal career in California as a prosecutor with the Alameda County District Attorney's Office. While working with the District Attorney's Office, he handled a variety of cases including homicides and violent gang prosecutions.

In 1996, while serving as a member of the Violent Gang Suppression Unit, Ryan was appointed by Governor Pete Wilson to serve as a Judge on the San Francisco Municipal Court.

== U.S. Attorney career and dismissal ==
President George W. Bush nominated Ryan as the United States Attorney for the Northern District of California. His nomination to was at the recommendation of Joseph P. Russoniello, a previous holder of the office. Ryan was confirmed by the United States Senate in July 2002.

Ryan was part of a controversy relating to the dismissal of nine U.S. Attorneys by Attorney General Alberto Gonzales and announced his resignation in January 2007. The Los Angeles Times reported that Ryan was a "loyal Bush supporter" and that the Justice Department fired him primarily out of concern that his poor performance could cause a public relations problem. According to the report, Ryan's problems in office were "well documented in legal newspapers" but "Justice officials wanted to keep Ryan on, even as they plotted the firings of other U.S. attorneys." Publicly released emails between Justice Department officials suggest that they reluctantly added him to the list of attorneys to be fired due to a Federal judge's threat to obtain and potentially release copies of his "blistering" negative evaluations.

== City of San Francisco ==
In 2008, Ryan was hired by San Francisco Mayor Gavin Newsom to be his criminal justice advisor to address San Francisco's rising homicide rates. He resigned from the position in December 2009.
