= Joseph Russoniello =

American attorney

Joseph P. Russoniello
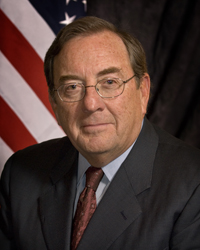

U.S. Attorney for the Northern District of California
- In office January 4, 2008 – August 13, 2010
- Preceded by: Scott Schools
- Succeeded by: Melinda Haag
- Constituency: Northern District of California

Personal details
- Born: October 12, 1941 (age 84) Jersey City, New Jersey
- Education: Fairfield, B.A. NYU Law, J.D.

Joseph P. Russoniello (born October 12, 1941) is an American attorney who served two terms as the U.S. Attorney for the Northern District of California. Russoniello served his first term from 1982 to 1990 and his second term from 2008 to 2010.

== Education and early career ==
Born in Jersey City, New Jersey, Russoniello graduated in 1959 from St. Peter's Preparatory School in Jersey City. He received a B.S.S. degree from Fairfield University in 1963 and a J.D. degree from New York University Law School in 1966. After graduating from law school, Russoniello was appointed a Special Agent with the Federal Bureau of Investigation, and later served as an Assistant District Attorney for the City and County of San Francisco before joining Cooley Godward Kronish LLP in 1975.

== U.S. Attorney: first term (1982–1990) ==
From January 1982 to March 1990, Russoniello served his first term as the U.S. Attorney for the Northern District of California. He personally prosecuted Larry Layton of the Peoples Temple for his part in the murder of Congressman Leo Ryan in Jonestown, Guyana, and tried several other high profile criminal and civil cases.

His office prosecuted the Hitachi and Mitsubishi corporations for their theft of IBM secrets; Jerry Whitworth and James D. Harper Jr. in separate espionage cases; and dozens of white collar crime cases involving financial institution fraud, money laundering, securities fraud, public corruption, defense procurement fraud, other government contract fraud, export control violations, copyright infringement and trademark counterfeiting.

Until his resignation, he was a member of the United States Attorney General's Advisory Committee, served as chairman of its White Collar Crime Subcommittee and was a member of the Economic Crime Council of the Department of Justice.

== Private practice and dean: (1990–2007) ==
Before returning to the U.S. Attorney's Office, Russoniello was senior counsel and resident in the San Francisco office of Cooley Godward Kronish LLP where he was a member of the Litigation department and the practice group for Business Crimes & Regulatory Defense. Russoniello also served as dean of the San Francisco Law School for five and a half years until his resignation in July 2007.

== U.S. Attorney: second term (2008–2010) ==
In 2008, Russoniello was nominated again to serve as the U.S. Attorney for the Northern District of California (which encompasses the 15 counties from the Oregon-California border to Monterey, including the San Francisco Bay Area). Upon taking office, Russoniello indicated that his priorities during his second term would include national security, helping to get guns off the street and prosecuting Internet child pornography distribution. He is also overseeing his office's prosecution of Barry Bonds, former San Francisco Giants outfielder and all-time Major League Baseball home run king, on perjury charges, as well as Ed Jew, former Member of the San Francisco Board of Supervisors, on extortion and bribery charges. Russoniello was succeeded in August 2010 by Melinda Haag.

== Other affiliations ==
Russoniello is a member of the American College of Trial Lawyers, the Edward McFetridge Inn of the American Inns of Court, the American Board of Trial Lawyers, the American Law Institute and numerous civic and legal organizations.

Russoniello was, until his recent appointment as United States Attorney, a member of the National Review Board of the U.S. Conference of Catholic Bishops (USCCB).
