= Alcatraz Morgue =

Morgue on Alcatraz Island

Coordinates: 37°49′38″N 122°25′25″W

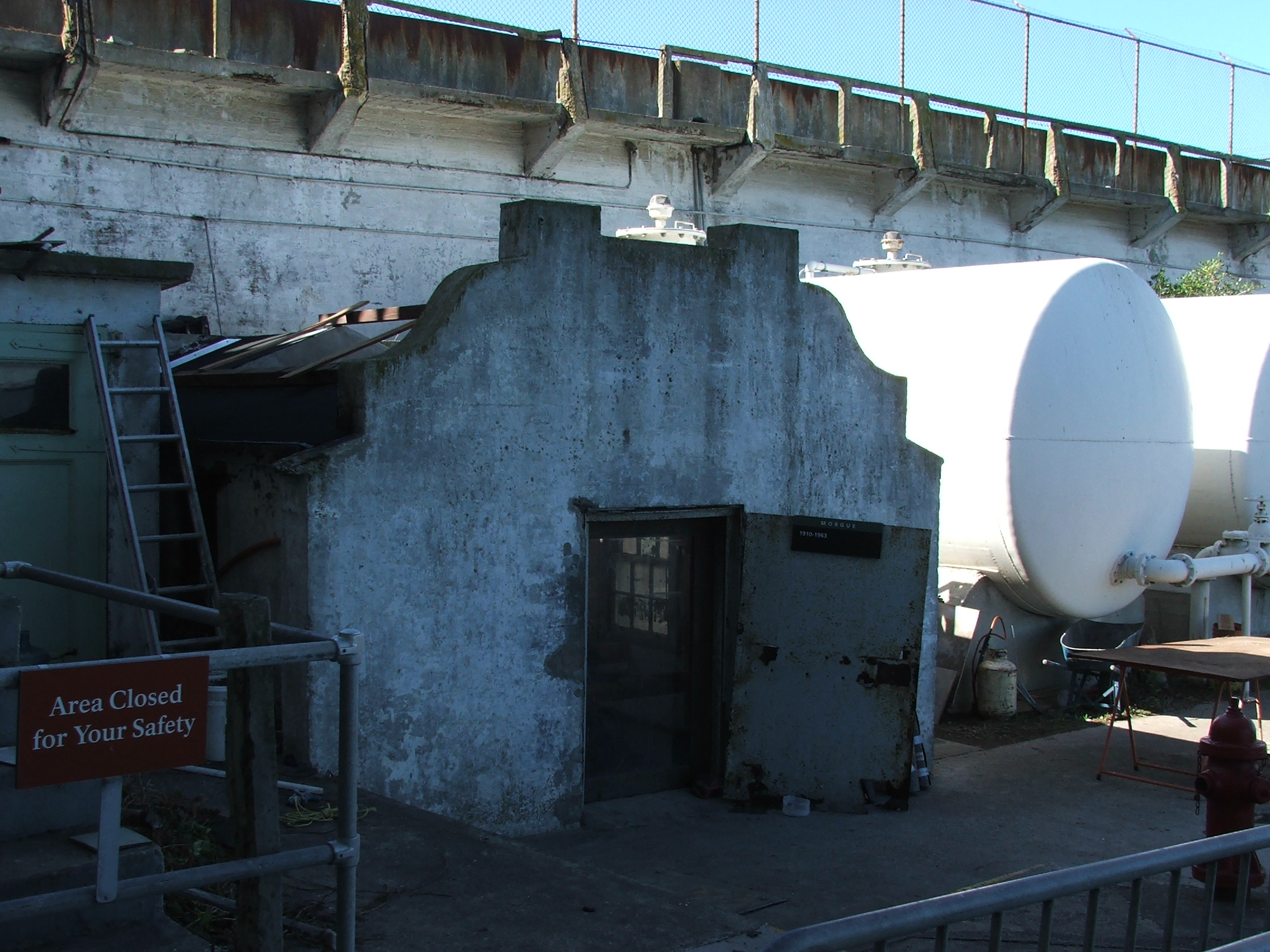
Morgue exterior in 2008

Alcatraz Morgue is the morgue on Alcatraz Island, off the coast of San Francisco, California, United States. It is located on the northwestern side of the island towards the centre, halfway between the Alcatraz Water Tower and the Dining Hall, below the side of the Recreation Yard.

== Architecture ==
The morgue was built in 1910 by the U.S. military on a site which was formerly the entrance to a tunnel which was used by soldiers from the 1870s to cross to the opposite side of the island. It is described as "one of the simplest expressions of the mission revival style on Alcatraz." The morgue was built with three vaults and an examination table, with a steel door and a grated skylight. The double-door is a mint green color and is padlocked. The examination table is now covered with moss and in poor condition.

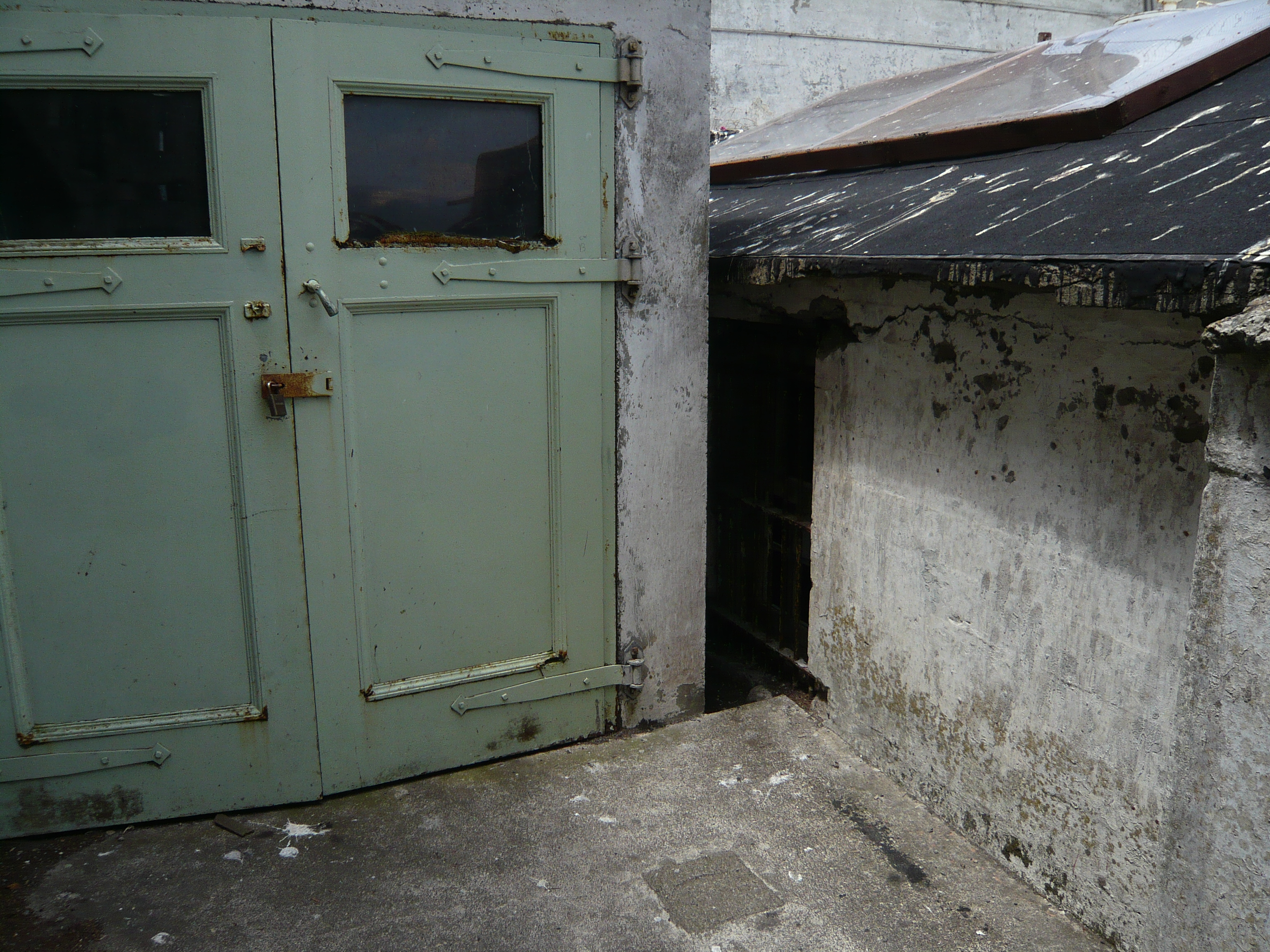
Doors

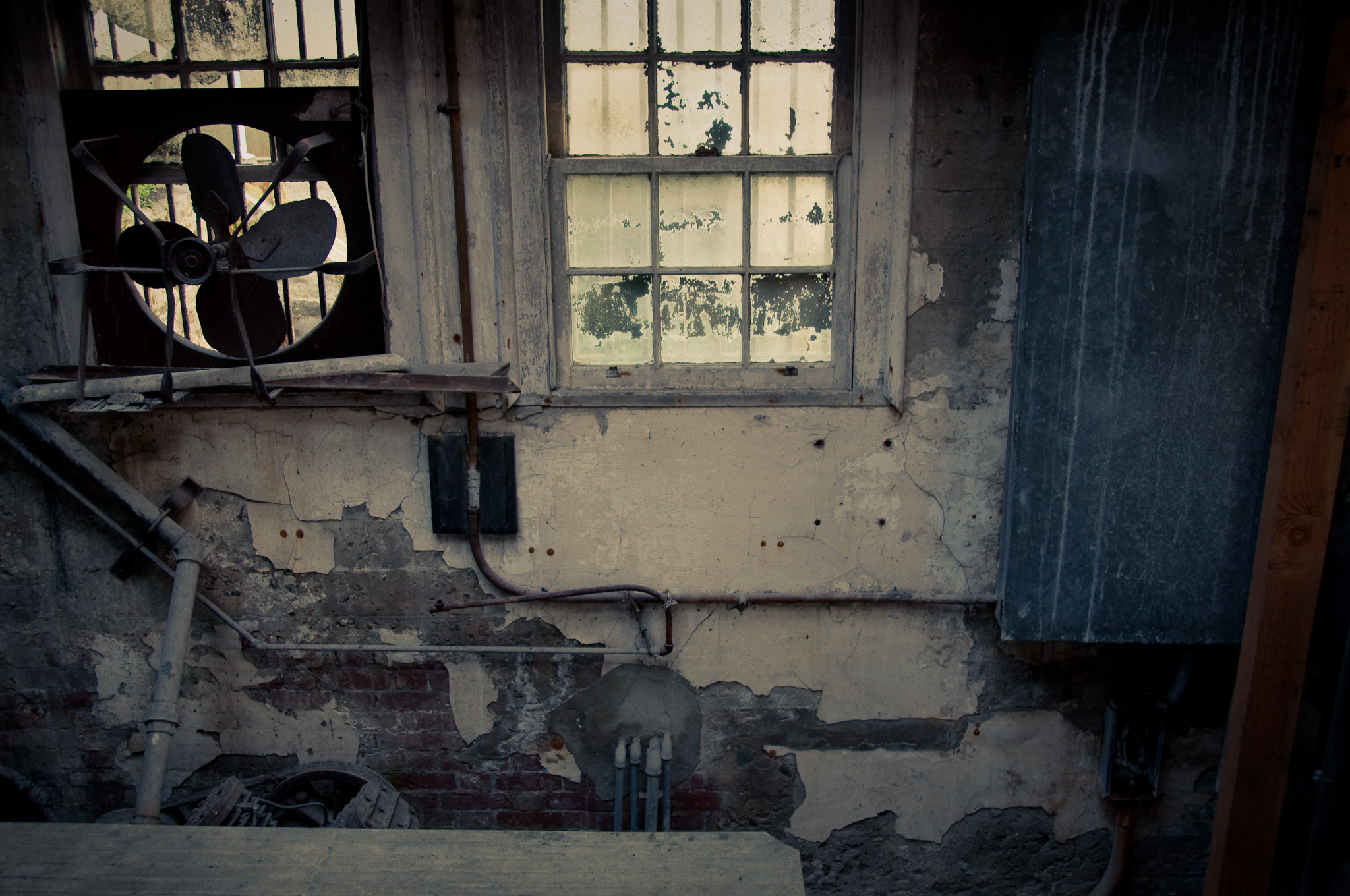
Interior

== Use ==
The morgue was only documented to have been used once when a deceased prisoner was stored in it overnight, having missed the last boat run to the mainland of the day. The examination table was never used to conduct an autopsy.

During its use by the U.S. Army, deceased officers were originally taken to Angel Island and military cemetery on Angel Island, but after its closure in the early 1900s, officers would then be taken to the San Francisco National Cemetery in the Presidio of San Francisco. During Alcatraz's use as a Federal penitentiary from 1934 to 1963, deceased inmates were taken to the San Francisco County Coroner on the mainland.

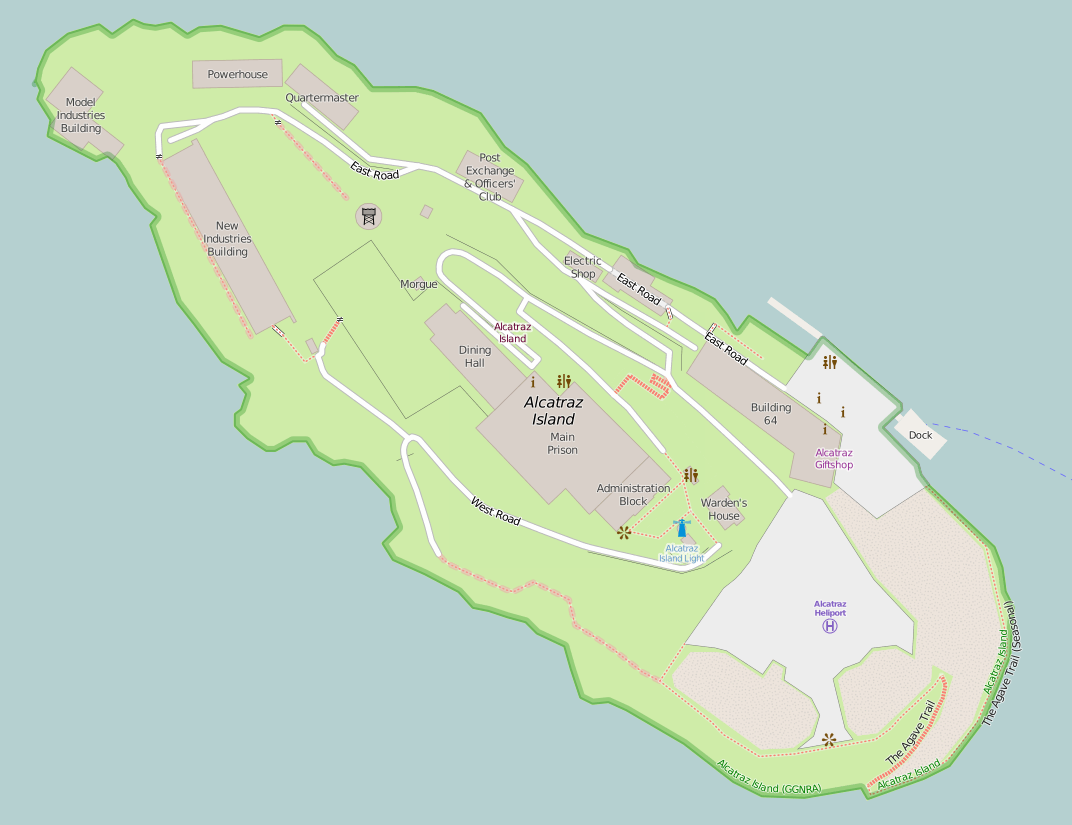
The morgue is labelled on the map of Alcatraz
