= Recreation Yard (Alcatraz) =

Prison yard in San Francisco, California, US

Coordinates: 37°49′37″N 122°25′25″W

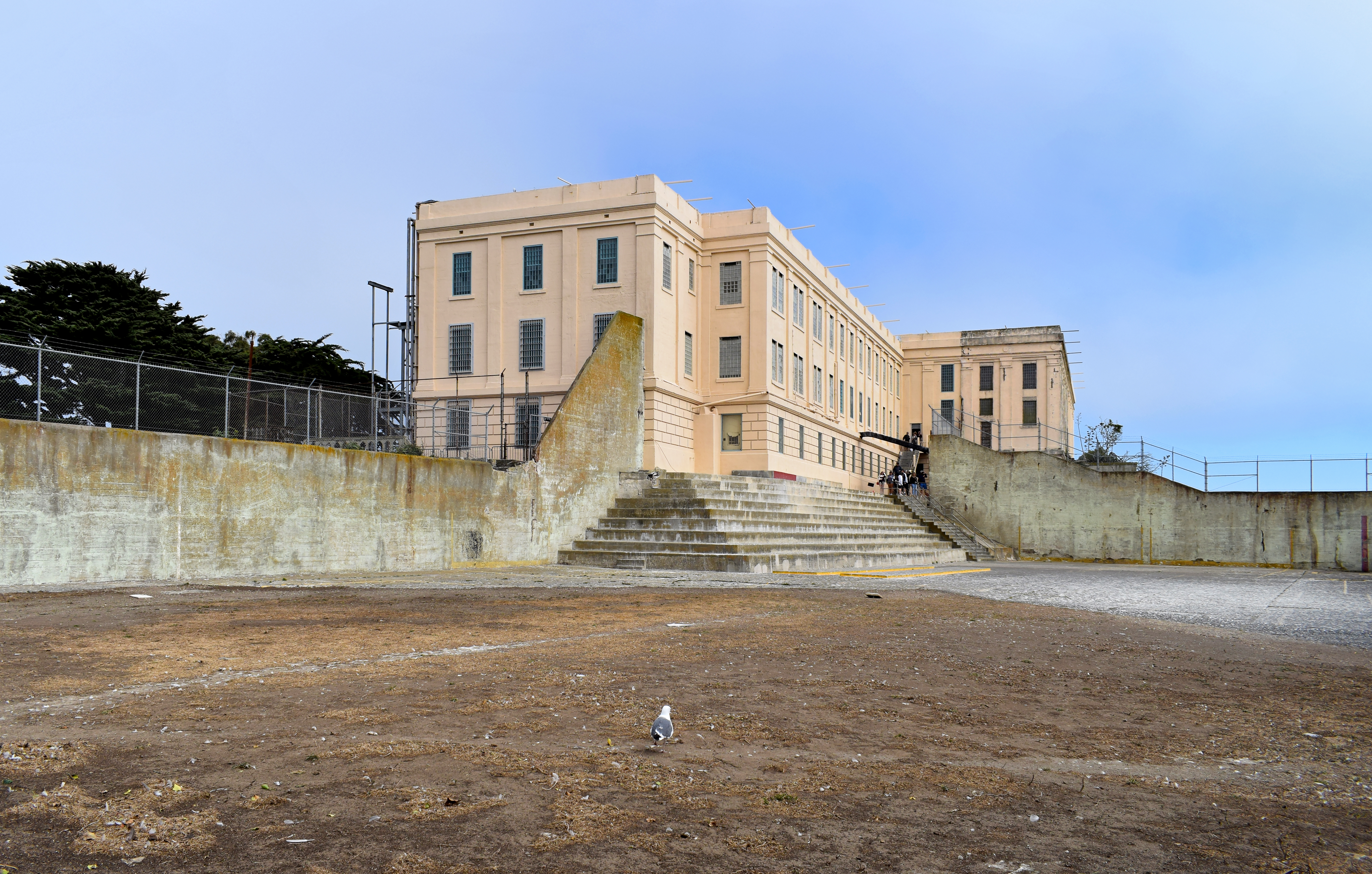
Alcatraz recreation yard

The Recreation Yard was the yard used by inmates of Alcatraz Federal Penitentiary between 1934 and 1963. It is located adjacent to the Dining Hall northwest of the end of D-Block on a raised level surrounded by a high wall and fence above it. Guard Tower #3 lay just to the west of the yard. The gun gallery was situated in the yard, mounted on one of the dining hall's exterior walls. The recreation yard did face the mainland.

== History ==
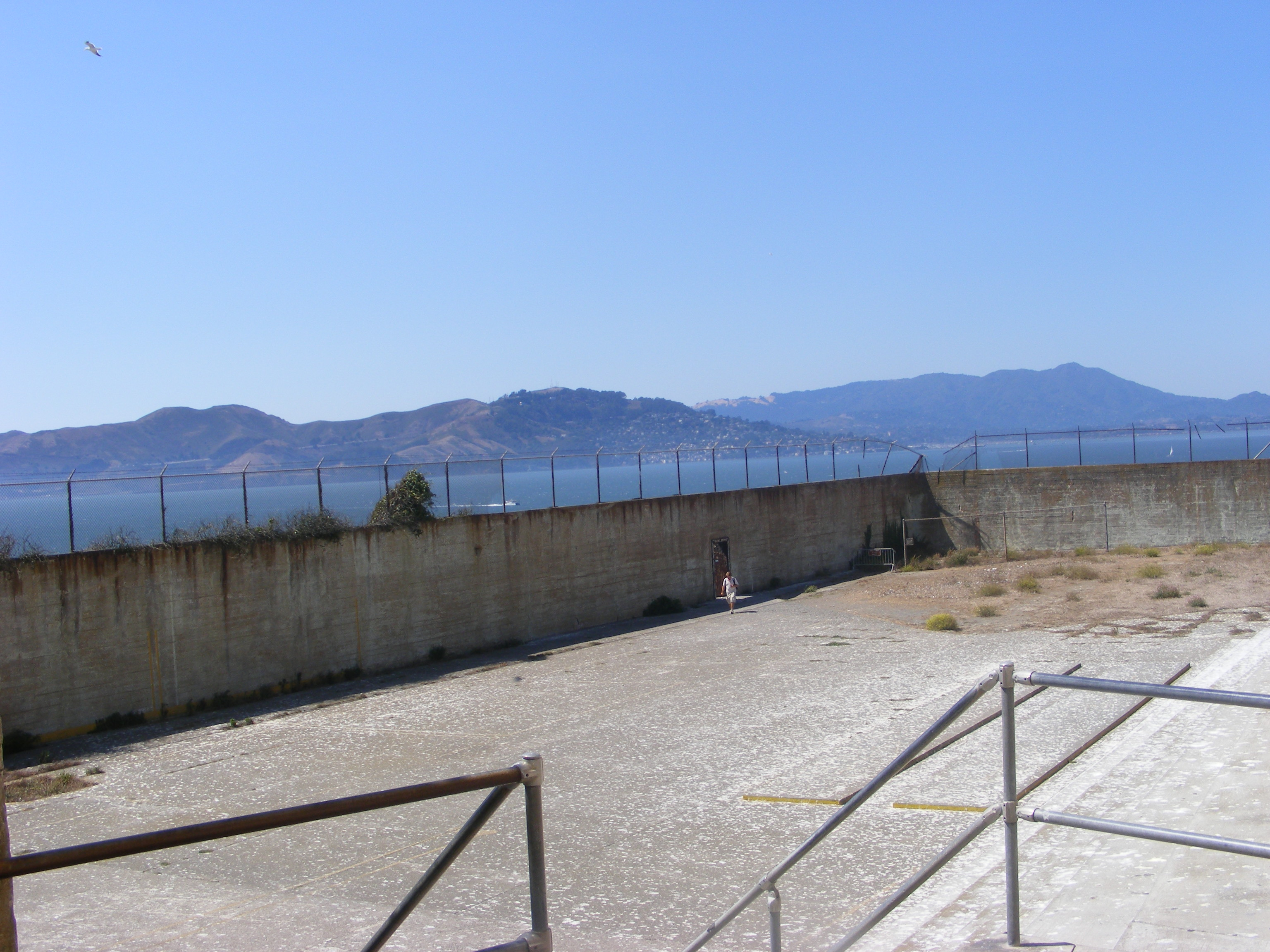
The Alcatraz recreation yard.

In 1936, the previously dirt-covered yard was paved. The yard was part of the most violent escape attempt from Alcatraz in May 1946 when a group of inmates hatched a plot to obtain the key into the recreation yard, kill the tower guards, take hostages, and use them as shields to reach the dock. During the Occupation of Alcatraz in 1970, between 400 and 700 Native Indians assembled in the recreation yard and demonstrated.

== Terms ==
Inmates were permitted out into the yard on Saturdays, Sundays and on holidays for a maximum of 5 hours. Inmates who worked seven days a week in the kitchen were rewarded with short yard breaks during the weekdays. Badly behaved prisoners were liable to having their yard access rights taken away from them on weekends.

== Social interaction ==
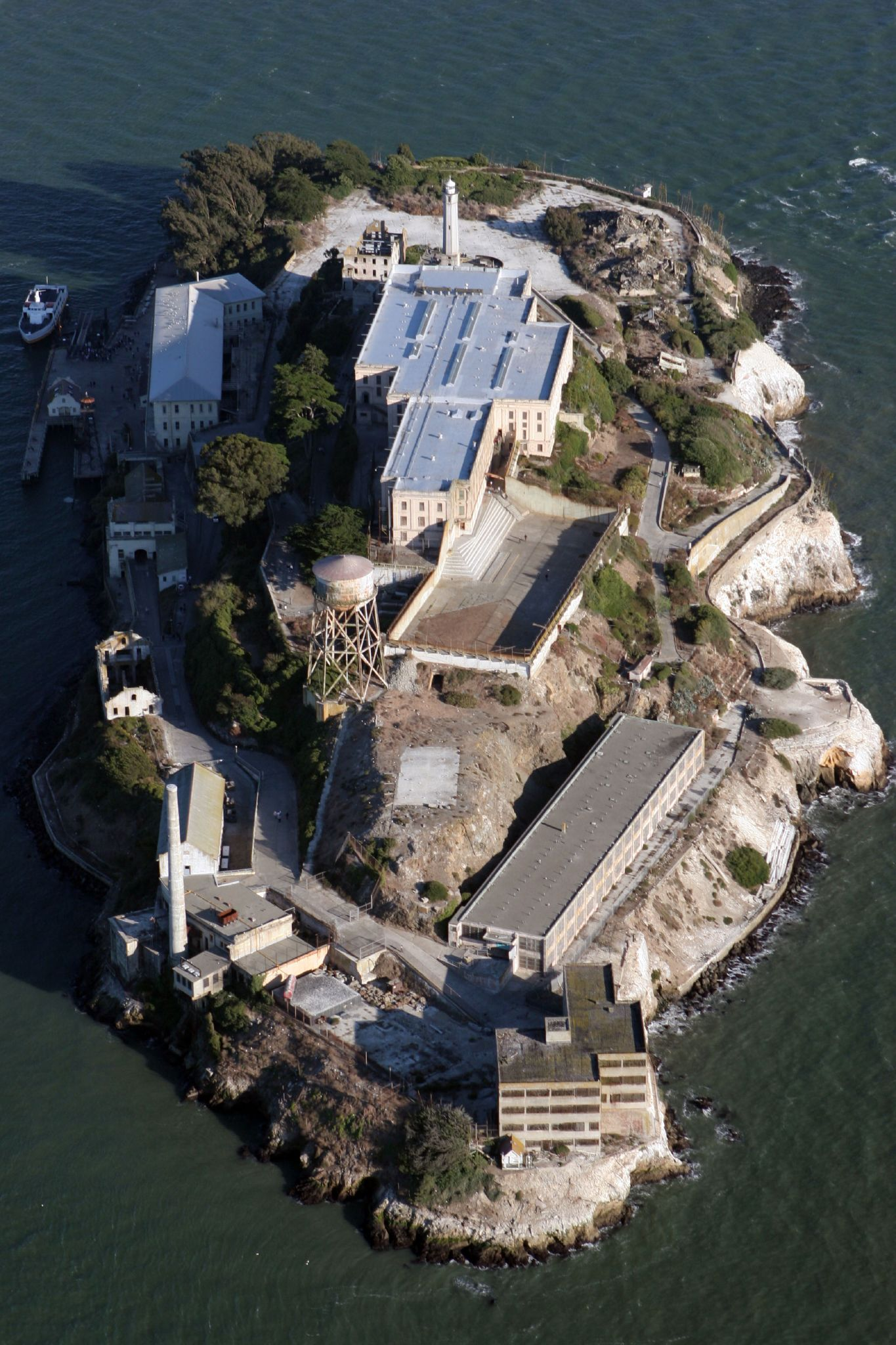
Aerial view showing the main cellblock, dining hall area, and the yard in front of it and just to the right.

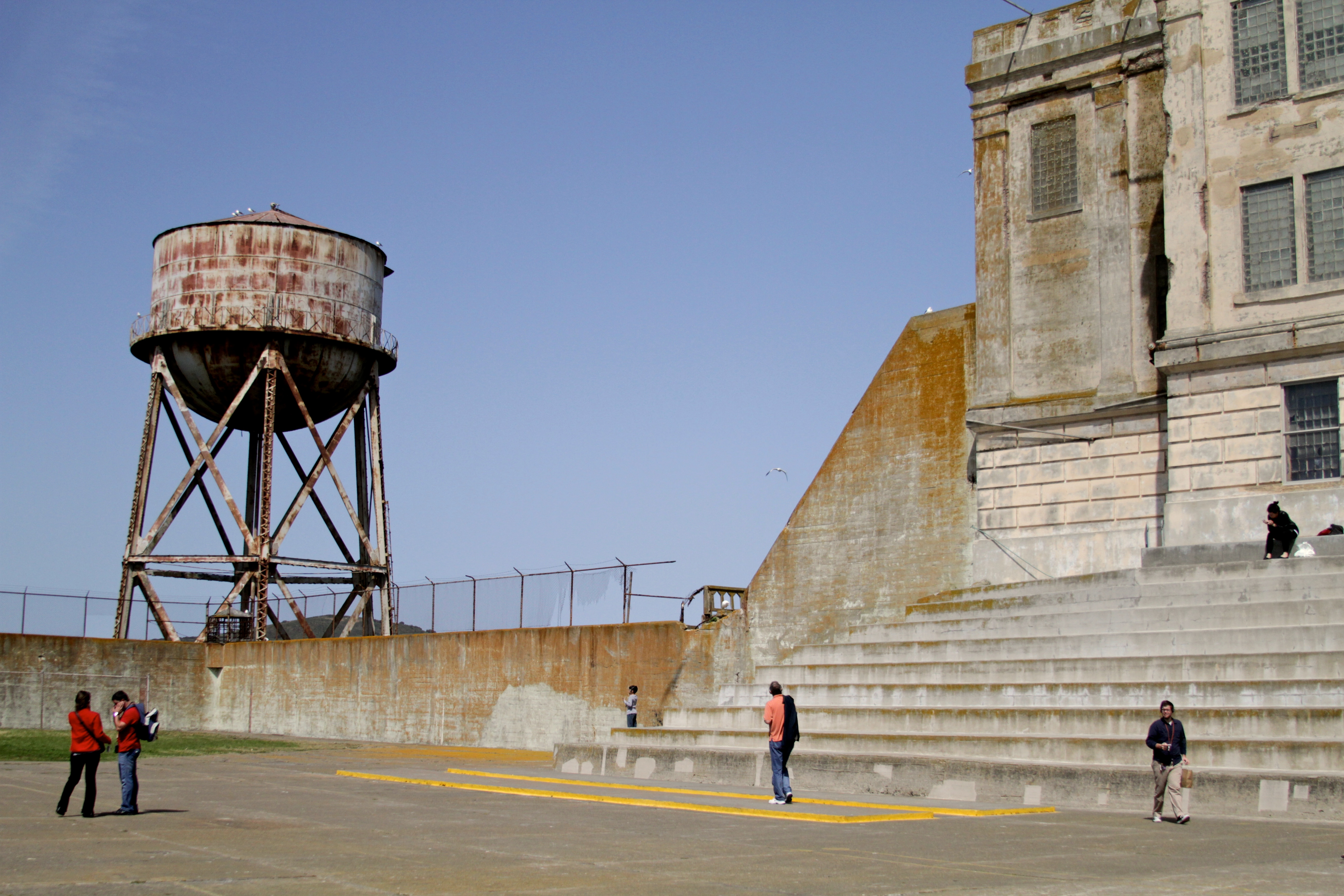
View of the water tower from the yard

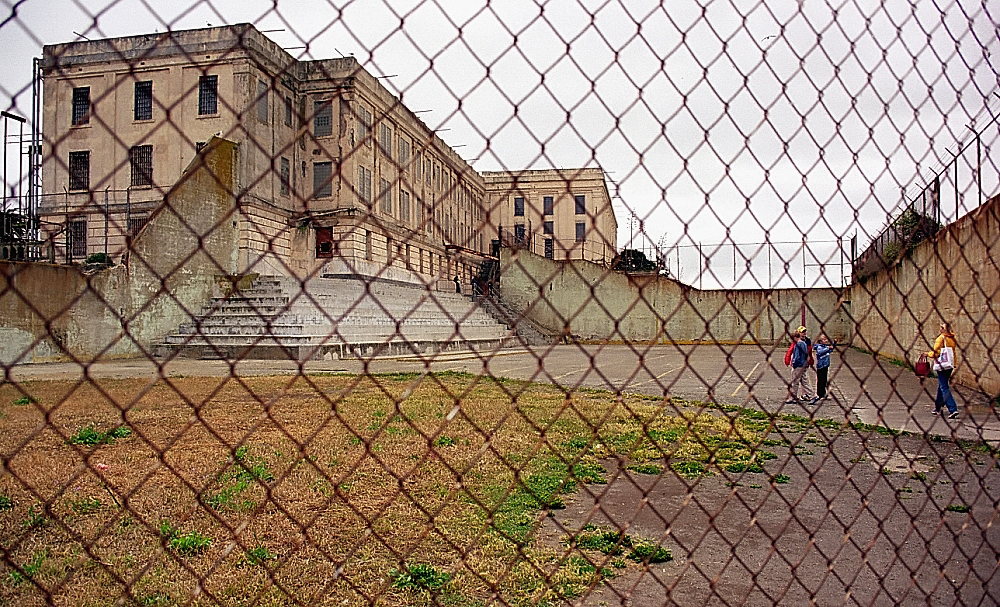
Looking through the fence into the yard

The prisoners of Alcatraz were permitted to play games such as baseball, softball and other sports at these times, and intellectual games such as chess. Basketball also appears to have been played on the yard judging by the markings which are still visible on the yard today. Baseball and softball were the most popular. Because of the small size of the yard and the diamond at the end of it, a section of the wall behind the first base had to be padded to cushion the impact of inmates overrunning it.

Inmates were provided gloves, bats, and balls, but no sport uniforms. In 1938, there were four amateur teams, the Bees, Oaks, Oilers, and Seals, named after Minor League clubs, and four league teams named after Major League clubs, the Cardinals, Cubs, Giants, and Tigers.

Bank robber and kidnapper Volney Davis was a pitching ace for the Oilers, while Lorenzo Murrietta, doing 40 years for assault and robbery, was the best batter in Alcatraz league play. He had a .402 batting average, with 9 home runs and 45 RBIs for the Cardinals.

Although many of the inmates relished the opportunity to exercise on weekends, violence occasionally occurred, often race related. A notable riot occurred on May 20, 1956, over racial taunts on the diamond between a white and black prisoner during a softball match.

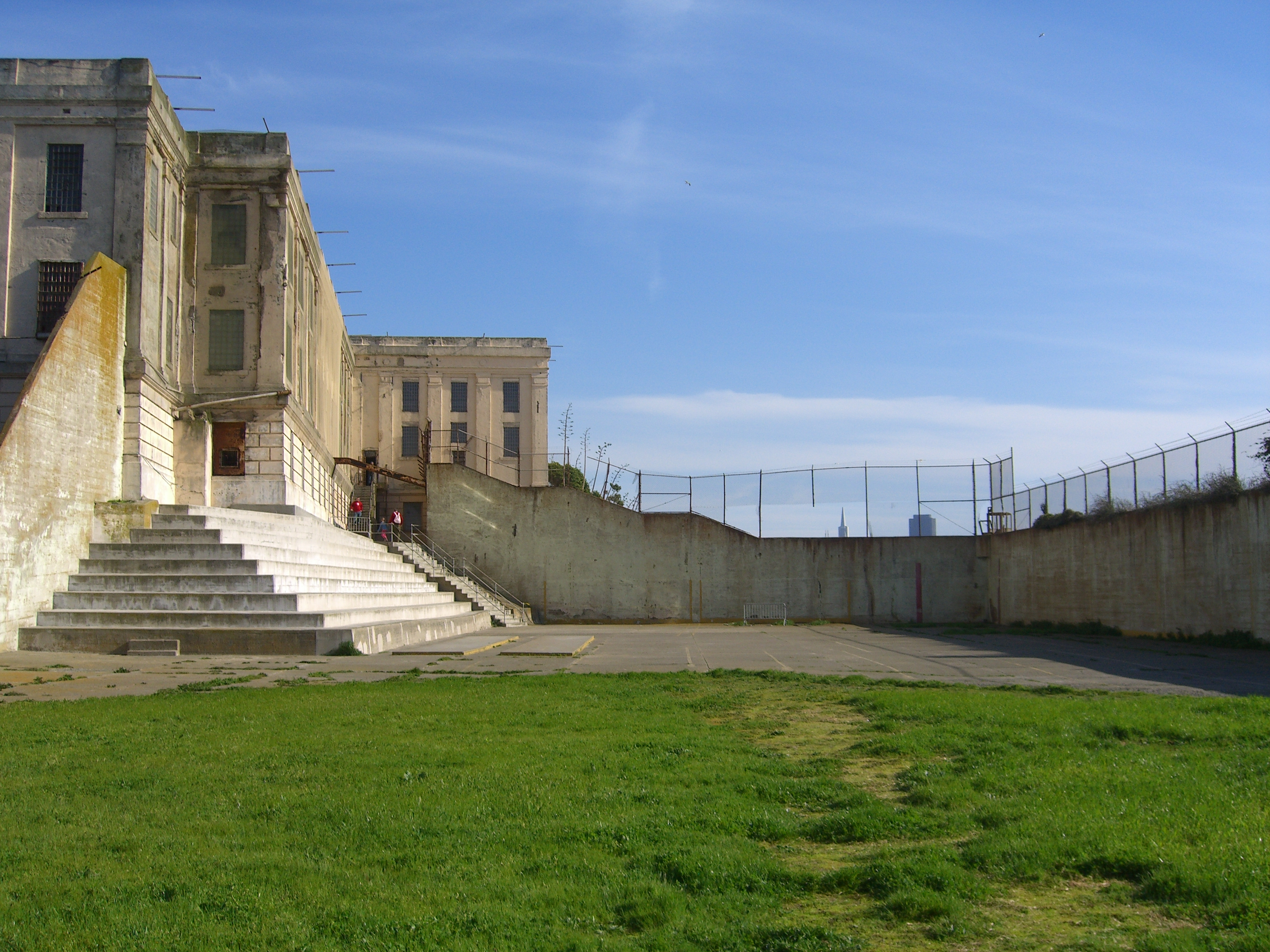
The view from the diamond

Many of the inmates used weekends in the yards to converse with each other and discuss crime, the only real opportunities they had during the week for active conversation. Machine Gun Kelly and Basil "The Owl" Banghart were said to be inseparable in the yard and would spend their whole time walking around it in conversation together. Al Capone avoided the yard in his later years in the penitentiary as his mind deteriorated. Edwin B. Swope, Warden of Alcatraz from 1948 to 1955, once said, in response to an inmate who complained to him on the yard about his term of 199 years, which was really a life sentence, "My boy, we're all doing life. Every one of us is doing life."

== In popular culture ==
The Alcatraz recreation yard has been a setting for scenes in numerous films and novels. Scenes have featured prison inmates hatching schemes or being involved in bloody conflicts. The yard featured several times in the 1979 Clint Eastwood film Escape from Alcatraz including a violent fight; it was parodied in the 1994 Leslie Nielsen film, Naked Gun 33 1/3: The Final Insult.
