= Frank J. Hennessy =

American politician (1880–1957)

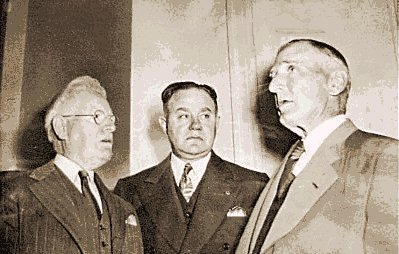
- From left to right: Warden James A. Johnston of Alcatraz Federal Penitentiary, Associate Warden Edward J. Miller, and District Attorney Frank J. Hennessy

United States Attorney for the Northern District of California
- In office 1937–1951
- Appointed by: Franklin D. Roosevelt; Harry S. Truman

Personal details
- Born: November 19, 1880 Nebraska, U.S.
- Died: March 18, 1957 (aged 76) Los Altos, California, U.S.
- Spouse: Maude Rose Hennessy
- Education: University of California

Frank James Hennessy (November 19, 1880 – March 18, 1957) was an American politician and lawyer, best known for being United States Attorney for the Northern District of California in the 1940s and early 1950s. His office was located in the San Francisco Post Office Building on 7th and Mission Streets. In the late 1940s, he was often involved in the affairs of Alcatraz Island, working with its first warden James A. Johnston on legal matters surrounding the controversial prison institution. He was the son of William Pope Hennessy, who was a tax commissioner for the Union Pacific Railroad. Hennessy was a University of California graduate and was married to Maude. He died in 1957 after a long illness; he was 76.
