= United States Attorney for the Northern District of California =

U.S. Attorney's Office for the Northern District of California
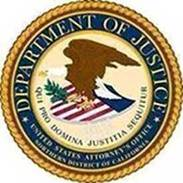

Agency overview
- Jurisdiction: Northern District of California
- Agency executive: Patrick D. Robbins, United States Attorney
- Website: justice.gov/usao-ndca

Map
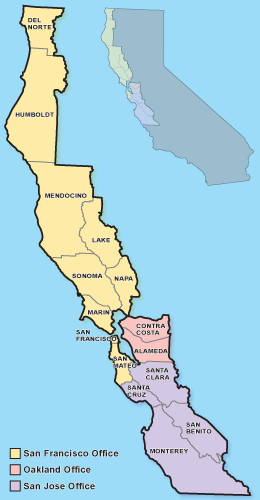
- Northern District of California

The United States attorney for the Northern District of California is responsible for representing the federal government in the United States District Court for the Northern District of California.

The Northern District of California encompasses 15 Northern California counties from Del Norte in the north to Monterey in the south. The District contains three major metropolitan areas in San Francisco, Oakland, and San Jose; and an expanse of suburban and rural area.

The United States Attorney’s Office prosecutes violations of federal law and represents the United States in civil litigation in the District. The Assistant United States Attorneys (“AUSAs”) who work in the U.S. Attorney's Office prosecute criminal violations, defend civil lawsuits against the United States, and litigate actions to collect judgments and restitution on behalf of victims and taxpayers.

As of February 12, 2025 the United States attorney is Patrick Robbins.

The United States Attorney's Office for the Northern District of California has offices in San Francisco, Oakland, and San Jose.

== Divisions ==
- Criminal Division: Responsible for prosecutions of federal crimes, including bank and bankruptcy fraud; consumer, elder, government, and health care fraud; child exploitation and human trafficking; civil rights; criminal immigration; cybercrimes; environmental crimes; national security; narcotics; public corruption; securities fraud; tax; trade secrets theft; and violent crimes. Sections within the Criminal Division are: Appellate; Asset Forfeiture; General Crimes; Corporate Fraud Strike Force; Organized Crime Drug Enforcement Task Force (OCDETF); Organized Crime Strike Force; Special Prosecutions.
- Civil Division: Responsible for representing the United States in civil suits. The Civil Division includes Civil Defensive, Affirmative Civil Enforcement, and the Financial Litigation Unit.
- Administrative Division: Responsible for providing a full range of office support and employee services.

== Formed ==
The U.S. Attorney’s Office was formed by Act of September 28, 1850, Chap. 86, P.L. 81-36, 9 Stat. 521.

== Historical list of U.S. Attorneys for the Northern District of California ==
U.S. Attorney	Type of Appointment	Date of Commission
Calhoun Benham	Presidential	September 28, 1850
Samuel W. Inge	Presidential	April 1, 1853
William Blanding	Presidential	July 15, 1856
Peter Della Torre	Recess	May 19, 1857
Peter Della Torre	Presidential	May 11, 1858
Calhoun Benham	Presidential	May 11, 1860
William H. Sharp	Recess	April 9, 1861
William H. Sharp	Presidential	July 22, 1861
Delos Lake	Presidential	August or September 1864
F.M. Pixley	Recess	May 11, 1868
Lorenzo D. Latimer	Presidential	December 21, 1869
Walter Van Dyke	Presidential	December 18, 1873
John M. Coghlan	Presidential	April 19, 1876
Philip Teare	Presidential	June 15, 1878
Samuel G. Hilborn	Presidential	January 4, 1883
John T. Carey	Recess	November 20, 1886
John T. Carey	Presidential	January 13, 1887
Charles A. Garter	Recess	October 14, 1890
Charles A. Garter	Presidential	December 11, 1890
Samuel Knight	Court	December 11, 1894
Henry S. Foote	Presidential	February 20, 1895
Frank L. Coombs	Presidential	February 14, 1899
Marshall B. Woodworth	Presidential	March 2, 1901
Robert T. Devlin	Presidential	March 8, 1905
Robert T. Devlin	Presidential	April 25, 1910
John L. McNab	Presidential	April 9, 1912
Benjamin L. McKinley	Court	June 26, 1913
Annette Abbott Adams	Court	July 25, 1913
John W. Preston	Presidential	December 22, 1913
John W. Preston	Presidential	January 8, 1918
Annette Abbott Adams	Presidential	August 5, 1919
Frank M. Silva	Recess	June 10, 1920
Frank M. Silva	Court	March 7, 1921
J.T. Williams	Recess	August 27, 1921
J.T. Williams	Presidential	September 27, 1921
Sterling Carr	Court	July 11, 1924
George J. Hatfield	Recess	September 26, 1925
George J. Hatfield	Presidential	December 14, 1925
George J. Hatfield	Presidential	December 18, 1929
I.M. Peckham	Court	January 3, 1933
Henry H. McPike	Presidential	May 13, 1933
Frank J. Hennessy	Presidential	August 14, 1937
Frank J. Hennessy	Presidential	July 25, 1940
Frank J. Hennessy	Presidential	November 7, 1941
Chauncey F. Tramutolo	Presidential	April 19, 1951
Lloyd H. Burke	Presidential	April 16, 1953
Lloyd H. Burke	Presidential	May 24, 1957
Robert H. Schnacke	Court	August 6, 1958
Robert H. Schnacke	Presidential	August 8, 1958
Lynn J. Gillard	Court	June 1, 1959
Lynn J. Gillard	Presidential	August 29, 1959
Lawrence E. Dayton	Presidential	May 19, 1960
Cecil F. Poole	Presidential	June 28, 1961
Cecil F. Poole	Presidential	June 9, 1966
James L. Browning, Jr.	Presidential	December 24, 1969
James L. Browning, Jr.	Presidential	May 21, 1974
G. William Hunter	Presidential	November 7, 1977
Rodney H. Hamblin	Court	October 1, 1981
Joseph P. Russoniello	Presidential	January 6, 1982
Joseph P. Russoniello	Presidential	November 5, 1986
William T. McGivern, Jr.	Attorney General	March 17, 1990
William T. McGivern, Jr.	Court	July 15, 1990
John A. Mendez	Attorney General	August 10, 1992
John A. Mendez	Court	December 7, 1992
Michael J. Yamaguchi	Attorney General	July 4, 1993
Michael J. Yamaguchi	Presidential	October 27, 1993
Robert S. Mueller, III	Attorney General	August 24, 1998
Robert S. Mueller, III	Court	December 21, 1998
Robert S. Mueller, III	Presidential	October 13, 1999
David W. Shapiro	Attorney General	September 4, 2001
David W. Shapiro	Court	January 2, 2002
Kevin V. Ryan	Attorney General	July 16, 2002
Kevin V. Ryan	Presidential	August 2, 2002
Scott N. Schools	Attorney General	February 17, 2007
Scott N. Schools	Court	October 13, 2007
Joseph P. Russoniello	Presidential	January 4, 2008
Melinda Haag	Presidential	August 13, 2010
Brian J. Stretch	Acting (Vacancies Reform Act)	September 1, 2015
Brian J. Stretch	Attorney General	March 30, 2016
Brian J. Stretch	Court	July 26, 2016
Alex Tse	Acting (Vacancies Reform Act)	January 7, 2018
Alex Tse	Court	August 5, 2018
David L. Anderson	Presidential	January 15, 2019
Stephanie Hinds	Acting (Vacancies Reform Act)	March 1, 2021
Stephanie Hinds	Attorney General	December 26, 2021
Ismail Ramsey	Presidential	March 21, 2023
Patrick D Robbins	Acting (Vacancies Reform Act)	February 13, 2025
