= Melinda Haag =

American lawyer (born 1961)

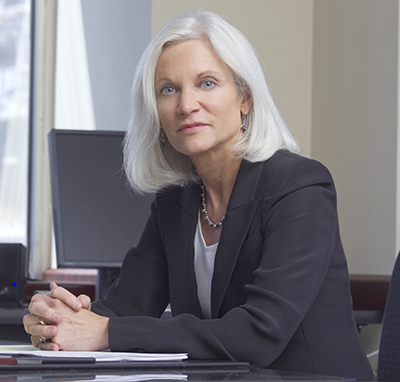

United States Attorney for the Northern District of California
- In office 2010–2016
- President: Barack Obama
- Preceded by: Joseph Russoniello
- Succeeded by: David L. Anderson

Personal details
- Born: 1961 (age 64–65) San Diego, California, U.S.
- Party: Democratic
- Education: University of California, San Diego (BA); University of California, Berkeley (JD)

Melinda L. Haag (born 1961) is an American litigator and former U.S. Attorney for the Northern District of California.

== Early life and education ==
In 1983, Haag graduated from the University of California, San Diego with a bachelor's degree in political science. In 1987, she received her Juris Doctor degree from the University of California, Berkeley School of Law.

== Career ==
Melinda Haag spent 14 years in private law practice and nine years as a federal prosecutor in Los Angeles and San Francisco prior to her appointment as U.S. Attorney in 2010. From 1989-1993, she served in the U.S. Attorney's Office in Los Angeles and then went into private practice at the San Francisco firm Landels Ripley & Diamond. She joined the U.S. Attorney's Office in San Francisco in 1999 before joining the San Francisco office of Orrick, Herrington & Sutcliffe.

In August 2010, Haag was appointed to the Northern District of California U.S. Attorney's Office by President Barack Obama and unanimously confirmed without debate by the United States Senate. Her appointment marked the first time in 90 years that a female U.S. Attorney represented the district. She served in that position for five years, stepping down in September 2015.

Haag served as co-chair of the White Collar Crime Subcommittee of the Attorney General’s Advisory Committee and was a member of the Cybersecurity and Health Care Fraud Subcommittees, where she collaborated with U.S. Attorneys nationwide on the development and implementation of national policies and practices regarding the government's approach to economic crimes and cybersecurity.

On January 13, 2016, Orrick, Herrington & Sutcliffe announced that Melinda Haag would be rejoining the firm as head of its Global Litigation Practice beginning on March 1, 2016. In January 2021, she joined Paul Weiss as a partner.

== Closures of medical marijuana dispensaries ==
A controversial issue during Haag's term involved federal actions against medical cannabis suppliers when she authorized her office to file complaints against several landlords that allowed their properties to be used for the distribution of marijuana by medical marijuana dispensaries. Marijuana advocates claimed the complaints were part of a campaign Haag waged against medical marijuana operations in California, despite assurances from President Obama and Attorney General Eric Holder that distribution operations operating in compliance with state law would not be targeted by the Department of Justice.

In an interview with KQED's Michael Montgomery, Haag cited concerns from constituents about the negative impact the marijuana industry was having in their communities. "Marijuana is illegal under federal law and I felt like I had to do something to respond to those members of my community that don't support it and don't support the impact they believe it's having," said Haag.
