= Edward J. Miller (warden) =

American prison warden

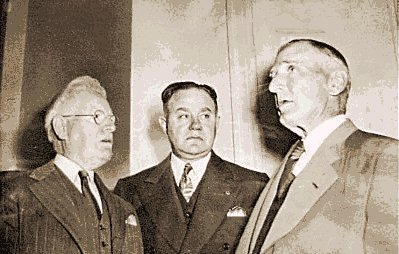
- From left to right: Warden James A. Johnston, Associate Warden E. J. Miller, District Attorney Frank J. Hennessy

Associate Warden, Alcatraz Federal Penitentiary
- In office 1937–1947

Personal details
- Born: Edward Joseph Miller; May 7, 1898 Leavenworth, Kansas
- Died: December 13, 1959 (aged 61) Leavenworth, Kansas
- Occupation: Federal Bureau of Prisons administrator

Edward Joe Miller (May 7, 1898 – December 13, 1959), also known as E. J. Miller, was an American prison administrator. A native of Kansas, he was the second Associate Warden of Alcatraz Federal Penitentiary under James A. Johnston in the late 1930s and 1940s. Both men were known for their strict discipline.

Miller arrived on Alcatraz on June 23, 1934, as a correctional officer. By the end of the decade, he was promoted to Associate Warden. Miller was Associate Warden during numerous escape attempts at Alcatraz.

He was once challenged by Henri Young, who complained to Miller that the Alcatraz rules which he and Johnston insisted upon were violations of federal Bureau of Prisons guidelines. Miller responded, “You don't run Alcatraz. I run Alcatraz." Later he refused to give Young a Bible when he was in solitary confinement in D-Block.

In 1947, Miller was transferred to Leavenworth.

Miller was married to Rosine (née Wahler). They lived on Alcatraz during his time as Associate Warden there, as did other families of guards.
