= Scott Schools =

American lawyer

Scott Newton Schools

Associate Deputy Attorney General
- In office 2016 – July 6, 2018
- Preceded by: David Margolis
- Succeeded by: Bradley Weinsheimer

Scott Newton Schools is an American lawyer and the chief compliance officer of OpenAI. Schools previously served as the chief ethics and compliance officer of Uber. Before joining Uber, Schools was the highest-ranking career civil servant at the United States Department of Justice, serving as associate deputy attorney general. He has been characterized as “the most important unknown person in D.C.”

It has been reported that Schools was a significant advisor to top political officials Sally Yates and Rod Rosenstein, and made a significant recommendation to dismiss James Comey.

Earlier in his career, Schools had served as U.S. Attorney for South Carolina and U.S. Attorney for the Northern District of California.

In 2018, Schools was replaced by Bradley Weinsheimer, who now serves as DoJ's highest ranking career civil servant.
