= Warden's House (Alcatraz Island) =

Building

Coordinates: 37°49′34″N 122°25′19″W

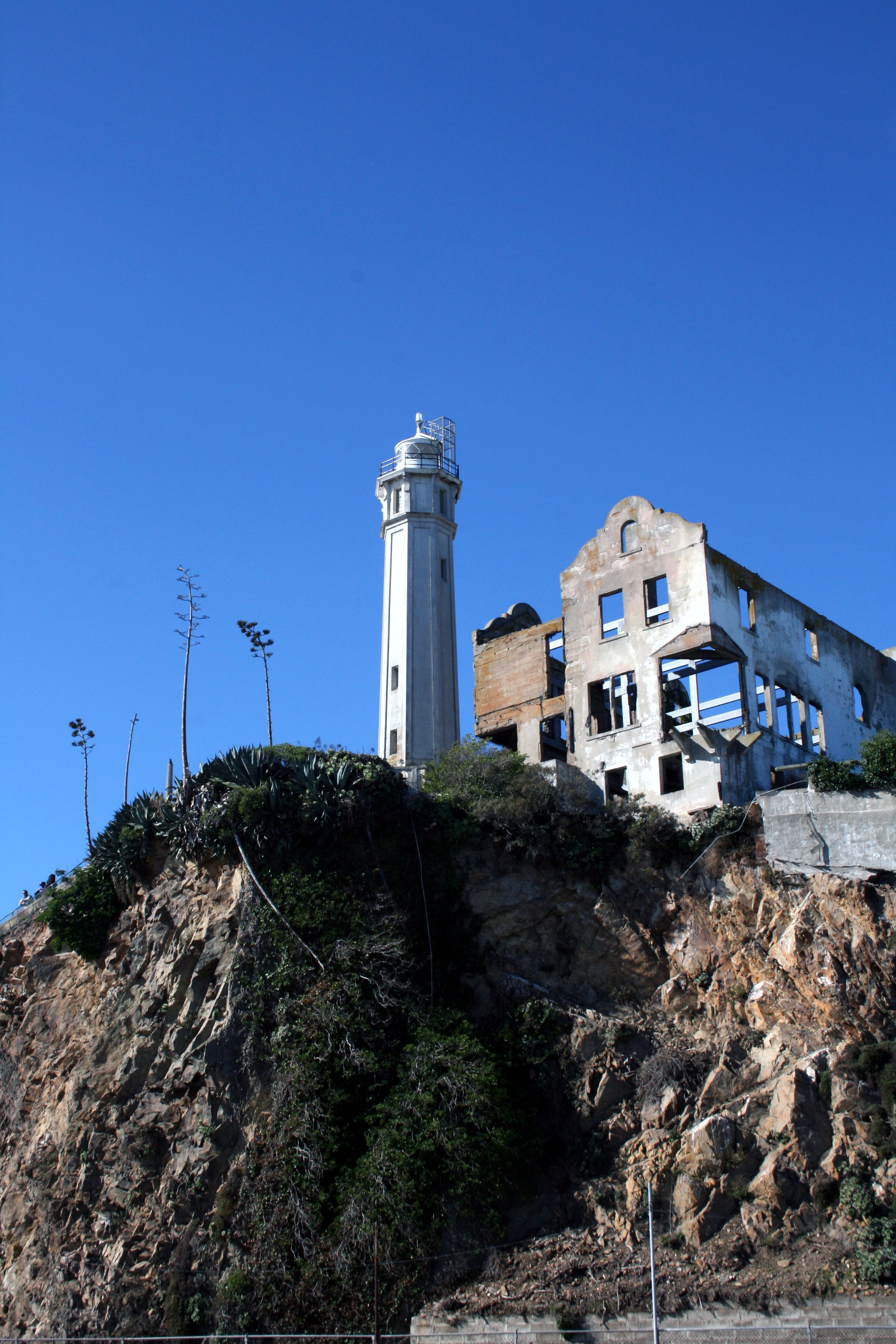
Warden's House and lighthouse

The Warden's House was the home of the wardens of the federal penitentiary on Alcatraz Island, off San Francisco. It is located at the southeastern end of the Main Cellblock, next to Alcatraz Lighthouse. The 3-floor, 15-room mansion was built in 1921 according to a Golden Gate National Recreation Area signpost, although some sources say it was built in 1926 or 1929 and had 17 or 18 rooms.

After Alcatraz was converted into a federal penitentiary, between 1934 and 1963 the four wardens of Alcatraz resided here including the first warden, James A. Johnston. A house of luxury in stark contrast to the jail next to it, the wardens often held lavish cocktail parties here. The signpost at the spot shows a photograph of a trusted inmate doing chores at the house for the warden and that the house had a terraced garden and greenhouse. The mansion had tall windows, providing fine views of San Francisco Bay.

Today the house is a ruin, burnt during the AIM (American Indian Movement) Occupation of Alcatraz on June 1, 1970. AIM tried to put out the flames, but a bucket brigade was inadequate.

The Warden's House had a greenhouse. Working there and getting access was a mark of trust and approval for an inmate.

The slope below the Warden's House has been the subject of structural remediation as it was deteriorating.

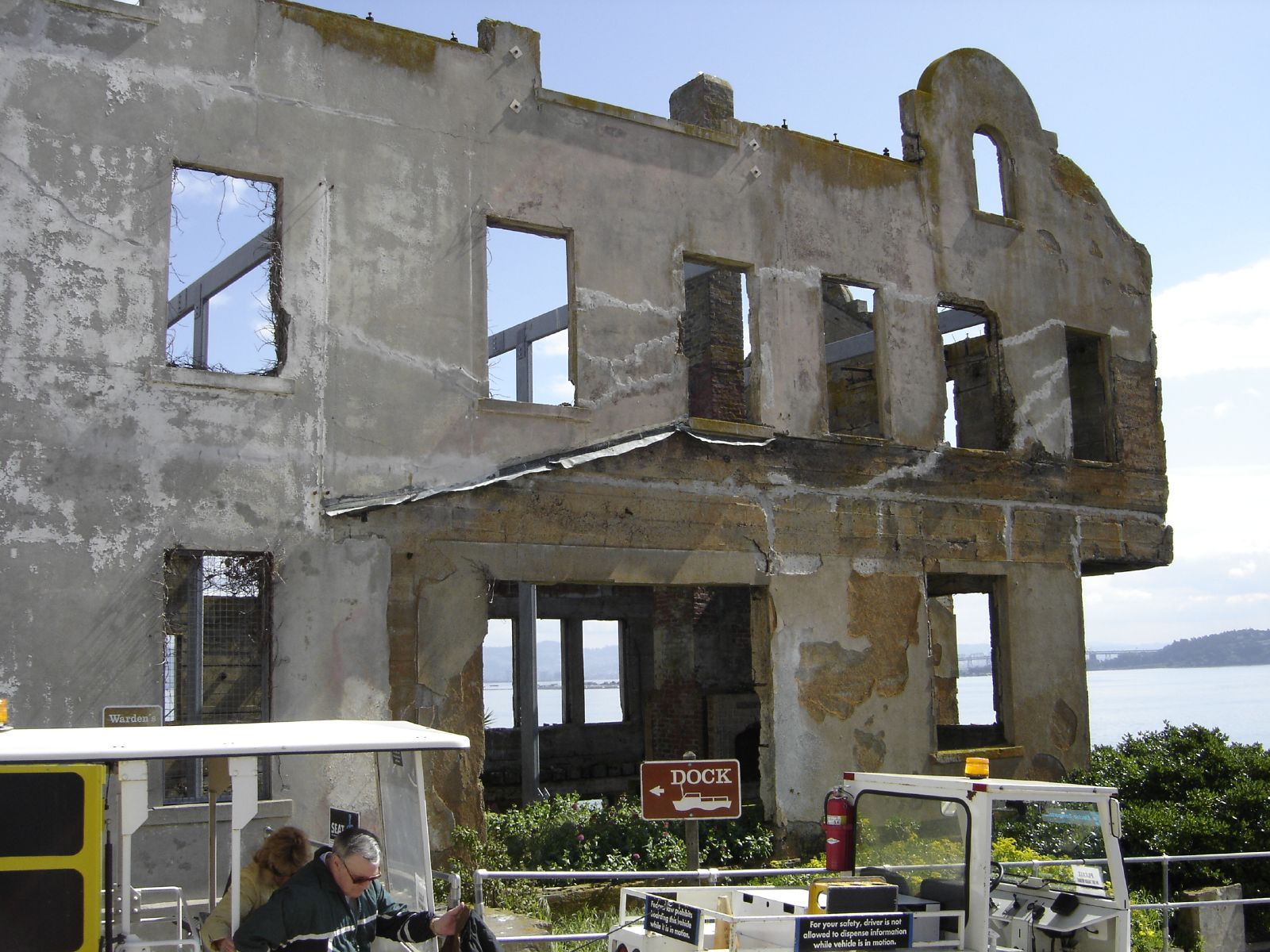

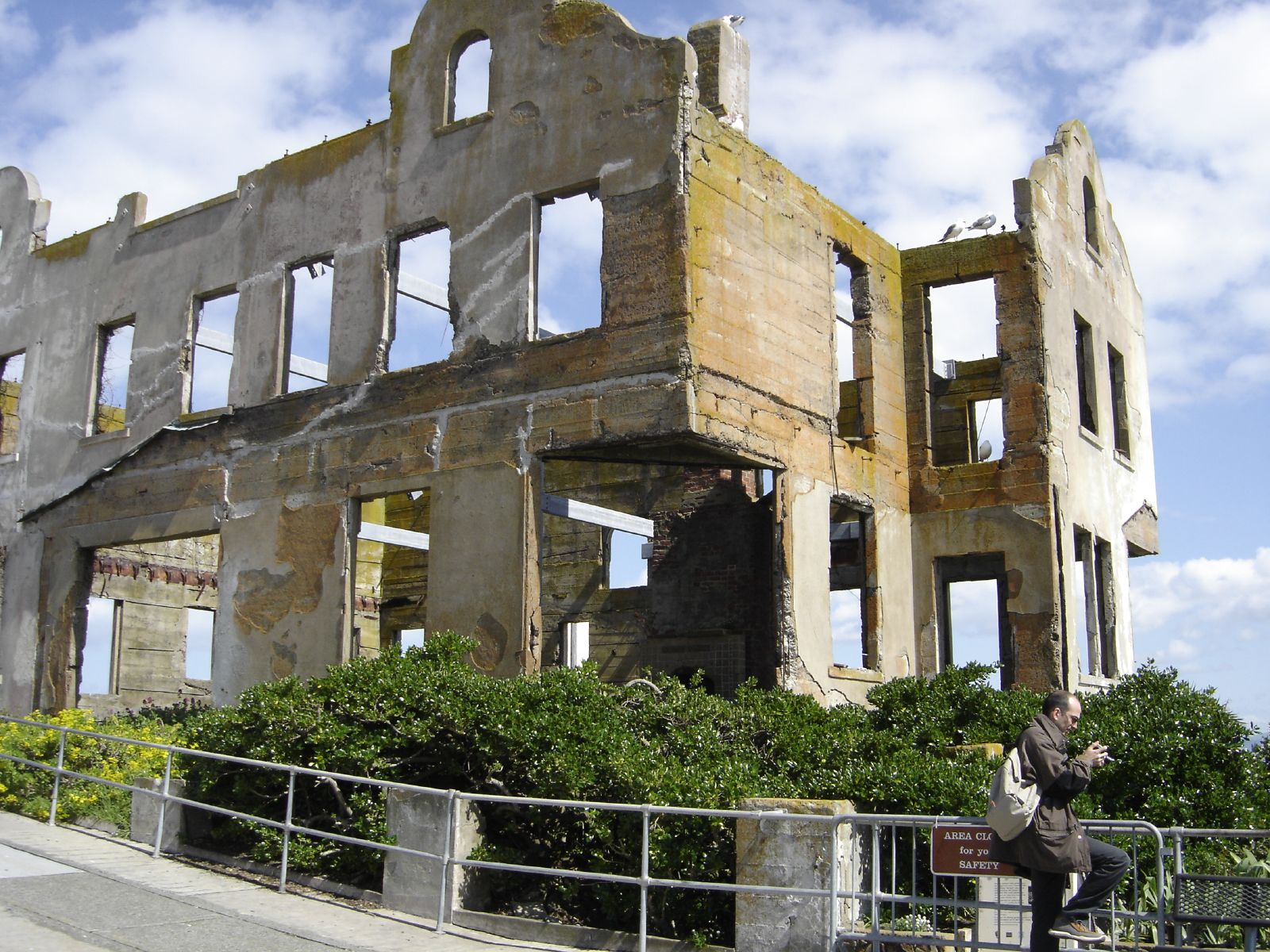

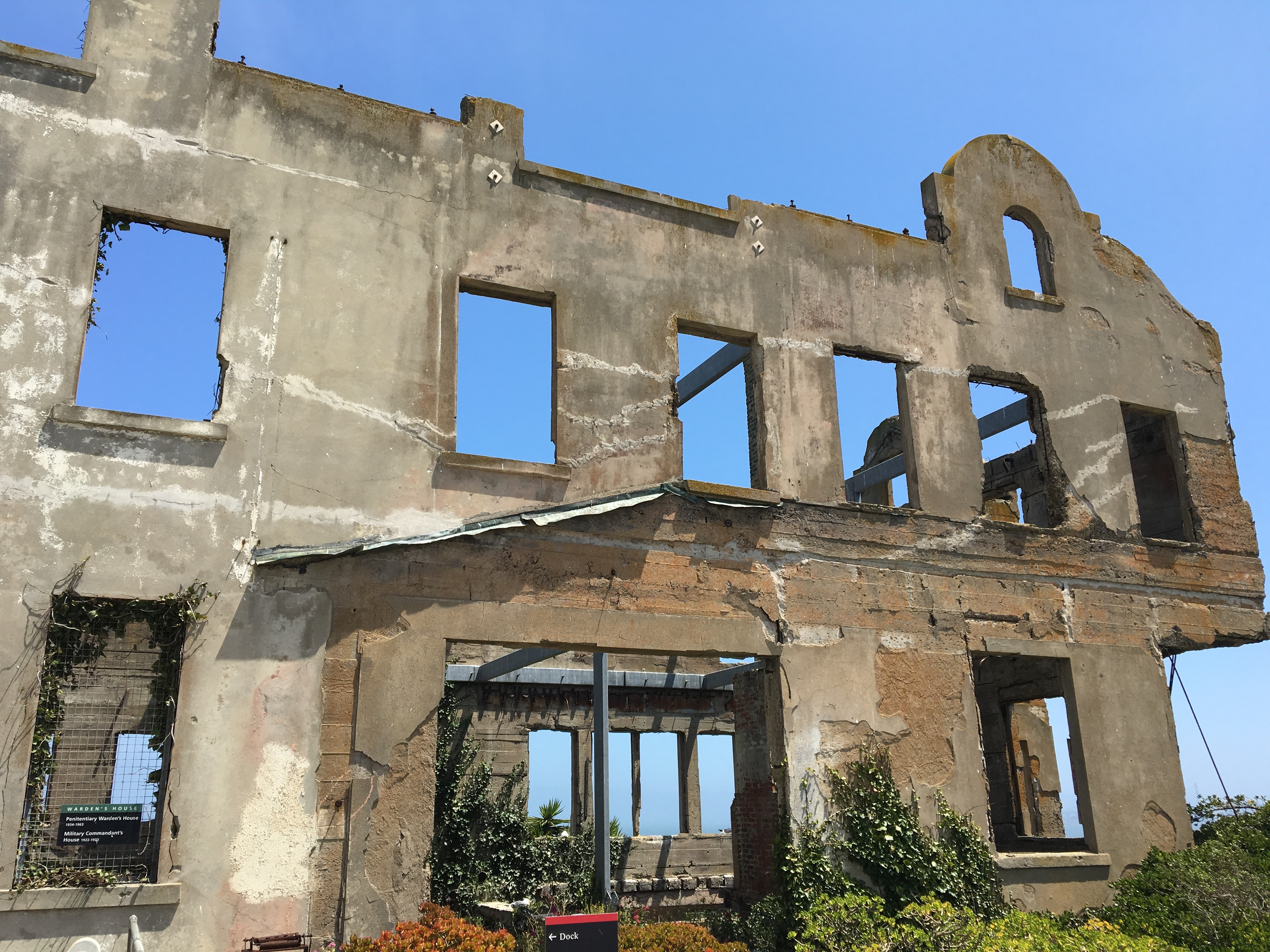

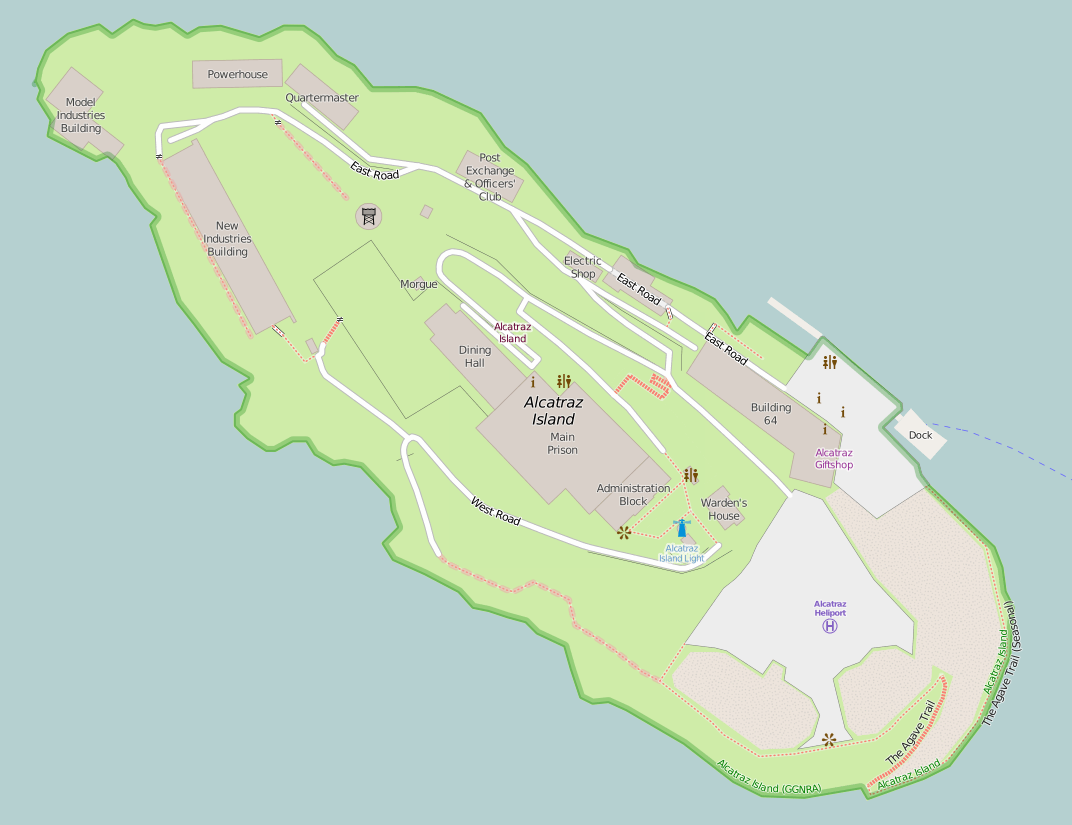
The Warden's House is labelled on the map of Alcatraz
