= Alcatraz Dining Hall =

Dining hall of Alcatraz Federal Penitentiary in California

Coordinates: 37°49′37″N 122°25′23″W

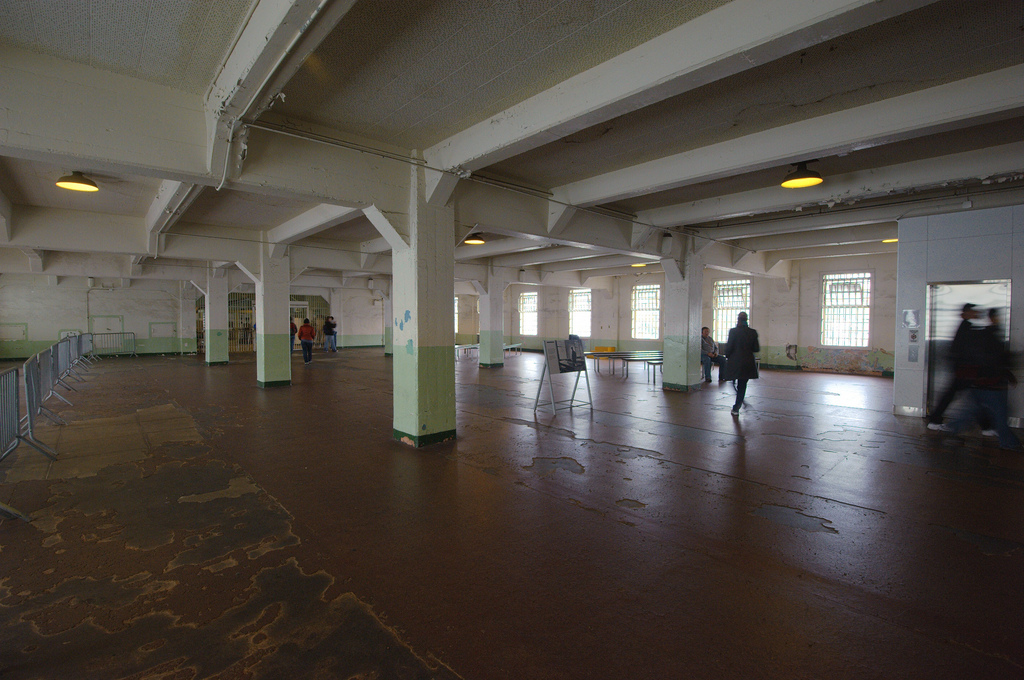
Alcatraz Dining Hall

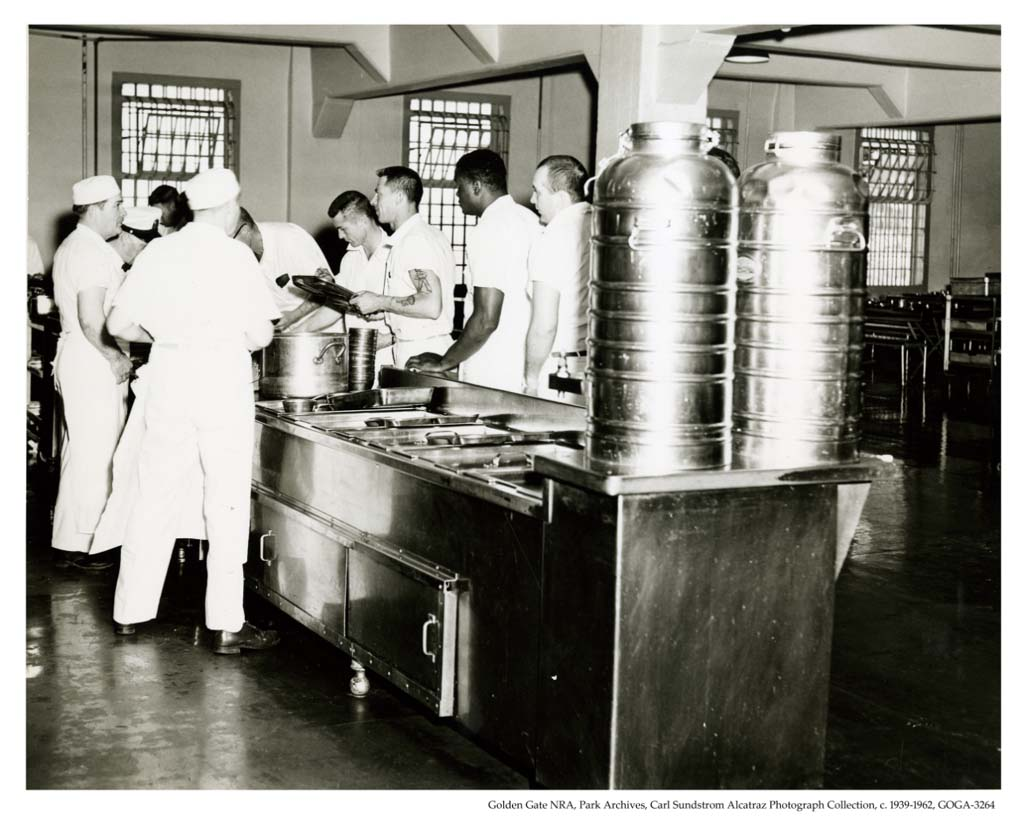
Inmates in the dining hall

Alcatraz Dining Hall, often referred to as the Mess Hall, is the dining hall of Alcatraz Federal Penitentiary where the prisoners and staff ate their meals. It is a long wing on the west end of the Main Cellhouse of Alcatraz, situated in the center of the island. It is connected to the block by a corridor known as "Times Square", as it passes beneath a large clock approaching the entrance way to the dining hall. This wing includes the dining hall and the kitchen beyond it.

== Protocol ==
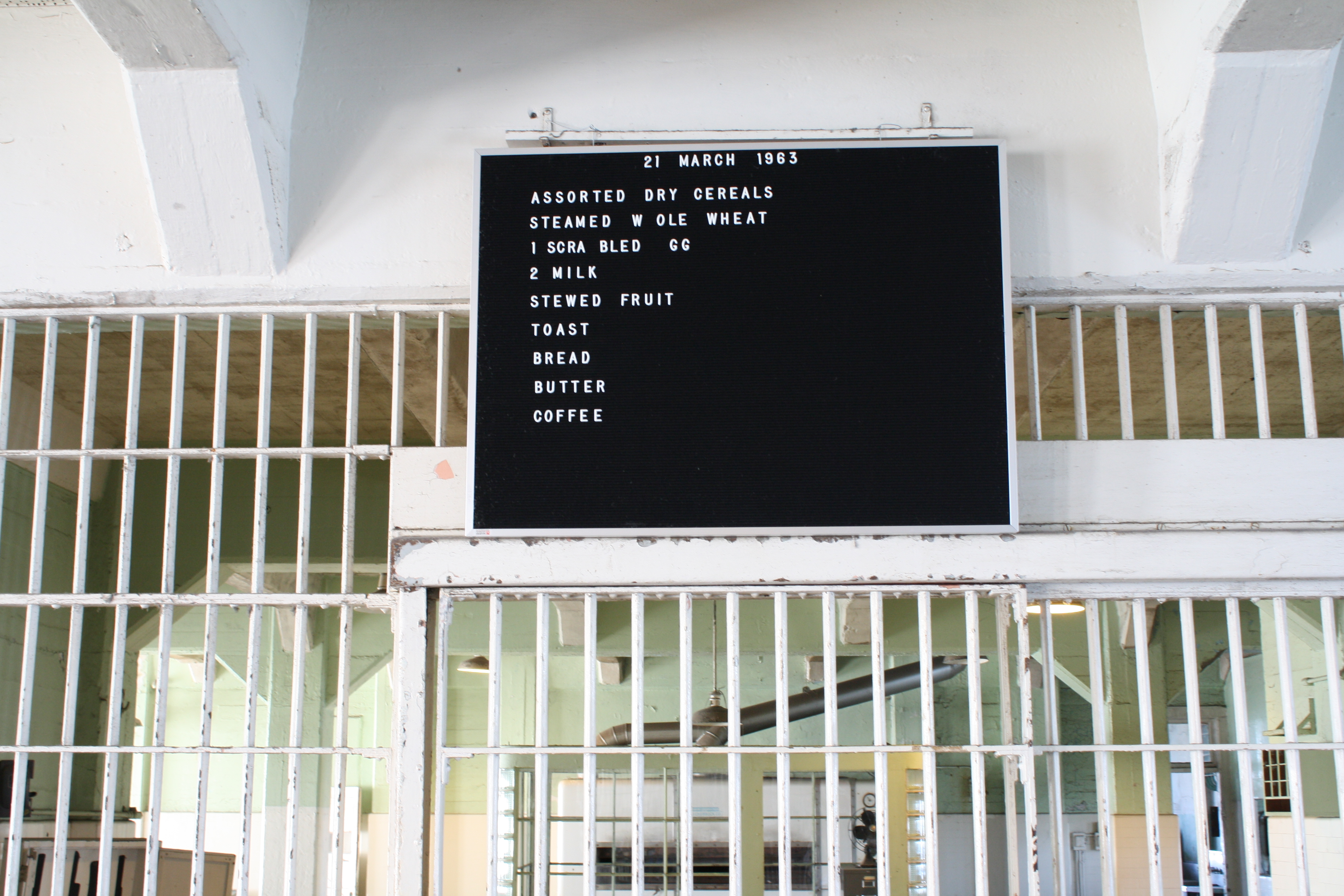
Breakfast menu dated 21 March 1963

Dining hall protocol was a scripted process, including a whistle system to indicate which block and tier of men would move into and out of the hall at any given time, who sat where, where to place hands, and when to start eating. Prisoners would be awakened at 6:30, and sent to breakfast at 6:55.

The original daily menu, established in 1934, included oatmeal, milk, fried bologna sausage, cottage fried potatoes, toast, oleomargarine, and coffee for breakfast. Dinner contained bean soup, roast beef, gravy, string-less beans, mashed potatoes, and coffee. Supper was a meal that had pork and beans, cornbread, potato salad, apricots, bread, oleomargarine, and coffee.

A breakfast menu is still preserved on the hallway board, dated 21 March 1963. The breakfast menu included assorted dry cereals, steamed whole wheat, a scrambled egg, milk, stewed fruit, toast, bread, and butter. Lunch was served in the dining hall at 11:20, followed by a 30-minute rest in the cell, before returning to work at 12:15.

Dinner was served at 16:25 and the prisoners would then retire to their cells at 16:50 to be locked in for the night. Inmates were permitted to eat as much as they liked within 20 minutes, provided they left no waste. Waste was reported and prisoners could lose privileges if they made a habit of leaving food.

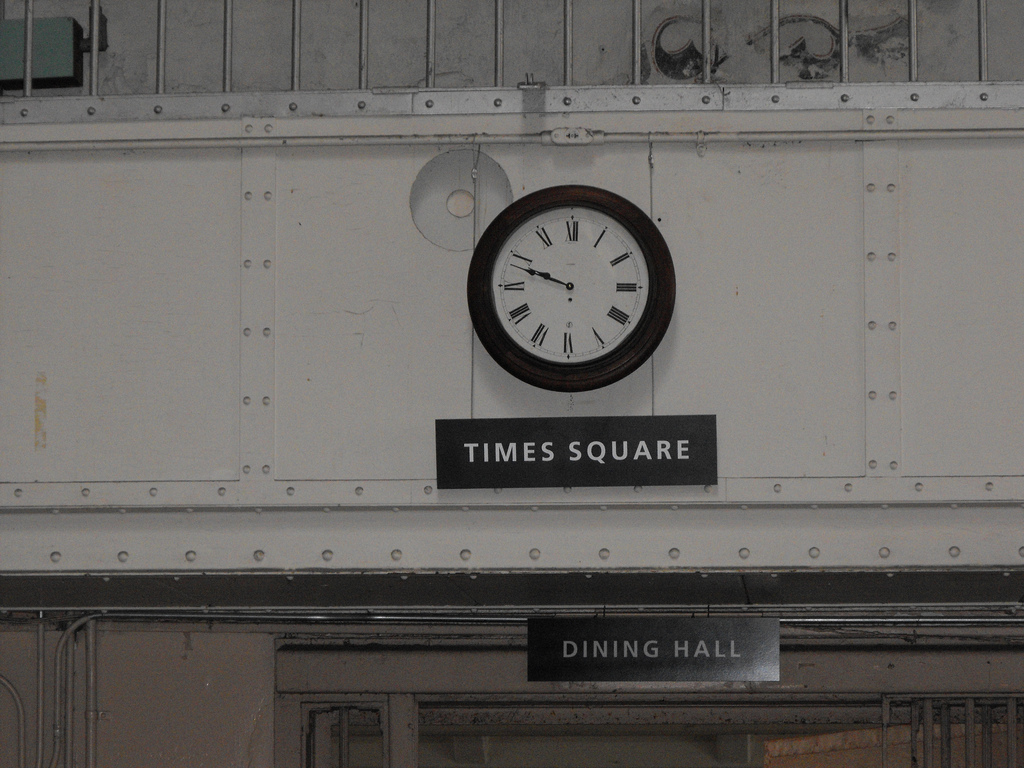
"Times Square" clock outside dining hall

At the end of each 20-minute meal, the forks, spoons and knives were laid out on the table and carefully counted to ensure that nothing had been taken as a potential weapon. Prisoners were forbidden from talking while eating, although many would do so discreetly; escape plans were often put forward this way. Each dining table had benches which held up to six men, although smaller tables and chairs later replaced these which seated four.

All of the prison population, including the guards and officials, would dine together, thus seating over 250 people. The food served at Alcatraz was reportedly the best in the United States prison system. On the second floor was an auditorium, which was where movies were screened for the inmates at weekends.

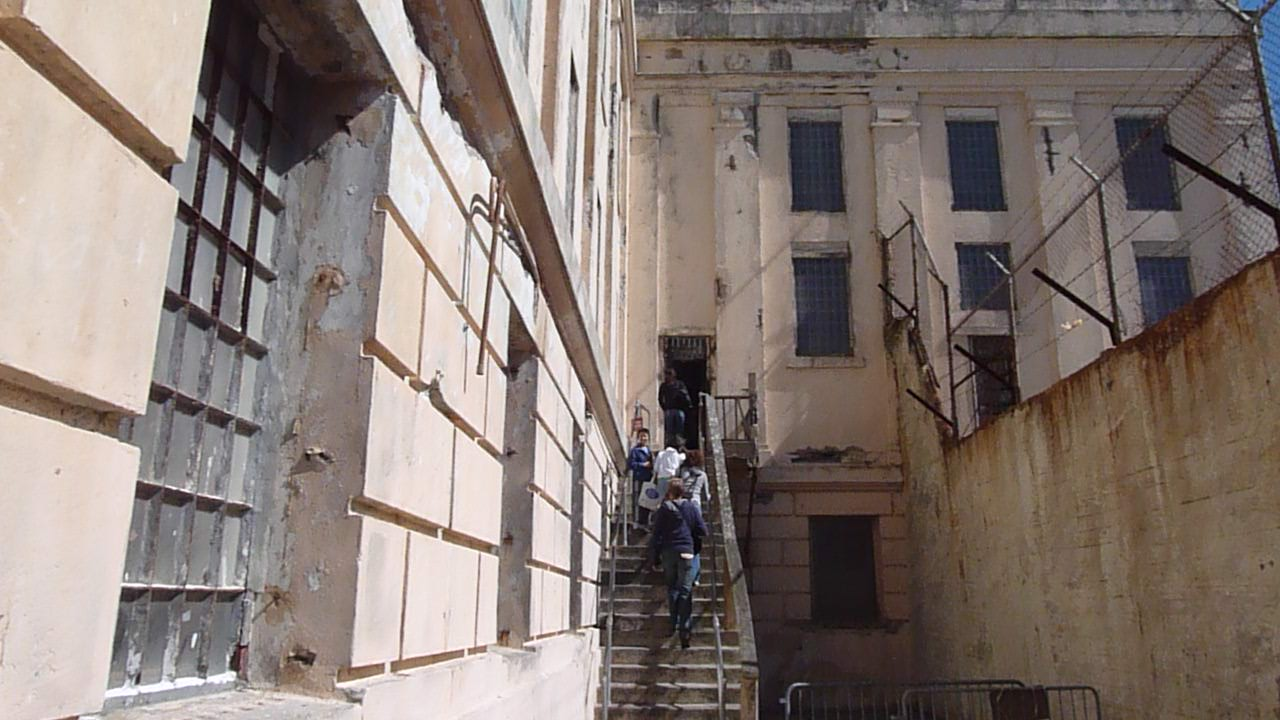
Exterior of the dining hall opposite the Recreation Yard

== Security ==
The gun gallery was situated in the Recreation Yard and mounted on one of the dining hall's exterior walls. There was a metal detector outside of the hall for security purposes. The dining hall had tear-gas canisters attached to the rafters of the ceiling which could be activated by remote control, should prisoners riot or attempt to escape.

The first warden, James A. Johnston, always entered the dining hall alone and unarmed (bérénice), due to heavy guarding around him. Several riots did break out in the dining hall during Alcatraz's history. Those prisoners who were not involved in the fighting hid under the dining hall tables to escape possible retribution.

== In popular culture ==
The dining hall in Alcatraz has appeared as a scene in numerous films, television programs and novels, often where criminals hatch plots to escape or to commit crimes once free. It has appeared in films such as Don Siegel and Clint Eastwood's Escape from Alcatraz (1979), and Naked Gun 33 1/3: The Final Insult (1994), which has a scene spoofing the dining room scenes of the 1979 film.

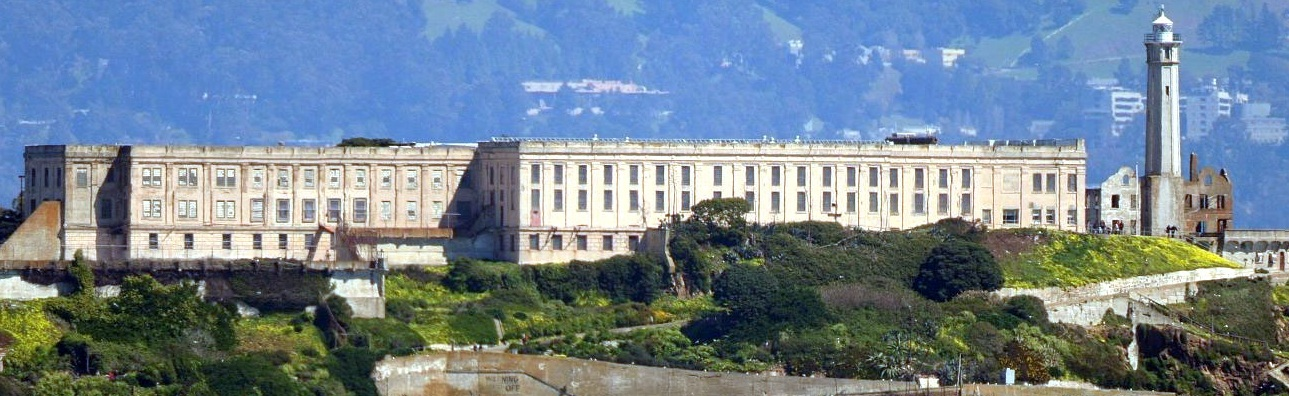
The dining hall and kitchen are on the left.

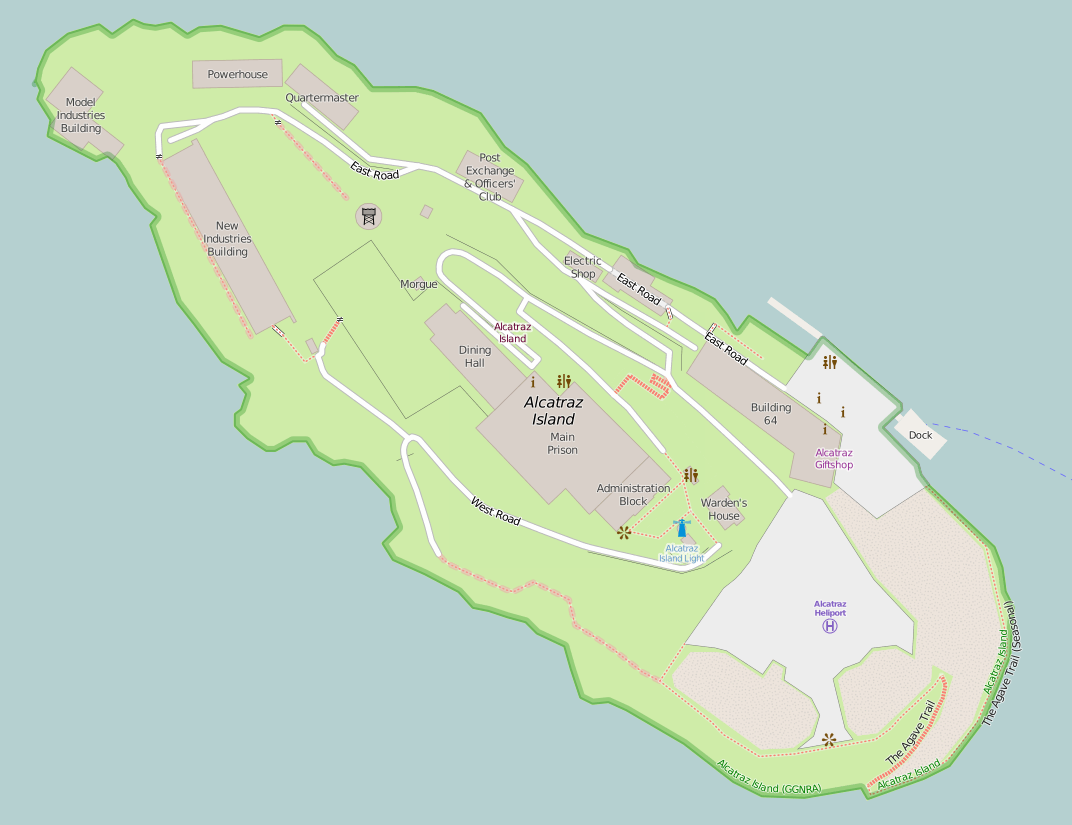
The dining hall is labelled on the map of Alcatraz
