= James A. Johnston =

Prison warden of Alcatraz (1874 –1954)

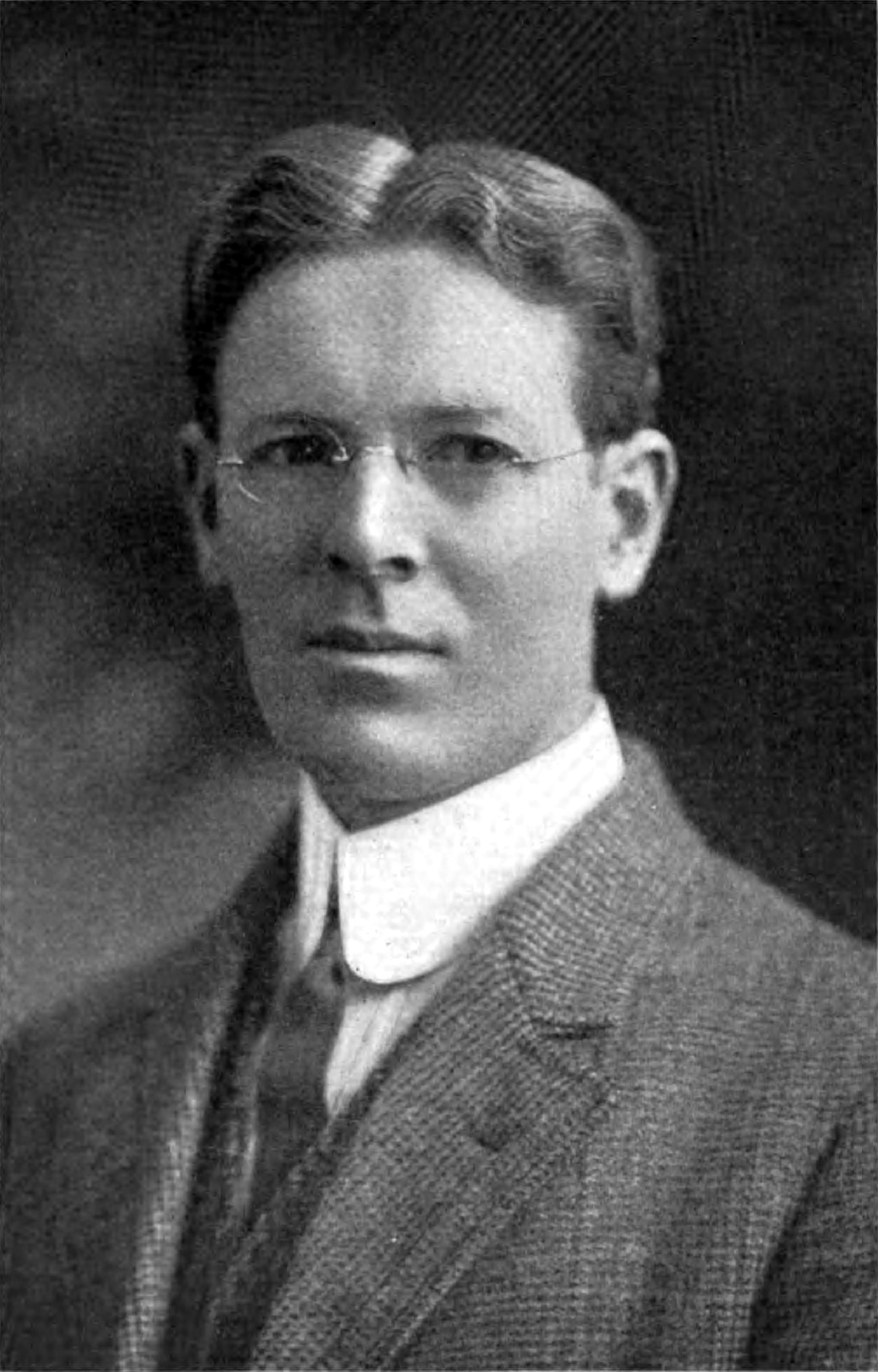

Warden of Alcatraz Federal Penitentiary
- In office 1934–1948
- Preceded by: Prison opened
- Succeeded by: Edwin B. Swope

Warden of San Quentin State Prison
- In office 1914–1924

Warden of Folsom State Prison
- In office 1912–1913

Member of the San Francisco Board of Supervisors
- In office 1907–1909
- Preceded by: Eusebius Joseph Molera
- Succeeded by: John L. Herget

Personal details
- Born: James Aloysius Johnston; September 15, 1874 Brooklyn, New York, U. S.
- Died: September 7, 1954 (aged 79) San Francisco, California, U.S.
- Spouse: Ida Mae Fulton (m. 1905)
- Children: 5
- Occupation: Politician; Prison warden Writer

James Aloysius Johnston (September 15, 1874 – September 7, 1954) was an American politician and prison warden who served as the first and longest-serving warden of Alcatraz Federal Penitentiary, serving from 1934 to 1948. He had earlier served as warden of California state prisons at Folsom (1912-1913) and San Quentin (1914-1924).

== Biography ==
Born in Brooklyn, New York and orphaned at the age of ten, Johnston began working at age fifteen in a clothing store at Weinstock, Lubin and Company in Sacramento, California. He sold neckties in the menswear department. He rose to General Manager of Weinstock Lubin.

After moving to San Francisco, he started his own store, Johnston's Men's Wear, at 916 Market Street.

Entering politics in the young city, he was elected to the San Francisco Board of Supervisors in 1907. In 1911 he was appointed to the California State Board of Control, headed by new gubernatorial appointee John Francis Neylan. The state legislature had given the board "centralized control of the financial outlays of most state agencies."

The next year Johnston was appointed to serve as warden of the state prison at Folsom State Prison (1912-1913), followed by serving a decade as warden at San Quentin (1914-1924) (see caption of image of Johnston). He became known for his focus on redeeming offenders and work to improve their lives; for instance, he treated those who needed it for drug abuse, and established educational and employment programs for inmates. In 1912 the state hired its first dentists to treat prisoners.

Johnston was considered to be both a strict disciplinarian and devout reformist. His rules included a strict code of silence, and he was nicknamed the 'Golden Rule Warden' while at San Quentin. He was relatively popular among inmates and guards, and also became known as "Old Saltwater". He is credited with challenging some of the harsh tactics used in the prison, including strait jackets and solitary confinement in darkness. He worked to improve the lives of prisoners.

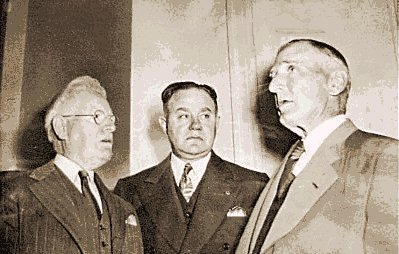
From left to right: Warden James A. Johnston, Associate Warden E.J. Miller, District Attorney Frank J. Hennessy, c. late 1940s

Based on this experience, Johnston was instrumental in the conversion and adaptation of Alcatraz Federal Penitentiary from its military use to serve as a federal prison. He was involved in its design in 1934. He served as the first warden of Alcatraz, from 1934 until 1948. He had the longest term of service of any succeeding warden.

In 1937 he was assaulted by Burton Phillips in the Dining hall, where he customarily ate with the prisoners and was unguarded. Phillips, convicted of robbery and kidnapping, allegedly beat the warden in anger at a worker's strike. Johnston did not let this incident deter him, and returned to attending meals unguarded in the Dining Hall.

Ten of the fourteen escape attempts from Alcatraz took place during Johnston's tenure,. These included what is called the Battle of Alcatraz from May 2–4, 1946, when Marines were finally called in to supplement prison guards in suppressing an escape attempt and related violence. Two Bureau of Prison guards were killed, as were three of the prisoners attempting escape. Others were wounded.

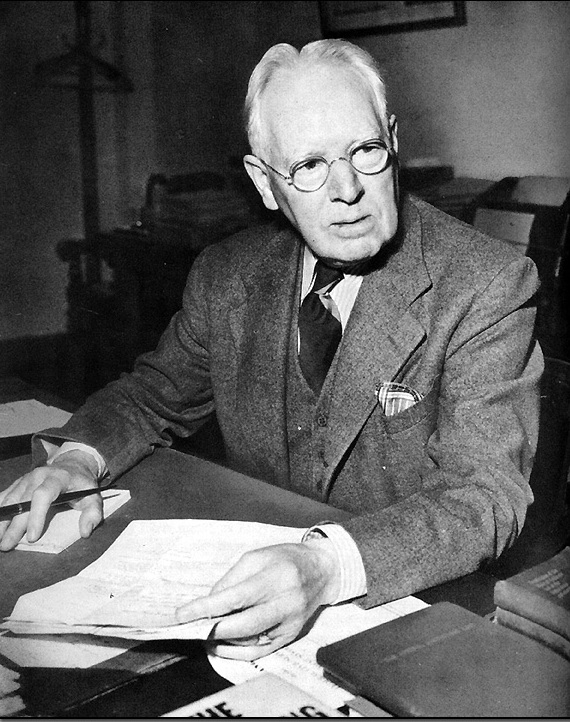
Johnston c. 1948

== Personal life ==
Johnston wrote several memoirs, including Prison Life is Different (1937, published by Houghton Mifflin). He documented his service as warden at Folsom, San Quentin, and Alcatraz.

He married Ida Mae Fulton on November 7, 1905, with whom he had a son and three daughters.

Johnston died of a bronchial infection on September 7, 1954, in San Francisco, California.
