= David L. Anderson (attorney) =

American attorney

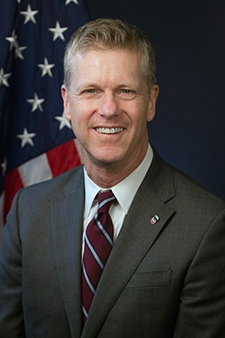

United States Attorney for the Northern District of California
- In office January 15, 2019 – February 28, 2021
- President: Donald Trump; Joe Biden
- Preceded by: Melinda Haag
- Succeeded by: Stephanie Hinds

Personal details
- Born: United States
- Education: San Jose State University (BS); Stanford University (JD)

David Lloyd Anderson is an American attorney who served as the United States Attorney for the Northern District of California from 2019 to 2021. Prior to becoming a U.S. Attorney, he practiced law at the law firm of Sidley Austin.

== Education ==
He received his Bachelor of Science, with distinction, from San Jose State University in 1985, and his Juris Doctor, with distinction, from Stanford Law School in 1990.

== Legal career ==
Anderson clerked for J. Clifford Wallace of the United States Court of Appeals for the Ninth Circuit from 1990 to 1991; for Associate Justice Anthony Kennedy of the United States Supreme Court from 1991 to 1992; and George H. Aldrich of the Iran–United States Claims Tribunal in The Hague from 1992 to 1993.

He previously served as First Assistant United States Attorney in the Northern District of California from 2008 to 2010 and as an Assistant United States Attorney from 1998 to 2002.

He also chaired the Magistrate Judge Merit Selection Panel in the Northern District and taught securities regulation at Hastings College of Law. In 2010, Anderson joined Sidley Austin, handling commercial and securities cases for clients including Wells Fargo. He was a partner at Sidley Austin in August 2018, when he was nominated to be a U.S. Attorney. In September 2021, Anderson returned to working at Sidley Austin, joining the firm's white collar practice.

== U.S. Attorney ==
On August 16, 2018, President Donald Trump announced his intent to nominate Anderson to be the U.S. Attorney for the Northern District of California. On August 27, 2018, his nomination was sent to the United States Senate. On January 2, 2019, his nomination was confirmed by voice vote. Anderson was sworn into office on January 15, 2019. He created a strike force to target corporate fraud in March 2019. In August 2019, Anderson announced the "Federal Initiative for the Tenderloin", a collaboration among 15 federal agencies, including the U.S. attorney's office, the Drug Enforcement Administration and the FBI. The initiative focused on prosecuting drug trafficking and other crime in the Tenderloin neighborhood of San Francisco.

On September 20, 2019, Anderson was one of nine U.S. Attorneys appointed by Attorney General William Barr to serve on the Advisory Committee of U.S. Attorneys. The committee "represents the voice of U.S. attorneys to Main Justice and provides advice and counsel on policy, management and operational issues impacting U.S. attorneys' offices."

On February 8, 2021, he along with 55 other Trump-era U.S. Attorneys were asked to resign. He resigned on February 28, 2021.

== See also ==
- List of law clerks for the first seat of the Supreme Court of the United States
