= Killer =

A killer is someone or something that kills, such as a murderer or a serial killer.

Killer may also refer to:

== Arts, entertainment, and media ==
=== Fictional characters ===
- Beaky Buzzard, a fictional character also known as Killer
- Killer, the secondary antagonist of the 1989 animated film All Dogs Go to Heaven
- Killer (Home and Away), from Home and Away
- Killer Kane, the villain of the 1939 serial film Buck Rogers

=== Films ===
- Killer! (1969 film), an alternative title for This Man Must Die
- Killer, a 1972 French crime drama directed by Denys de La Patellière
- Killer (1991 film), a Telugu film starring Akkineni Nagarjuna
- Killer (1994 film) (a.k.a. Bulletproof Heart), a film starring Anthony LaPaglia and Mimi Rogers, and featuring Peter Boyle
- Killer: A Journal of Murder (film), a 1996 film about serial killer Carl Panzram
- Kiler (film), a Polish comedy
- Killer (1998 film), a French/Kazakhstani crime drama
- Bulletproof Heart (film), 1995 film also known as Killer

=== Games ===
- Killer (game), a parlor game played with cards and candles
- Killer (pool), a multi-player pocket billiards (pool) game
- Killer, a climbing card game related to tiến lên
- Killer, a variant of the game of darts
- Assassin (game), or Killer, a live-action role-playing game
- Killer sudoku, or samunamupure, a variant of sudoku
- Killer: The Game of Assassination, a live action role-playing game set of rules first published by Steve Jackson Games in 1982

=== Literature ===
- Killer, a 1952 novel by Hank Janson
- Killer, a 1962 novel by Wade Everett
- Killer: A Journal of Murder, a 1970 biographical novel upon which the 1996 film is based
- Killer, a novelization of the 1983 TV serial by Glenn Chandler
- Killer, a 1985 novel by David Drake with Karl Edward Wagner
- Killer, a 1989 novel by James Pattinson
- Killer, a 2000 novel by Francine Pascal, the twelfth installment in the Fearless novel series
- Jimmy Coates: Killer, a 2005 novel by Joe Craig, the first installment in the Jimmy Coates series
- Killer (novel) a 2009 novel by Sara Shepard, the sixth installment of the Pretty Little Liars series
- Killer, a 2014 novel by Jonathan Kellerman, the 29th installment in the Alex Delaware series

=== Music ===
==== Groups ====
- Killer (Finnish band), an early 2000s Finnish alternative and experimental rock band
- Killer (Swiss band), a hard rock band
- Killer (Belgian band), a heavy metal band

==== Albums ====
- Killer (Alice Cooper album), 1971
- Killer (video), by Die Ärzte, 1999
- Killer (Tech N9ne album), 2008

==== Songs ====
- "Killer" (Adamski song), 1990, featuring Seal as a vocalist
- "Killer" (Baby K and Tiziano Ferro song), 2013
- "Killer" (Eminem song), 2020
- "Killer" (Fazer song), 2012
- "Killer" (Kiss song), 1982
- "Killer", by Boy Kill Boy from Civilian, 2006
- "Killer", by Dev from The Night The Sun Came Up, 2011
- "Killer", by The Hoosiers from The Trick to Life, 2007
- "Killer", by Kali Uchis from Isolation, 2018
- "Killer", by Krokus from Painkiller, 1978
- "Killer/キラー", by MORE MORE JUMP Hatsune Miku: Colorful Stage!, 2024
- "Killer", by The Ready Set from Feel Good Now, 2011
- "Killer", by Van Der Graaf Generator from H to He, Who Am the Only One, 1970
- "Kill[h]er", by Stand Atlantic from Was Here, 2024

=== Television ===
- "Killer" (CSI), an episode from the sixth season of the American television series CSI: Crime Scene Investigation (2006)
- "Killer" (Taggart), the 1983 pilot episode and title of the later renamed Scottish detective TV series Taggart
- Killer (TV series), a 1984 British thriller series which aired on ITV

== People ==
- Killer (nickname), a list of people known as "Killer" or "The Killer"
- Killer Brooks (1946–2020), ring name of American professional wrestler Tim Brooks
- Killer Khan (born 1947), ring name of Japanese professional wrestler Masashi Ozawa
- Daniel Killer (born 1949), former Argentine footballer
- Tobias Killer (born 1993), German footballer
- Bob Konovsky (1934–1982), American National Football League player and professional wrestler known as "Killer Konovsky"
- Killer Kowalski (1926–2008), ring name of Polish-Canadian professional wrestler Władek Kowalski

== Science and technology ==
- Killer (computer), an AT&T public-access UNIX machine involved in Operation Sundevil
- Death receptor 5, a tumor necrosis factor receptor superfamily, member 10b, a human gene, alias KILLER
- Killer application or killer app, a computer program that is so necessary or desirable that it proves the core value of some larger technology
- Killer NIC, a network interface card manufactured by Bigfoot Networks
- Killer yeast, a yeast, such as Saccharomyces cerevisiae, which is able to secrete one of a number of toxic proteins which are lethal to receptive cells

== Other uses ==
- Killer (philately), a term for a heavy stamp cancellation mark
- Killer, Germany, a village in the town of Burladingen, in the Killertal valley

== See also ==
- Kiler (disambiguation)
- Killa (disambiguation)
- Killah (disambiguation)
- The Killer (disambiguation)
- Killers (disambiguation)
- The Killers (disambiguation)
