= The Killer =

The Killer may refer to:

== Arts, entertainment, and media ==
=== Fictional characters ===
- Ghostface (Scream), a.k.a. "The Killer" – the murderer(s) in the Scream film series
- The Blackened, a.k.a. "The Killer" – the murderer(s) in the Danganronpa video game series
- Deadshot/Cross, a.k.a. "The Killer I" – the mastermind in the Wanted comic book series
- Wesley Gibson, a.k.a. "The Killer II" – the protagonist of Wanted and antagonist of Big Game
- "The Killer" – the unnamed protagonist of the self-titled Matz comic book and David Fincher film

=== Films ===
- The Killer (1921 film), an American western film directed by and starring Jack Conway
- The Killer (1953 film), a Turkish adventure film
- The Killer (1972 film), a Hong Kong film produced by Shaw Brothers Studio
- The Killer (1989 film), a Hong Kong action and crime film directed by John Woo and starring Chow Yun Fat
- The Killer (2006 film), a Bollywood film starring Emraan Hashmi and Irrfan Khan
- The Killer (2007 film), a French film directed by Cédric Anger
- The Killer, a 2007 horror short starring Michael Learned
- The Killer (2017 film), a Brazilian film
- The Killer (2022 film), a South Korean film
- The Killer (2023 film), a film adaptation of a French comic directed by David Fincher
  - The Killer (2023 soundtrack)
- The Killer (2024 film), a remake of the 1989 film
  - The Killer (2024 soundtrack)

=== Literature ===
- The Killer, a 1919 novel by Stewart Edward White
- The Killer, a 1933 novel by Walter B. Gibson about the fictional character The Shadow
- The Killer, a 1938 novel by Carolyn Wells
- "The Killer (poem)", a 1947 poem by Judith Wright
- The Killer, a 1951 novel by Whit Masterson under the pseudonym Wade Miller
- "The Killer", a 1952 short story by J. T. Oliver, first published in the March 1952 issue of Imagination
- The Killer (play) (French: Tueur sans gages), a 1958 play by Eugène Ionesco
- The Killer (Wilson novel), a 1970 novel by Colin Wilson
- The Killer, a 1981 novel by Steven F. Havill
- "The Killer" (short story), a 1994 short story by Stephen King
- The Killer (Portuguese: O Matador), a 1995 novel by Patrícia Melo
- The Killer (comics), (French: Le Tueur), a 1998 French comic book written by Matz
- The Killer, a 2001 novel by Linda Joy Singleton, the fifth installment in the Regeneration series
- The Killer, a 2021 novel by Tony Roberts, the 54th installment in the Casca series

=== Music ===
- The Killer (Shed album), 2012
- The Killer (Impious album), 2002
- "The Killer", song by Mobile from the album Tales from the City, 2008

=== Television ===
- "The Killer", Abot-Kamay na Pangarap episode 191 (2023)
- "The Killer", Black Saddle season 2, episode 13 (1960)
- "The Killer", Code 3 episode 33 (1957)
- "The Killer", Curon episode 3 (2020)
- "The Killer", Dr. Simon Locke season 4, episode 10 (1974)
- "The Killer", Flower of Evil episode 8 (2022)
- "The Killer", Gunsmoke season 1, episode 28 (1956)
- "The Killer", JAG season 8, episode 10 (2002)
- "The Killer", Kodiak episode 9 (1974)
- "The Killer", Lassie season 6, episode 32 (1960)
- "The Killer", Man with a Camera season 2, episode 1 (1959)
- "The Killer", Mission: Impossible season 5, episode 1 (1970)
- "The Killer", Mission: Impossible episode 1 (1988)
- "The Killer", Paradise Falls season 1, episode 13 (2001)
- "The Killer", Pony Express episode 2 (1960)
- "The Killer", Redcap season 2, episode 3 (1966)
- "The Killer", Seven Brides for Seven Brothers episode 16 (1983)
- "The Killer", Tales of Wells Fargo season 3, episode 12 (1958)
- "The Killer", The Adventures of William Tell episode 22 (1959)
- "The Killer", The Better Woman season 1, episode 54 (2019)
- "The Killer", The Hitchhiker season 3, episode 3 (1985)
- "The Killer", The Life and Legend of Wyatt Earp season 1, episode 8 (1955)
- "The Killer", The Vampire Diaries season 4, episode 5 (2012)
- "The Killer", Whirlybirds season 2, episode 7 (1958)

== People ==
- "The Killer", a nickname of singer/pianist Jerry Lee Lewis
- "The Killer", a nickname of O.J. Simpson, used by the relatives of Ron Goldman, whom Simpson was acquitted of murdering, along with his ex-wife Nicole Brown Simpson, in 1995.
- The King Killer, a professional wrestler from United States Wrestling Association

== See also ==
- Killer (disambiguation)
- The Killers (disambiguation)
- Killers (disambiguation)
