= Luxury Problems (Andy Stott album) =

Studio album by Andy Stott
- Released: 6 November 2012
- Genres: Dark ambient; Industrial techno; Ambient techno
- Length: 48:49
- Label: Modern Love
- Producer: Andy Stott

Andy Stott chronology
We Stay Together (2011)	Luxury Problems (2012)	Faith in Strangers (2014)

Luxury Problems is the second studio album by English electronic musician Andy Stott. It was released on 6 November 2012 by Modern Love.

== Style and influences ==
Stott's EP Passed Me By (2011) marks the beginning of the part of his discography where he made tracks with a less dub techno-tinged style that defined his previous records, opting instead for a much more bass-heavy sound a la Sunn O))) and Demdike Stare, slower tempos, and more abstract arrangements. However, the EP still contained elements of techno on tracks like “New Ground” or “North To South." Luxury Problems maintains the dark and abstract structure defined by Passed Me By and another EP by Stott released in 2011 named We Stay Together and is the first record in Stott's career where even the smallest elements of the techno music that inspired his earliest works are completely absent.

The tone and sound of Luxury Problems came from how significantly Stott's personal life was changed by the time he was working on his EP Passed Me By (2011). He started to not have any sleep and wasn't aware when a day actually started and ended anymore, which resulted with an LP having an unsure, fuzzy, and unsteady feel. Electronic Beats analogized the album's set of sounds as presenting a "beautifully decayed aura of concrete and chrome, halogen and grime—the soul of a heaving, monstrous city at twilight, equal (yet often struggling) parts fragile light and enclosing darkness."

Stott explained that he wasn't influenced by any other music when he produced the album, much like Passed Me By where he only intended to create "tunes that sounded right to me." Despite this, Juno Plus journalist Richard Brophy still noticed parts of other works and "familiar" musical styles on Luxury Problems, such as the elements of the My Bloody Valentine album Loveless (1991) on “Numb" and the oldschool jungle-style sub bass on “Sleepless.” He compared the instrumental of “Up The Box” to the works of Stott's project Millie & Andrea. He also suggested the foggy weather of Stott's hometown Manchester came into shaping Luxury Problems' hazy atmosphere. Reed Scott Reid of Tiny Mix Tapes noted elements of 1990s music on the album, such as the flanging Amen break drum sample on “Up The Box."

== Production and vocals ==
Luxury Problems was the first album in Stott's discography to feature vocal performances from his former piano teacher Alison Skidmore. Stott explained in an interview, "Someone asked me if I had ever thought of working with a vocalist and I thought it would be too messy and that I’d make a hash of it." He then discussed with Modern Love about using vocals in his music, which the label felt was a "great idea." Thus, Skidmore made singing contributions to the LP. Critics compared Skidmore's vocal performance on the album to Julee Cruise, Tracey Thorn, Elizabeth Fraser, and Lisa Gerrard. The only track on the album that does not feature vocals is "Up the Box." While Luxury Problems was the first record by Stott that featured her singing, it was not the first release by him where she was credited on the liner notes. On the back cover of his debut album Merciless (2006), he gives a special thanks to her "for the lessons." The Quietus suggested that the use of vocals on the album was a contributor to Andy Stott becoming very popular beyond the techno scene.

Stott started working on a third full-length album shortly after We Stay Together was released. The making of each track began with Skidmore composing and recording a capella pieces, sending them to Stott via email for him to make songs around them. He favorably stated that he "could create an atmosphere with Alison's vocal alone." Like Passed Me By and We Stay Together, the field recording sounds on Luxury Problems were tracked via an iPhone, and it was the last time Stott used an iPhone to do this before he transitioned to a Zoom field recorder for his later works. The editing and mixing of Luxury Problems took place within the digital audio workstation Ableton Live.

As Stott described how he worked with the vocal recordings, "some of the vocals she sent were already layered. I’d get a lead from the way she had layered them, it gave me an avenue to go down. Some of the versions didn’t work because all the vocals were presented as the final versions, so there was no other way to write it, this was probably something subconscious." He also said in regards to how Modern Love reacted to Stott's new vocal-based formula, "I started handing [the finished tracks] the label, and they were like, 'This is it. This is what we're after.'"

== Concept ==
Stott stated that he "stole" the title of Luxury Problems from the phrase "I have luxury problems" said by a producer he met in a Paris gig. He told Stott that he had to go back to Berlin to "complete two big projects for major artists" after the gig was finished. This was going on at the time when he had similar luxury issues that was caused by him leaving his full-time job at Mercedes to move into an actual studio to produce music full-time. Despite claiming in a 2016 interview that Stott is never influenced by personal experiences when he makes his music, he said in 2012 that Luxury Problems was inspired by what was going on his life. "Expecting" is based on the time he and his wife were expecting their first kid, "Sleepless" came from his experience of being a dad, "Leaving" is about the time he left his full-time job at Mercedes, and "Lost & Found" regards the time he got lost before performing at a show in Austria.

== Reception ==
Professional ratings
Aggregate scores
Source	Rating
AnyDecentMusic?	8.1/10
Metacritic	86/100
Review scores
Source	Rating
AllMusic	5/5 stars
The Austin Chronicle	4/5 stars
Exclaim!	9/10
The Irish Times	4/5 stars
Pitchfork	8.7/10
PopMatters	9/10
Resident Advisor	4.5/5
Rolling Stone	3.5/5 stars
Spin	8/10
Uncut	8/10

The bright tone of Skidmore's vocals contracts, as well as interplays with, the sinister vibe of the instrumentals, which was praised in not only reviews of Luxury Problems but also in pieces about his later albums which had a similar sound including Too Many Voices (2016). Luxury Problems received Pitchfork's label of "Best New Album" in a review by Mark Richardson, praising it for being "simultaneously more complex and more accessible" than his previous works. He honored Stott for making a more "dynamic" record by "humaniz[ing] his sound" and "ma[king] it more beautiful and richer on the surface while further accentuating its dark heart." He also highlighted that "none of these tracks feel like they have to be any one thing, they're always growing and changing and defying expectations."

=== Accolades ===
Year-end lists
Publication	Rank
The 405	5
Beats per Minute	3
Coke Machine Glow	16
Exclaim!	13
Gorilla vs. Bear	20
Los Angeles Times	8
The New Republic	4
Obscure Sound	29
Pazz & Jop	29
Pitchfork	14
PopMatters	28
PopMatters (Electronic)	1
The Quietus	28
Resident Advisor	4
Tiny Mix Tapes	8
The Wire	18
Best Albums of 2010–14
Publication	Rank
Pitchfork	55

== Track listing ==
No.	Title	Length
1.	"Numb"	6:30
2.	"Lost and Found"	6:05
3.	"Sleepless"	5:49
4.	"Hatch the Plan"	8:39
5.	"Expecting"	7:55
6.	"Luxury Problems"	5:03
7.	"Up the Box"	5:00
8.	"Leaving"	3:42

== Charts ==
Chart (2012)	Peak position
Belgian Albums (Ultratop Flanders)	167
US Top Dance Albums (Billboard)	24
US Heatseekers Albums (Billboard)	44
