= We Stay Together =

We Stay Together may refer to:

- We Stay Together (EP), a 2011 EP by Andy Stott
- "We Stay Together", a song by Kaiser Chiefs from the album Stay Together
