= It Should Be Us =

EP by Andy Stott
- Released: 8 November 2019
- Genre: Electronic
- Length: 46:35
- Label: Modern Love

Andy Stott chronology
Too Many Voices (2016)	It Should Be Us (2019)	Never the Right Time (2021)

It Should Be Us is an EP by British record producer Andy Stott. It was released on 8 November 2019 through Modern Love. It received generally favorable reviews from critics.

== Background ==
Andy Stott is a British record producer. It Should Be Us is his first release since Too Many Voices (2016). It is a double EP. The vinyl edition consists of eight tracks, while the digital edition consists of nine tracks. The EP was released on 8 November 2019 through Modern Love.

== Critical reception ==
Professional ratings
Aggregate scores
Source	Rating
Metacritic	79/100
Review scores
Source	Rating
AllMusic	4/5 stars
Pitchfork	7.5/10

According to the review aggregator Metacritic, It Should Be Us received "generally favorable reviews" based on a weighted average score of 79 out of 100 from 4 critic scores.

Paul Simpson of AllMusic wrote, "Stott's music is disorienting and sickly, but it's also undeniably full of life, and It Should Be Us is just as fascinating as one would expect." Philip Sherburne of Pitchfork stated, "it takes post-punk's bleak worldview and reformats it for the 21st century, mimicking corrupt files to create a new music of technological failure." Ryan Keeling of Resident Advisor called it "a continuation of one of the most impressive artistic developments we've had in recent electronic music."

=== Accolades ===
Year-end lists for It Should Be Us
Publication	List	Rank	Ref.
Paste	The 20 Best Electronic Releases of 2019	19	
Stereogum	25 Great EPs from 2019	—	
XLR8R	XLR8R's Best of 2019: Releases	—	

== Track listing ==
It Should Be Us track listing
No.	Title	Length
1.	"Dismantle"	4:16
2.	"Promises"	6:04
3.	"Collapse"	3:38
4.	"It Should Be Us"	5:26
5.	"Take"	6:06
6.	"Not This Time"	4:41
7.	"OL9"	6:56
8.	"Ballroom"	4:02
9.	"Versi"	5:26
Total length:		46:35

Notes

- The vinyl edition does not include "Promises".

== Personnel ==
Credits adapted from liner notes.

- Andy Stott
- Jeff Goode – photography
