= Passed Me By =

EP by Andy Stott
- Released: 13 May 2011
- Genre: Dub techno
- Length: 33:29
- Label: Modern Love

Andy Stott chronology
Unknown Exception (2008)	Passed Me By (2011)	We Stay Together (2011)

Passed Me By is an EP by British record producer Andy Stott. It was released on 13 May 2011 through Modern Love. It received universal acclaim from critics.

== Background ==
Andy Stott is a British record producer. The music of Passed Me By was created in his old house and his new house. In a 2011 interview, Stott stated, "These tracks were written towards the back end of 2010, I'd say from about September onwards." The EP was released on 13 May 2011 through Modern Love.

== Critical reception ==
Professional ratings
Aggregate scores
Source	Rating
Metacritic	82/100
Review scores
Source	Rating
AllMusic	4/5 stars
Cokemachineglow	83%
Fact	4.5/5 stars
No Ripcord	8/10
Pitchfork	7.6/10
Sputnikmusic	4/5

According to the review aggregator Metacritic, Passed Me By received "universal acclaim" based on a weighted average score of 82 out of 100 from 4 critic scores.

Andrew Ryce of Fact wrote, "At a time when dub techno is one of the laziest and least inspiring genres in electronic music, one of the brightest people at its peripheries shows just how far into the jungle those borders extend, and it's one hell of a place to visit." Philip Sherburne of Pitchfork stated, "where Burial and Shackleton use the flickering syncopations of dubstep and garage to keep their music moving, Stott's 4/4 beats, reduced to a deathly crawl, give his music an even more hopeless cast."

=== Accolades ===
Year-end lists for Passed Me By
Publication	List	Rank	Ref.
Cokemachineglow	Top 50 Albums 2011	45	
Fact	The 50 Best Albums of 2011	28	
Pitchfork	Albums of the Year: Honorable Mention	—	
PopMatters	The Best Electronic Music of 2011	1	
Resident Advisor	Top 20 Albums of 2011	11	
XLR8R	Best Releases of 2011	30	

== Track listing ==
Passed Me By track listing
No.	Title	Length
1.	"Signature"	0:37
2.	"New Ground"	6:21
3.	"North to South"	4:50
4.	"Intermittent"	3:26
5.	"Dark Details"	6:04
6.	"Execution"	5:15
7.	"Passed Me By"	6:53
Total length:		33:29
