= Too Many Voices =

Studio album by Andy Stott
- Released: 22 April 2016
- Recorded: March 2015 – March 2016
- Studio: Andy Stott's basement studio (Manchester, England)
- Genre: Experimental; techno; house
- Length: 46:18
- Label: Modern Love
- Producer: Andy Stott

Andy Stott chronology
Faith in Strangers (2014)	Too Many Voices (2016)	It Should Be Us (2019)

Singles from Too Many Voices
- 1. "Butterflies" Released: 30 March 2016; 2. "Selfish" Released: 15 April 2016

Too Many Voices is the fourth studio album by English electronic musician Andy Stott. It was released on 22 April 2016 by Modern Love. The album involved Stott intending to create grime-influenced tracks, so much of the LP's sound palette is used from the Korg Triton, a workstation keyboard distinctively used in early grime instrumentals. Too Many Voices follows Faith in Strangers (2014) in terms of the dark and abrasive style of his discography first present on his EP Passed Me By (2011); however, it adds a much cleaner, more spacious, and what some reviewers labelled as an "airier" element to that sound, which caused the LP to garner more criticism from reviewers than his previous albums did, though critical reception was still very favorable. The album peaked at number 11 on the American Billboard Dance/Electronic Albums chart.

== Production ==
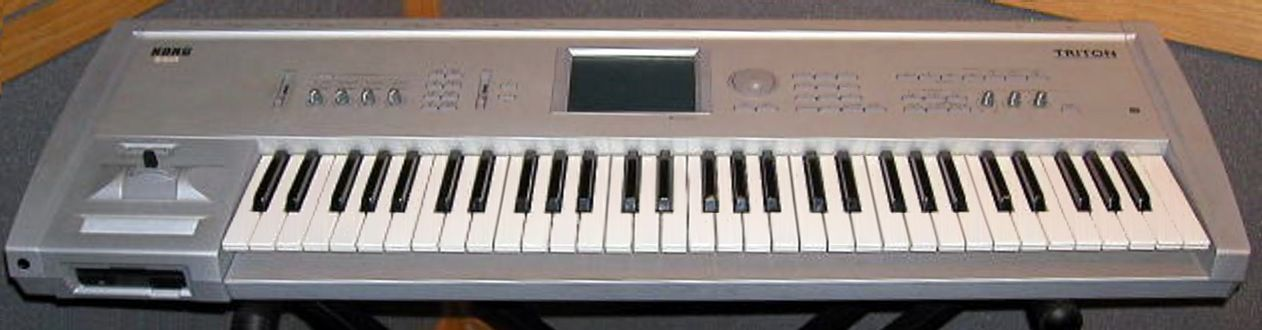
Given that Too Many Voices is a grime-influenced record, most of the sounds used come from the Korg Triton synthesizer.

Stott produced Too Many Voices at the basement of his home in Manchester for a year from March 2015 to March 2016. Due to Stott's goal of making a grime-influenced LP, most of Too Many Voices consists of sounds from a Korg Triton synthesizer that were also used in the grime works of acts such as DJ Slimzee, Dizzee Rascal, and Wiley. While he originally bought the Triton to give the album a grime style, he later got into the keyboard's other non-grime-related presets, including ethereal, sometimes choir-based pads: "It's kind of made me play in a different way, really. Just the sound of it, the machine, is really strange... Keeping space in the record was really a conscious thing. I really wanted to put more space in there." These textures are also on the record given that Stott enjoyed sounds that tried to be organic but were actually fake. With this in mind, Stott presented the humanity of the otherwise synthetic sounds through his disruptive and surreal use of the Triton's pitch bending feature.

== Composition ==
Too Many Voices is primarily influenced by early grime, the works of This Mortal Coil and Dead Can Dance, and the "fourth-world music" of acts like Yellow Magic Orchestra. Too Many Voices still contains elements of all of his past records; these include the deep bass instruments a la his extended play Passed Me By (2011) on “Selfish” and the ambient soundscapes in the style of his EP Mancunian (2013) on “On My Mind.” However, Too Many Voices has a cleaner, more spacious, and what some critics described as an "airier" sound than Stott's previous releases. Pitchfork's Andy Beta was one of these critics, describing the album as the end of Stott's "phase" in his career that started with Passed Me By where he had a dark, abrasive, and bass-heavy sound. The heavenly tone on Too Many Voices has been seen as most displayed on "Butterflies" and the title track.

According to PopMatters critic Andy Franquelli, the celestial aspect of the album, a set of "patches of comfort," "make things slightly more complicated," and create "an imbalance that makes the darker elements stand out and shine in all their misty glare." Spin magazine's Harley Brown described the record as "slowly decomposing" in a landscape that is "filled with air the way a corpse bloats, perhaps. The bright, pop-style vocals of Stott's former piano teacher Alison Skidmore are also present on Too Many Voices as was on his previous two albums Luxury Problems (2012) and Faith in Strangers (2014). However, despite the making of Luxury Problems and Faith in Strangers involving Stott creating atmospheres and sounds primarily around vocals she recorded, Too Many Voices is the first time the vocals sound like the main focus instead of just background sounds as half of the album consists of her singing, thus making the album Stott's most straightforward release. Skidmore's singing also encompasses more of an R&B tinge than on Stott's previous albums.

== Concept ==
Modern Love summarized Too Many Voices as "a vision of the future as was once imagined: artificial, strange and immaculate. Full of possibilities." Throughout the record, Skidmore sings about someone's personal fear of what will happen in the future. She sings on the closing title track, "11 stations from home/ Wonder if home will still be." The personal aspect of this anxiety comes from the acknowledgement of what has happened in the "recent past," or "home," wrote music journalist Birkut. Birkut wrote that the LP's futuristic theme relates to how Stott shaped the sound of the record, given that it has some of the elements of his previous works but still has a style that's different from them: "It’s as though Stott can’t quite let go of his past, but he is eager to move on and take his sound in a new direction."

Birkut's review of the album for Tiny Mix Tapes compared the neo-futuristic themes of the album to the works of Dead Can Dance and This Mortal Coil that Modern Love's press release claimed it was inspired by. He wrote that the album borrows the view of the future of Dead Can Dance's album Spleen and Ideal (1985), "where distant prospects are steeped in the unknown, and yet we remain intrinsically connected to it as individuals." Too Many Voices also uses that same compositional elements of Dead Can Dance and This Mortal Coil in that it uses "heightened emotional tension of the present seen through a futuristic lens," wrote Birkut. A difference of Too Many Voices and the music of the two duos is that the tension remains throughout the whole record. As Birkut wrote, "Where This Mortal Coil softened the blow of tracks such as “Come Here My Love” and “The Horizon Bleeds and Sucks its Thumb” with gentle ballads, delicate interludes, and folk covers, Stott retains that level of intensity on Too Many Voices without having to strike a compromise."

== Release and promotion ==
On 30 March 2016, an official video and single for "Butterflies" was released. The Michael England-directed video displays shots of New York City and dancer Rafael Martin performing moves in it. "Selfish" was issued as the album's second single on 15 April 2016. Too Many Voices was finally distributed by Modern Love Records on 22 April. Stott performed at three shows in the United States to support the LP: the Big Ears Festival in Knoxville on 31 March 2016, the Further Future Festival in Las Vegas on 29 April 2016, and Pappy & Harriet's in Pioneertown, California on 7 May 2016.

== Critical reception ==
Professional ratings
Aggregate scores
Source	Rating
AnyDecentMusic?	7.7/10
Metacritic	82/100
Review scores
Source	Rating
AllMusic	4/5 stars
Exclaim!	8/10
Mojo	4/5 stars
Pitchfork	7.1/10
PopMatters	8/10 stars
Resident Advisor	3.6/5
Spin	8/10
State	4/5 stars
Tiny Mix Tapes	4.5/5 marks
XLR8R	8.5/10

Too Many Voices garnered more criticism than Stott's previous albums. Beta found Stott's transition to a less "foreboding" mood with Too Many Voices to be inferior to his past works. He also wrote that most of the tracks felt "unfinished," writing, "there’s plenty of low and high end, but none of the gray in-between. It makes for an album that sounds more like backing tracks missing the singer and the song to complete them." Another review from Resident Advisor's Angus Finlayson opined that the album "marks a new stage on [Stott's] journey into the pop unknown, but it feels like he's not quite there yet." He wrote that some songs show that "Stott's pop sense is more finely honed than ever," while some "return to the techno trudge of Stott's 2011 breakthrough EPs, but without the grit and wheeze that made them so intense." A Spectrum Culture stated, "despite the quality of the tracks, nothing stands out as particularly revelatory after several LPs of subtle reinvention by the producer."

Regardless, critical opinion of Too Many Voices was still very favorable in general, some reviewers calling it Stott's best release. Birkut, scoring the album a 4.5 out of five, called the tracks on the album "some of [Stott's] most severely commanding and disturbingly tender songs to date." He described the LP as an "immersive experience that builds on [Stott’s] past without once holding [him] back," elaborating that while "fresh approaches are introduced from the opening track onward, there are heartening returns to the tested formulas that give Stott his gritty edge." As Aine Devaney of Crack magazine wrote, "there’s a space and light to this record that makes it [Stott's] most honest and sentimental release to date." David Molloy of Irish magazine State stated that the album "continues [Stott's] experimental streak with increasingly interesting results," also highlighting that, in contrast to his previous work, Too Many Voice's more spacious structure will attract new listeners while still leaving room for Stott to explore new types of styles and sounds. Franquelli described the album as "Stott at his best, a composer whose futuristic music is well rooted in today’s world, one that is badly connected to material reality, without a locus, with an idea of time that is flexible, adaptable."

In a June 2016, Spin listed Too Many Voices as one of "The 50 Best Albums of 2016 So Far." In terms of year-end lists, the album was awarded being one of the best releases of 2016 by XLR8R, the publication describing it "as soothing and beautiful as we've come to expect from Stott; an exquisite album and cerebral exploration that continues to grow on you the more it touches the turntable." It also made it into the year-end lists of best records by Tiny Mix Tapes, where it was number 31, and AllMusic.

== Track listing ==
All tracks are written by Andy Stott.

No.	Title	Length
1.	"Waiting for You"	2:41
2.	"Butterflies"	4:23
3.	"New Romantic"	5:39
4.	"First Night"	5:44
5.	"Forgotten"	5:47
6.	"Selfish"	4:34
7.	"On My Mind"	6:16
8.	"Over"	5:03
9.	"Too Many Voices"	6:07

== Personnel ==
Credits adapted from Resident Advisor and the liner notes of Too Many Voices.

- Andy Stott – production
- Alison Skidmore – vocals
- Matt Colton – mastering
- Julie Lemberger – photography

== Charts ==
Chart (2016)	Peak position
Belgian Albums (Ultratop Flanders)	101
UK Independent Album Breakers (OCC)	12
US Top Dance Albums (Billboard)	11
