= Looking Outward =

Book by Robert Stroud

Looking Outward: A History of the U.S. Prison System from Colonial Times to the Formation of the Bureau of Prisons by the "Birdman of Alcatraz", Robert Stroud, is a history of the United States Prison System from colonial times until the formation of the United States Bureau of Prisons in the 1930s.

Robert Stroud gained the permission of the Warden at Alcatraz Penitentiary, San Francisco, California to write a history of the U.S. prison system. Stroud had been incarcerated at McNeil Island, Leavenworth Penitentiary, Alcatraz Island and lastly at the United States Medical Center for Federal Prisoners. Stroud interviewed inmates, guards and administrative personnel at all those prisons. He also researched the written records on all of the other U.S. federal penitentiaries.

When Stroud finished his manuscript, he asked permission from the Warden at the Medical Center for Federal Prisoners at Springfield, Missouri, to send his manuscript to prospective publishers. The Springfield Warden sent his request to the Director of the Federal Bureau of Prisons at Washington, D.C. who refused Stroud's request to offer his manuscript for publication. The Director said that Stroud's manuscript aroused prurient interest in homosexual activity and libeled the reputation of some guards, whom Stroud described as sadistic, and libeled some wardens, whom Stroud described as incompetent or corrupt.

Charles Dudley Martin of Missouri represented Stroud in his lawsuit against the Warden of United States Medical Center for Federal Prisoners and the Director of the Bureau of Prisons. When Stroud died, (the day before President John F. Kennedy was assassinated), the judge ordered Stroud's manuscripts to be impounded in custody of the Clerk for the United States District Court for the Western District of Missouri at Kansas City. The Probate Court of the State of Missouri for Jackson County at Kansas City appointed Mr. Martin as administrator of Stroud's hand written will.

When Mr. Martin presented his letters of administration to the United States District Court for the Western District of Missouri and moved for custody of Stroud's manuscripts, the Bureau of Prisons dropped their objections after a hail of public criticism. The U.S. District Court then ordered the manuscripts delivered to the offices of Mr. Martin as administrator of Robert Stroud's estate.

An experienced literary agent in New York City was then retained, who offered a copy of Looking Outward to several New York publishers. Although they praised the manuscript, they declined to publish it. The prisoners, guards and wardens described by Stroud were at that time still alive. Only Stroud, who was dead, and his prisoner witnesses, who were scattered, could verify the claims of abuse and corruption. All of the publishers approached declined to publish Stroud's manuscript, fearing civil suits for publication of defamatory writings, along with potential civil damage suits for libel.

As of the 26th of December 2007, Mr. Martin still had Stroud's manuscript of Looking Outward in his possession, together with Stroud's hand written autobiography Bobbie. Mr. Martin also has the hand written notes of Thomas E. Gaddis, who wrote the biography and screen play of Birdman of Alcatraz.

== Fate of Stroud's manuscripts ==
With the court orders removing them from custody of the U. S. District Court and transferring them to Mr. Martin as the administrator of Stroud's estate, together with Thomas Gaddis's notes of Birdman of Alcatraz, Mr. Martin consigned the manuscript and partnered with Springfield, MO author; JE Cornwell. Together they attempted to attract a major publishing company to publish the manuscript into four books. Mr. Martin also expressed his intent to put the original hand written manuscript up for sale at an auction-house, which has locations in both New York, New York and San Francisco, California.

In early 2014, the imminent publication of Stroud's manuscript was reported by several news outlets.

On February 5, 2014, Looking Outward: A Voice From The Grave was made available for purchase as an Amazon Kindle eBook. By January 2015 it was also available in paperback form. As noted in the book's Prologue, "[the] work was originally divided into six parts. However, due to the death of the Writer, only four parts were completed" and the 2014 edition contains only the first of four parts of the entire manuscript, but as of Fall 2015 no additional date was known for the availability of the other two parts. As of 2023, the first three parts were available online at the Missouri State University Digital Collections website, while the fourth part was available by contacting the University directly.

== Sources ==
- Most information contained in this article is the result of email correspondence with Charles Dudley Martin - Legal Representative and Estate Administrator of Robert Stroud
