= Le Tueur =

Le Tueur may refer to:

- The Killer (comics), by Matz and Luc Jacamon
- The Killer (2007 film), directed by Cédric Anger
- Killer, 1972 film directed by Denys de La Patellière

== See also ==
- The Killer (disambiguation)
