= Faith in Strangers =

Studio album by Andy Stott
- Released: 18 November 2014
- Genres: Electronic; dub techno; techno
- Length: 53:51
- Label: Modern Love
- Producer: Andy Stott

Andy Stott chronology
| Luxury Problems (2012) | Faith in Strangers (2014) | Too Many Voices (2016) |

Singles from Faith in Strangers
- 1. "Violence" Released: 17 September 2014; 2. "Faith in Strangers" Released: 14 October 2014

Professional ratings
Aggregate scores
| Source | Rating |
|---|---|
| AnyDecentMusic? | 8.1/10 |
| Metacritic | 83/100 |
Review scores
| Source | Rating |
| AllMusic | 4/5 stars |
| The A.V. Club | A− |
| Consequence of Sound | B+ |
| Exclaim! | 9/10 |
| Financial Times | 4/5 stars |
| Pitchfork | 8.4/10 |
| Resident Advisor | 4.5/5 |
| Rolling Stone | 3/5 stars |
| Spin | 8/10 |
| Uncut | 8/10 |

Faith in Strangers is the third studio album by English electronic musician Andy Stott. It was released on 18 November 2014 by Modern Love. The album received critical acclaim, and the title track "Faith in Strangers" was given Best New Track and placed at number 81 on Pitchfork's list of the 100 best tracks of 2014. As with Stott's previous album Luxury Problems, Faith in Strangers also incorporates vocals from his former piano teacher, Alison Skidmore.

== Recognition ==
Year-end lists
| Publication | Rank |
|---|---|
| The 405 | 7 |
| The A.V. Club | 20 |
| Consequence of Sound | 48 |
| Crack | 21 |
| Fact | 4 |
| Gorilla vs. Bear | 11 |
| Noisey | 14 |
| Pitchfork | 45 |
| PopMatters | 36 |
| The Quietus | 22 |
| Resident Advisor | 1 |
| Rolling Stone (EDM, Electronic and Dance) | 8 |
| Spin | 33 |
| Tiny Mix Tapes | 9 |

== Track listing ==
| No. | Title | Length |
|---|---|---|
| 1. | "Time Away" | 6:24 |
| 2. | "Violence" | 6:38 |
| 3. | "On Oath" | 8:09 |
| 4. | "Science and Industry" | 5:32 |
| 5. | "No Surrender" | 4:59 |
| 6. | "How It Was" | 6:09 |
| 7. | "Damage" | 4:35 |
| 8. | "Faith in Strangers" | 6:29 |
| 9. | "Missing" | 4:56 |

== Charts ==
| Chart (2014) | Peak position |
|---|---|
| Belgian Albums (Ultratop Flanders) | 140 |
| UK Independent Album Breakers (OCC) | 11 |
| US Top Dance Albums (Billboard) | 18 |
