= We Stay Together (EP) =

EP by Andy Stott
- Released: 30 September 2011
- Genre: Techno
- Length: 37:02
- Label: Modern Love

Andy Stott chronology
Passed Me By (2011)	We Stay Together (2011)	Luxury Problems (2012)

We Stay Together is an EP by British record producer Andy Stott. It was released on 30 September 2011 through Modern Love. It received universal acclaim from critics.

== Background ==
Andy Stott is a British record producer. We Stay Together is his second EP of 2011, following Passed Me By. It consists of six tracks. It was released on 30 September 2011 through Modern Love.

== Critical reception ==
Professional ratings
Aggregate scores
Source	Rating
Metacritic	85/100
Review scores
Source	Rating
AllMusic	4.5/5 stars
Beats Per Minute	82%
Cokemachineglow	81%
Drowned in Sound	8/10
Fact	3.5/5 stars
Pitchfork	8.2/10
Resident Advisor	4.0/5

According to the review aggregator Metacritic, We Stay Together received "universal acclaim" based on a weighted average score of 85 out of 100 from 5 critic scores.

Will Ryan of Beats Per Minute commented that We Stay Together is "heavier, more defined, and arguably better" than Passed Me By. He added, "The feel of We Stay Together is consistently nocturnal, if not foreboding, though it never descends into Demdike Stare blackness." Andrew Ryce of Resident Advisor wrote, "Where the music on Passed Me By slowly destroyed itself with each passing bar, here it sounds like it's desperately struggling to hold together."

=== Accolades ===
Year-end lists for We Stay Together
Publication	List	Rank	Ref.
Cokemachineglow	Top 50 Albums 2011	45	
Pitchfork	Albums of the Year: Honorable Mention	—	
The Wire	Releases of the Year (2011 Rewind)	25	

== Track listing ==
We Stay Together track listing
No.	Title	Length
1.	"Submission"	4:50
2.	"Posers"	5:07
3.	"Bad Wires"	7:20
4.	"We Stay Together (Part One)"	6:36
5.	"Cherry Eye"	7:32
6.	"Cracked"	5:36
Total length:		37:02
