= Andy Stott =

British musician and producer

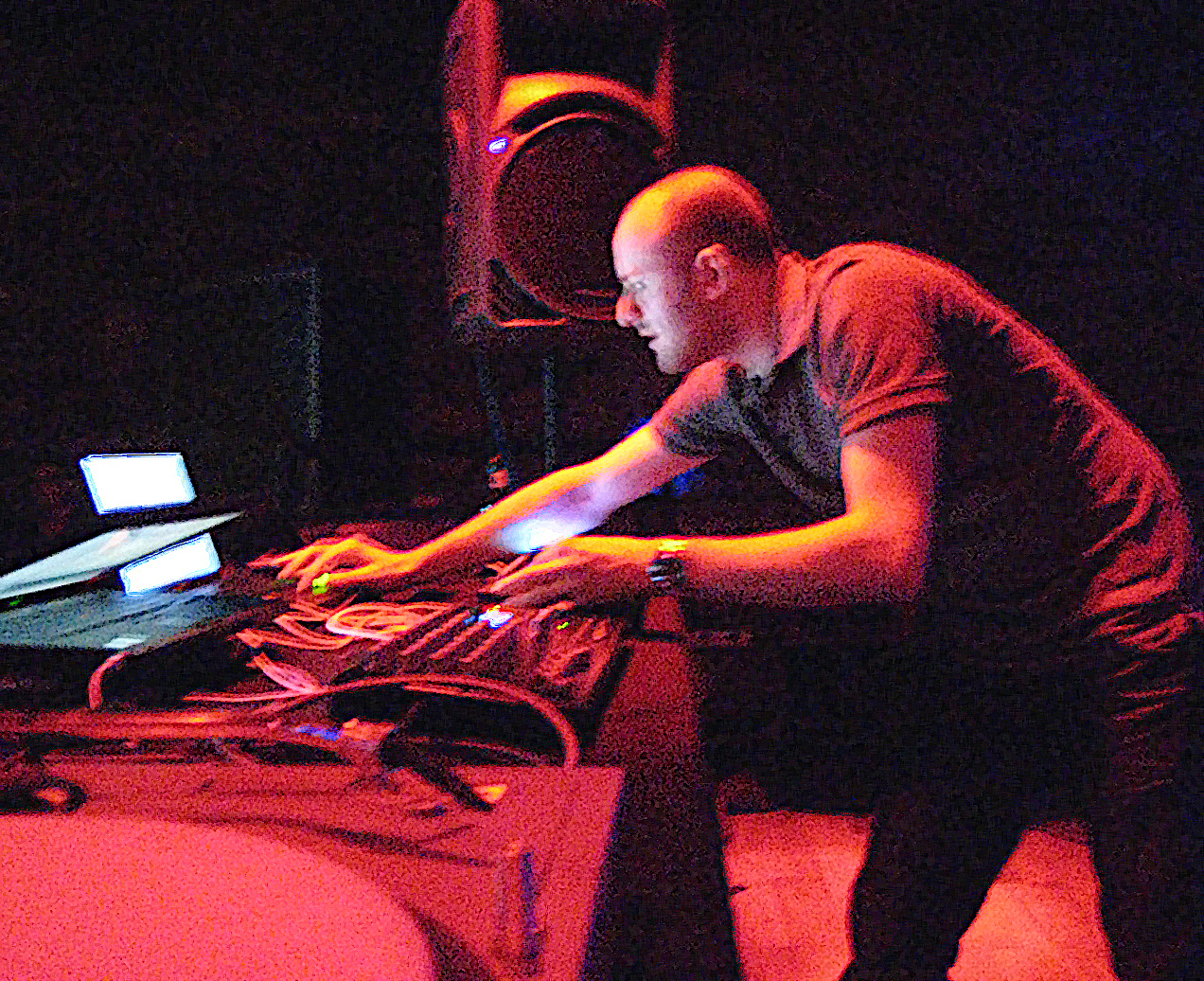
- Andy Stott performing live at CMKY Festival 2009

Background information
- Also known as: Andrea
- Origin: Manchester, England
- Genres: Electronic; techno; IDM; experimental; ambient; dub techno
- Occupations: Musician; record producer
- Years active: 2005–present
- Label: Modern Love
- Member of: Millie & Andrea

Andy Stott is a British electronic musician and producer, living in Manchester.

== Biography ==
Stott's debut album was Merciless (2006), followed by Unknown Exception in 2008. The EP Passed Me By (2011) marked a significant change in his sound; it has none of the elements of his previous dub techno release, opting for a much more bass-heavy sound. He then released the EP We Stay Together (2011). The album Luxury Problems was released in 2012. Luxury Problems received top album awards from both Resident Advisor and Pitchfork.

Stott has undertaken several productions under the moniker Andrea and these works were released on Daphne, a sublabel of Modern Love. Most of this work is in association with Miles Whittaker (who releases music as MLZ, with Pendle Coven, and as one half of Demdike Stare) who used the moniker Millie in the recordings and were released as Millie & Andrea. In 2012, Stott collaborated with the Brooklyn duo The Hundred in the Hands remixing Keep It Low from their 2012 album, Red Night. In March 2014, Millie & Andrea released Drop the Vowels.

Under his real name, Stott also released Faith in Strangers (2014), Too Many Voices (2016), It Should Be Us (2019), Never the Right Time (2021), and Late Loop (2026).

== Artistry ==
Stott analogises making music to a scientist creating compounds, by figuring out formulas that use studio gadgets and parts of other music. He never borrows inspiration from his personal experiences when he produces material. As Zach Sokol explained when he interviewed Stott in 2016, "his music draws from where he's at creatively, functioning as a reflection of whatever curiosity is currently making the gears in his head churn." When creating albums, he also tries to make each track have a very different aesthetic by using a variety of equipment and musical influences. As he explained, "I go to the studio and I don't mess around, but at the same time, I don't really know what's going to come out." Modern Love boss Shlom Sviri also contributes suggestions and ideas to Stott when he creates tracks and sequences the order of songs on his LPs.

All of Stott's work touches on many types of experimental styles and genre. Tiny Mix Tapes writer Birkut analysed Stott's works employ neo-futuristic themes and are hard to label in specific genres because they are "shifting disfiguration of Detroit techno, grime, house, and industrial music." Stott's music contains a melodic structure that has been compared by multiple critics to Cocteau Twins and Dead Can Dance. A trademark element in his works is the use of rhythms that are slightly off beat, which often gives the tracks a feeling of anxiety.

Since Luxury Problems, vocals from Stott's former piano teacher Alison Skidmore appear on his music, and numerous pieces about Stott's second, third and fourth studio albums highlighted, as well as praised, the interplay between the menacing instrumentals and the light tones of Skidmore's singing. The vocals have a bright pop tinge and an ethereal tone that contradict the otherwise sinister vibe of the instrumentals. As Stott discussed creating Luxury Problems, "when it was suggested that I use a vocalist, I was worried that it would sound different to the normal way that I write tunes, but when I heard that bass coming from the speakers, that visceral bass, I knew that I still wanted that undertone as a counterpoint to her vocals."

An Electronic Beats review of Luxury Problems described its sounds as presenting "the beautifully decayed aura of concrete and chrome, halogen and grime—the soul of a heaving, monstrous city at twilight, equal (yet often struggling) parts fragile light and enclosing darkness." Writing a PopMatters article about Too Many Voices, Alex Franquelli wrote that "patches of comfort" are included for the "sole purpose of creating an imbalance that makes the darker elements stand out and shine in all their misty glare." Reed Scott Reid's review of Luxury Problems for Tiny Mix Tapes analyse it "represents an apogee of scruffy elegance, curdled rhythms growling within the crumbling masonry of its bitworn shunt." He wrote the vocals "dimly illuminate a pervasive auroral gloom, shafts of ecru and dun mottled with putrescent tinctures; a mournful, angelic presence – a long-deceased sacristan, perhaps – bleeding through the aether as faint drumsteps crack gravel."

== Personal life ==
Stott is married, and has a son who was born in July in 2012.

== Discography ==
=== Solo albums ===
List of studio albums, with chart positions
Title	Year	Peak chart positions			
Title	Year	UK Indie Break	BEL (VL)	US Heat	US Dance/ Elect
Merciless	2006	—	—	—	—
Luxury Problems	2012	—	167	44	24
Faith in Strangers	2014	11	140	—	18
Too Many Voices	2016	—	101	—	11
Never the Right Time	2021	—	—	—	—
Late Loop	2026	—	—	—	—

=== Collaborative albums ===
- Drop the Vowels (with Miles Whittaker, as Millie & Andrea; 2014)

=== Compilations ===
- Unknown Exception (2008)

=== EPs ===
- Replace (2005)
- Demon in the Attic (2005)
- The Nervous (2006)
- The Massacre (2007)
- Fear of Heights (2007)
- Bad Landing (2008)
- Passed Me By (2011)
- We Stay Together (2011)
- It Should Be Us (2019)

=== Singles ===
As Andy Stott

- "Ceramics" (2005)
- "Choke" / "For the Love" (2006)
- "Merciless" (2006)
- "Handle with Care" / "See in Me" (2007)
- "Hostile" (2007)
- "Brief Encounter" / "Dripping" (2009)
- "Tell Me Anything" / "Love Nothing" (2010)
- "Anytime Soon" (2013)
- "Out (Version)" / "Love (Version)" (2014)

As Millie & Andrea

- "Black Hammer" / "Gunshot (Stripped)" (2008)
- "Spectral Source" / "Ever Since You Came Down" (2009)
- "Temper Tantrum" / "Vigilance" (2009)

As Andrea

- "You Still Got Me" / "Got to Forget" (2010)
- "Retail Juke" / "Write Off" (2010)

=== Remixes ===
- Pablo Bolivar — "Into The Televerse (Andy Stott Rmx)" (2008)
- Vladislav Delay — "Recovery Idea (Andy Stott Remix)" (2008)
- Badawi — "The Axiom (Andy Stott Remix)" (2011)
- Holy Other — "Know Where (Andy Stott Remix)" (2011)
- Hatti Vatti — "Great (Andy Stott Remix)" (2011)
- BNJMN — "Nightvision (Andy Stott Remix)" (2011)
- The Hundred in the Hands — "Keep It Low (Andy Stott Remix)" (2012)
- Blondes — "Pleasure (Andy Stott Remix)" (2012)
- Aschka — "Scrapewing (Andy Stott Remix)" (2012)
- Tricky — "Valentine (Andy Stott Remix)" (2013)
- Kowton — "Shuffle Good (Andy Stott Remix)" (2013)
- Batillus — "Concrete (Andy Stott Remix)" (2013)
- Maps — "I Heard Them Say (Andy Stott Remix)" (2014)
- Panda Bear — "Boys Latin (Andy Stott Remix)" (2015)
- Martin Gore — "Europa Hymn (Andy Stott Remix)" (2015)
- Ryuichi Sakamoto — "Life, Life (Andy Stott Rework)" (2017)
