= Killa =

Killa may refer to:

== Places ==
- Killa, Tripura, India
- Killa, a village in Degana, Rajahsthan, India
- Qila, sometimes spelt Killa, an element in placenames in South Asia
- Killa (Aeolis), a town of ancient Aeolis

== Music ==
- Emis Killa, Italian rapper
- "Killa" (Cherish song), 2007
- "Killa" (Yoasobi song), 2026
- "Killa", a 2004 song by Way Out West from Don't Look Now
- "Killa", a 2010 song by Lecrae from Rehab
- "Killa", a song by NEFFEX
- "The Killa", a 2024 song by Tomorrow X Together

== Other uses ==
- Killa (film), a 2015 Marathi language film
- Mama Killa ("Mother Moon"), a Quechua moon goddess
- Kilian "Killa" Elkinson (born 1990), Bermudian footballer

== See also ==
- Killas, a type of rock of southwestern England
- Kila (disambiguation)
- Killah (disambiguation)
- Killer (disambiguation)
