= Killah =

Killah may refer to:

- "Killah" (song), a song by Lady Gaga from the album Mayhem
- a slang spelling of the word "killer"
  - Ghostface Killah (born 1970), American rapper
  - Killah Priest (born 1970), American rapper
  - Lit Killah (born 1999), Argentine rapper

== See also ==
- Killa (disambiguation)
- Killer (disambiguation)
