= Shedding the Past =

Studio album by Shed
- Released: September 2, 2008
- Genre: Techno
- Length: 64:40
- Label: Ostgut Ton

Shedding the Past is the 2008 debut album by German techno musician Shed.

== Reception ==
Professional ratings
Review scores
Source	Rating
AllMusic	4/5 stars
Artistdirect	4/5 stars
Resident Advisor	4.5/5 stars
XLR8R	(6/10)

Resident Advisor—an online magazine with a focus on electronic music—named Shedding the Past as the best album of 2008. They also named it the 18th best album of the decade.

== Track listing ==
All tracks are written by Shed

No.	Title	Length
1.	"Intro"	1:07
2.	"Boose-Sweep"	7:06
3.	"Another Wedged Chicken"	7:09
4.	"Flat Axe"	7:23
5.	"The Lower Upside Down"	8:07
6.	"Slow Motion Replay"	7:22
7.	"Waved Mind/Archive Document"	4:12
8.	"Archive Document/That Beats Everything!"	5:51
9.	"Ithaw"	6:58
10.	"Estrange"	6:33
11.	"Ostrich-Mountain-Square"	2:52
