= Robert Stroud =

American inmate and ornithologist (1890–1963)

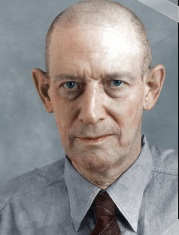
- Stroud in 1951
- Born: Robert Franklin Stroud; January 28, 1890; Seattle, Washington, US
- Died: November 21, 1963 (aged 73); Medical Center for Federal Prisoners, Missouri, US
- Other name: The Birdman of Alcatraz
- Occupations: Pimp; Salesman; Ornithologist
- Spouse: Della May Spore (m. 1931)
- Criminal charges: 1909 Manslaughter; 1912 Assault; 1916 Murder
- Penalty: 54 yrs overall Manslaughter 12 years imprisonment Assault 6 months imprisonment Murder Death, commuted to life imprisonment with the possibility of parole

Robert Franklin Stroud (January 28, 1890 – November 21, 1963), popularly known as the "Birdman of Alcatraz", was an American murderer and federal prisoner who became an ornithologist and author while imprisoned at Leavenworth. He was one of the most notorious criminals in American history.

Born in Seattle, Washington, Stroud ran away from his abusive father as a teenager and later worked as a pimp in the Alaska Territory. In 1909, he killed a bartender and was convicted of manslaughter, receiving a 12-year sentence at McNeil Island. While imprisoned, he developed a reputation for violence, including stabbings and attacks, which culminated in the fatal stabbing of Leavenworth a guard in 1916. Convicted of first-degree murder and initially sentenced to death, he was granted presidential clemency, and his sentence was commuted to life imprisonment in solitary confinement. At Leavenworth, he became known for raising canaries, published two books on avian diseases, and made several important contributions to avian pathology. In 1942 he was transferred to Alcatraz after prison officials discovered he had been using equipment supplied for his bird research to manufacture alcohol. There he was no longer permitted to keep birds and spent the rest of his life in federal custody. In 1959, with his health failing, he was transferred to the Medical Center for Federal Prisoners in Springfield, Missouri, where he died on November 21, 1963, which was the day before the assassination of John F. Kennedy.

The 1955 biography Birdman of Alcatraz by Thomas E. Gaddis and its 1962 film adaptation portrayed Stroud sympathetically. Former inmates described him as far more dangerous and unpleasant than the fictionalized portrayal.

== Early life and arrest ==
Stroud was born in Seattle, the eldest child of Elizabeth Jane (née McCartney, 1860–1938) and Benjamin Franklin Stroud (1858–1928). His mother had two daughters from a previous marriage. His father was an abusive alcoholic, and Stroud ran away from home at the age of 13. His prison record on occupations note: riveter and heater one year; waiter and cook 1½ years; peanut vendor 6 months.

At 18, in Cordova, Alaska, Stroud met 36-year-old Kitty O'Brien, a prostitute and dance hall entertainer, for whom he pimped in Juneau. On January 18, 1909, barman F. K. "Charlie" von Dahmer allegedly failed to pay O'Brien for her services and beat her. One report is that von Dahmer allegedly paid O'Brien only $2.00 instead of the customary fee of $10.00.

Stroud confronted von Dahmer, and after a struggle shot him to death. He then robbed von Dahmer of whatever money he had and gave it to O'Brien. Stroud surrendered himself, claiming self-defense on the grounds that von Dahmer had a pistol. According to police reports, he knocked von Dahmer unconscious and then shot him.

As Alaska was then a United States territory, Stroud was prosecuted in the federal courts, where he was found guilty of manslaughter and sentenced to 12 years in the federal penitentiary at McNeil Island, Washington.

== Prison life ==
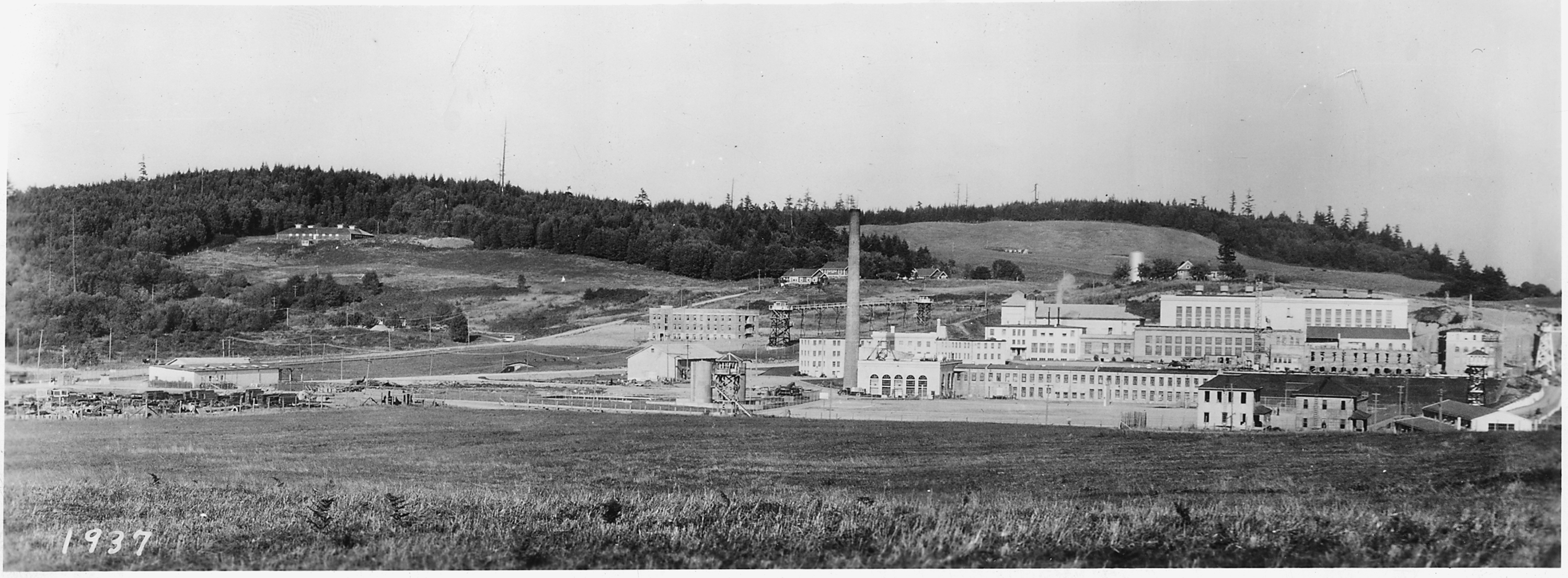
McNeil Island Penitentiary

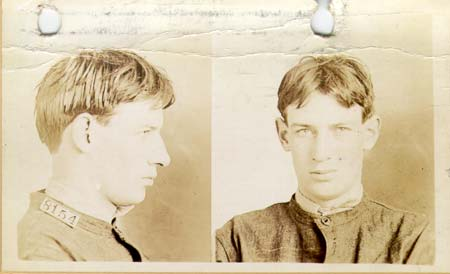
Stroud c.1912

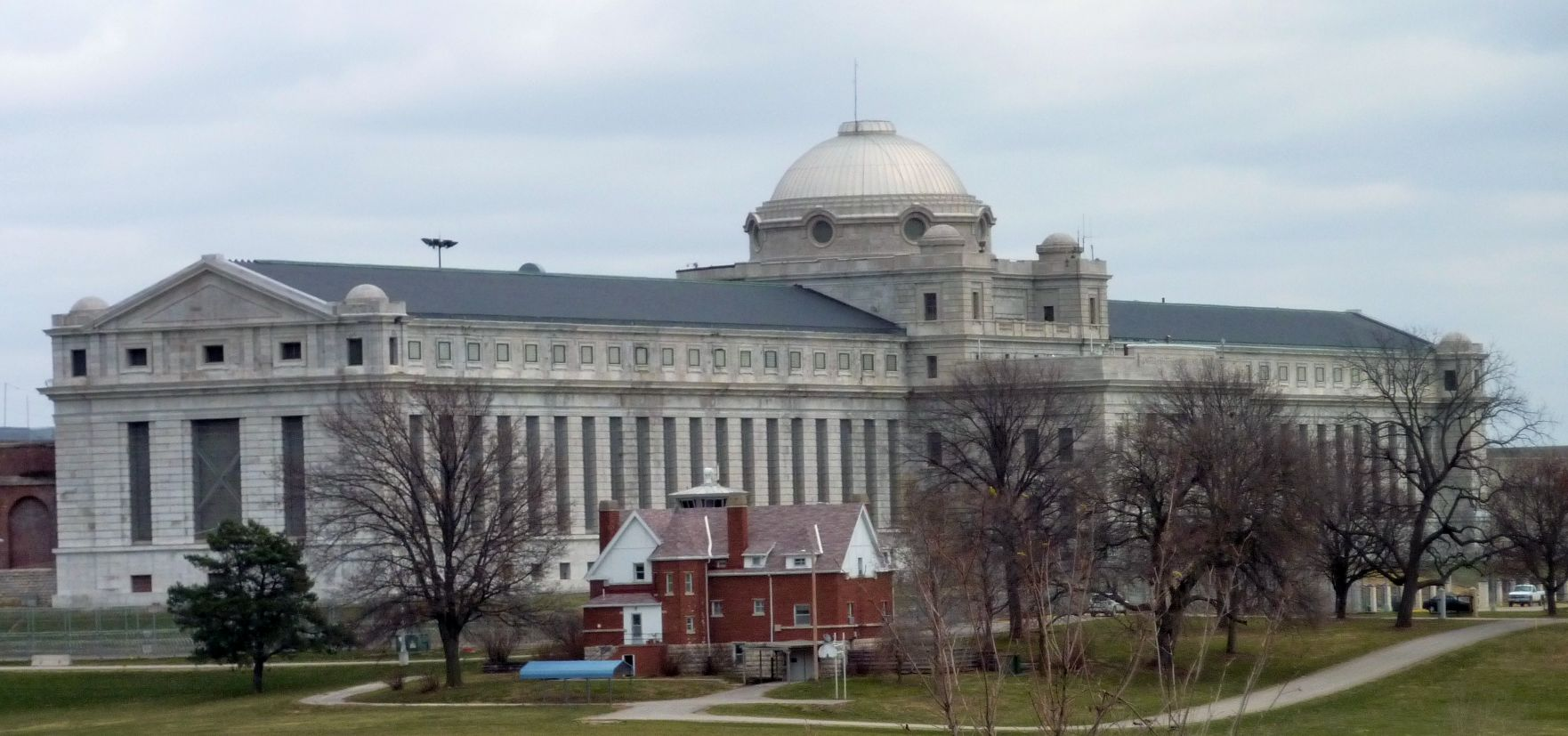
USP Leavenworth

Stroud was one of the most violent prisoners at McNeil Island, frequently feuding with staff and other inmates, and was prone to illness. He reportedly stabbed a fellow prisoner who reported him for stealing food, assaulted a hospital orderly who had reported him to prison administration for attempting to obtain morphine through threats, and reportedly stabbed an inmate.

In 1912, Stroud was sentenced to an additional six months for the attacks and transferred from McNeil Island to the federal penitentiary in Leavenworth, Kansas Inmate #8154. On March 26, 1916, he fatally stabbed a guard through the heart after the guard reprimanded him for a minor rule violation that could have prevented a visit from Stroud's younger brother. In 1918, after three trials, Stroud was sentenced to be hanged. Stroud showed no remorse for killing the guard, writing "...the guard took ill and died all of a sudden. He had a heart condition - puncture of the heart - there was a knife hole in it." In an uncommon gesture, inmates requested permission from the Warden to donate $400 to the guard's family.

Stroud's mother appealed to President Woodrow Wilson, who commuted his sentence to life imprisonment. Leavenworth's warden, T. W. Morgan, strongly opposed the decision given Stroud's reputation for violence. Morgan persuaded the President to stipulate that since Stroud was originally sentenced to await his death sentence in solitary confinement, those conditions should prevail until the halted execution could be carried out. President Wilson's Attorney General, Alexander Mitchell Palmer, saw to it that Stroud would spend the rest of his life in solitary confinement.

== Leavenworth ==
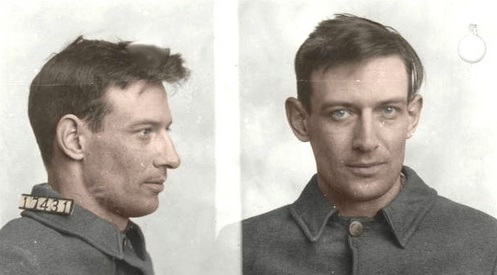
Stroud c. 1920s

While at Leavenworth in 1920, Stroud found a nest with three injured sparrows in the prison yard, and raised them to adulthood. Prisoners were sometimes allowed to buy canaries, and Stroud had started to add to his collection. He occupied his time raising and caring for his birds, which he could sell for supplies and to help support his mother. According to Stroud, he used a "razor blade and nail for tools" and made his first bird cage out of wooden crates.

Soon thereafter, Leavenworth's administration changed, and William Biddle took over as warden. Impressed with the possibility of presenting Leavenworth as a progressive rehabilitation penitentiary, Biddle furnished Stroud with cages, chemicals, and stationery to conduct his ornithological activities. Visitors were shown Stroud's aviary, and many purchased his canaries.

Over the years, he raised nearly 300 canaries in his cells. He also wrote two books, the 60,000-word treatise Diseases of Canaries (1933), which was smuggled out of Leavenworth, and a later edition, Stroud's Digest on the Diseases of Birds (1943), with updated, specific information. He made several important contributions to avian pathology, most notably a cure for the hemorrhagic septicemia family of diseases. He gained respect and also some level of sympathy in the bird-loving field.

Stroud's activities created problems for the prison management. According to regulations, each letter sent or received at the prison had to be read, copied, and approved. Stroud was so involved in his business that this alone required a full-time prison secretary. Additionally, most of the time, his birds were permitted to fly freely within his cells, and because of the great number of birds he kept, his cell was filthy.

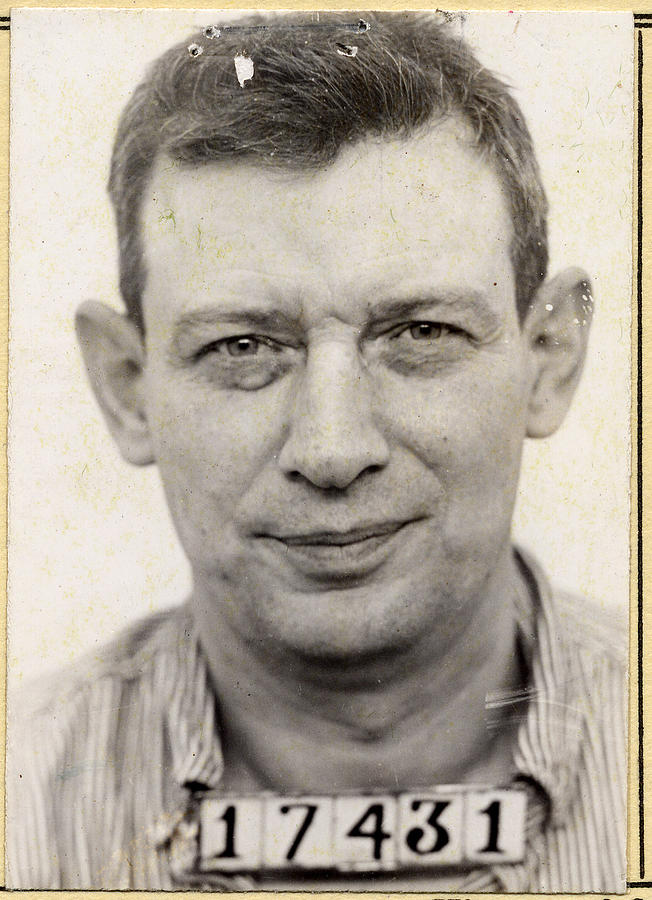
Stroud c. late 1930s

In 1931, an attempt to force Stroud to discontinue his business and get rid of his birds failed after Stroud and one of his mail correspondents, a bird researcher from Indiana named Della Mae Jones, made his story known to newspapers and magazines. A massive letter campaign and a 50,000-signature petition sent to President Herbert Hoover resulted in Stroud being permitted to keep his birds. Despite prison overcrowding, he was even given a second cell to house them. However, his letter-writing privileges were greatly curtailed. Jones and Stroud grew so close that she moved to Kansas in 1931 and started a business with him, selling his avian medicines.

Prison officials, fed up with Stroud's activities and their attendant publicity, intensified their efforts to transfer him from Leavenworth. Stroud discovered a Kansas law that forbade the transfer of prisoners married in Kansas. To this end, he married Jones by proxy, which infuriated the prison's administrators, who would not allow him to correspond with his wife.

Prison officials were not the only ones perturbed with Stroud's marriage; his mother was also incensed. They had a close relationship, but Elizabeth Stroud strongly disapproved of the marriage to Jones, believing women were nothing but trouble for her son. Whereas previously she had been a strong advocate for her son, helping him with legal battles, she now argued against his application for parole and became a major obstacle in his attempts to be released from the prison system. After moving away from Leavenworth she had no further contact with him. She died in 1938.

In 1933, Stroud advertised in a publication that he had not received any royalties from the sales of Diseases of Canaries. In retaliation, the publisher complained to the warden and, as a result, proceedings were initiated to transfer Stroud to Alcatraz, where he would not be permitted to keep his birds. In the end, Stroud was able to keep both his birds and canary-selling business at Leavenworth.

Stroud mostly avoided trouble for several more years, until it came to light that some of the equipment Stroud had requested for his lab was in fact being used as a home-made distillery to manufacture alcohol, which he used for bribes and personal consumption. Officials finally had the wedge they needed to drive Stroud out. Citing his "dangerous tendencies" and longstanding concerns about the sanitary conditions of his cell, they initiated proceedings to send him to Alcatraz.

== Alcatraz ==
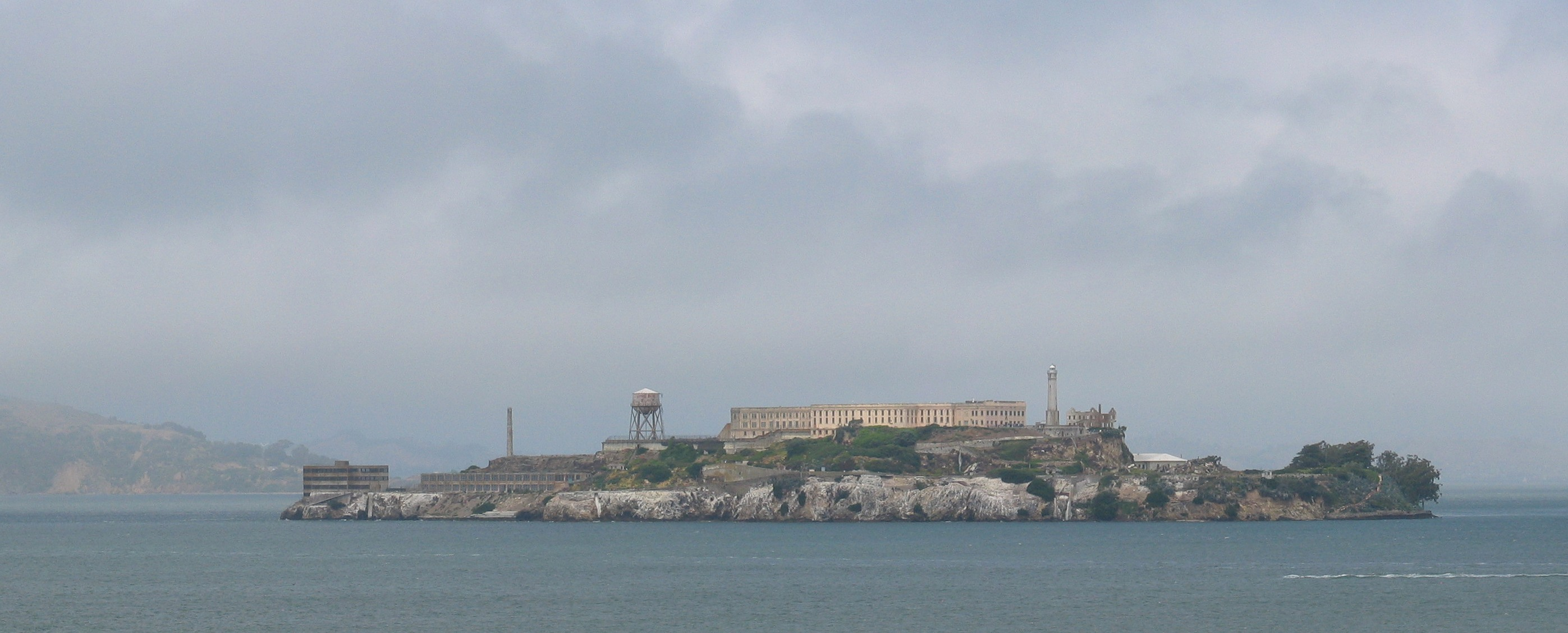
Alcatraz Prison

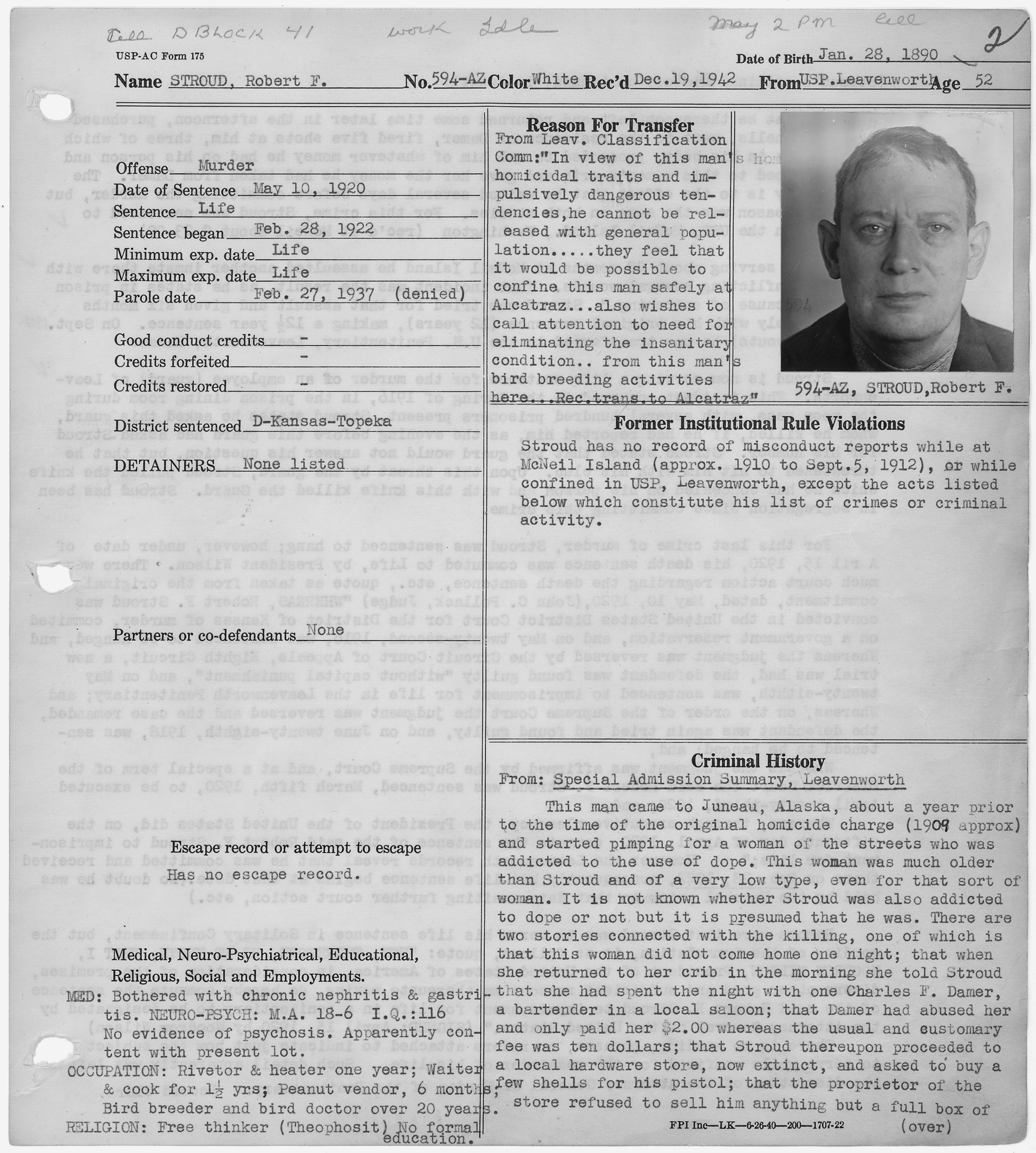
Stroud's mug shot taken in 1942 and information in the warden's notebook at Alcatraz

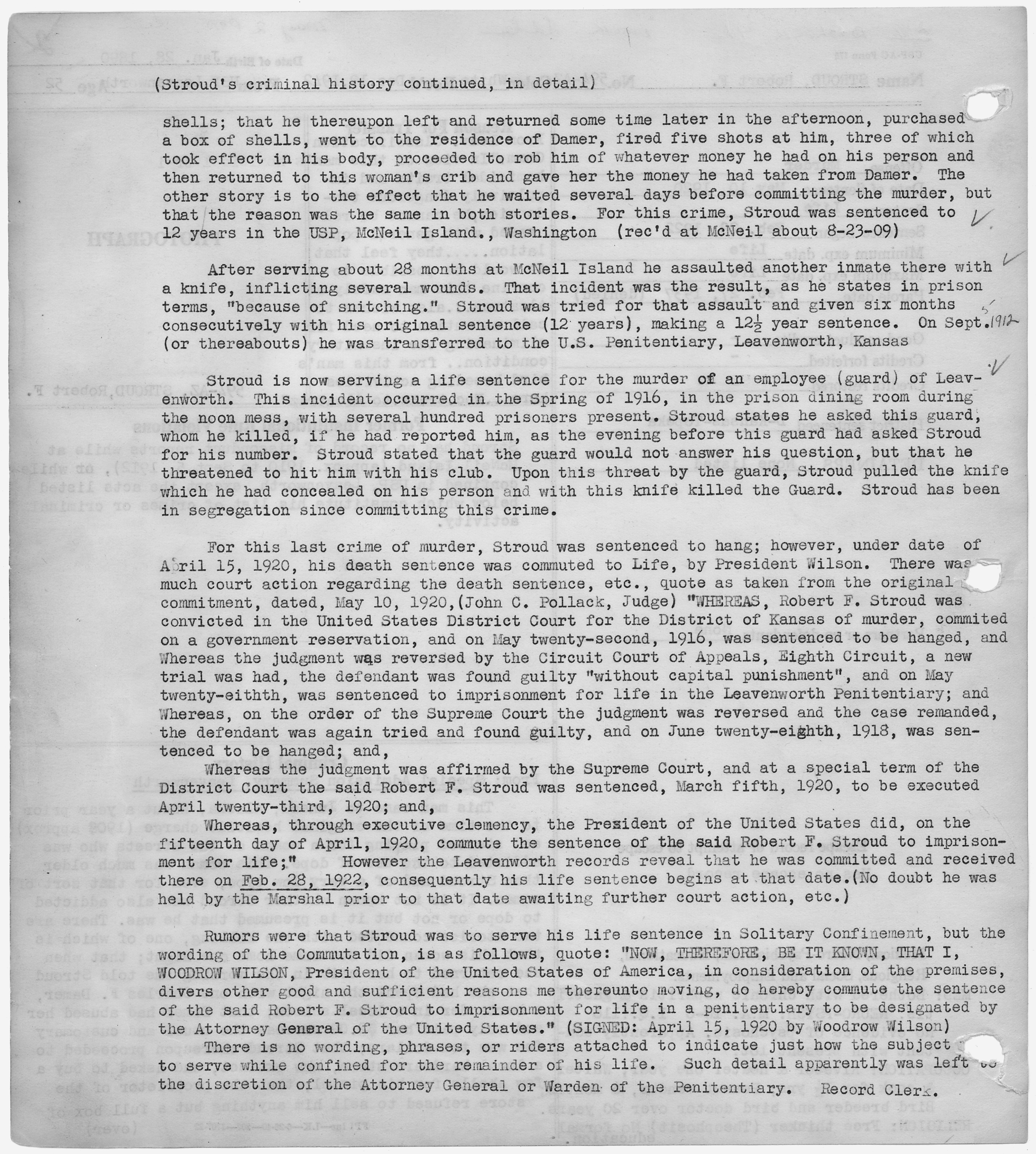
1942 Warden's notebook continued

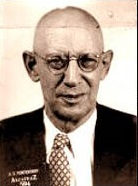
Stroud c. 1959

On December 16, 1942, Stroud was transferred to Alcatraz Federal Penitentiary and became inmate No. 594. He reportedly was not informed in advance that he was to leave Leavenworth and his beloved birds, and was given just 10 minutes' notice of his departure. His birds and equipment were sent to his brother as Alcatraz's strict policies meant that he was unable to continue his avocation. He spent six years in segregation and another 11 confined to the hospital wing at the penitentiary.

In 1943, he was assessed by psychiatrist Romney M. Ritchey, who diagnosed him as a psychopath, with an I.Q. of 112 (his initial report in 1942 based on Leavenworth states that he had an I.Q. of 116). While there, he wrote two manuscripts: Bobbie, an autobiography, and Looking Outward: A History of the U.S. Prison System from Colonial Times to the Formation of the Bureau of Prisons. A judge ruled that Stroud had the right to write and keep such manuscripts, but upheld the warden's decision to ban their publication. After Stroud's death, the transcripts were delivered to his lawyer, Richard English.

Rumors of Stroud's homosexuality were noted at Alcatraz. According to Donald Hurley, whose father was a guard at Alcatraz, "Whenever Stroud was around anyone, which was seldom, he was watched very closely, as prison officials were very aware of his overt homosexual tendencies." In an interview with Hurley for his book, a former inmate heard Stroud was always in 'dog block' (solitary confinement) or later in the hospital because he was a 'wolf' (aggressive homosexual) who had a bad temper."

Alvin Karpis, in his memoir On The Rock, stated that Stroud "had a definite mental quirk. His behavior and statements in isolation convinced me he was dangerous. I have vivid memories of his lanky form and his unusually long arms hanging low in apelike fashion and profanities and threat he uttered against the guards and their families rush to mind. His wild exclamations dwelt on how, if he were released, he would grab little boys or girls off the street, 'eat them up' and then kill them."

In February 1963 Stroud met and talked with actor Burt Lancaster, who portrayed him in The Birdman of Alcatraz. Stroud never got to see the film or read the book it was based on but did share one of the problems that prevented parole, that he was an "admitted homosexual." Lancaster quoted Stroud as saying, "Let's face it, I am 73 years old. Does that answer your question about whether I would be a dangerous homosexual?"

During his 17-year term at Alcatraz, Stroud was allowed access to the prison library and began studying law. Occasionally, he was permitted to play chess with one of the guards. Karpis noted that Stroud mastered the French language while in isolation. Stroud began petitioning the government that his long prison term amounted to cruel and unusual punishment. In 1959, with his health failing, Stroud was transferred to the Medical Center for Federal Prisoners in Springfield, Missouri, but he was never released.

== Death ==
On November 21, 1963, Robert Stroud died at the Springfield Medical Center at the age of 73, having been incarcerated for the last 54 years of his life, of which 42 were spent in solitary confinement. He was interred in the old Masonic Cemetery near Metropolis, Illinois, after a private funeral ceremony at Aikins-Farmer Funeral Home on November 25.

== Legacy ==
Stroud is considered to be one of the most notorious criminals in American history. Robert Niemi states that Stroud had a "superior intellect," and became a "first-rate ornithologist and author," but was an "extremely dangerous and menacing psychopath, disliked and distrusted by his jailers and fellow inmates." However, by his last years, Stroud's behavior had markedly improved and he was viewed more favorably; Judge Becker considered Stroud to be modest, no longer a danger to society, and as having a genuine love for birds. Carl Sifakas considers Stroud to have been a "brilliant self-taught expert on birds, and possibly the best-known example of self-improvement and rehabilitation in the U.S. prison system."

Because of Stroud's contributions to the field of ornithology, he gained a large following of thousands of bird breeders and poultry raisers who demanded his release, and for many years a "Committee to Release Robert F. Stroud" campaigned to have Stroud released from prison. However, because Stroud had killed a federal officer, his punishment in solitary confinement remained intact. In 1963, Richard M. English, a young lawyer who had campaigned for John F. Kennedy in California, took to the cause of securing Stroud's release. He met with former President Harry S. Truman to enlist support, but Truman declined. He also met with senior Kennedy administration officials who were studying the subject.

English took the last photograph of Stroud, in which he is shown with a green visor. The prison warden attempted to have English prosecuted for bringing something into the prison he did not take out: unexposed film; but the authorities declined to take any action. After Stroud's death, his personal property, including original manuscripts, was turned over to English, as his last legal representative. English later donated some of the possessions to the Audubon Society.

Stroud was the subject of a book by Thomas E. Gaddis, Birdman of Alcatraz, published in 1955. Gaddis, who strongly advocated rehabilitation in the prisons, portrayed Stroud in a favorable light. The book was adapted by Guy Trosper for the screenplay of the 1962 film of the same name, directed by John Frankenheimer. It starred Burt Lancaster as Stroud, Karl Malden as a fictionalized and renamed warden, Thelma Ritter as Stroud's mother and Betty Field as his wife, renamed Stella Johnson in the film. However, some former inmates of Alcatraz say that the real Stroud was far more sinister, dangerous and unpleasant than the fictionalized version portrayed in the book and film. One inmate said Stroud was "a vicious killer. I think Burt Lancaster owes us all an apology."

Art Carney portrayed Stroud in the 1980 TV movie Alcatraz: The Whole Shocking Story, and Dennis Farina played Stroud in the TV movie Six Against the Rock (1987), a dramatization of the 1946 Battle of Alcatraz.

In music, Stroud has been the subject of the instrumental "Birdman of Alcatraz" from Rick Wakeman's Criminal Record (1977), a concept album about criminality, and the song "The Birdman" by Our Lady Peace is also about him.
