= The Killer (Shed album) =

Studio album by Shed
- Released: 27 July 2012
- Genre: Electronic
- Length: 45:43
- Label: 50 Weapons

Shed chronology
The Traveller (2010)	The Killer (2012)

The Killer is the 2012 album by German techno musician Shed.

Professional ratings
Aggregate scores
Source	Rating
Metacritic	77/100
Review scores
Source	Rating
Resident Advisor	4/5 stars
Sputnik Music	3/5 stars
NME Magazine	8/10 stars

== Track listing ==
All tracks are written by Shed

No.	Title	Length
1.	"The Killer"	3:40
2.	"Silent Witness"	4:41
3.	"I Come By Night"	6:00
4.	"Gas Up"	1:53
5.	"Day After"	5:20
6.	"Phototype"	4:08
7.	"The Praetorian"	2:28
8.	"Ride On"	5:05
9.	"You Got the Look"	3:10
10.	"The Filler"	5:12
11.	"Follow the Leader"	4:06
