= Killer (nickname) =

As a nickname, Killer or The Killer may refer to:

== People known as Killer ==
- Pietro Aurino (born 1977), Italian former boxer
- Keegan Brown (born 1992), English darts player
- Fred Burke (1893–1940), American armed robber and contract killer
- Clive Caldwell (1910–1994), Australian World War II flying ace
- Doug Gilmour (born 1963), Canadian retired National Hockey League player
- Mack Gray (1905–1981), American actor
- Derek Hales (born 1951), English former footballer
- Kevin Kaminski (born 1969), Canadian former National Hockey League player called "Killer Kaminski"
- Arthur Kane (1949–2004), American bass guitarist for the glam rock band the New York Dolls
- Harmon Killebrew (1936–2011), American Major League Baseball player
- Katlego Mphela (born 1984), South African former footballer

== People known as The Killer ==
- Jesús Chávez (born 1972), Mexican boxer nicknamed "El Matador" ("The Killer")
- Danilo Di Luca (born 1976), professional cyclist nicknamed "The Killer from Spoltore"
- Christos Dimopoulos (born 1958), Greek retired footballer nicknamed Φονιάς ("Fonias", meaning "Killer")
- Jerry Lee Lewis (1935–2022), American rock-and-roll and country music singer/pianist
- Christiaan Lindemans (1912–1946), Dutch double agent who worked for both sides in the Second World War, known as "le Tueur" ("the Killer")

== See also ==
- Killer (disambiguation)
