= Diseases of Canaries =

Book by Robert Stroud

- Author: Robert Stroud
- Publisher: T.F.H. Publications
- Publication date: 1933
- ISBN: 9780876664360

Diseases of Canaries is a 1933 book by Robert Stroud, better known by his prison nickname of "The Bird Man of Alcatraz". He wrote it while serving a life sentence at Leavenworth Penitentiary.

Diseases of Canaries is a comprehensive work which contains much information on: Anatomy – Feeding – Feeding Experiments – Insects and Parasites – The Moult – Injuries – Septic Fever – Sepsis – Necrosis – Diarrhea – Aspergillosis – Bacteriology – Pathogenic Organisms – Drugs.

This is one of two books on canaries written by the author Robert Stroud. His other book, Stroud's Digest on the Diseases of Birds, has the same content but with some revisions and updated specific information.
