= Shed (musician) =

German musician

René Pawlowitz
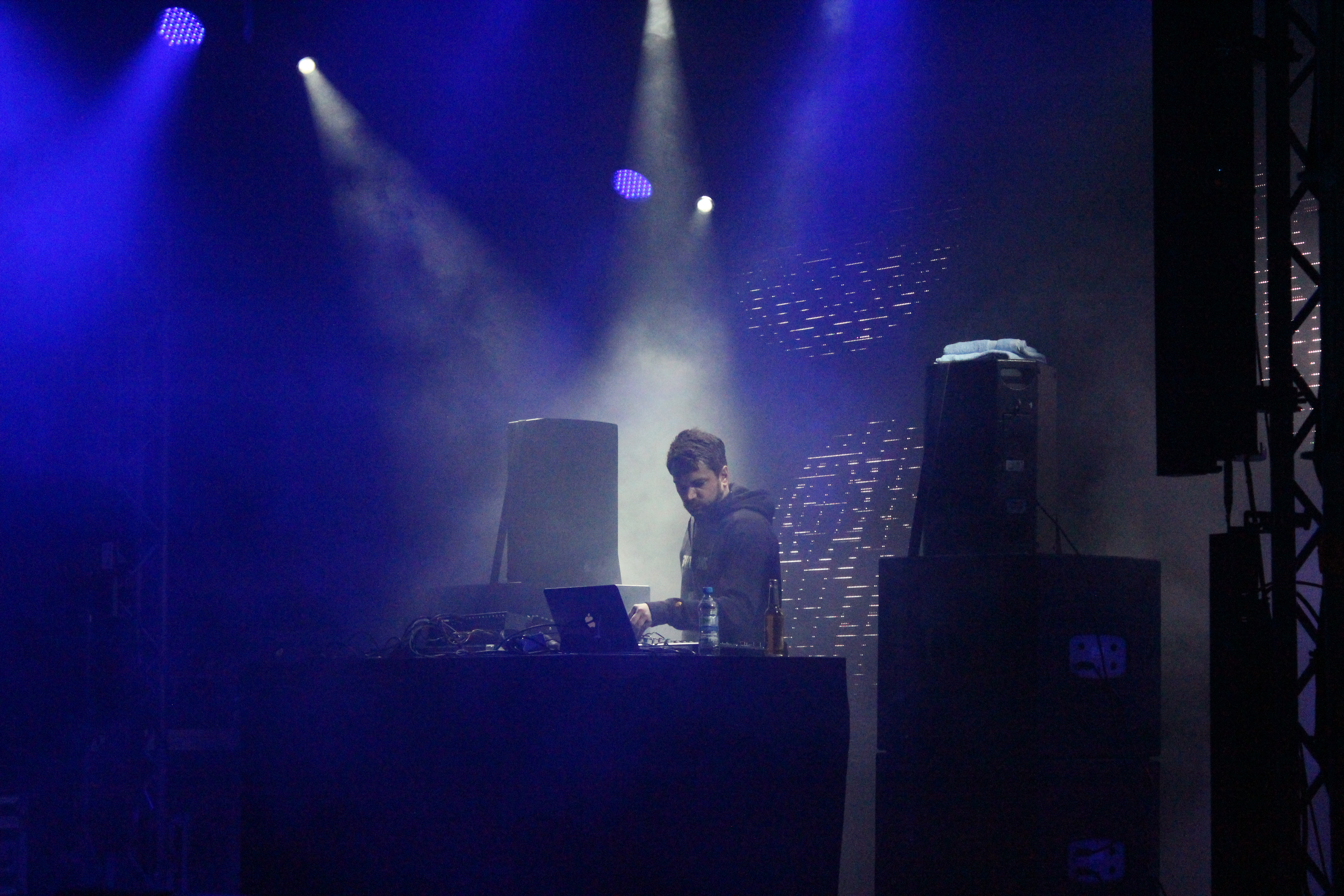
- Shed performing at Melt! music festival

Background information
- Born: 1975 (age 50–51)
- Origin: Frankfurt, Germany
- Genres: Techno, House, Breakbeat Hardcore, UK Funky
- Years active: 1996–present
- Labels: Soloaction Records, Ostgut Ton, 50 Weapons

René Pawlowitz (born 1975) is a German Berlin-based DJ and producer, better known under his techno moniker Shed. Pawlowitz also performs under various under aliases including WAX (techno), Hoover1 (breakbeat hardcore / jungle), Evil Fred (UK funky), and Head High (house).

== Life ==
René Pawlowitz was born in 1975 in the East German town of Frankfurt/Oder and grew up in Schwedt/Oder. He started producing music in the 1990s.

In 2002, he moved to Berlin and founded his own label Soloaction Records, where he released his first EP Red Planet Express as Shed in 2004. His debut album Shedding the Past was named the album of the year 2008 by Resident Advisor. In 2010 the second album The Traveller was released.

== Discography ==
=== As Shed ===
==== Albums ====
- Shedding the Past (2008)
- The Traveller (2010)
- The Killer (2012)
- The Final Experiment (2017)
- Oderbruch (2019)
- Towards East (2023)
- The 030-Files (2024)
- Rave Echoes (2026)

==== Other ====
- Deuce (EP with Marcel Dettmann, 2009)
- The Praetorian / RQ-170 (2012)
- The Dirt (2013)
- Constant Power (2014)
- Dark Planet (2015)
- No Repress but Warehouse Find (2018)
- Vertigo (2018)
- Rigger (2019)
- Applications (2024)

=== As The Traveller ===
- A100 (EP, 2012)

=== As Hoover1 ===
- Hoover1-1 (Single, 2019)
- Hoover1-2 (Single, 2019)
- Hoover1-3 (Single, 2019)
- Hoover1-4 (Single, 2020)
- Hoover1-5 (Single, 2022)
- What You Want (EP, 2024)

=== As Head High ===
- It's A Love Thing (Single, 2010)
- Rave (Dirt Mix) (Single, 2012)
- Burning (Single, 2013)
- Mega Trap (Album, 2014)
- Into It (EP, 2019)
- Home. House. Hardcore. (Album, 2021)
- Home. House. Hardcore.2 (Album, 2022)
- Break Away (Single, 2023)

=== As War Easy Made ===
- The Internecine Truth [101 808] (Single, 2012)

=== As WK7 ===
- The Avalanche (Single, 2010)
- Do It Yourself (Single, 2012)
- Washer (Single, 2015)
- Rhythm 1 (Single, 2017)

=== As WAX ===
- WAX10001 (Single, 2008)
- WAX20002 (Single, 2009)
- WAX30003 (Single, 2010)
- WAX40004 (Single, 2011)
- WAX50005 (Single, 2012)
- WAX60006 (Single, 2018)
- WAX70007 (Single, 2019)
- WAX80008 (Single, 2022)
- WAX90009 (Single, 2024)

=== As Evil Fred ===
- Get On (Single, 2013)
- The Unknown Evil EP (EP, 2021)

=== As EQD ===
- Equalized #111 (Compilation, 2011)
- Equalized #006 (Single, 2017)
- Equalized #007 (Single, 2018)
- Equalized #009 (Single, 2021)
- Equalized #010 (Single, 2023)
