= The Killers (disambiguation) =

The Killers are an American rock band from Las Vegas.

The Killers may also refer to:

== Films ==
- The Killers (1946 film), an adaptation of the Hemingway story starring Burt Lancaster and Ava Gardner
- The Killers (1956 film), a short film adaptation of the Hemingway story directed by Andrei Tarkovsky and others
- The Killers (1964 film), an adaptation of the Hemingway story starring Ronald Reagan, Angie Dickinson and Lee Marvin
- The Killers (1971 film), a feature film starring Salah Zulfikar, Nahed Sherif

== Literature ==
- "The Killers" (Hemingway short story), by Ernest Hemingway (1927)
- The Killers, a novel by George Owen Baxter (1928)
- The Killers, a novel by Daniel P. Mannix (1968)
- "The Killers" (Bukowski short story), by Charles Bukowski (1973)

== Television ==
- "The Killers", Altered Carbon season 1, episode 10 (2018)
- "The Killers", Banana Fish episode 17 (2018)
- "The Killers", Buick-Electra Playhouse episode 1 (1959)

== See also ==
- The Killer (disambiguation)
- Killer (disambiguation)
- Killers (disambiguation)
- Killing (disambiguation)
