= Killer: A Journal of Murder (film) =

A Journal of Murder
- Theatrical release poster
- Directed by: Tim Metcalfe
- Screenplay by: Tim Metcalfe
- Based on: Killer: A Journal of Murder by Thomas E. Gaddis and James O. Long
- Produced by: Janet Yang; Mark Levinson; Lisa Howard (line producer); George Linardos (associate producer); Lisa Moiselle (associate producer); Oliver Stone (executive producer); Melinda Jason (executive producer)
- Starring: James Woods; Robert Sean Leonard; Cara Buono; Ellen Greene; Robert John Burke; Steve Forrest
- Cinematography: Ken Kelsch
- Edited by: Richard Gentner
- Music by: Graeme Revell
- Production companies: Breakheart Films; Ixtlan Productions; Spelling Films
- Distributed by: Legacy Releasing
- Release dates: September 1995 (Japan); September 6, 1996 (United States)
- Running time: 91 minutes
- Country: United States
- Language: English
- Box office: $65,682

Killer: A Journal of Murder (1995) is an American drama film written and directed by Tim Metcalfe. It is loosely adapted from a book of the same title, on the life of American serial killer Carl Panzram, who was active in the early 20th century and executed in 1930. It uses some passages drawn from his own writings near the end of his life.

The film explores the relationship between Panzram (James Woods) and Henry Lesser (Robert Sean Leonard), a prison guard who believes in redemption. It premiered internationally in September 1995 at the Tokyo International Film Festival. The film was theatrically shown in the United States in 1996 through Legacy Releasing Corporation, although with limited distribution. In 1997 it was distributed by First Independent Films in the UK; in Spain, it was shown through Ufilms. In the United States, the film grossed $31,993 on its opening weekend across 9 screens. Total gross in America totaled $65,682.

== Plot ==
After repeated convictions and prison sentences for robberies and violent crimes in the early 20th century, Carl Panzram (James Woods) is serving time again at Leavenworth penitentiary for burglary. Prison guard Henry Lesser (Robert Sean Leonard), at the beginning of his career, extends kindness to him arising from his belief in reform. They develop some kind of relationship and Panzram asks Lesser for writing materials. He writes his life story, confessing to numerous murders and violent physical attacks against men and boys, accusing the circumstances of his life for his own cruelties to others.

He is encouraged by a warden who believes in rehabilitation and whom Panzram appears to like. However, his actions destroy the rehabilitation program. While granted a furlough, Panzram rapes a woman and is incarcerated again.

After recounting his life of homicide and crime, and refusing to apologize for any of it, Panzram beats a prison guard to death in an altercation. He is convicted and sentenced to death. Lesser tries to convince the condemned man to appeal by claiming insanity, but Panzram stubbornly refuses. In one scene he says, "I want out of this body, I want out of this life!"

Panzram is hanged at Leavenworth in 1930. In his last hours he refuses to appeal for clemency, and rejects a priest who comes to hear his confession. He urges the executioner to speed his preparations for the execution, saying "Hurry up, you Hoosier bastard. I could kill ten men while you're fooling around here."

Although horrified and disgusted by Panzram's crimes, Lesser is troubled by Panzram's death. Throughout the movie, Lesser's relationship with his wife Esther (Cara Buono) is briefly touched upon. He confides to her his experiences with dealing with Panzram's violent and nihilistic outlook on life. She has difficulty understanding the people her husband must deal with in his line of work.

== Cast ==
- James Woods - Carl Panzram
- Robert Sean Leonard - Henry Lesser
- Ellen Greene - Elizabeth Wyatt
- Cara Buono - Esther Lesser, Henry's wife
- Robert John Burke - R.G. Greiser
- Richard Riehle - Warden Quince
- Harold Gould - Old Henry Lesser
- John Bedford Lloyd - Dr. Karl Menninger
- Jeffrey DeMunn - Sam Lesser, Henry's younger brother
- Conrad McLaren - Judge John W. Kingman
- Steve Forrest - Warden Charles Casey
- Richard Council - Cop
- Christopher Petrosino - Richard Lesser
- Michael Jeffrey Woods - Harry Sinclair
- Rob Locke Jones - Junkie
- Raynor Scheine - Trusty
- Eddie Cairis - Young Carl Panzram
- Seth Romatelli - Teenaged Carl Panzram
- Lili Taylor - Woman in Speakeasy

== Production ==
Screenwriter Tim Metcalfe found a copy of the book Killer: A Journal of Murder (1970) by Thomas Gaddis and Joe Long, in a used-book store. It dealt most directly with Panzram's unpublished memoir about his life and his insistence on having no regret for his numerous crimes. After reading it, Metcalfe spent five years attempting to get the story onto the screen, writing his own screenplay. Metcalfe dedicated his debut film to Sam Peckinpah because his film The Wild Bunch inspired his desire to become a director. In 1999, the film was referred to in Tomorrow by Midnight, starring Alexis Arquette.

Filming locations in America included Connecticut and Rhode Island. Places within Connecticut included Groton, New London, and Norwich and Sonalysts Studios in Waterford.

== Critical reception ==
Los Angeles Times writer Kevin Thomas described the film as "powerful". He felt the film "goes beyond sending a message to illuminate a remarkable friendship". He concluded that "Woods is better than the picture, but he's so much the picture it scarcely matters."

Time Out Film Guide praised Woods's performance, noting "he's terrifyingly alive in the part". Describing the film as "tough" and "gritty", the reviewer noted that the film "never flinches from the disturbing truths Panzram represents." Richard von Busack of Metroactive praised Woods's "outstanding" performance and Metcalfe's handling of "period slang". He described Woods as being the "soul" of the film, and praised the film for maintaining "moral equilibrium without being a hand wringer". However, he disapproved of the film's flashback montages, "overly dramatic" music, and "ineffective women characters."

Bob Strauss of Los Angeles Daily News described the film as being "modest and absorbing", which "soon establishes its own hard, fascinating particulars". Although he pointed out the film's initial impression as being a "lower-budgeted" Dead Man Walking, he concluded: "We end up with an intimate knowledge of the minds of sympathetic guard Henry Lesser and the appalling - but never less than achingly human - Carl Panzram."

For Nitrate Online.com, Carrie Gorringe praised Woods' "violent and spectacular performance". Describing the film as "shocking", Gorringe commented that the film

"provided a most unpleasant set of insights into not only the psychopathology of familial abuse, but the scarifying conditions that existed in the American penal system. In an interview, Metcalfe expressed a belief that the film's emphasis is centered more upon the naivete of Lesser's liberal do-goodism and its inadequate response to the unadulterated and irremediable evil of Panzram who, in his writings, inadvertently revealed his own suspicions that he was born evil. In my opinion, this film accomplishes both tasks effortlessly."

Roger Ebert of the Chicago Sun Times praised the casting of Woods as "a good choice", praising his "powerful, searing performance". Ebert criticized the film as "less than forthcoming" about Panzram's violent past, and thought that it needed to better "humanize" his character. He summarized: "If you want to understand what's going on in Killer, see Butterfly Kiss. It will deconstruct the earlier film for you, while itself remaining opaque and disturbing - as it should."

Emanuel Levy of Variety noted the film's "obligatory sequences with stubborn inmates and cruel guards". He praised the "tightly constructed, fast-moving scenario" as being "intelligent and knowing", but added that Panzram's case was perhaps "too complex" for adaptation in this short form. Levy felt the film failed to

"dig deep enough into the formation and workings of a troubled psyche, which should have been the dramatic core. Instead, Metcalfe conveniently settles for a less ambitious task, a relationship film between two opposites."

The Spokesman-Review described the film as a "serious attempt" to portray the story of Panzram. The reviewer praised Woods' "patented, jangle-nerved performance", but was critical of Metcalfe's "inability to make a cogent statement about the death penalty, pro or con." Walter Addiego of the San Francisco Examiner described the film as an "earnest and often striking drama". Although he felt the film was "a bit simplistic", he praised the film's "affecting turns on the theme of human redemption", as well as Woods's and Leonard's performances.

Mick LaSalle of the San Francisco Chronicle criticized the film's focus on the relationship between Panzram and Lesser, which he felt made for a "series of rather static encounters". He believed that the script did not delve deeply enough into the real story of the serial killer, resulting in a "lightweight effort". However, he praised Woods as being "always fun to watch", with "a couple of inspired moments." Michael Janusonis of Providence Journal praised the "good performances" of the two leading actors; however, he criticized the film's lack of "depth and flashiness and snappy pacing needed for it to score high with audiences and most critics."

PrisonMovies.net said that, without Lesser's "sympathetic treatment" of Panzram, there was "little to keep you interested in either man". The reviewer noted the film's "quaintly nostalgic feel of a Depression-era prison". He questioned the basic story of the film:

"If Panzram has no redeeming features both men could be readily dismissed; the inmate as a monster and his keeper as a fool. And that's where the problem lies, if you look at the real-life story, Panzram killed for no reason. If we knew this, when James Woods goes willingly to the gallows, claiming a victory for justice, none of us would ask - as Lesser seemingly does and notwithstanding all that we have seen - whether there is the slightest bit in him worth saving."

Movie-Vault.com compared the film to The Shawshank Redemption, commenting that the former film had more spirit and stronger morals than Killer. The reviewer felt the film relied on Woods's performance for support, which "entirely fails". The reviewer says that Woods "lends no likeability or believability or characteristic traits to this man he is portraying, and in the end he comes across as a pointless incarnation of a man whose life, perhaps, never even merited the Hollywood treatment in the first place."

== Other versions ==
In the United States, the film was first released on VHS; in the Netherlands via Arcade Movie Company. It was released on DVD in 1998 in Japan via Beam Entertainment and Culture Publishers. On VHS it was released in Canada via Malofilm Distribution, in Greece via Nea Kinisi Video, in Germany via VCL Communications, and in Brazil via Top Tape. In 1997 it was given a VHS release in America via Republic Pictures, who also released a DVD version in 2001 and a widescreen DVD edition in 2006.
