= Never the Right Time =

Studio album by Andy Stott
- Released: 16 April 2021
- Genre: Electronic
- Length: 40:32
- Label: Modern Love

Andy Stott chronology
| It Should Be Us (2019) | Never the Right Time (2021) |

Never the Right Time is a studio album by British record producer Andy Stott. It was released on 16 April 2021 through Modern Love. It received generally favorable reviews from critics.

== Background ==
Andy Stott is a British record producer based in Manchester. Never the Right Time is his first release of music since It Should Be Us (2019). It consists of nine tracks. It features vocal contributions from Alison Skidmore, who is Stott's former piano teacher and frequent collaborator. A music video was released for the track "Hard to Tell". The album was released on 16 April 2021 through Modern Love.

== Critical reception ==
Professional ratings
Aggregate scores
| Source | Rating |
|---|---|
| Metacritic | 74/100 |
Review scores
| Source | Rating |
| AllMusic | 4/5 stars |
| Beats Per Minute | 67% |
| Exclaim! | 7/10 |
| The Line of Best Fit | 8/10 |
| Loud and Quiet | 7/10 |
| Pitchfork | 6.0/10 |
| PopMatters | 8/10 |
| Sputnikmusic | 3.5/5 |

According to the review aggregator Metacritic, Never the Right Time received "generally favorable reviews" based on a weighted average score of 74 out of 100 from 8 critic scores.

Woody Delaney of Loud and Quiet commented that "The LP's nine songs move at an unhurried pace and will likely be enjoyed most by those who favour solitary, late-night headphone sessions." Andy Kellman of AllMusic stated, "Where It Should Be Us stimulated vigorous movement with juddering house and scrambled juke tracks, Never the Right Time is much lighter in touch, if heavier in emotions that seem unresolved."

Brian Howe of Pitchfork wrote, "While the tracks have many pleasant modulations and evocative riffs, they seldom feel like they'd fall apart without our rapt attention holding them up." Liam Inscoe-Jones of The Quietus commented that "There were two possible directions from the signature sound which made Stott's name: hard industrial techno, and a kind of sleepwalk into dreariness." He added, "Sadly, this record settles on the latter."

=== Accolades ===
Year-end lists for Never the Right Time
| Publication | List | Rank | Ref. |
|---|---|---|---|
| PopMatters | The 20 Best Electronic Albums of 2021 | 9 | |
| The Quietus | Quietus Albums of the Year 2021 | 53 | |

== Track listing ==
All lyrics are written by Alison Skidmore.

Never the Right Time track listing
| No. | Title | Length |
|---|---|---|
| 1. | "Away Not Gone" | 5:27 |
| 2. | "Never the Right Time" | 4:55 |
| 3. | "Repetitive Strain" | 4:17 |
| 4. | "Don't Know How" | 4:59 |
| 5. | "When It Hits" | 1:23 |
| 6. | "The Beginning" | 4:30 |
| 7. | "Answers" | 4:49 |
| 8. | "Dove Stone" | 5:31 |
| 9. | "Hard to Tell" | 4:41 |
| Total length: | | 40:32 |

== Personnel ==
Credits adapted from liner notes.

- Andy Stott
- Alison Skidmore – vocals
- Kurt Hutton – photography
