= Birdman of Alcatraz (film) =

1962 film by John Frankenheimer

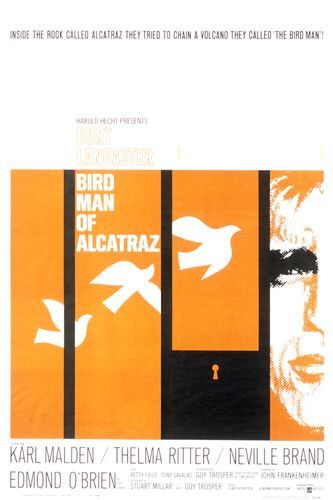
- Theatrical release poster by Saul Bass
- Directed by: John Frankenheimer
- Screenplay by: Guy Trosper
- Based on: Birdman of Alcatraz (1955 book) by Thomas E. Gaddis
- Produced by: Harold Hecht; Stuart Millar; Guy Trosper
- Starring: Burt Lancaster; Karl Malden; Thelma Ritter; Neville Brand; Edmond O'Brien; Telly Savalas
- Cinematography: Burnett Guffey
- Edited by: Edward Mann
- Music by: Elmer Bernstein
- Production company: Norma Productions
- Distributed by: United Artists
- Release date: July 3, 1962
- Running time: 143 minutes
- Country: United States
- Language: English
- Budget: $2.6 million
- Box office: $3 million (US/Canada)

Birdman of Alcatraz is a 1962 American biographical prison drama film directed by John Frankenheimer and starring Burt Lancaster, Karl Malden, Thelma Ritter, Neville Brand, Edmond O'Brien and Telly Savalas. It was adapted by Guy Trosper from the 1955 book by Thomas E. Gaddis.

The film is a largely fictionalized version of the life of Robert Stroud, who was sentenced to solitary confinement after having killed a prison guard. A federal prison inmate, he became known as the "Birdman of Alcatraz" because of his studies of birds, which had taken place when he was incarcerated at Leavenworth Prison in Kansas, where he was allowed to keep birds in jail. Although known as "The Birdman of Alcatraz", Stroud was never allowed to keep any birds after his transfer to Alcatraz Federal Penitentiary in California in 1942.

Birdman of Alcatraz was released by United Artists on July 3, 1962. It was well-received by critics, and received four nominations at the 35th Academy Awards, including Best Actor (for Lancaster), Best Supporting Actor (for Savalas), and Best Supporting Actress (for Ritter). Lancaster also won a BAFTA Award and a Volpi Cup for his performance.

== Plot ==
Robert Stroud is imprisoned as a young man for committing a murder in Alaska. He is shown as a rebellious inmate, fighting against a rigid prison system; while being transported with other prisoners by train, he breaks open the window to allow the suffocating inmates to breathe.

He comes into conflict with Harvey Shoemaker, warden of Leavenworth Prison.

While in jail, Stroud learns that his mother tried to visit him, but was denied and told to return later in the week. Outraged, he attacks a guard, fatally stabbing him. Stroud is sentenced to death, but his mother runs a successful campaign to have his sentence commuted to life in prison. The sentence requires him to serve in solitary confinement for the rest of his life.

While in the exercise yard during a heavy rainstorm, Stroud finds a downed nest holding an orphaned baby sparrow. He takes care of the bird, and starts a trend. Some other convicts and he acquire and care for birds, such as canaries, given from outside sources.

Stroud develops a collection of birds and cages. When the birds fall ill, he conducts experiments and comes up with a cure. Stroud is visited by bird-lover Stella Johnson and agrees to go into business, marketing his bird remedies. Stella and he later marry, but his mother disapproves, causing a permanent rift between mother and son. She further disowns him by refusing to support his release petition.

As the years pass, Stroud becomes an expert on bird diseases and publishes a book on the subject. His writings are so impressive that a doctor describes him as a "genius".

He is abruptly transferred to the federal penitentiary at Alcatraz, a new maximum-security institution where he is not permitted to keep birds. Although growing elderly, he remains independent, writing a critical history of the U.S. penal system that is suppressed by Shoemaker, then warden of Alcatraz.

Still at odds with authority, Stroud helps end a prison rebellion in 1946 by throwing out the two firearms acquired by the convicts. He assures the authorities that they can re-enter the premises without risk of being shot. Shoemaker acknowledges Stroud never lied to him and takes him at his word.

After a petition campaign by admirers, Stroud is eventually transferred to a much more prisoner friendly prison in Missouri. During the move, he meets several reporters and displays a range of knowledge on contemporary subjects far beyond birds. He meets author Thomas E. Gaddis, who wrote a book based on his life. Shortly afterwards, the narrator closes the story reflecting that, as of the film's release time following 24 years of denied parole bids, Stroud, now 72, had spent 53 years in prison (he would ultimately spend 54 years, dying still incarcerated at 73).

== Cast ==
- Burt Lancaster as Robert Stroud
- Karl Malden as Harvey Shoemaker
- Thelma Ritter as Elizabeth McCartney Stroud
- Neville Brand as Bull Ransom
- Betty Field as Stella Johnson
- Telly Savalas as Feto Gomez
- Edmond O'Brien as Thomas E. Gaddis
- Hugh Marlowe as Albert Comstock
- Whit Bissell as Dr. Ellis
- Crahan Denton as Kramer
- James Westerfield as Jess Younger

== Production ==
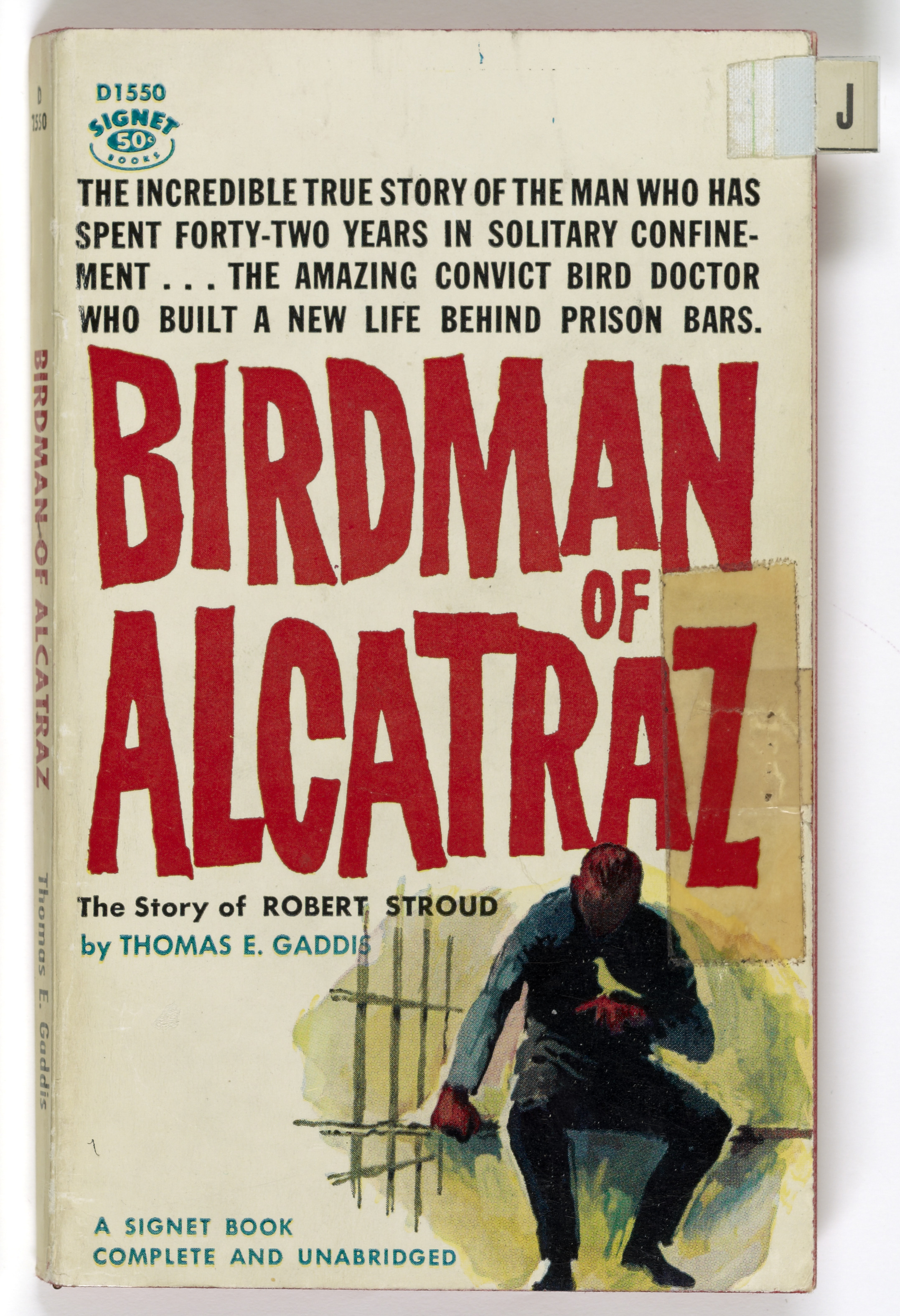
The film was based on Thomas E. Gaddis' 1955 biography of Robert Stroud, Birdman of Alcatraz

=== Development ===
British director Charles Crichton was picked for this film and his United States debut, but he clashed with Lancaster and was replaced by Frankenheimer. According to actor Strother Martin, "I had a nice role in Birdman of Alcatraz. They fired the original director, Charles Crichton, and I went out with him. I was replaced by Leo Penn who was eventually cut out of the picture entirely." Despite the title being The Birdman of Alcatraz, Stroud never kept any birds during his time in Alcatraz prison, but rather during his time incarcerated at Leavenworth Prison from 1912 to 1942.

The film was made despite the protests of James V. Bennett, director of the Federal Bureau of Prisons. During a visit to Washington in July 1961, Gaddis was unsuccessful in trying to meet with Bennett, given Bennett's views on the film which he deplored because "it is simply not our policy to glamorize criminals". Bennett approached Twentieth-Century Fox, the studio which had optioned the book, and told them he did not want the film to be produced, in response to which the studio ended their involvement. Producers had to make changes to the script at the behest of the United States Navy and the United States Army in order to receive co-operation in producing the film. Producer Harold Hecht took little notice of the federal pressures, suggesting he would even ask for permission to film at Alcatraz.

=== Casting ===
Burt Lancaster was cast in the lead role of Robert Stroud. Maurie Siegel, who was responsible for the film's publicity, noted that Lancaster "gave up eight months of his life to the picture" and that he gave up a million dollars in lost opportunities from other engagements, to ensure the film was done how he wanted it. Lancaster's mild-mannered portrayal of Stroud was starkly different to the real life persona of Robert Stroud, who author Jolene Babyak compared to being more like Ted Bundy and suggested that cures he promoted for birds were actually potentially lethal.

On being cast as Feto Gomez, Telly Savalas said he "was in awe" of Lancaster, despite saying he was never nervous when interviewing famous figures including Harry Truman and Dwight Eisenhower. He recalled how "I couldn't catch my breath in the presence of Burt Lancaster", who he credited as launching his career and remained among Savalas' favorite performers.

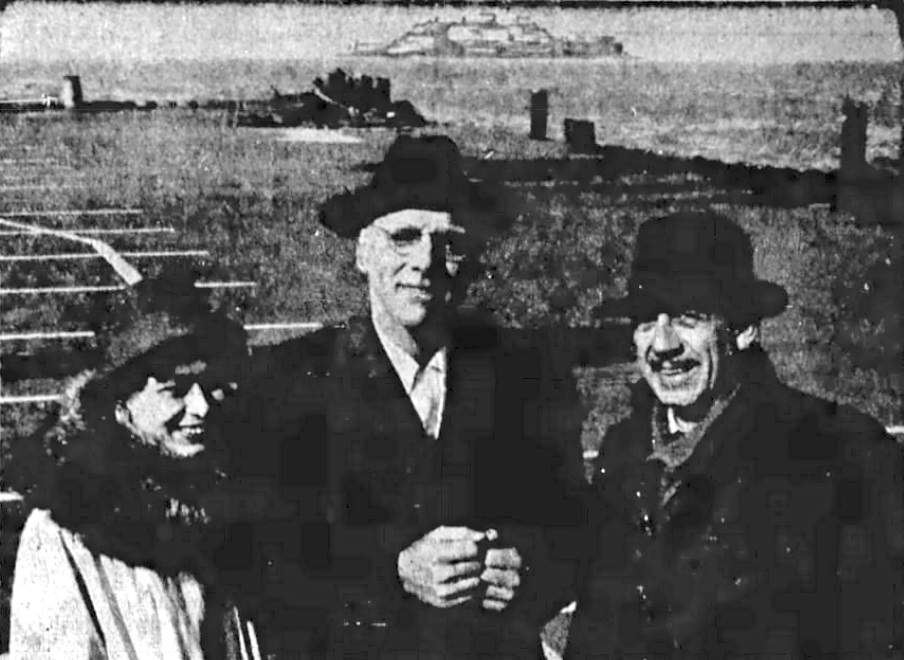
Burt Lancaster pictured with Martha Gaddis and Thomas E Gaddis during filming of Birdman of Alcatraz, February 1961

Gaddis was originally tested to play himself in the film, though experts suggested that the illusion is lost if someone plays themself and the role ultimately went to Edmond O'Brien. O'Brien studied the mannerisms of Gaddis to try to replicate them and even reluctantly smoked the same cigarillos, although he hoped that his scenes would not take too long so that he would be able to stop smoking. Gaddis worked in capacity of technical advisor on the film and attended set every day. He emphasized that "the film won't gloss over the facts of Stroud's criminal history", hoping that the film would get him released from prison, as the book got him transferred from Alcatraz prison.

=== Filming ===
The movie began filming during the fall of 1960 under the working title of The Man from Alcatraz. Lancaster began filming after concluding his previous movie A Matter of Principle. As shooting was not permitted within Alcatraz itself, the sets were constructed within two buildings situated at Columbia Studios. For the prison laundrette scene which lasts for around 90 seconds, an entire steam laundry from 1914 was brought on set, complete with all piping and machinery which was operational. For scenes in Stroud's isolation cell, the small set size meant that the movie camera required around a third of the amount of available space.

The movie features many birds being friendly around Lancaster, to which he explained they had been specially trained by two men brought on to the set from Japan. Lancaster advised that on some days, they would "get a scene with the birds right off", yet other times it may take an entire day, suggesting that the short concentration span of the birds would mean they could entirely forget what they needed to do and therefore had to be retrained. Hollywood animal trainer Ray D. Berwick was among the bird trainers in the film. The cages were recreated from cigar boxes by skilled carpenters over a period of many hours, according to Martha Gaddis.

=== Post-production ===
Gaddis served as technical director for the filming of his book and spent all his time on the film set from September 1960. Unlike Lancaster, who requested that he remain on set at all times to ensure an accurate portrayal of his character, Gaddis was "eager to be released" after 6 months on set.

In publicizing the film, Lancaster went on a cross-country tour. When in San Francisco at the Mark Hopkins Hotel, he invited questions from journalists about Robert Stroud. At the press conference, Lancaster made his views clear that he believed Stroud should be released, even offering to visit Washington to try to use his influence to help the cause. When asked by an interviewer if some of the film's profits would be used to help fund Stroud's release, Lancaster shouted at him, "You're nothing but a ****, a ****."

Warden James F. Maroney declined United Artists' invitation to show the film in Alcatraz to inmates, after a special screening was set up for him and three of his staff. In explaining his reasons, Maroney said that "prison life is always fascinating to people who never have been confined in a prison." He went on to say that he and his staff "found the film interesting and occasionally, but not always, realistic", but suggested that the inmates would prefer to watch entertainment that distracts them from their environment, rather than one which reminds them of their current one.

== Release ==
The film opened at theaters on July 3, 1962, in Los Angeles before expanding to the entire country.

== Reception ==
=== Critical response ===
Contemporary reviews of the film were positive.

Philip K. Scheuer of the Eugene Register-Guard praised it as "one of the finest pieces of film-making to come out of Hollywood in many a disappointing day", describing Lancaster's performance as "an astonishing tour de force". In discussing the film's prison setting, Variety wrote, "Birdman reverses the formula and brings a new breadth and depth to the form." A. H. Weiler of The New York Times called it "a thoughtful yet powerful portrait that cleaves to the heart and mind despite its omissions".

Some former inmates who knew Stroud criticized the film's portrayal of the man. Former Alcatraz inmate Glenn Williams said that Stroud "was not a sweetheart; he was a vicious killer. I think Burt Lancaster owes us all an apology." Another former convict, Jim Quillan, described the real Stroud as a "jerk", and as "a guy that liked chaos and turmoil and upheaval... Always at somebody else's expense".

Rotten Tomatoes reports that 88% of 24 surveyed critics, both contemporaneous and modern, gave the film a positive review; the average rating is 7.2/10. Metacritic, which uses a weighted average, assigned the film a score of 76 out of 100, based on 7 critics, indicating "generally favorable" reviews.

=== Awards and nominations ===
Ceremony	Category	Nominee(s)	Result	Ref.
35th Academy Awards	Best Actor	Burt Lancaster	Nominated	
35th Academy Awards	Best Supporting Actor	Telly Savalas	Nominated	
35th Academy Awards	Best Supporting Actress	Thelma Ritter	Nominated	
35th Academy Awards	Best Cinematography – Black-and-White	Burnett Guffey	Nominated	
16th British Academy Film Awards	Best Foreign Actor	Burt Lancaster	Won	
15th Directors Guild of America Awards	Outstanding Directorial Achievement in Motion Pictures	John Frankenheimer	Nominated	
20th Golden Globe Awards	Best Actor in a Motion Picture – Drama	Burt Lancaster	Nominated	
20th Golden Globe Awards	Best Supporting Actor – Motion Picture	Telly Savalas	Nominated	
1963 Laurel Awards	Top Drama		Nominated	
1963 Laurel Awards	Top Male Dramatic Performance	Burt Lancaster	Nominated	
1963 Laurel Awards	Top Female Supporting Performance	Thelma Ritter	Nominated	
1962 National Board of Review Awards	Top Ten Films		9th Place	
23rd Venice International Film Festival	Golden Lion	John Frankenheimer	Nominated	
23rd Venice International Film Festival	Best Actor	Burt Lancaster	Won	
23rd Venice International Film Festival	San Giorgio Prize	John Frankenheimer	Won	
15th Writers Guild of America Awards	Best Written American Drama	Guy Trosper	Nominated	

The film is recognized by American Film Institute in these lists:

- 2006: AFI's 100 Years...100 Cheers – #76

== See also ==
- List of American films of 1962
