= The Killer (2024 soundtrack) =

The Killer (Original Motion Picture Soundtrack)

Film score by Marco Beltrami
- Released: August 23, 2024
- Recorded: May 2024
- Studio: Abbey Road Studios, London; Pianella Studios, Malibu, California
- Genre: Film score
- Length: 59:25
- Label: Back Lot Music
- Producer: Buck Sanders

Marco Beltrami chronology
Silent Night (2023)	The Killer (2024)	The Unholy Trinity (2025)

The Killer (Original Motion Picture Soundtrack) is the film score to the 2024 film The Killer directed by John Woo, a remake of his own 1989 Hong Kong film with Nathalie Emmanuel and Omar Sy in the lead roles. The film score is composed by Marco Beltrami and released through Lakeshore Records on August 23, 2024.

== Development ==
Marco Beltrami renewed his collaboration with John Woo after scoring the director's previous Silent Night (2023). Describing it an "inspired" collaboration, he considered the film as "an unusually romantic and fun way" to score action sequences similar to a ballet. The hospital shootout scene was the first to be scored that demanded an extensive collaboration between Beltrami and editor Zach Staenberg. The sequence utilizes jazz elements. Beltrami composed a whistling theme for the protagonist and instead of working on a huge orchestra, Beltrami went ahead with a smaller orchestra, representing strings and drum kits, for a raw and energetic feel. The score often emphasizes Spaghetti Western influences. It was recorded at the Abbey Road Studios in May 2024.

== Release ==
The score was released through Back Lot Music on August 23, 2024.

== Reception ==
David Ehrlich of IndieWire wrote "the horny saxophone that Marco Beltrami's score uses to inject actual jazz into the middle of an exuberantly staged hospital shootout [...] celebrate the fun of playing". Matthew Donato of Collider wrote "Marco Beltrami's highpoint score tries to add some zip with jazzy woodwind rhythms, but visuals lag behind musical peppiness". Nick Rogers of Midwest Film Journal called it a "shrewdly peppy score". Maxance Vincent of FilmSpeak wrote "Marco Beltrami's Ennio Morricone-inspired score, [gives] the remake the Western quality Woo always enjoys tipping the hat to." However, Alex Maidy of JoBlo.com called it a "generic score".

== Track listing ==
No.	Title	Artist(s)	Length
1.	"Zee Awakens"		3:01
2.	"Candles for the Dead"		2:08
3.	"Chasing Coco"		1:32
4.	"Serge's Last Dance"		2:01
5.	"Bar Fight"		2:13
6.	"Tessier's Shop"		0:29
7.	"Poison IV"		1:08
8.	"After Noone"		1:50
9.	"Not a Plain Heist"		1:38
10.	"No One's Whore"		1:11
11.	"Paris By E-Bike"		1:57
12.	"Hospital Treatment"		2:58
13.	"Morgue Shootout"		1:38
14.	"Zee's Apartment"		2:01
15.	"Fork You"		1:12
16.	"Takeout Stakeout"		1:28
17.	"Queen of the Dead"		1:21
18.	"Martini Murder"		1:23
19.	"Finn's Ratchet"		3:36
20.	"Flower Mart"		3:40
21.	"How's That for a Chip"		2:17
22.	"Candles for the Deserved"		0:52
23.	"Graveyard Shootout"		1:16
24.	"The Church"		1:14
25.	"Kick Ass Mass"		3:10
26.	"Zee's Reckoning"		3:32
27.	"Vision Regained"		1:25
28.	"Sey Goodbye"		0:54
29.	"Killer Reborn"		1:12
30.	"Introuvable"	Jorane	2:38
31.	"Let's Live for Today"	Diana Silvers	2:30
Total length:			59:25

== Personnel ==
Credits adapted from Beltrami's official website and liner notes:

- Music composer: Marco Beltrami
- Music producer: Buck Sanders
- Music editor: Joe E. Rand
- Orchestrator: Mark Graham, Pete Anthony, Jon Kull
- Conductor: Marco Beltrami
- Music preparation: JoAnn Kane Music Service
- Librarian: Dakota Music Service
- Recording engineer: John Barrett
- Recording studio: Abbey Road Studios
- Mixing engineer: Tyson Lozensky
- Mixing studio: Pianella Studios
- Additional engineer: Lewis Jones
- Score recordist: Chris Parker
- Assistant engineers: Neil Dawes, Martin Riley
- Orchestra and vocal contractor: Isobel Griffiths Ltd.
- Orchestra leader: Thomas Bowes
- Vocal contractor: Ben Parry
- Piano: Andy Massey
- Solo saxophone: Martin Williams
- Solo trumpet: Tom Rees-Roberts
- Solo jazz bass: Rory Dempsey
- Solo cello: Tim Gill
- Solo soprano: Grace Davidson
- Drums: Hayden Beltrami
- Whistler: Matthew Paris

== Accolades ==
Awards	Date of ceremony	Category	Recipient(s) and nominee(s)	Result	Ref.
Hollywood Music in Media Awards	November 20, 2024	Original Score – TV/Streamed Movie	Marco Beltrami	Nominated	
International Film Music Critics Association	February 27, 2025	Best Original Score for an Action/Adventure Film	Marco Beltrami	Nominated	
