= Killers =

Killers may refer to:

== Films and television ==
- Killers (2000 film), a BBC Television off-drama written by David Rock
- Killers (2003 film), a compilation of five short films by Japanese directors
- Killers (2010 film), an action comedy film directed by Robert Luketic
- Killers (2014 film), a psychological thriller film directed by the Mo Brothers
- "Killers" (The Gentle Touch), a 1980 television episode

== Music ==
- Killers (metal band), a British heavy metal band formed in 1991, led by Paul Di'Anno
- The Killers, an American rock band formed in 2001, led by Brandon Flowers

=== Albums ===
- Killers (Iron Maiden album), a 1981 album from British heavy metal band Iron Maiden and its title track
- Killers (Kiss album), a 1982 album from the American hard rock band Kiss

=== Songs ===
- "Killers", a song by Iron Maiden from the 1981 album of the same name
- "Killers", a song by Kings of Convenience from the 2021 album Peace or Love
- "Killers", a song by Motörhead from the 2004 album Inferno
- "Killers", a song by Pantera from the 1984 album Projects in the Jungle
- "Killers", a song by Tygers of Pan Tang from the 1980 album Wild Cat

== See also ==
- The Killers (disambiguation)
- "Killerz", an episode of Law & Order
- Killer (disambiguation)
