= Killer: A Journal of Murder =

1970 book about Carl Panzram

- Author: Thomas E. Gaddis [James O. Long
- Language: English
- Genre: Biography
- Publisher: Macmillan
- Publication date: 1970
- Publication place: United States
- Media type: Print (Hardback and Paperback)
- Pages: 388 pp (Hardcover edition)
- ISBN: 978-1878923141

Killer: A Journal of Murder (1970) is a biography of American serial killer Carl Panzram (1892–1930), co-written by Thomas E. Gaddis and James O. Long.

== Plot ==
The book explores American serial killer Carl Panzram's life inside the American prison system, in addition to the circumstances of the many murders he committed. Henry Lesser was a young jail guard at the Washington, DC district jail when Panzram arrived for incarceration in 1928. After hearing of Panzram's harsh imprisonment, Lesser befriends him and convinces him to write a biography. Forty years after the execution of Panzram, Lesser found a writer for a book that would contain Panzram's writing and the circumstances of Panzram's many incarcerations over the course of his life.

== Film adaptation ==
The book was adapted as a film by the same name and released in 1996. It starred James Woods as Carl Panzram and Robert Sean Leonard as Henry Lesser.

== Panzram's work ==
Panzram had written a memoir, and the authors drew from his manuscript in their account. Panzram's autobiography was much longer. The manuscript was donated by Henry Lesser, a jail guard in the District of Columbia, who got to know Panzram during his first incarceration, beginning in 1928. In 1980 Lesser donated Panzram's autobiography and other papers to San Diego State University, where they are housed, as the "Carl Panzram papers," in the Malcolm A. Love Library.
