= Thomas E. Gaddis =

American author

- Born: Thomas Eugene Gaddis; September 14, 1908; Denver, Colorado
- Died: October 10, 1984 (age 76); Portland, Oregon
- Occupation: Author
- Known for: Birdman of Alcatraz

Thomas Eugene Gaddis (September 14, 1908 – October 10, 1984) was an American writer most noted for his biography, Birdman of Alcatraz (1955), about convicted murderer Robert Stroud. It was adapted as a 1962 film of the same name, starring Burt Lancaster.

== Early life and education ==
Gaddis was born in Denver, Colorado, and attended local schools before college.

== Career ==
In his early career, Gaddis served seven years as a Los Angeles probation officer and taught adult classes at night school for around 12 years. He wrote many non-fiction books, mostly biographies.

=== Birdman of Alcatraz ===
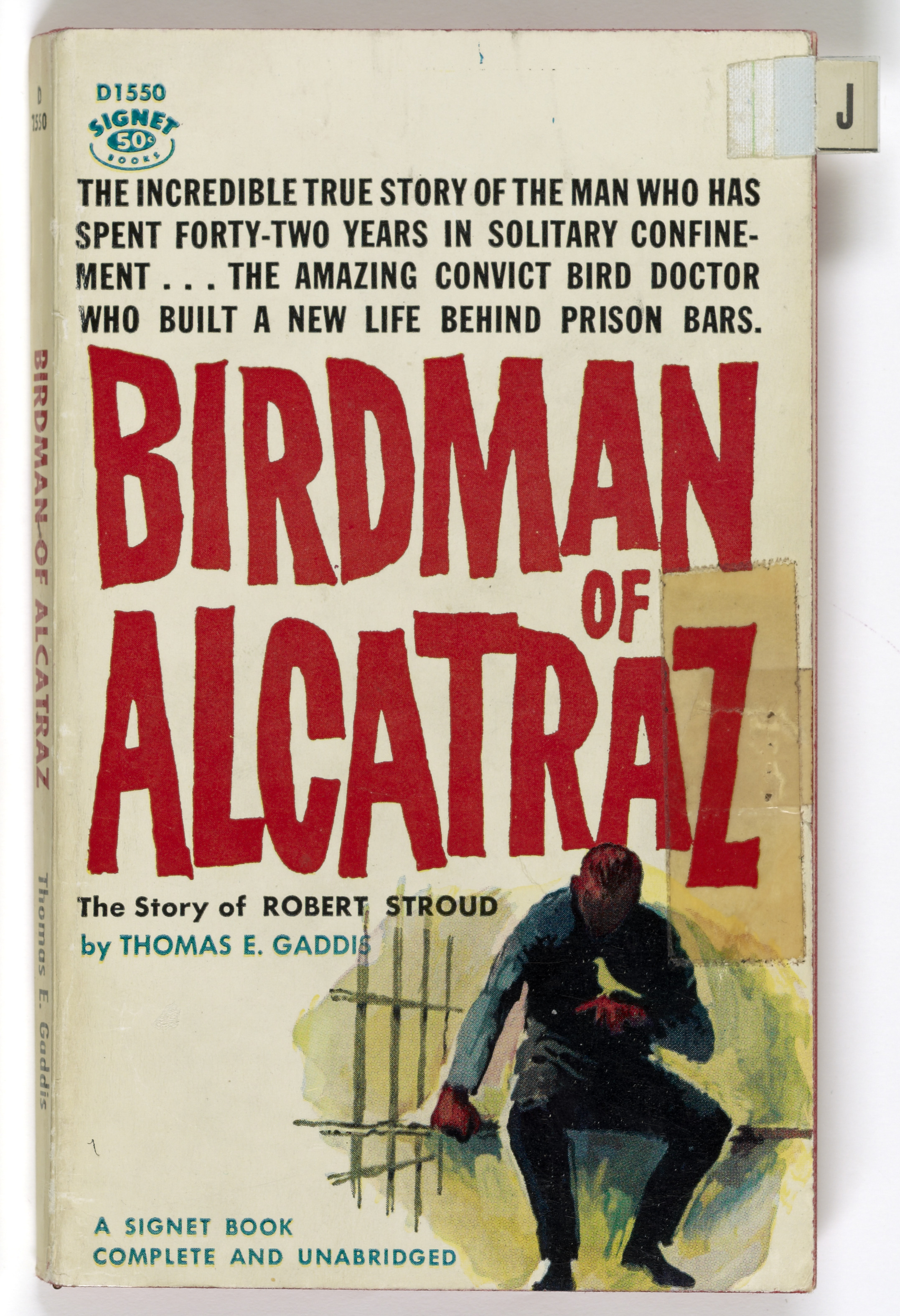
Birdman of Alcatraz, 1955, by Gaddis

Gaddis published Birdman of Alcatraz in 1955, for which he was well-known. It is considered one of the nation's notable prison biographies. He explored the life of Robert Stroud, a grandson of a federal judge. Stroud was convicted of murder in Alaska and first sentenced to Leavenworth Federal prison in Kansas. After stabbing a guard to death in prison, Stroud was sentenced to life imprisonment in solitary confinement.

While in solitary in Leavenworth, Stroud became an expert on birds. He cared for them in his cell and learned independently about how to treat their diseases. He wrote Stroud's Digest of the Diseases of Birds in Leavenworth from 1939 to 1941. After he was transferred to Alcatraz, he was not allowed to keep any birds.

Gaddis's book was loosely adapted as the 1962 film Birdman of Alcatraz, starring Burt Lancaster as Stroud. Gaddis was portrayed by Edmond O'Brien.

Gaddis is known for the following quote:

"Alcatraz, the federal prison with a name like the blare of a trombone, is a black molar in the jawbone of the nation's prison system."

=== Subsequent work ===
Gaddis subsequently worked as an educator at Reed College from 1962 to 1965, as well as a court consultant and psychologist, in addition to writing.

Gaddis wrote about another convic in Killer: A Journal of Murder (1970), co-written with James O. Long, about serial killer Carl Panzram.

== Death ==
Gaddis died in Portland, Oregon, on October 10, 1984, at age 76.
