= Resident Advisor =

Online music magazine and community platform

- Company type: Privately held company
- Website type: music website
- Founded: 2001; 25 years ago
- Headquarters: London, England, UK
- Area served: Worldwide
- Founders: Paul Clement; Nick Sabine
- Employees: 100
- Website: ra.co
- Launched: 10 August 2001; 25 years ago

Resident Advisor (also known as RA) is a British online music magazine and community platform established in 2001 and dedicated to showcasing electronic music, artists and events across the globe. Its editorial team provides news, music and event reviews, as well as films, features and interviews. Resident Advisor also provides global event listings and ticket sales platform, club and promoter directories, artist and record label profiles, and the RA Podcast.

The company has its headquarters in London, with additional offices in Berlin, Los Angeles, New York and Melbourne. The website won a People's Voice award in the 12th Annual Webby Awards in 2008.

== History ==
Resident Advisor was founded in Sydney, Australia in 2001 by Paul Clement and Nick Sabine as a website for providing news and information relating to the Australian dance music scene.

As Resident Advisor grew both Clement and Sabine initially kept their day jobs and hired staff to help with the site. In 2006, after Clement and Sabine had moved to the UK, they both began working full time on Resident Advisor and incorporated the company in the UK, with an office in Berlin opening 2007.

RA Tickets was unveiled in 2008 to allow promoters of electronic music to sell tickets. RA Tickets launched a face-value ticket resale system.

In January 2014, the first complete redesign in the site's history was announced, adding mobile support, responsive design, a new logo, full SoundCloud integration on artist pages and other features. At that time, Resident Advisor started to have more than two million users per month.

An article in The New York Times, published in July 2015, mentions Resident Advisor as "one of the most influential EDM-focused sites".

The company launched its first consumer-focused iOS app in 2015. The RA Guide, free in the App Store (iOS), takes the site's listings for clubs, festivals and concerts to the mobile market. Apple featured RA as a curator, with the launch of Apple Music, to contribute electronic music playlists to the streaming service.

In October 2020, following the negative impact of the COVID-19 pandemic on British arts and culture organisations, RA received £750,000 from the Arts Council of England as part of the UK's Culture Recovery Fund initiative.

At the start of 2021, Resident Advisor launched a redesign of their existing website. The new design also coincided with a change to their domain name, migrating from residentadvisor.net to ra.co.

== Other media ==
The RA Podcast is a weekly mix of electronic music from top producers and DJs. It launched on 6 March 2006 with a mix from Troy Pierce. In 2010, Resident Advisor started a second podcast series titled the RA Exchange. The site defines the RA Exchange as a series of conversations with artists (e.g., Guy Gerber, Morgan Geist, and New Order), labels (e.g., Defected Records, Future Classic, and Rush Hour), and promoters (e.g., Decibel, MUTEK, and Sónar) shaping the electronic music landscape.

Resident Advisor launched RA Films in 2011, starting with a documentary series called Real Scenes that covered music culture in Bristol, Berlin and Detroit. Over the following years, RA continued to produce a variety of video-based content including; live performances, interviews, and both short and long-form reporting.

== Annual polls ==
From 2006 to 2016 Resident Advisor conducted two annual voting polls at the end of each year under the name RA Poll. The first polls the publications readers, who are asked to vote for their top 100 DJs and live acts of the year.

Resident Advisor ceased the polls in 2017 due to concerns about diversity and their growing influence on the music industry.

== Album of the Year ==
Year	Artist	Album	Source
2006	Booka Shade	Movements	
2007	Burial	Untrue	
2008	Shed	Shedding the Past	
2009	DJ Sprinkles	Midtown 120 Blues	
2010	Caribou	Swim	
2011	Nicolas Jaar	Space Is Only Noise	
2012	Voices from the Lake	Voices from the Lake	
2013	James Holden	The Inheritors	
2014	Andy Stott	Faith in Strangers	
2015	Floating Points	Elaenia	
2016	Babyfather	"BBF" Hosted by DJ Escrow	
2019	FKA Twigs	Magdalene	
2020	DJ Python	Mas Amable	
2021	Space Afrika	Honest Labour	
2022	D. Tiffany and Roza Terenzi	Edge of Innocence	
2023	Kelela	Raven	
2024	Loidis	One Day	
2025	Blawan	SickElixir	

For 2017 and 2018, Resident Advisor published entirely non-ranked album lists.

Decade	Artist	Album	Source
2000s	Ricardo Villalobos	Alcachofa	

For the 2010s, Resident Advisor published a largely non-ranked album list.
