= Yeager (disambiguation) =

Yeager is a surname.

Yeager may also refer to:

- Yeager, Kentucky, United States, an unincorporated community and coal town
- Yeager, Oklahoma, United States, a town
- Yeager, a 2003 film directed by John Moore
- Yeager Airport, a public airport near Charleston, West Virginia, United States

== See also ==
- Yager (disambiguation)
- Yaeger, a list of people with the surname
- Yaeger Lake, Minnesota, United States
- Jagger (disambiguation)
- Jagr (disambiguation)
- Jäger (disambiguation)
