= Jäger (surname) =

Jäger (also Jager, Jaeger, or Jæger; German pronunciation: [ˈjɛːɡɐ]) is a common German surname. It comes from the German word for "hunter". Related surnames in other languages include De Jager, Jääger, Jágr, Yaeger and Yeager.

The surname may refer to:

== In arts and entertainment ==
=== Acting ===
- Frederick Jaeger (1928–2004), German-born actor
- Professor Jager, stage name of Scott Folsom, co-founder of the League of STEAM performance troupe
- Julia Jäger (born 1970), German actress

=== Fictional characters ===
- Eren Jaeger or Yeager, the main protagonist of the manga series Attack on Titan and its anime adaptation
- Erich Jager, UPEO SARF pilot and player's wingman in Ace Combat 3: Electrosphere
- Felix Jaeger, in the Gotrek and Felix series
- Frank Jaeger, better known as Gray Fox, in the Metal Gear series
- Grisha Yeager or Jaeger, the father of Eren and Zeke from manga series Attack on Titan and anime adaptation
- Gen. Radi Jaeger, a villain in the video game Valkyria Chronicles - see List of Valkyria Chronicles characters
- Zeke Yeager or Jaeger, the older brother of Eren Jaeger of the manga series Attack on Titan and anime adaptation

=== Music ===
- August Jaeger (1860–1909), English music publisher of German extraction, the "Nimrod" of Edward Elgar's composition
- Finne Jager, trance music DJ from the Netherlands
- Marike Jager (born 1979), singer, guitarist and composer from the Netherlands
- Robert E. Jager (born 1939), US composer
- Hanna Gillian Kristina Jäger (born 1998), known professionally as Yaeger (singer), Swedish singer

=== Visual arts ===
- Alex Jaeger, American art director and costume designer
- Gerrit de Jager (born 1954), Dutch comic-artist
- Gustav Jaeger (painter) (1808–1871), German painter
- Michael Jäger (artist) (born 1956), German artist
- Stefan Jäger (1877–1962), painter

=== Journalism and Writing ===
- Frank Jæger (1926–1977), Danish poet
- Hans Jæger (1854–1910), Norwegian writer, philosopher and political activist
- Lorenz Jäger (born 1951), German journalist

== In government and politics ==
- Alvin Jaeger (born 1943), politician
- Friedrich Gustav Jaeger (1895–1944), resistance fighter in Nazi Germany and a member of the 20 July Plot
- Hans Jæger (1854–1910), Norwegian writer, philosopher and political activist
- Jan Kees de Jager (born 1969), IT entrepreneur and politician in the Netherlands
- Karl Jäger (1888–1959), Swiss-born Nazi leader, commander of the SD Einsatzkommando 3
- Kay Jäger (born 1992), German politician
- Richard Jaeger (1913–1998), German politician

== In religion ==
- Jacob de Jager (1923–2004), general authority of The Church of Jesus Christ of Latter-day Saints
- Lorenz Jaeger (1892–1975), German prelate of the Roman Catholic Church
- Maximilian Jaeger (1915–1999), Swiss Minister in Budapest from 1936 to 1944
- Willigis Jäger (1925–2020), German Benedictine friar, mystic, and Zen master

== In science and academia ==
- Edmund Jaeger (1887–1983), US biologist
- Eduard Jäger von Jaxtthal (1818–1884), Austrian ophthalmologist
- Eric Jager (born 1957), professor in the department of English at University of California, Los Angeles
- Frans Maurits Jaeger (1877–1945), Dutch chemist
- Gert Jäger (born 1935), German translation scholar and a specialist in the Polish and Czech languages
- Gustav Jäger (naturalist) (1832–1917), German naturalist and doctor
- Hermann Jaeger (1844–?), Swiss oenologist
- John Conrad Jaeger (1907–1979), Australian mathematical physicist.
- Margarete Jäger (born 1951), German linguist
- Marilyn Jager Adams (born 1948), researcher in the areas of cognition and education
- Peter Jäger, German arachnologist
- Werner Jaeger (1888–1961), German classicist

== In sport ==
- Adolf Jäger (1889–1944), German amateur football (soccer) player
- Andrea Jaeger (born 1965), American tennis player and humanitarian
- Eric Jagers (born 1995), American baseball coach
- Gisela Jäger, German rower
- Henriette Jæger (born 2003), Norwegian athlete
- Jaromír Jágr (born 1972), Czech ice hockey player
- Jeff Jaeger (born 1964), former American football place-kicker
- Jens Jäger (born 1963), German wheelchair curler, 2010 Winter Paralympian
- Jonathan Jäger (born 1978), French-born German professional footballer
- Martin Jágr (born 1979), Czech rugby union player
- Maximilian Jäger (born 2000), German para-cyclist
- Peta Taylor (married name Mary Jaegar, 1912–1989), English cricketer
- Thomas Jäger (born 1976), German racing driver
- Tom Jager (born 1964), US freestyle swimmer
- Werner Jäger (born 1959), Austrian ice speed skater
- Evan Jager (born 1989), 3000m Steeplechase silver medalist in 2016 Rio Olympics

== In other fields ==
- August Jäger (1887–1949), German official of the Nazi era
- Heinz Jaeger (1924–2025), German philatelist
- Nicolai Henrich Jæger (1780–1846), Norwegian lawyer
- Otto Jäger (1894–1917), German Austro-Hungarian soldier

== See also ==
- Jagger (disambiguation)
