= Jager =

Jager is a Dutch occupational surname meaning "hunter". People with this surname include:

- Durk Jager (1943–2022), Dutch businessman in the United States
- Eric Jager (born 1957), American medievalist and literary critic
- Evan Jager (born 1989), American long-distance runner
- Finne Jager (born 1984), Dutch trance music DJ and producer
- Henry Jager (1879–1952), New York assemblyman 1921
- Maja Jager (born 1991), Danish archer
- Marike Jager (born 1979), Dutch singer-songwriter, guitarist and television presenter
- Matt Jager (born 1988), Australian golfer
- Robert E. Jager (born 1939), American composer, music theorist and a conductor
- Sheila Miyoshi Jager (born 1963), American anthropologist
- Tom Jager (born 1964), American freestyle swimmer, five-time Olympic champion

== See also ==
- Jäger (disambiguation), a German surname and military term for rifle-armed infantry
- Jägermeister, a disgestif liquor
- Related surnames: De Jager, Jäger, Jaeger, Jagger, Jágr
- Jager Afrikaner (died 1823), leader of the Oorlam people in South West Africa
- Jager Burton (born 2002), American football player
- Jáger and Jager are Slavic names for Eger, a city in Hungary
- A compilation of terms that sound like or remind of "Jager" are collected in the entry Jäger
