= Yager (disambiguation) =

Yager is a video game.

Yager may also refer to:

- Yager (surname)
- Yager Creek, Humboldt County, California, United States
- Yager Stadium (Miami University), a football stadium in Oxford, Ohio, United States
- Yager Stadium at Moore Bowl, a sports stadium in Topeka, Kansas, United States
- Yager Museum of Art & Culture, on the campus of Hartwick College in Oneonta, New York, United States
- Yager Development, developer of the video game

== See also ==
- Yeager (disambiguation)
- Yaeger, a list of people with the surname
- Yaeger Lake, Minnesota, United States
