= De Jager =

de Jager is an occupational surname of Dutch origin, meaning "the hunter". It may refer to:

de Jager:

- Bartholomeus de Jager (fl. 1650s), Dutch privateer
- Benjamin de Jager (born 1980), South African rugby player in Italy
- Benjamin (Bennie) de Jager (born 1985), South African guitarist for Straatligkinders and Moses Metro Man
- Cor de Jager (1925–2001), Dutch army general and NATO Military Committee chairman
- Danie de Jager (1936–2003), South African sculptor
- Dirk De Jager (born c. 1972), Air Transat pilot
- Fanie de Jager (born 1949), South African singer
- Geoffrey de Jager (born 1950), South African entrepreneur and philanthropist
- Gerrit de Jager (born 1954), Dutch comic-artist
- Gerrit de Jager (born 1986), South African Radio presenter, comedian and singer
- Herbert de Jager (1634–1694), Dutch orientalist
- Jacob de Jager (1923–2004), Dutch Mormon leader
- Jan Kees de Jager (born 1969), Dutch IT entrepreneur and politician
- Jip de Jager (1912–2000), South African Politician and advocate for German education
- John-Laffnie de Jager (born 1973), South African tennis player
- Jost de Jager (born 1965), German politician
- Kees de Jager (1921–2021), Dutch astronomer
- Lood de Jager (born 1992), South African rugby player
- Louis de Jager (born 1987), South African golfer
- Nick de Jager (born 1990), South African rugby player
- Nikkie de Jager (born 1994), birth name of Dutch make-up artist and beauty vlogger NikkieTutorials
- Penney de Jager (born 1948), Dutch dancer and choreographer
- Peter de Jager (born 1955), South African born Canadian, best known as "the Paul Revere for the year-2000 computer crisis." (NYTimes)
- Shaun de Jager (born 1991), South African sprinter
- Stephanus Johannes de Jager (fl. 1984), South African arms smuggler

de Jaeger:

- Charles de Jaeger (1911–2000), Austrian-born cameraman for the BBC
- Maria De Jaeger (1901–2011), Belgian supercentenarian

== See also ==
- de Jagers Pass, South African mountain pass
- De Jager v Sisana, South African law case
- 3798 de Jager, asteroid named after Cornelis/Kees de Jager
- Jäger (surname)
