= Jäger =

Jäger, Jager, or Jaeger (German pronunciation: [ˈjɛːɡɐ]), meaning "hunter" in German, may refer to:

- Jäger (surname), also Jaeger and Jæger, including a list of people and fictional characters with the surname

== Fictional characters ==
- Jaeger, in the television series Altered Carbon
- Jaeger, a group of vampire hunters in the anime series Sirius the Jaeger
- Jaegers, a group in the Akame ga Kill! manga and anime
- Jaegers, piloted robots used to fight alien monsters in the 2013 film Pacific Rim and the 2018 sequel
- Jaeger (alt. Jäger; Yeager), refers to a family from the manga series Attack on Titan and its anime adaptation of the same name
- Marius “Jäger” Streicher, an operator in Tom Clancy's Rainbow Six Siege

== In biology ==
- Jaeger, the North American name for the smaller species of the skua family of seabirds
- Jaeger 70, a hybrid of two American species of grape
- Jaeger's anetia, a species of butterfly in the family Danaidae

== Businesses and products ==
- Jaeger (automobile), an automobile built in Belleville, Michigan by the Jaeger Motor Car Company
- Jaeger (clothing), a United Kingdom clothing retailer, named after Gustav Jäger
  - Jaeger, a union suit (or "woolly combination") popularised by the Jaeger clothing company
- Jaeger (software), a distributed tracing system
- Jaeger, a trademark of Italian automotive manufacturer Magneti Marelli
- Armi Jager, an Italian firearms manufacturer
- Jägermeister, a German digestif

== Military ==
- Jäger (infantry), a German military term for rifle-armed infantry
- Jäger rifle, a type of early flintlock rifle; see German military rifles
- List of Jäger units

== Sport ==
- Hunter Jaegers, an Australian netball team
- Jäger (or Jaeger), a release skill performed on the horizontal bar or uneven bars in gymnastics
- Rote Jäger, a short-lived German military football club active during World War II

== Other uses ==
- Jager, an alternative name for the city of Eger in Hungary

== See also ==
- De Jager
- Jaeger-LeCoultre, a maker of watches
- Yeager
- Jagger (disambiguation)
- Jágr (surname)
