= Boy on a Dolphin =

1957 film by Jean Negulesco

- Theatrical release poster
- Directed by: Jean Negulesco
- Screenplay by: Ivan Moffat; Dwight Taylor
- Based on: Boy on a Dolphin by David Divine
- Produced by: Samuel G. Engel
- Starring: Alan Ladd; Clifton Webb; Sophia Loren; Alexis Minotis; Jorge Mistral; Laurence Naismith; Piero Giagnoni; Gertrude Flynn
- Cinematography: Milton Krasner
- Edited by: William Mace
- Music by: Hugo Friedhofer
- Distributed by: 20th Century-Fox
- Release date: April 19, 1957
- Running time: 111 minutes
- Country: United States
- Language: English
- Budget: $2.8 million or $3.5 million
- Box office: $2.8 million (US and Canadian rentals) $6 million(World-wide Rentals))

Boy on a Dolphin is a 1957 American romantic adventure film theatrically released by 20th Century-Fox. It is set in Greece and shot in DeLuxe Color and CinemaScope. It was directed by Jean Negulesco and produced by Samuel G. Engel from a screenplay by Ivan Moffat and Dwight Taylor, based on the 1955 novel of the same name by David Divine.

The film was Sophia Loren's English-language debut. She starred opposite Alan Ladd and Clifton Webb, with Alexis Minotis and Laurence Naismith in support. Hugo Friedhofer's score was nominated for a Best Music Academy Award in 1958. Cinematography was by Milton Krasner. It was the first Hollywood film shot in Greece.

== Plot ==
Phaedra (Sophia Loren) is a poor Greek sponge diver on the island of Hydra. She works from the boat of her boyfriend, Rhif (Jorge Mistral), an immigrant from Albania. She accidentally finds an ancient Greek statue of a boy riding a dolphin on the bottom of the Aegean Sea. The statue brings pride to the city of Hydra and has been lost for around 2000 years. Her efforts to sell it to the highest bidder lead her to two competing individuals: Dr. James Calder (Alan Ladd), an honest archaeologist who will surrender it to Greek authorities, and Victor Parmalee (Clifton Webb), an aesthete and an unscrupulous dealer in historic artifacts.

Calder and Parmalee each try to win Phaedra's cooperation. She works in concert with Parmalee, while developing feelings for Calder. When she seems to waver, Rhif decides to make the deal with Parmalee work. The film reaches a happy conclusion, with virtue rewarded, the statue celebrated by the people of Hydra, and Phaedra and Calder in each other's arms. Parmalee, a man with no apparent national loyalties or heritage, sets course for Monte Carlo.

== Cast ==
- Alan Ladd as Dr. James Calder
- Clifton Webb as Victor Parmalee (Note: Webb's middle name was Parmelee, his mother's maiden name.)
- Sophia Loren as Phaedra
- Alexis Minotis as Miltiades Nadapoulos, an agent of the Greek government
- Jorge Mistral as Rhif, Phaedra's Albanian boyfriend
- Laurence Naismith as Dr. Hawkins
- Piero Giagnoni as Niko, Phaedra's little brother
- Gertrude Flynn as Miss Dill, Calder's assistant

== Production notes ==
The film was loosely based on David Divine's novel by the same name which was published in 1955, which presents as rivals an English archeologist and an impoverished Greek student.

20th Century-Fox bought the film rights prior to publication. Sam Engel was assigned to produce and Alec Coppel to write.

Clifton Webb and Joan Collins were announced as stars. Then Leon Uris was signed to work on the script and Henry Koster to direct. Dwight Taylor wrote a version of the script.

Koster was delayed on D-Day the Sixth of June and was replaced by Jean Negulesco.

The female lead eventually went to Sophia Loren. Alan Ladd signed on shortly before shooting commenced.

=== Shooting ===
Much of the film was shot on location on the Greek Saronic Islands, notably Hydra. Establishing shots of Athens, Rhodes and Delos add to the vérité, while matte shots and some interiors were done at Cinecittà in Rome. One scene uses the Eastern Orthodox monastery complex at Metéora, which was later used as a location in the James Bond film For Your Eyes Only.

Webb fell ill with pneumonia during the shoot. Filming went relatively smoothly, despite the fact it was the first Hollywood movie shot in Greece. Webb later sponsored two Greek children.

The dissimilarity in heights between the 5 ft 8 in (1.73 m) Loren and 5 ft 6 in (1.68 m) Ladd led to complications in filming. Some of their scenes together required him to stand on a box, while another forced a trench to be dug for Loren when the pair walked along the beach.

Paul Stader and Ray Austin were the stunt diving doubles.

== Songs ==
Sophia Loren sings "What is this thing they call love" (Τι 'ναι αυτό που το λένε αγάπη) with an uncredited Tonis Maroudas. The theme song sung by Julie London is heard over the underwater title sequence:

There's a tale that they tell of a dolphin
And a boy made of gold.
With the shells and the pearls in the deep,
He has lain many years fast asleep
What they tell of the boy on a dolphin,
Who can say if it's true?
Should he rise from the depths of the ocean,
Any wish that you wish may come true.

You say "he's only a statue, and what can a statue achieve?"
And yet, while I'm gazing at you,
My heart tells my head to believe.

If the boy whom the gods have enchanted
Should arise from the sea,
And the wish of my heart could be granted,
I would wish that you loved only me.

== Release ==
The film's world premiere on 10 April 1957 in New York was a benefit for Queen Frederika's Fund for Greek Orphans.
