= Alexis Minotis =

Greek actor and director (1900–1990)

- Αλέξης Μινωτής
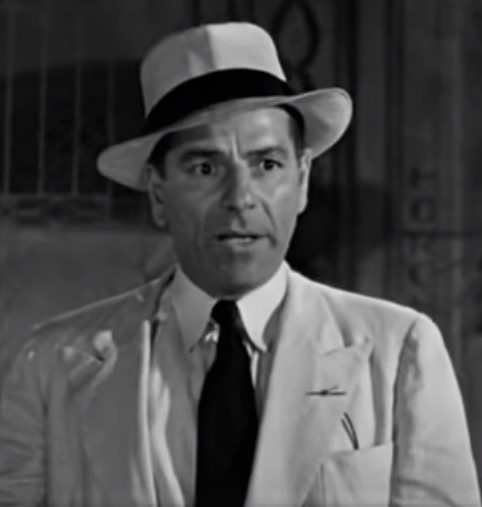
- Minotis in The Chase (1946)
- Born: Alexandros Minotakis; 8 August 1900; Deliana, Cretan State
- Died: 11 November 1990 (aged 90); Red Cross Hospital, Athens, Greece
- Resting place: First Cemetery of Athens
- Citizenship: Cretan State (until 1913); Greece (from 1913)
- Occupations: Actor; director; theatre manager; writer
- Years active: 1918–1989
- Employers: Bank of Athens (1918–1919); National Theatre of Greece (1932–1989)
- Known for: Artistic Director of National Theatre of Greece
- Notable work: Notorious (1946); The Chase (1946); Siren of Atlantis (1949); Panic in the Streets (1950); Land of the Pharaohs (1955); Boy on a Dolphin (1957)
- Spouse: Katina Paxinou (m. 1940; died 1973)

Alexis Minotis (Greek: Αλέξης Μινωτής; born Alexandros Minotakis, Greek: Αλέξανδρος Μινωτάκης; 8 August 1900 – 11 November 1990) was a Greek actor, director, and theatre manager. Widely considered one of Greece's greatest actors, he is celebrated for his reputation as one of the greatest Shakespearean performers. He has also written several books about theatre.

== Life and career ==
Alexandros Minotakis was born on 8 August 1900, in Deliana, Chania. He first appeared on stage in his native Crete as Chorus Leader and later as Messenger in Sophocles' Oedipus Tyrannus. From 1925 until 1930, he worked in close collaboration with the famous Greek actress Marika Kotopouli in her own theatre. During this period, he appeared in the great Shakespearan roles in The Merchant of Venice, King Lear, Macbeth and played the title role in Hamlet, the first time the play had been staged in Greece. Other roles in the classical repertoire were Henrik Ibsen's Ghosts and Peer Gynt. He expanded his talents by directing ancient Greek tragedies such as Hecuba, Antigone, The Phoenissae, Prometheus Bound, Oedipus at Colonus, as well as Seán O'Casey's Juno and the Paycock, August Strindberg's The Father and Brecht's Mother Courage.

In 1940, he married the actress Katina Paxinou, and together they appeared in many productions at the National Theatre of Greece in Athens, which was founded in 1930 by Minister of Education Georgios Papandreou.

In 1946, he went to Hollywood to appear in Alfred Hitchcock's Notorious with Cary Grant, Ingrid Bergman and Claude Rains. In the same year, he also appeared with Robert Cummings and Michèle Morgan in The Chase. His other films include Siren of Atlantis (1949) with Maria Montez, Boy on a Dolphin (1957) with Sophia Loren, and Land of the Pharaohs (1955) with Joan Collins.

In 1955, he directed Katina Paxinou in Euripides' Hecuba for the National Theatre of Greece at The Ancient Theatre of Epidaurus and starred in Oedipus Rex as well as directing. In 1956, he made his first appearance in Oedipus at Colonus. The production received great acclaim, and Minotis went on a long international tour with the company.

He appeared on Broadway in Electra with the Marika Kotopouli company in 1930-31 and in Oedipus Tyrannus with the National Theatre of Greece in 1952.

In 1958, Minotis directed Maria Callas in a production of Medea presented in Dallas. The production was then seen at Covent Garden, Teatro alla Scala and Epidaurus. He also directed the Greek National Opera production of Norma with Callas in Epidaurus in 1960.

== Death and funeral ==
Minotis suffered a stroke on 10 November 1990 and he was taken to Red Cross Hospital, Athens. He died at 11:15 a.m. on 11 November 1990, at age 90, with his close friend and actress, Vana Blazoudaki, his niece, Aleka Makrygiorgi, and actors from the National Theatre by his side.

His body was placed in public pilgrimage on 13 November 1990 for two days, in the parapet of the Little Metropolis, and was released at public expense on 15 November 1990 from the Metropolitan Cathedral of Athens, to the First Cemetery of Athens.

== Filmography ==
Year	Title	Role	Notes
1930	Gia tin agapi tis		
1946	Notorious	Joseph, Sebastian's butler	
1946	The Chase	Lt. Acosta	
1949	Siren of Atlantis	Cortot	
1950	Panic in the Streets	John Mefaris - Restaurant Owner	Uncredited
1955	Land of the Pharaohs	Hamar, the High Priest	
1957	Boy on a Dolphin	Milidias Nadapoulos	
