= Yeger =

Yeger may refer to:

- Armenian name of Lazica, a Caucasian former kingdom, now in Abchasia, Georgia
- Russian Carabiniers, from the German Jäger ("hunters", circa rangers)
- The Russian Red Army version of the Finnish-licensed military camouflage pattern type M05

== See also ==
- Yeager, a surname
