= Hubert Raymond Allen =

Royal Air Force officer

- Born: 19 March 1919
- Died: 31 May 1987 (aged 68)
- Military career
- Allegiance: United Kingdom
- Branch: Royal Air Force
- Service years: 1939–1965
- Rank: Wing Commander
- Nickname: "Dizzy"
- Commands: No. 43 Squadron RAF (1949–52); No. 1 Squadron RAF (1946); No. 66 Squadron RAF (1941)
- Conflicts: Second World War: Battle of Britain
- Awards: Distinguished Flying Cross; Officer of the Order of Orange-Nassau (Netherlands)

Hubert Raymond Allen, DFC (19 March 1919 – 31 May 1987) was a British Royal Air Force (RAF) officer and commentator on defence matters. He fought during the Battle of Britain and was a flying ace of the Second World War, scoring 8 victories. Following his retirement from the RAF as a wing commander in 1965, Allen wrote several controversial books and articles on air power. He criticised RAF Air Staff policies before and during the Second World War. In contrast to the conventional narrative account, he maintained that during the Battle of Britain naval rather than air power was the crucial factor. His opinions clashed with mainstream opinion of the RAF's role, and with the views of many air historians, but his viewpoint received some support and significant attention.

== Career ==
=== Second World War ===
Allen was commissioned into the Royal Air Force in 1939, the outbreak of war curtailing life as an undergraduate at Cardiff University where he was reading Economics. After training, he joined No. 66 Squadron RAF in mid-April 1940. Originally part of Fighter Command's No. 12 Group covering the Midlands and East Anglia, No. 66 Squadron took part in the air battles over the Dunkirk evacuation. During the Battle of Britain, the squadron joined No. 11 Group at Kenley for a week and later served at Gravesend, West Malling and Biggin Hill. Allen had seven confirmed kills and was awarded the Distinguished Flying Cross.

His nickname, "Dizzy", reflected his ability to escape a tight situation by executing an aerobatic flat spin. He was shot down and wounded on a number of occasions, once by the well-known Luftwaffe ace Werner Molders and again as a result of an air-to-air collision with another RAF pilot. In 1978, Allen recorded his experiences as a combat pilot for a BBC programme in which he expressed high praise for his fellow pilots and ground staff but was critical of the radar controllers and the higher echelons of the RAF. His attitude towards those pilots who refused combat was harshly uncompromising, though such feelings were not uncommon at this time. After the Battle of Britain, he became No. 66 Squadron's commander at age 21, succeeding Athol Forbes, with whom he later collaborated in writing, Ten Fighter Boys: 66 Squadron RAF, a collection of first hand accounts of participants originally published in the middle of the war (1942). Allen described his time with No. 66 Squadron in Fighter Squadron 1940–1942.

Later in the war he became Air Advisor to the 1st Airborne Division and then Tactics and Gunnery Officer to No. 12 Group.

=== Post-war service ===
Post-war, he commanded a squadron of Gloster Meteor jet fighters. He was Air Defence Advisor to the Dutch Government for three years, and was awarded the Order of Orange-Nassau. Allen was a skilled pilot having moved from piston engine propeller-driven fighters to the newer generation of jets including the English Electric Lightning, which had a speed exceeding 1,000 mph.

He planned the RAF's coronation flypast over the Queen's balcony at Buckingham Palace in 1953. During the later Queen's Coronation Review, he arranged for 168 aircraft of varying types to fly over the Queen at RAF Odiham in a series of coordinated formations despite appalling weather conditions. As wing commander, he was Personal Staff Officer to the Chief of Staff, Allied Air Forces Central Europe and after his retirement a member of the Corps of Queen's Messengers, a Foreign and Commonwealth Office courier service for the delivery of important diplomatic documents around the world.

He retired in January 1965, later stating that his reason for leaving the RAF prematurely was concern over an RAF plan in the mid-1960s "to snatch the Fleet Air Arm from the Navy. I knew from my study of military strategy that the demise of the Fleet Air Arm would render ineffective the Navy's role in preserving the sea communications on which Britain utterly depends."

== Writer ==
Allen's The Legacy of Lord Trenchard questioned the need for an independent RAF and the rectitude of Air Staff policies before and during the Second World War. The provocatively titled Who Won the Battle of Britain (first published in 1974) followed shortly afterwards with a critique of RAF structure, leadership and doctrine before and during the air campaigns of 1940. Controversially, Allen stated that RAF Fighter Command's 11 Group was a defeated force at the time the invasion was most likely to have been launched. Allen argued that the Luftwaffe did not lose the Battle of Britain air campaigns – reasoning that the Luftwaffe's damaging attacks on airfields containing vital sector stations gave them air superiority during the critical period of late August to early September preceding the change of focus to the bombing of London after which it dropped thousands of tons of bombs with negligible losses. But the Luftwaffe did not win it either as it lacked the training and equipment and therefore the potential to sink enough of the Royal Navy's warships, especially the large capital ships.

Allen maintained that it was the deterrent effect of the Royal Navy fleet in being that was the decisive factor in Adolf Hitler's decision not to launch Operation Sea Lion, the planned invasion of Great Britain. The air battles were important but not fundamental. Having been made aware of the naval problems by the German Naval Staff, Adolf Hitler took Luftwaffe chief Hermann Göring's advice and switched to a Douhet night bombing campaign against civilian centres to try and force the United Kingdom into a negotiated peace. He concluded that "the Battle of Britain has been glorified to the point of hyperbole by British historians".

=== Primacy of sea power, 1940 ===
Allen's case for the primacy of sea power in 1940 is not unique. Derek Robinson and Geoff Hewitt have argued similarly, seeing the Royal Navy as the main invasion deterrent in 1940. However, neither criticised the RAF's leadership and strategy as emphatically as Allen. Some air historians have argued that Fighter Command's 11 Group was "perilously close to collapse" owing to the loss of experienced pilots and damage to command and control infrastructure during the critical period. 11 Group's continuing effectiveness was particularly important because the beaches upon which the Germans planned to land were within their operational area.

Anthony Cumming judged that the immense superiority of the Royal Navy in home waters together with the anti-maritime limitations of the Luftwaffe were the main reasons for the Third Reich effectively abandoning Operation Sea Lion in 1940. In 1958, Duncan Grinnell-Milne submitted his case on behalf of the Royal Navy and in 1960 was further supported by Captain Stephen Roskill, the British Official Naval Historian for the Second World War. Integrating elements of air and sea aspects, Telford Taylor put forward a thorough study of the question a few years later. In more recent years Cumming's The Royal Navy and the Battle of Britain has supported the primacy of seapower argument and James Holland's The Battle of Britain has included a detailed account of the struggle at sea along with accounts of air combat. Both show that sailors, soldiers and airmen were actively engaged in fighting the Germans during the Battle of Britain if the battle is defined to include events prior to the main air fighting such as the Norway campaign and the Dunkirk evacuation – Operation Dynamo. Even with a Luftwaffe victory in the air, neither Holland nor Cumming believes it likely that Operation Sea Lion would have succeeded if launched.

The press heavily criticised three historians from the Joint Services Staff Command College, who were portrayed in a History magazine and the national press as supporting the idea that the Royal Navy won the Battle of Britain. In Britain, at least, questions surrounding the role of the RAF in the Battle of Britain remain sensitive. These historians later argued that this media coverage of their opinions was a 'silly season story par excellence', pointing out that the idea that a small number of young pilots had alone prevented a German invasion is something that historians have long disputed. What Battle of Britain accounts have lacked, they argued, is a more holistic approach that sees the campaign as one in which all three services had played a crucial role. Allen's Who Won the Battle of Britain and his articles were a step in this direction. Both The Legacy of Lord Trenchard and Who Won the Battle of Britain show signs of having been influenced by the former war correspondent and Sunday Times Defence Correspondent David Divine, another fierce critic of the air establishment. However, even Divine did not question the RAF's role and performance in the Battle of Britain as Allen did.

=== Criticism ===
Francis Mason criticised Allen's Who Won the Battle of Britain for displaying 'a bland ignorance of aircraft design' regarding the problems of fitting heavy calibre 0.5' machine guns to a Spitfire and 'ignoring the atmosphere of national parsimony in which successive air ministers and air staff members fought to provide any air defence at all.' Mason implied that Allen's criticism of the recently deceased Fighter Command chief, Air Marshal Sir Hugh Dowding, who could no longer defend himself, was distasteful. Allen did indeed criticise Dowding's conduct of the battle, particularly for allowing the brunt of the fighting to fall upon the embattled 11 Group, but had also argued that Dowding's earlier achievements had been ignored in the failure to make him a Marshal of the Royal Air Force upon retirement. Dowding was sympathetically portrayed in the 1969 blockbuster feature film, Battle of Britain, and died in 1970. He was widely regarded as a national hero, and was officially acknowledged by the erection of his statue at the RAF Chapel, St Clement Dane a few years later. Public criticism of Dowding was controversial during the 1970s, although Laddie Lucas and Douglas Bader also considered Dowding to have deployed a 'parochial' defence that prevented the full resources of Fighter Command being used.

Alfred Price, a historian known for attacking Battle of Britain myths, criticised Allen's Times assertion that the Luftwaffe could have knocked Britain out of the war had it concentrated the night blitz against British ports. To achieve this, Price argued, 'the Luftwaffe would have had to mount a series of heavy and accurate attacks, repeated at regular intervals over a period of several months ... the force lacked both the strength and equipment to achieve this'.

Margaret Salmond, widow of a senior air force officer also wrote a 'vehement protest' to Allen's phrase 'The Battle of Britain that never was' emphasising that 'we should never forget how much we owe to those brave young pilots ...' reflecting a widely held perception that only a handful of RAF pilots had prevented the invasion. In fact it was never his intention to deprecate former comrades whom he had already praised but it was still difficult to attack popular perceptions of the RAF's role without seeming to attack 'the few'.

Allen's views were given prominent coverage in the Times during the 44th and 48th Battle of Britain anniversaries. Publicising these opinions in such a prominent way did not endear Allen to former RAF colleagues or to the general public.
