= Jääger =

Jääger is an Estonian surname meaning "game warden", derived from the German Jäger, meaning "hunter". People bearing the surname include:

- Enar Jääger (born 1984), Estonian footballer
- Enver Jääger (born 1982), Estonian footballer
- Merle Jääger (born 1965), Estonian poet and actress
