= Land of the Pharaohs =

1955 film by Howard Hawks

- Theatrical release poster
- Directed by: Howard Hawks
- Written by: Harold Jack Bloom; William Faulkner; Harry Kurnitz
- Produced by: Howard Hawks
- Starring: Jack Hawkins; Joan Collins; Dewey Martin; Alex Minotis
- Cinematography: Lee Garmes; Russell Harlan
- Edited by: Vladimir Sagovsky
- Music by: Dimitri Tiomkin
- Production companies: Warner Bros. Pictures; Continental Company
- Distributed by: Warner Bros. Pictures
- Release dates: June 22, 1955 (Los Angeles); July 2, 1955 (U.S.); May 3, 1956 (UK)
- Running time: 106 minutes (U.S.); 103 minutes (UK)
- Country: United States
- Language: English
- Budget: $2.9 million (estimated)
- Box office: $2.7 million (U.S.)

Land of the Pharaohs is a 1955 American epic historical drama film in CinemaScope and WarnerColor from Warner Bros. Pictures, produced and directed by Howard Hawks. The cast was headed by Jack Hawkins as Pharaoh Khufu and Joan Collins as one of his wives, Nellifer. The film is a fictional account of the building of the Great Pyramid. Nobel Prize-winning novelist William Faulkner was one of the film's three credited screenwriters.

Land of the Pharaohs had a cast of thousands – Warners' press office claimed there were 9,787 extras in one scene – and was one of Hollywood's largest-scale, ancient world epics, made in the same spirit as The Robe, The Ten Commandments and Ben-Hur.

== Plot ==
Pharaoh Khufu, an all-powerful ruler of ancient Egypt, amasses a great treasure by conquering other lands. He wants to be entombed with it when he dies (so he can enjoy it in the "second life"), free from the threat of grave robbers. Dissatisfied with the unoriginal security features of his architects' plans for his tomb, he offers Vashtar, a brilliant, newly enslaved architect, a bargain: freedom for his conquered people if he can design a robber-proof pyramid; however, he will be killed once it is completed, so its secrets will die with him. Vashtar agrees. After much thought, he comes up with an ingenious design that seals the labyrinth to the burial chamber after burial via a clever system of jars filled with sand, which, when broken, will release giant blocks of stone to slide into place and close the labyrinth.

As the years pass, Pharaoh's subjects, who once joyfully viewed the pyramid's construction as holy work, become disillusioned by decades of misery and drudgery. Yet Pharaoh presses on, levying high taxes on tributary states to continue financing his tomb. The province of Cyprus, however, offers him the beautiful Princess Nellifer instead of taxes. When he demands the taxes, Nellifer defiantly tells him he can have her or the taxes, but not both. He has her whipped for her insolence, but she eventually becomes his second wife. She plots and schemes to become his heir; her attempted assassination of Pharaoh's young son instead claims the life of the boy's mother, Queen Nailla, when she shields her son from a deadly cobra with her own body.

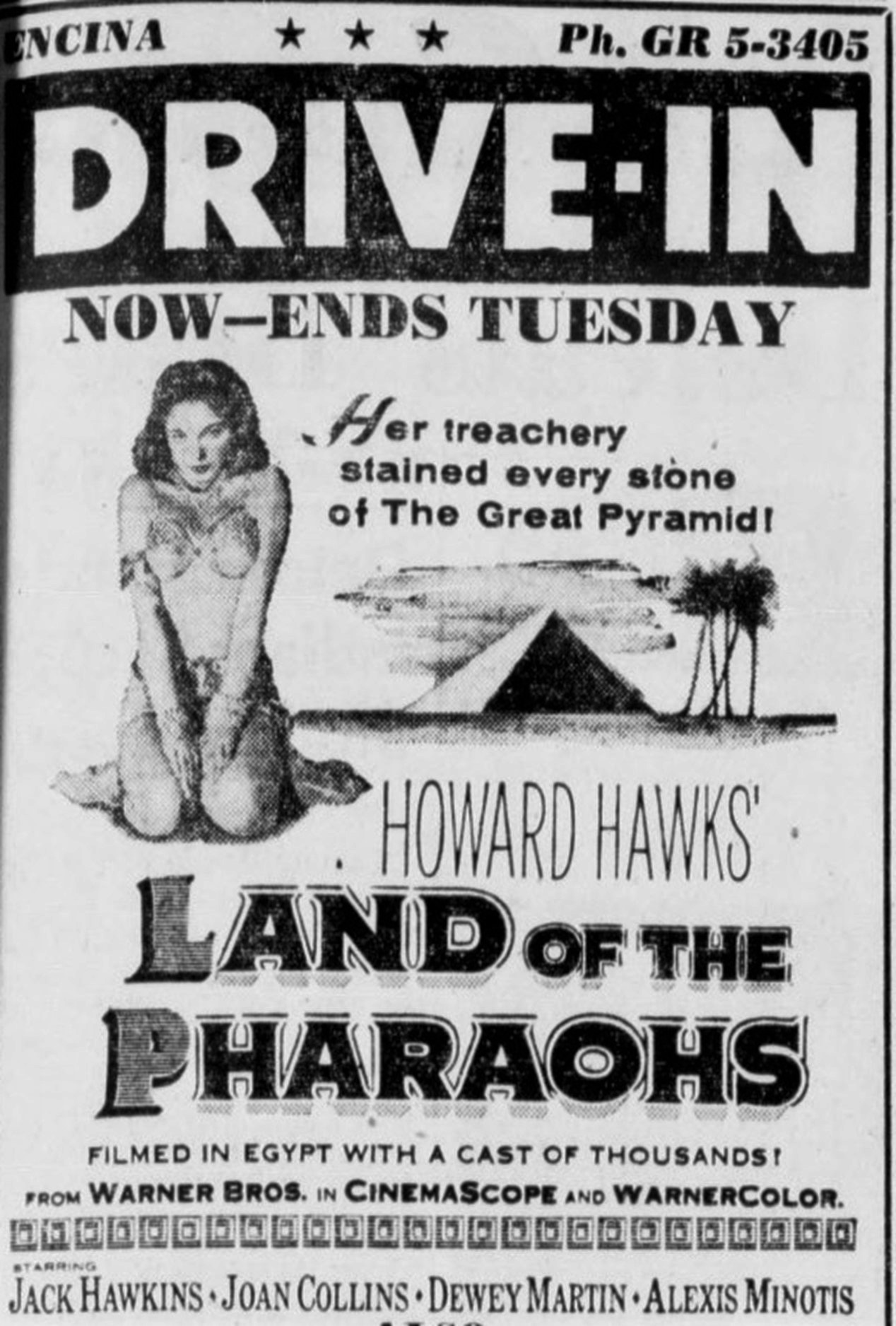
Drive-in advertisement from 1955.

In the meantime, Vashtar's aging eyes begin to fail, and he is forced to secretly rely on his son Senta to help supervise the construction, teaching him its secrets. One day, Senta saves Pharaoh from a runaway stone block on the construction site. Pharaoh is injured and will die without medical attention. Senta leads him out of the pyramid, dooming himself to the same fate as his father for his forbidden knowledge. Promised any reward in Pharaoh's power to bestow, Senta chooses Nellifer's slave, Kyra, to save her from Nellifer's wrath. When Nellifer protests, Pharaoh publicly rebukes her before the court. Humiliated, Nellifer conspires to have the pharaoh meet an early end. That night, Pharaoh is seriously wounded but kills his would-be assassin, Nellifer's slave Nabuna. Suspecting Nellifer to be behind the scheme, he hurries back to the city and eavesdrops on Nellifer and Treneh, the captain of the guards watching over his treasure, whom Nellifer has seduced. Nellifer, however, spots blood on the floor and manipulates Pharaoh into a sword fight with Treneh. Though Pharaoh slays Treneh, he is wounded again and collapses. Realizing he is dying, he orders Nellifer to send for Hamar, his loyal high priest and lifelong friend. She, however, reveals her treachery and watches him die.

Hamar releases Vashtar's people as promised and even allows Vashtar and Senta to join them, since the design need not be kept secret as it would be impossible to break into the tomb. Pharaoh's treasure is moved into the tomb so the deceased can enjoy it in the "second life." Hamar then tells Nellifer that she, as queen, must preside over the ceremony in the central burial chamber before she can rule. Once she gives the order to seal the sarcophagus, a hidden lever releases jars of sand, causing massive stone blocks to descend and seal all the labyrinth passages. "There's no way out!" Hamar tells her. "This is what you lied and schemed and murdered to achieve. This is your kingdom!" Nellifer vainly screams for mercy as she, Hamar, and the priests who accompanied them are interred in the tomb.

Vashtar, Senta, and their people, on their way back to their homeland, briefly pause to look back at the pyramid.

== Cast ==
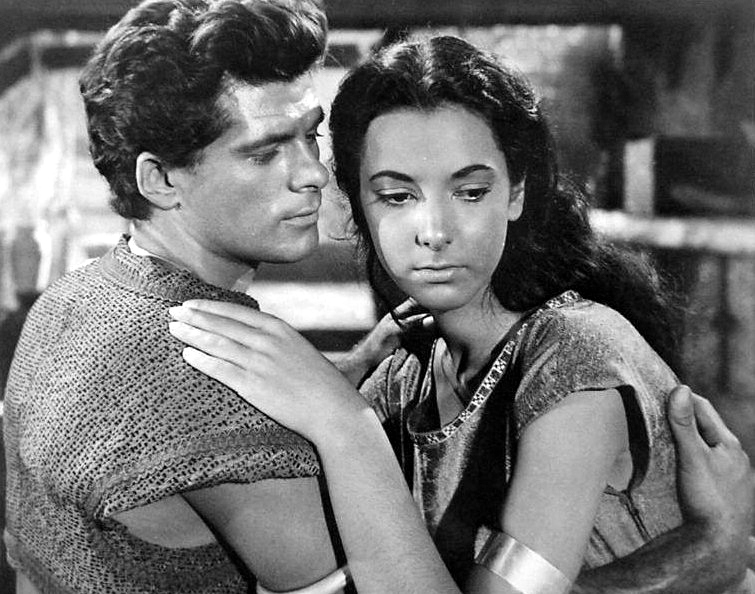
Dewey Martin and Luisella Boni

- Jack Hawkins as Pharaoh Khufu
- Joan Collins as Princess Nellifer
- Dewey Martin as Senta
- Alexis Minotis as Hamar (dubbed by Robert Rietty)
- James Robertson Justice as Vashtar
- Luisella Boni as Kyra (as Luisa Boni)
- Sydney Chaplin as Treneh
- James Hayter as Mikka
- Kerima as Queen Nailla
- Piero Giagnoni as Prince Xenon
- Ferruccio Amendola as Egyptian architect (uncredited)
- Gianfranco Bellini as Captain of the guard (uncredited)
- Valérie Camille as Dancer at the party (uncredited)
- Carlo D'Angelo as Nabuna (uncredited)
- Cyril Delevanti (uncredited)
- Vittoria Febbi as Mea (uncredited)

== Production ==
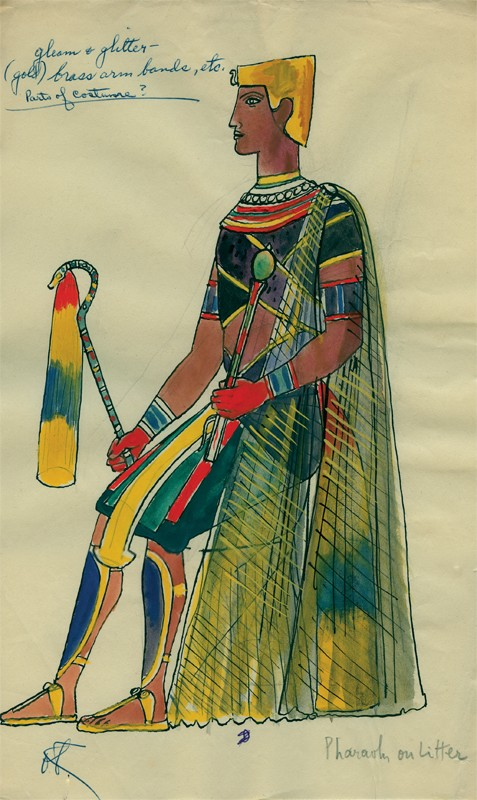
Pharaoh costume by Mayo, with Hawks' notations

Hawks had between 3,000 and 10,000 extras working each day during the fifty-plus day shooting schedule. The government supplied those extras, half of whom were soldiers in the Egyptian Army.

The film was shot on location in Egypt and in Rome's Titanus studios. For scenes showing the pyramid under construction, the film crew cleared the sand away from a 90 ft (27 m) deep shaft that was part of the unfinished pyramid of Baka. Elsewhere, they built a ramp and foundation the size of the original pyramid, where thousands of extras were filmed pulling huge stone blocks. Other scenes were shot at a limestone quarry at Tourah, near Cairo, and at Aswan, a granite quarry located 500 miles (800 km) away. At these sites, 9,787 actors were filmed in a single scene.

The costume designs are the work of French painter and costume designer Mayo, who worked on Les Enfants du paradis (1945) and La Beauté du diable (1950).

== Reception ==
Lacking a big-name cast, Land of the Pharaohs was unsuccessful at the box office, earning $450,000 short of its $3,150,000 production budget.

A. H. Weiler of The New York Times wrote that "while it is impressively sweeping in its eye-filling pageantry, this saga of the building of a colossal pyramid 5,000 years ago is staged on the creaky foundation of a tale of palace intrigue that must have been banal even in the First Dynasty." Variety wrote, "While shy of proven draw value in cast names, the Howard Hawks production for Warners makes up for the lack of romance, adventure and intrigue played against a grandioso backdrop of actual story locales populated with teeming masses of thousands upon thousands of extras." Edwin Schallert of the Los Angeles Times wrote: "Hawks has invested his subject with enthralling spectacle from the first victorious march home of the Pharaoh with his captives. The actual story can hardly be designated as having an equally grand concept, and is made exceptional mainly by technical devices." Richard L. Coe of The Washington Post wrote that the technical aspects of the film "will provide moments of complete fascination," but thought that screenwriter "Faulkner, abetted by Harry Kurnitz and Harold Jack Bloom, has laid a Hollywooden egg." Harrison's Reports wrote that the film "grips one's attention throughout," due to the "overwhelming grandeur and vast production values" and "fascinating story." The Monthly Film Bulletin wrote: "The attraction of such epics as Land of the Pharaohs lies almost entirely in their incidental detail, since whatever the period in time, the situation is predictable and the players are doomed to remain within the limitations of Hollywood's historical imagination. It says much for Jack Hawkins' Pharaoh (a performance of integrity and surprising vigour) that it surmounts the occasional absurdities of dress and unlikely figures of speech, even if we remain unconvinced that he is a living god."

The film was banned in Egypt on the grounds of "distortion of historical facts."

Land of the Pharaohs was Howard Hawks's first commercial failure; it caused him to take a break from directing and to travel through Europe for several years. Hawks made his next film, Rio Bravo (1959), four years later; this was the longest break between two feature films in his career.

== Cult status ==
The film has drawn more interest over the years and has been defended by Martin Scorsese, French critics supporting the auteur theory, and for numerous elements of its physical production. Danny Peary in his book Cult Movies (1981), selected it as a cult classic. On Rotten Tomatoes the film holds a 78% rating based on 9 reviews.

In The New York Times, Dave Kehr wrote that "Howard Hawks’s Land of the Pharaohs could be the most down-to-earth costume epic ever made...in typical Hawks fashion, Topic A is the business of getting a dangerous job done: in this case the construction, under the Pharaoh Khufu (Jack Hawkins), of the Great Pyramid of Giza...The art direction, by the incomparable Alexandre Trauner (Children of Paradise), alludes to the Fascist architecture so recently and disastrously popular in Europe, and Hawks makes the dictatorial Khufu an ambiguous figure: admirable for his ambition and energy, dangerous in his contempt for human life and fierce commitment to a cruel religion. Hawks’s films always seem conspicuously secular in the context of the religiosity of much Hollywood cinema; Land of the Pharaohs is quietly, confidently skeptical of all things transcendent."

In 2023, critic Jonathan Rosenbaum hailed it as a masterpiece, praising it "for its contemporary relevance 68 years later" in relation to the figureheads that now defined American conservative politics.

In a 1978 Film Comment article Martin Scorsese listed the film as among his favorites:

I'd always been addicted to historical epics, but this one was different: it gave the sense that we were really there. This is the way people lived; this is what they believed, thought, and felt. You get it through the overall look of the picture: the low ceilings, the torchlit interiors, the shape of the pillars, the look of the extras. There's a marvelous moment when the dead are being taken away from battle in their coffins, and someone says, "Let us hear the gods of Egypt speak." The camera pans over to one of the statues of the gods, and it talks. That's it-the statue talks! You don't see the mouth moving, you just hear the voice. Then they pan over to the other god-and now he talks. Soon there are about four gods talking. You're never told, "This is how they did it: it was a joke, a trick." In a sense, you're taken into confidence by the Egyptians; you're let in on a religion. I watch this movie over and over again.

== See also ==
- List of American films of 1955
- List of epic films
- List of historical drama films
- Ancient Egyptian funerary practices
