= Gertrude Flynn =

American actress

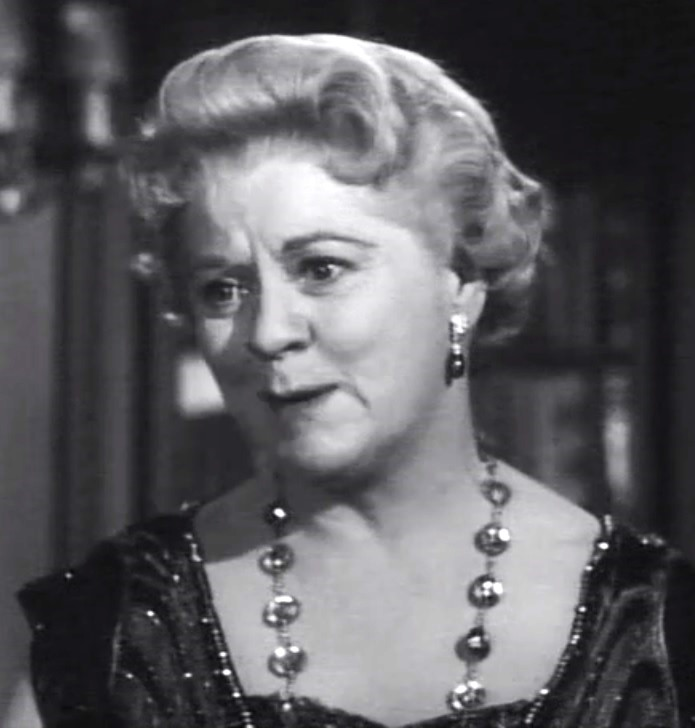
- Flynn in The Lawless Years (1959)
- Born: January 14, 1909; New York City, U.S.
- Died: October 16, 1996 (aged 87); Columbia, South Carolina, U.S.
- Occupation: Actress
- Years active: 1929–1987
- Spouse: Asa Bordages

Gertrude Flynn (January 14, 1909 – October 16, 1996) was an American stage, film and television actress. She was married to Asa Bordages, a feature writer for the New York World-Telegram and playwright known for the 1941 play Brooklyn USA.

== Career ==
Flynn's film and television career began in 1954 in The Barefoot Contessa as "Lulu McGee". She played "Maggie Blake" in the Sherlock Holmes episode, "The Case of the Belligerent Ghost".

She made five guest appearances on Perry Mason in the early 1960s, including as "Agatha Culpepper" in "The Case of the Floating Stones", as Mrs. Nichols in "The Case of the Irate Inventor" in 1960, as Sylvia Lambert in the 1963 episode "The Case of the Bluffing Blast", and last as Rosalind - Mrs. Hendrick in the 1966 episode "The Case of the Golfer's Gambit".

Her final appearance was in 1966 in the "Case of the Golfer's Gambit" as Rolasie Hedrick. During the 1965–66 season of the soap opera Days of Our Lives she made five appearances as Anna Sawyer. She made her final television appearances in 1987 in Outlaws.

=== Theater ===
Flynn performed on Broadway beginning in the late 1920s. She appeared on stage through 1952 in the following productions, the most successful of which ran for three months:

- The Unsophisticates (December 30, 1929-January 1930) as Phyllis
- Penal Law 2010 (April 18, 1930-May 1930) as Lucy Van Dam
- Gasoline Gypsies (June 1931-June 1931) as Ruth Warren
- Three Times the Hour (August 25, 1931-September 1931) as Hildah Lovering
- The Moon in the Yellow River (February 29, 1932-April 1932) as Blanaid
- American Dream (February 21, 1933-March 1933) as Celia, Amarylils
- Man Bites Dog (April 25, 1933-May 1933) as Helen Lee
- Biography (February 1934-February 1934) as Slade Kinnicott
- Jigsaw (April 30, 1934-June 1934) as Julie
- A Sleeping Clergyman (October 8, 1934 - November 1934) as Cousin Minnie
- Mother Lode (December 1934-December 1934) as Julia Musette
- Noah (February 13, 1935-March 1935) as Ada
- One Good Year (November 27, 1935 - June 1936) as Anne
- The Puritan (January 1936-January 1936) as Kitty
- Marching Song (February 17, 1937-April 1937) as Rose Graham
- Romantic Mr. Dickens (December 2, 1940 – December 7, 1940) as Dora Spenlow (Later Dora Winter)
- The Distant City (September 22, 1941 – September 23, 1941) as Edna Scott
- The Grass Harp (March 27, 1952 – April 26, 1952) as The Baker's Wife

Despite the brief length of the stage productions, Flynn garnered some good reviews. The New York Times noted her appearance in the very short-lived (5 days) 1940 production of Romantic Mr. Dickens, a drama about the romances of Charles Dickens, and wrote that she "fit smoothly into this rather unorthodox picture of a literary tradition." After beginning her work in film and television, Flynn continued work in theater, making appearances in such as Summer Voices at the Circle Theater in Los Angeles as late as 1977.

Of her 1965 performance in the West Coast Repertory Company's troubled production of Long Day's Journey Into Night, the Los Angeles Times wrote "The one saving grace of the evening was the fine performance by Gertrude Flynn of Mary Tyrone".

=== Film and television ===
Flynn appeared in I Want To Live, Invitation to a Gunfighter and Rome Adventure. She guest starred on such television series as The Millionaire, Alfred Hitchcock Presents, The Alfred Hitchcock Hour, The Loretta Young Show, Maverick, Have Gun - Will Travel, Dr Kildare, Perry Mason, Gunsmoke, Hawaii Five-O, Charlie's Angels, The Love Boat, and Hill Street Blues. Flynn appeared in the classic 1961 Twilight Zone episode, "Will the Real Martian Please Stand Up?". She played as Rose Kramer.

== Partial filmography ==
=== Film ===
- The Barefoot Contessa (1954) as Lulu McGee
- War and Peace (1956) as Mariya Peronskaya
- Difendo il mio amore (1956)
- Boy on a Dolphin (1957) as Miss Dill
- The Love Specialist (1957)
- I Want to Live! (1958) as San Quentin Matron
- A Summer Place (1959) as Mrs. Carter, Helen's Mother (uncredited)
- Parrish (1961) as Miss Daly (uncredited)
- Rome Adventure (1962) as Mrs. Riggs
- The Thrill of It All (1963) as Celine (uncredited)
- Invitation to a Gunfighter (1964) as Hannah Guthrie
- Inside Daisy Clover (1965) as Daisy's Nurse (uncredited)
- Valley of the Dolls (1967) as Ladies' Room Attendant (uncredited)
- Blackbeard's Ghost (1968) as Mrs. Starkey (uncredited)
- Funny Girl (1968) as Mrs. O'Malley
- Devil Dog:The Hound of Hell (1978) as Occultist
- Bad Manners (1984) as Mother Celestina

=== Television ===
- Sherlock Holmes (1 episode, 1954) as Maggie Blake
- Conrad Nagel Theater (2 episodes, 1955)
- Douglas Fairbanks, Jr., Presents (1 episode, 1955) as Mary
- Peter Gunn (1 episode, 1959) as Mrs. 'J'
- Markham (1 episode, 1959) as Landlady
- The Lawless Years (2 episodes, 1959) as Jane Morrison
- The Millionaire (1 episode, 1960) as Martha Chambers
- Alfred Hitchcock Presents (2 episodes, 1959–1960)
  - (Season 4 Episode 24: "The Avon Emeralds") (1959) as Aunt Catherine Sedley
  - (Season 5 Episode 33: "Party Line") (1960) as Betty Nubbins
- General Electric Theater (1 episode, 1961) as Mrs. McQueen
- The Loretta Young Show (1 episode, 1961) as Lettie Harron
- The Law and Mr. Jones (1 episode, 1961) as Vera's Friend
- The Twilight Zone (1 episode, 1961) as Rose Kramer
- Maverick (3 episodes, 1959–1961) as Dorritt MacGregor
- Have Gun - Will Travel (1 episode, 1961) as Mona Lansing
- The Lawman (1 episode, 1962) as Miss Selma
- Hazel (1 episode, 1962) as Hilda
- Dr. Kildare (2 episodes, 1961–1963) as Eleanor Quayle
- The Farmer's Daughter (1 episode, 1965) as Mrs. Buchanan
- The Alfred Hitchcock Hour (3 episodes, 1963–1965)
  - (Season 1 Episode 18: "A Tangled Web") (1963) as Ethel Chesterman
  - (Season 2 Episode 3: "Terror at Northfield") (1963) as Flora Sloan
  - (Season 3 Episode 27: "The Second Wife") (1965) as Peggy Gilfoyle
- Perry Mason (4 episodes, 1960–1966) as Agatha Culpepper
- Gunsmoke (3 episodes, 1959–1967) as Essie Benlan, Mrs. Blouze
- The F.B.I. (1 episode, 1968) as Ruth Kolner
- Hawaii Five-O (1 episode, 1968) as Landlady
- Medical Center (1 episode, 1970) as Mrs. Sorenson
- The Bold Ones: The New Doctors (1 episode, 1972) as Mrs. Ross
- Ladies of the Corridor (1975) as Mary Linscott
- Charlie's Angels (1 episode, 1976) as Grace Rodeheaver
- The Love Boat (1 episode, 1977) as Mrs. Pendleton
- The Tony Randall Show (2 episodes, 1976–1977) as Kim Reubner
- How the West Was Won (1978) as Clara
- Eight Is Enough (1 episode, 1979) as Mrs. Walker
- Three's Company (1 episode, 1982) as Mrs. Peabody
- Hill Street Blues (1 episode, 1984) as Mrs. Parsons
- Seduced (1985) as Mrs. Youngquist
- Something in Common (1986) as Aunt Celia
- Outlaws (1 episode, 1987) as Liz' Wade (final appearance)
