= Harvey Tyson =

Journalist and Author

- Born: 27 September 1928; Johannesburg
- Died: 30 November 2018 (aged 90)
- Education: Kingswood College
- Years active: 1947–1990

Harvey Wood Tyson (27 September 1928 – 30 November 2018) was a South African journalist and author. He began his career as a cadet newspaper reporter at the age of 18 before becoming a general and senior reporter, a political correspondent, a columnist, a newspaper editor, a private and published socio-political consultant and an author of non-fiction books.

== Biography ==
Born in Johannesburg, he was educated at Kingswood College, Grahamstown, 1937–1945. He was awarded a bursary to Rhodes University in the first post-war year of 1946, but left after a year to join The Star newspaper in Johannesburg in 1947. He studied economics and law, part-time, for the next three years at the University of SA without seeking a degree. He was invited in later years to join sabbaticals studying economics at the universities of Cape Town and Oxford.

In the first 40 years of adulthood, Tyson worked full-time on nine different newspapers in South Africa and abroad.

He was on the Diamond Fields Advertiser as a cadet journalist when it still published from a flat-bed press and, in the late 1940s, on the Pretoria News with its brand-new post-war rotary press. In the 1950s he was stationed mainly in Durban and, later, Cape Town where he became political correspondent for three Argus newspapers. In the 1960s he left newspapers briefly to act as an Assistant Adviser to the Chamber of Mines in South Africa, where he also continued to write reports and articles for general publication and help launch an industry news-sheet.

During two periods in the 1950s and 1960s, Tyson worked on the Yorkshire Press, The Kentish Times, The Scotsman in Edinburgh and The Times in London.

He also contributed to news agencies and occasionally to publications in the USA, Europe and the UK.

In the 1960s he became an assistant editor of The Daily News, Durban, and later, The Argus, Cape Town.

In 1970 he became Deputy Editor of The Star, then Editor three years later, then retired officially as Editor-in-chief of Star newspapers in 1990. Circumstances during those 20 years led The Star to producing two morning and three afternoon editions; Saturday and Sunday newspapers and an overseas weekly edition. Despite the paper struggling against censorship, its daily circulation was reaching a quarter of a million buyers in the Transvaal (an estimated one to two million readers) of all beliefs and cultures.

During his years as editor of The Star newspaper Harvey Tyson's commitment to freedom of expression was unwavering. This was evident in his daily management of the newspaper. Some of the more notable events as outlined in the Freedom of Expression Institute's submission to the Truth and Reconciliation Commission included giving instructions to his editorial executives to not identify people by race unless it was relevant in 1975; urging readers in his column to listen to the BBC for very important National and International news; convincing authorities that his copy-editor, Don Mattera would not be expressing his own views as a copy-editor; giving evidence in the second Steyn Commission of Enquiry; resigning from the Media Council for it not being representative; being charged under the Internal Security Act for quoting Oliver Tambo and refusing to "scale down" coverage of the unrest in 1985.

Before 1990 his main preoccupation as editor-in-chief of Star newspapers involved the world threat to freedom of speech and the direct threat of censorship of news in South Africa. He addressed international conferences in Canada, Italy, Holland, Britain, Spain and Turkey on these issues. In 1987, against the wishes of State President P W Botha, he convened a conference in South Africa on 'Conflict and the Press' which was supported by leading newspaper proprietors, editors and heads of radio and television news from 17 countries, including some from behind the "Iron Curtain" of Russian communism.

"In the 1983 whites-only referendum on the tricameral constitution, Harvey, uniquely among the nation's editors, refused to endorse either a yes or a no vote, instead advising readers to abstain. The newsroom derision was swift, surfacing within hours in large letters on the editor's noticeboard: "The Editor's indecision is final", it scoffed."

After his official retirement he served on the two boards of Argus Newspapers until the titles were sold to Independent Newspapers. He acted as a consultant to overseas investors; served on the board of Sussens Mann PR; and joined Editors Inc. in launching the annual South Africa at a Glance.

During his retirement he has written books in various styles on a variety of themes including:

Editors Under Fire (1993). A Walk on the Wild Side (1995). Itch of the Twitch (1996). Have Wings, Will Fly (1998). Birders of a Feather (An anthology, 1998). Laugh the Beloved Country (co-edited with author/columnist James Clarke 2001). Blood on the Path (2009).

Thereafter, he planned and wrote three more books. The first of these was part-memoir, On My Watch. The second is End of the Deadline, a history of the world's free press – and its possible future in the 2030s. The third is a travel book, exploring Vanishing Places around the world.

The books were planned to encourage a new form of inter-action between print and digital publishing. The printed books carry cross-references to online articles on similar themes and topical issues. The first, the semi-auto-biographical On My Watch was published in both print and digital in 2016 and the others were due to follow rapidly in the same technique before his anticipated 89th birthday.

Harvey Tyson and his wife Arlene retired to Hermanus on the South Cape coast in 1998, not far from his three children and one of his step-children – all of whom have, at one time or another, worked as full-time journalists or practised as regular freelance writers.

Harvey Tyson died at his home in Hermanus on 30 November 2018, surrounded by his family.
