= The Chase (1946 film) =

1946 American film noir directed by Arthur Ripley

- Theatrical release poster
- Directed by: Arthur Ripley
- Screenplay by: Philip Yordan
- Based on: The Black Path of Fear by Cornell Woolrich
- Produced by: Seymour Nebenzal
- Starring: Robert Cummings; Michèle Morgan; Steve Cochran; Peter Lorre
- Cinematography: Frank F. Planer
- Edited by: Edward Mann
- Music by: Michel Michelet
- Production company: Nero Films
- Distributed by: United Artists
- Release date: November 17, 1946 (New York City)
- Running time: 86 minutes
- Country: United States
- Language: English

The Chase (1946) by Arthur Ripley

The full film colorized

The Chase is a 1946 American film noir directed by Arthur Ripley. The screenplay by Philip Yordan is based on Cornell Woolrich's 1944 novel The Black Path of Fear. It stars Robert Cummings as Chuck Scott, a veteran who has hallucinations. When he returns a lost wallet to violent mobster Eddie Roman (Steve Cochran), Eddie offers to hire him as a chauffeur. Chuck becomes mixed up in a plot to help Eddie's wife Lorna (Michèle Morgan) run off to Havana to escape her cruel husband.

== Plot ==
Chuck Scott is a World War II veteran who is now a penniless drifter in Miami tormented by bizarre dreams. After finding a wallet and returning it to Eddie Roman, a vicious gangster, he is hired by Roman to be his driver. Roman tests his new driver, whom he nicknames Scotty, by assuming control of his car from the back seat. Scotty does not know that Roman has an accelerator in the rear passenger compartment. This bizarre trick unnerves Scotty and Roman's right-hand man Gino.

Roman reveals himself as a tough gangster by killing any competition, and is harsh and controlling with his wife, Lorna. She goes for a ride every night, and one day she asks driver Scotty to take her to Havana, Cuba in exchange for $1,000. He consents and realizes that he is in love with her. When they reach Havana, they stop for a drink at a club, where Lorna is stabbed to death.

All the evidence points to Scotty as the killer, including the fact that he had, earlier that day, apparently purchased the knife used in the murder. He realizes that he is being framed. A photograph from the club that proves Scotty's innocence is destroyed by Gino, who has come to Cuba to exact revenge against Lorna and Scotty. Scotty escapes police custody but is supposedly gunned down by Gino when he returns to the curio store from which the knife was purchased. Scotty's face is never shown during this scene.

Scotty wakes in Miami on the night that he and Lorna are supposed to abscond to Havana. He is sweating profusely and immediately takes his pills, presumably prescribed to treat his posttraumatic stress disorder from battle. He remembers nothing, and visits the naval hospital to seek treatment from his doctor, Commander Davidson. Davidson urges him to try to remember why he was dressed as a driver, but Scotty is unable to do so. The two go drinking at the Florida Club.

Lorna is shocked that Scotty abruptly quit his job and departed earlier that night, and she is locked in her room after Roman discovers her writing a letter to Scotty. Roman and Gino go to the Florida Club to cool down, unknowingly sitting across the club, and behind a partition, from Scotty. Davidson realizes that the woman whom Scotty loves is Roman's wife, but by this time, Scotty remembers where he was supposed to be and leaves to find Lorna. He rescues her and they head for the port, but Gino and Roman are also heading to the port after they discover that Scotty was seen there buying tickets earlier that morning. With Roman using his master accelerator to push the car's speed to 100 mph, the car crashes into an oncoming train, killing both gangsters. Scotty and Lorna are now free to sail to Cuba and be together.

== Cast ==
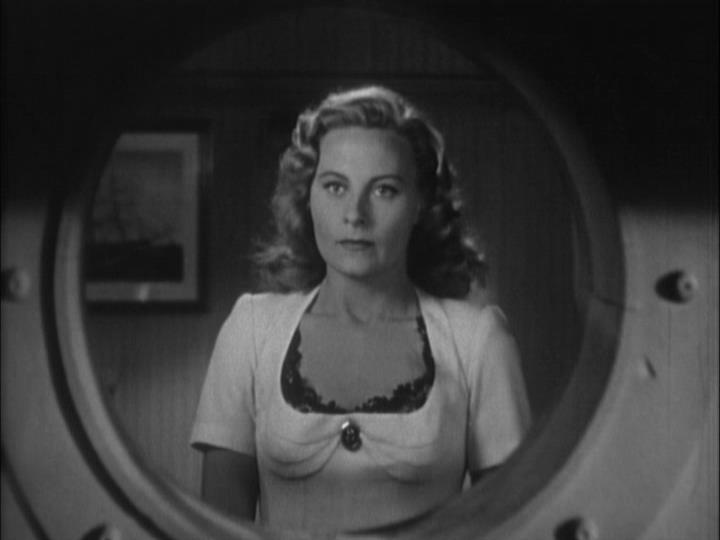
Michèle Morgan in a scene from the film

- Robert Cummings – Chuck Scott
- Michèle Morgan – Lorna Roman
- Steve Cochran – Eddie Roman
- Lloyd Corrigan – Emmerich Johnson
- Jack Holt – Cmdr. Davidson
- Peter Lorre – Gino
- Don Wilson – Fats
- Alexis Minotis – Lt. Acosta
- Nina Koshetz – Madame Chin
- Yolanda Lacca – Midnight
- James Westerfield – Job the Butler
- Jimmy Ames – The Killer

== Production ==
The Black Path of Fear was published in 1944. The New York Times praised its "fiendishly ingenious plot and thrilling episodes."

Producer Seymour Nebenzal bought the rights to the story. In January 1946, he announced Phil Yordan, with whom he had made Whistle Stop, was writing the script.

Adjustments were required for the story to comply with the Production Code. Much of the action was framed as a dream sequence so that the characters could escape the consequences of their actions. The character of Scotty was originally to reenlist in the army at the end, but veterans thought this was a bad idea, so the time of Roman's death was advanced so that Lorna could wind up with Scotty. The cause of a death in the book was changed from an attack by a mad dog to an auto accident. Adjustments to scenes set in Cuba were required to avoid upsetting the Cuban government.

In March 1946, Robert Cummings signed on to play a lead role and Joan Leslie was borrowed from Warner Bros. to costar. Arthur Ripley signed on to direct. Warner Bros. then insisted Leslie was still under contract to them, causing principal photography to be delayed by a month over the dispute. Nebenzal grew impatient and replaced Leslie with Michèle Morgan. Leslie sued Nebenzal for lost wages and damages, and she sued Warner Bros. to release her from her contract. Morgan joined the cast in May along with Steve Cochran, who was borrowed from Sam Goldwyn. Peter Lorre joined the cast in June.

Also according to Variety, production was delayed by an electrical workers' strike at RKO's Culver City studio.

== Reception ==
The Chase was entered in the 1947 Cannes Film Festival in Cannes, France. Critic Gene Arieel of The Hollywood Scene wrote: "The Chase has flaws, to be sure, but it has additionally a good share of suspense and excitement." He also noted that "the performances are indispensably good."

Leyen Decker of The Independent newspaper wrote: "The Chase is fascinating and suspenseful but falls back on the familiar dream solution as the easiest way out, and the audiences will be confused and disappointed."

In a retrospective review in The New York Times, J. Hoberman wrote: "The Chase is nothing if not arty. Mrs. Roman is dressed and posed as if she were one of the subjects of Cecil Beaton's Surrealist-inflected Vogue portraits."

Eddie Muller noted that the film "is as close as any '40s film came to the subconscious cinema of David Lynch, adroitly evoking Woolrich's world of doomed romance and terrifying helplessness."

The movie was not a financial success but became a cult favorite.

== Legacy ==
Alain Silver and Elizabeth Ward write in Film Noir: An Encyclopedic Reference to the American Style: "Phantom Lady excepted, The Chase is the best cinematic equivalent of the dark, oppressive atmosphere that characterizes most of Cornell Woolrich's best fiction."

The story was adapted for two episodes of Suspense in 1944 and 1946, starring Brian Donlevy and Cary Grant respectively, and for Lux Video Theatre in 1954. A theatrical remake by Steve Sekely was announced in late 1957 but failed to materialize.

== Home media ==
The film is in the public domain, which has led to many substandard releases. In 2012, it was restored by the UCLA Film and Television Archive, a version that has been released on DVD and Blu-ray by Kino Lorber in the U.S. It includes an audio commentary by Canadian director Guy Maddin and the two 1940s radio adaptations.

== See also ==
- List of films in the public domain in the United States
