= Outlaws (1986 TV series) =

- Created by: Nicholas J. Corea
- Starring: Rod Taylor; William Lucking; Patrick Houser; Charles Napier; Richard Roundtree; Christina Belford
- Country of origin: United States
- Original language: English
- No. of seasons: 1
- No. of episodes: 13

Production
- Executive producer: Nicholas Corea
- Running time: 60 minutes
- Production companies: Mad Dog Productions; Universal Television

Original release
- Network: CBS
- Release: December 28, 1986 – May 30, 1987

Outlaws is an American science fiction Western television series which aired Saturday nights on CBS from December 28, 1986 until May 30, 1987. The original series began as a 2-hour pilot movie, and was followed by eleven one-hour episodes.

== Plot ==
The story begins in Houston, Texas in 1899, as Sheriff Jonathan Grail tried to round up the villainous four-man Pike Gang, of which he had once been a member. After cornering the gang in a stormy Native American graveyard, a bolt of lightning struck all five men - transporting them 87 years forward in time to 1986. With no way to get back to their original time, the five men agreed to a truce, and started a private investigation/detective agency to pay their bills.

The five men, now working as the "Double Eagle Detection Agency," helped right wrongs, protected the downtrodden, and fought off drug lords and gang leaders, all while continuing to operate with 19th-century weaponry, including revolvers and shotguns. Several of the episodes dealt with problems the men faced in the 1880s that had to be resolved in the 1980s. No one knew their real identities, and most people assumed that their old-style clothing and weapons were an affectation. During their first case they met Lt. Maggie Randall, a Houston detective, who became romantically involved with Grail and often helped them in their cases.

The series featured crime drama and shootouts, although the heroes never killed anyone, thanks to their superior marksmanship. The show also featured humorous moments. The humor derived primarily from the outlaws' unfamiliarity with 20th-century technology, as well as the contrast between their 19th-century mores and those of the 20th century. Most episodes featured flashbacks, which were done in a sepia tone.

Although the pilot episode was one of the most-watched shows that week, future episodes drew fewer and fewer fans. The series' final episode, in fact, featured a "flashback" scene from another television show, The Oregon Trail, in which Outlaws actors Rod Taylor and Charles Napier both starred.

== Characters ==
Character	Actor
Sheriff Jonathan Grail, former member of the Pike Gang and now leader of the Double Eagle Detection Agency	Rod Taylor
Harland Pike, who took over the gang when Grail left	William Lucking
Billy Pike, Jr., Harland Pike's younger brother	Patrick Houser
Wolfson Lucas, a born-again half-breed Native American scout	Charles Napier
Isaiah "Ice" McAdams, an escaped slave from New Orleans who rode with the Pike Gang	Richard Roundtree
Deputy Maggie Randall, who assisted the Double Eagle Detection Agency on several of their cases	Christina Belford

== Episodes ==
No. in season	Title	Directed by	Written by	Original release date
1 2	"Outlaws (pilot episode)"	Peter Werner	Nicholas J. Corea	December 28, 1986
Sheriff Jonathan Grail corners the villainous Pike Gang in a Native American graveyard; as all five men braced for a showdown, a bolt of lightning struck the cemetery - and all five men - hurtling them 100 years into the future. Several of the Outlaws run afoul of a drug lord, and it's up to the rest of the Outlaws, working together in an unfamiliar era, to stop the drug lord. Shannen Doherty, in an early role, appears in this episode, along with Avery Schreiber, Wendy Girard and Lewis Van Bergen.
3	"Tintype"	Don Chaffey	Deborah Dean Davis	January 3, 1987
While working security for a wealthy client, Harland Pike discovers that the client's wife is a mirror image of his long-lost love from the 19th century. When the woman shows signs of physical abuse, the Outlaws rescue her and her son, only to discover her husband has an evil streak in him and wants to take it out on the Outlaws. Stars Richard Roundtree, Jack Hogan and Leigh Taylor-Young.
4	"Primer"	Frank Orsatti	Bruce Cervi	January 10, 1987
While trying to stop a protection racket that preys on shopkeepers, Billy Pike joins an adult education class (he never learned to read in the 19th century), where he comes face to face with the leader of the protection racket, whose followers are also terrorizing the adult education class. Also stars Mary-Margaret Humes, Julius Harris and James Hong.
5	"Orleans"	Phil Bondelli	Nicholas J. Corea	January 17, 1987
Running short on cash, Ice McAdams (Richard Roundtree) leads the Outlaws to a treasure of buried gold coins he once stole from his slave overseer; it leads him to participate in a duel with his master's great-grandson. Also stars Denny Miller, Sandy McPeak and Lynne Moody.
6	"Hymn"	Phil Bondelli	Tom Szollosi	January 31, 1987
The Outlaws travel to New York City to protect a female televangelist (Samantha Eggar) from a murderous stalker. During the episode, Wolfson Lucas and the televangelist battle over each other's view of faith and worship. Also stars Gregory Itzin, Grand L. Bush and Anthony James.
7	"Madrid"	Alan J. Levi	Nicholas J. Corea	February 7, 1987
Jonathan Grail and the Outlaws are hired to watch over the ghost town of Madrid, which has been purchased by a man to build a new shopping center. Unbeknownst to the Outlaws, the owner's wife is plotting to steal the town for her own uses - and compounding matters is the town's oldest living resident, who remembers the day Jonathan Grail (in the 19th century, and as a villain) shot down his father. Also stars Lew Ayres, Ben Piazza, Jeff MacKay, Gertrude Flynn and Claudia Christian.
8	"Potboiler"	Frank Orsatti	Timothy Burns	February 28, 1987
A Western historian has discovered that the Double Eagle Detection Agency's members look remarkably like his archival photograph of the Pike Gang from 1885. Meanwhile, the Outlaws have to stop a crime lord - and keep the inquisitive historian at bay. Also stars Irwin Keyes, Gary Armagnac, Aubrey Morris and Marshall Teague.
9	"Pursued"	Phil Bondelli	Robert Heverly	March 7, 1987
The Outlaws must find the estranged daughter of a dying mob leader - only to discover that not only does the daughter not want to see her father, but that there are several members of the mob who want to find her father - even if it means abducting the daughter. Also stars Hoke Howell, Lee de Broux, Robin Dearden, Lar Park Lincoln and Michael Preston.
10	"Independents"	Bernard McEveety	Nicholas J. Corea	March 21, 1987
The Outlaws work as taxi drivers to protect an independent cab fleet from the vicious competition. Also stars Judith Chapman, Tammy Lauren and Robert O'Reilly.
11	"Hardcase"	Frank Orsatti	Nicholas J. Corea	March 28, 1987
After the Outlaws take in a troubled youth who is on the run from a murderous crime lord, Billy Pike realizes the teen's rebellious attitude was the same attitude that turned Pike to a life of crime - and now must be diverted to a path of good. Also stars Lee Paul, Richard Coca, Gerard Prendergast and Sandy Ward.
12	"Jackpot"	Phil Bondelli	David Chisholm	April 4, 1987
After another successful job completed, the Outlaws are rewarded with a trip to Las Vegas - where they must protect an accountant who has valuable information that could put a mob family away for good. Also stars Anthony Eisley, Ethan Phillips and Jan Gan Boyd.
13	"Birthday"	Nicholas J. Corea	Nicholas J. Corea	May 2, 1987
After the Outlaws take some time to prepare a birthday party for Detective Maggie Randall, the Double Eagle Detection Agency ranch comes under siege from sharpshooters. During the episode, thinking it might be their last moments together, Grail confides a story about how he and Wolfson Lucas first met - featuring film footage from a television series, The Oregon Trail, in which both actors starred.

== Low ratings and cancellation ==
Outlaws was considered a "high concept" series, mixing three separate genres - time travel, the Western, and a detective series. After very high ratings for the series pilot, Outlaws aired its regular episodes on Saturday nights, where it struggled to find an audience. It was cancelled in May 1987.
