= Kingswood College (South Africa) =

Location
- Makhanda, Eastern Cape; South Africa; 33°18′14″S 26°31′52″E

Information
- School type: Private & Boarding
- Motto: Studia Hilaritate Proveniunt (In Cheerfulness, Is The Success Of Our Studies)
- Religious affiliation: Methodist Church
- Established: 14 March 1894; 132 years ago
- Founders: Clifford Witheridge Dold; William Burnett Stocks; Richard Restall Stocks
- Locale: Suburban
- School number: +27 (046) 603 6600
- Headmaster: Mr Leon Grové
- Exam board: IEB
- Grades: Pre-Primary (Grade 000 - Grade R) to Grade 12, then Bridging Year (Post Matric).
- Gender: Boys & Girls
- Age: 3 to 18
- Enrollment: 650 pupils
- Language: English
- Schedule: 08:00 - 14:00
- Campus: Urban Campus
- Colours: Red; Black; Gold
- Nickname: Kingswoodian
- Rivals: Diocesan School for Girls, Grahamstown; St. Andrew's College, Grahamstown; Graeme College
- Affiliations: Cambridge International Schools; ISASA; Round Square
- Alumni: Old Kingswoodians
- Fees: R86,150 to R157,710 for boarders R20,850 to R88,725 for day students
- Website: www.kingswoodcollege.com

Kingswood College is an independent, co-educational Methodist school in Makhanda, (formerly Grahamstown). Founded in 1894 by Clifford Witheridge Dold, William Burnett Stocks and Richard Restall Stocks, Kingswood caters for boys and girls from Grade 0000 to Grade 13 (Bridging Year) from all over the world.

At Kingswood College, the National Senior Certificate examination is administered by the Independent Examinations Board.

== History ==
Kingswood College was founded in March 1894 by Clifford Witheridge Dold, William Burnett Stocks and Richard Restall Stocks, who considered that there was a need for a school for boys on the same lines of the local Wesleyan High School for Girls. The foresight of the four visionaries initially led to the establishment of the Wesleyan Collegiate School for Boys, which subsequently became Kingswood College. The first Trust Deed formalising the establishment of Kingswood College was notarially executed by Lorimer Dold on 20 August 1895.

The College was based on the British Public School model and until 1972 was a boys only school, becoming co-educational in 1973, when the first girls were enrolled, and fully co-educational by 1975.

The school is closely associated with Kingswood School, in Bath, England. As a Methodist School, it has close ties with St Stithians and Kearsney College.

== Governance ==
The Kingswood College Council (or Board of Governors) bears an overall responsibility for the School's corporate governance by leading, governing and monitoring the overall business of the College. The composition of the Council covers a range of professional expertise and members are drawn from around the country, including an elected parent representative from each of the Junior and Senior Schools.

The College Council is made up of nominated and elected members, with members of Senior Management also in attendance at meetings as Invitees. In terms of the provisions of the College's Deed of Trust, the President of the Old Kingswoodian Club is the Official Trustee.

== Campus ==
Kingswood College campus is located on the Eastern side of Makhanda (Grahamstown) in the Eastern Cape of South Africa. Running directly through the campus is Burton Street, which was internally renamed in 2019 as Rev Dr Simon Gqubule Avenue in recognition of the late Methodist Presiding Bishop.

The College campus comprises a mix of buildings, combining the historic older buildings with newer ones being built through the 20th and 21st century. The first buildings of Kingswood College were designed by architect William White-Cooper. His design was in the Queen Anne Revival style, with its typical red brick, prominent gables and white painted woodwork. This distinctive style is interspersed on the campus with various historical buildings.

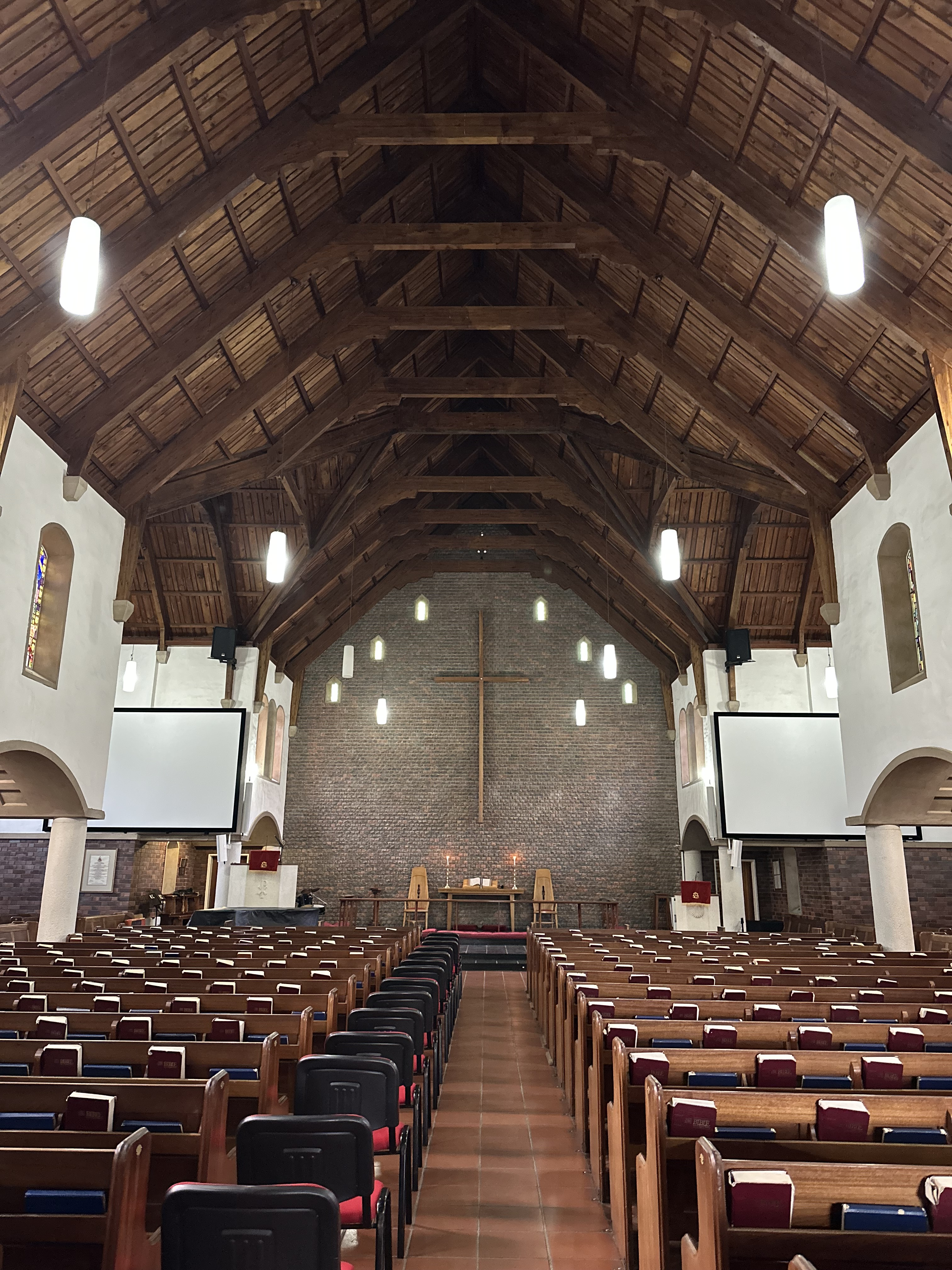
The Kingswood Memorial Chapel, built in remembrance of all Kingswoodians whose lives were lost in the violence of World War 1 and 2, was opened in 1962.

The Memorial Chapel

From Kingswood's foundation in 1894 until 1961, the historic Commemoration Methodist Church in Grahamstown (dating back to 1850) was the de facto College Chapel, with Kingswood pupils occupying the pews in the gallery. In 1962, the College's Memorial Chapel was consecrated, occupying a strategic and pivotal position on the campus between the Junior and Senior schools. Designed by an Old Kingswoodian architect and built in a cruciform shape, with North and South transepts and ambulatories, it has a pipe organ and numerous stained glass windows. A Norman style clock tower rises above the entrance to the Chapel.

Boarding at Kingswood

Kingswood has six Seniors School boarding houses, and two Junior School boarding houses.

Senior School:

- School House was built in 1894 and housed both Chubb and Gane House. In 1996, the house almost entirely destroyed by a fire. Rebuilt in its original style, School House once again houses both Chubb and Gane House.
  - Chubb House: named after former Principal, The Reverend Theophilus Chubb (1892-1898).
  - Gane House: named after former Headmaster, Colonel Ernest G Gane (1892-1927).
- Wood House: named in 1921 after Henry Richard Wood, one of Kingswood's founders and Chairman of the College Council from 1896 – 1921. It was originally a single storied structure known as Stanton's Wagon Factory and is the oldest building on campus.
- Jagger House: named in recognition of John William Jagger, a Johannesburg businessman and educational philanthropist who donated generously to the school.
- Jacques House: named after Reverend Dr George Henry Paul Jacques CMG MBE, who became Chairman of the College Council from 1938-1946. Originally the Main House of the Wesleyan High School for Girls (built in 1882), it was taken over by Kingswood in 1935.
- Kirkby House: named after Reverend Howard Kirkby for his contributions to Kingswood. It was officially opened in 2005.
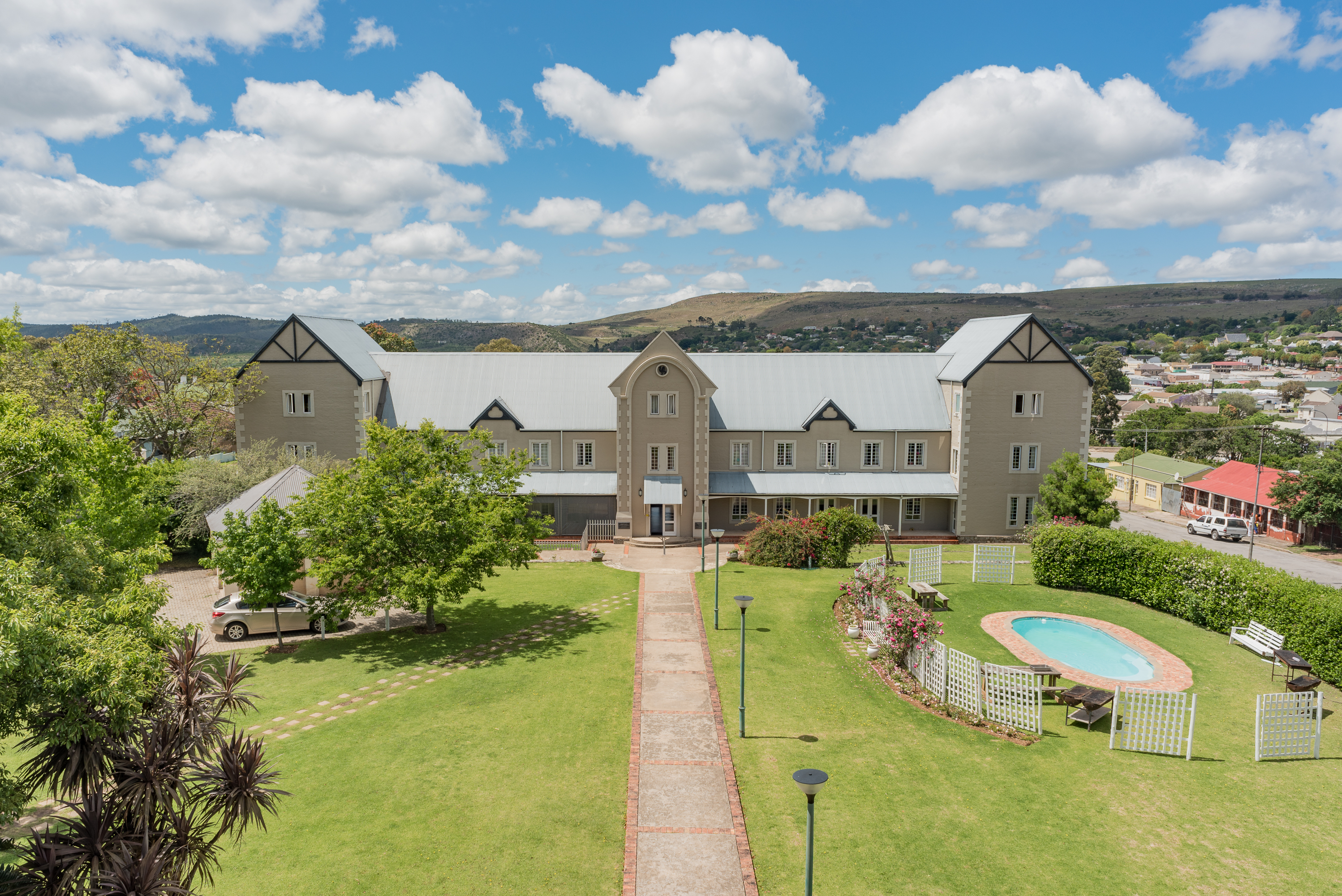

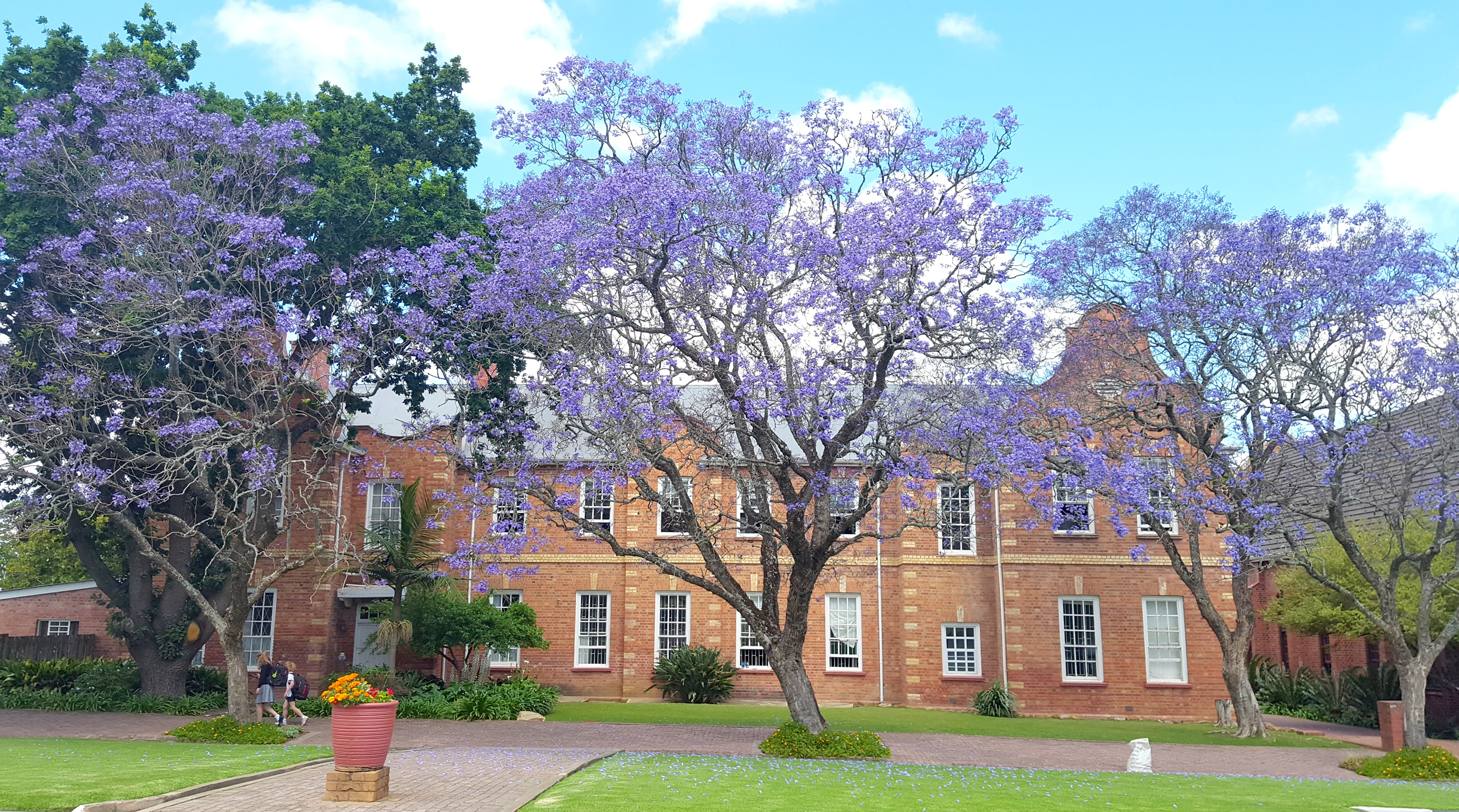

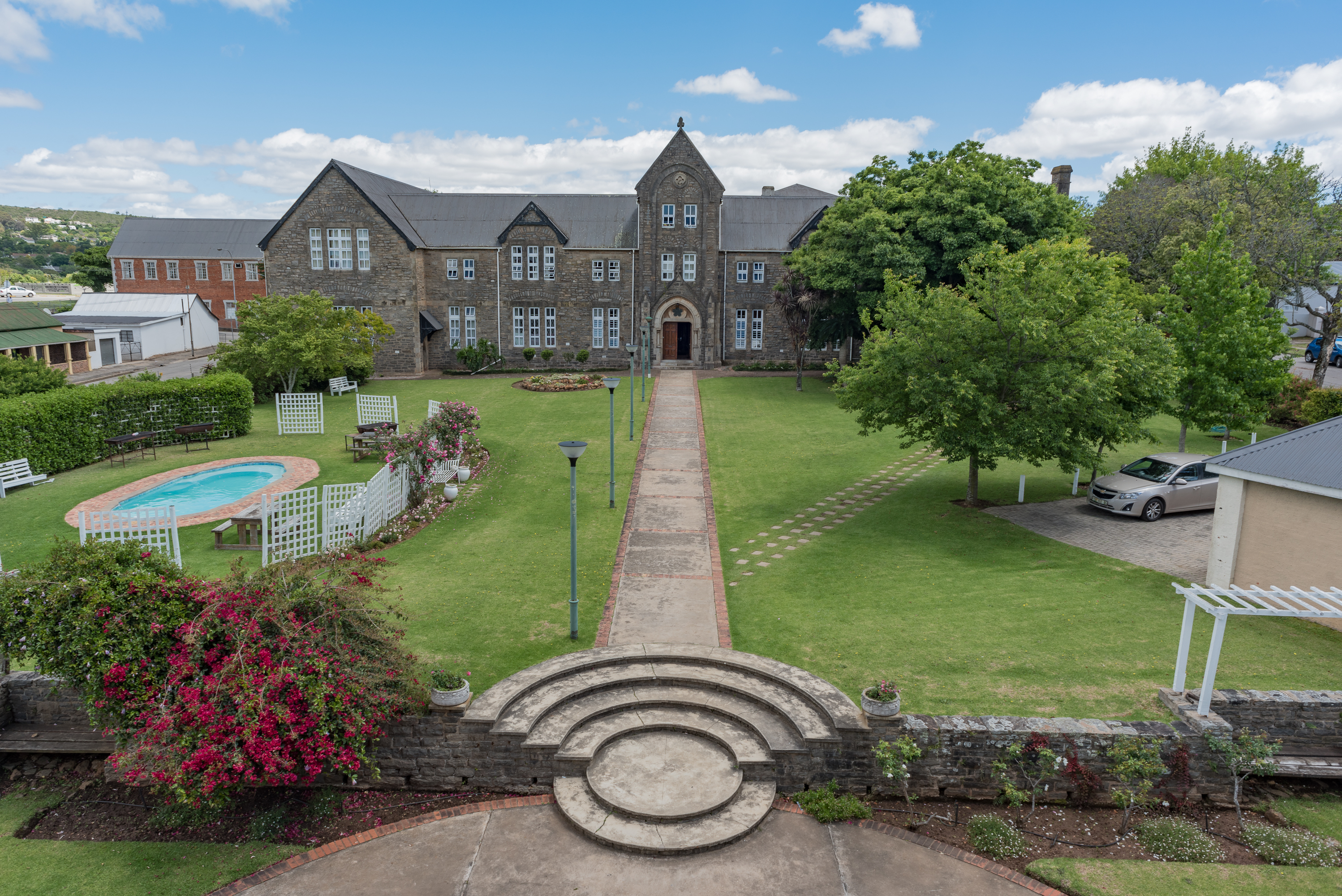

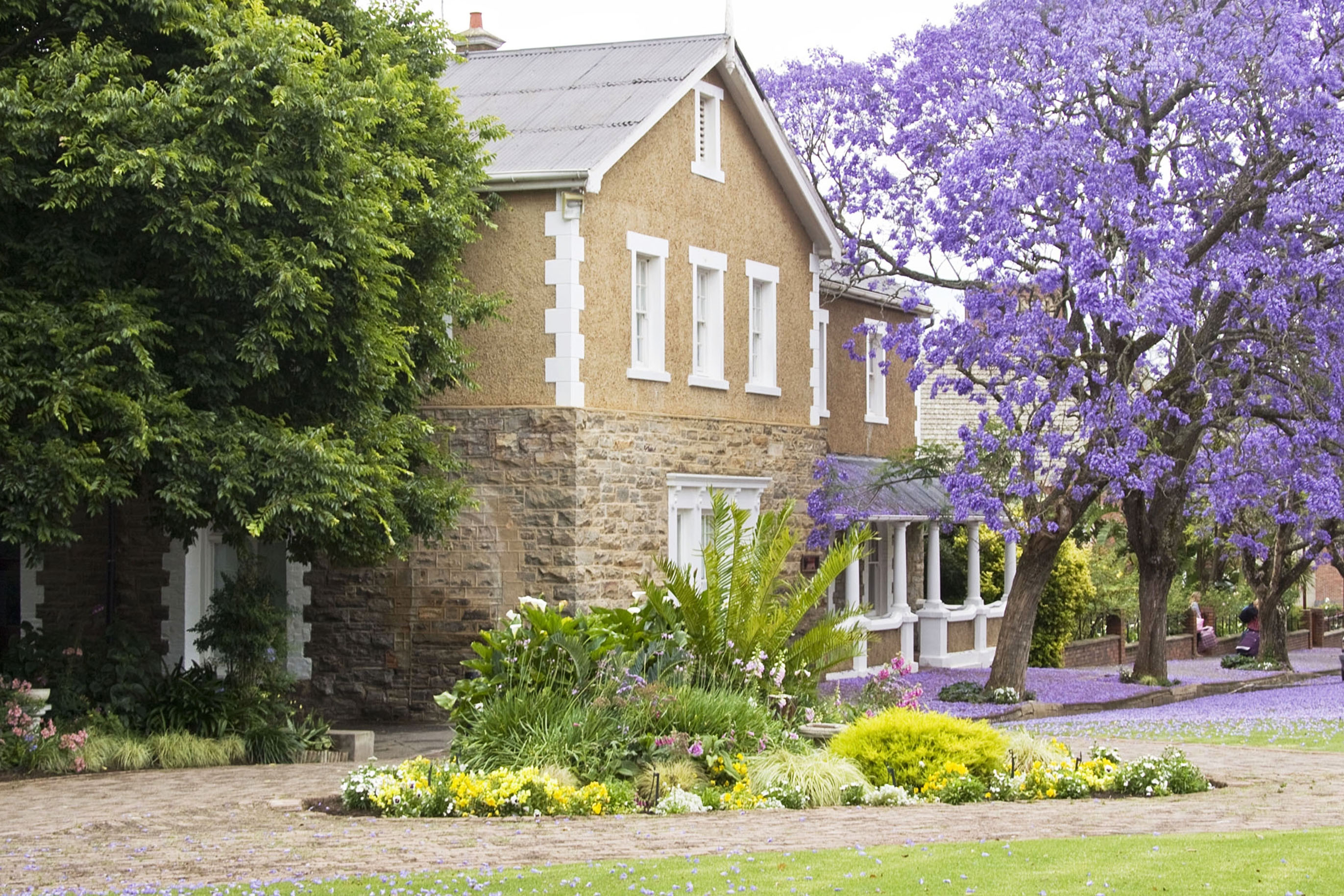

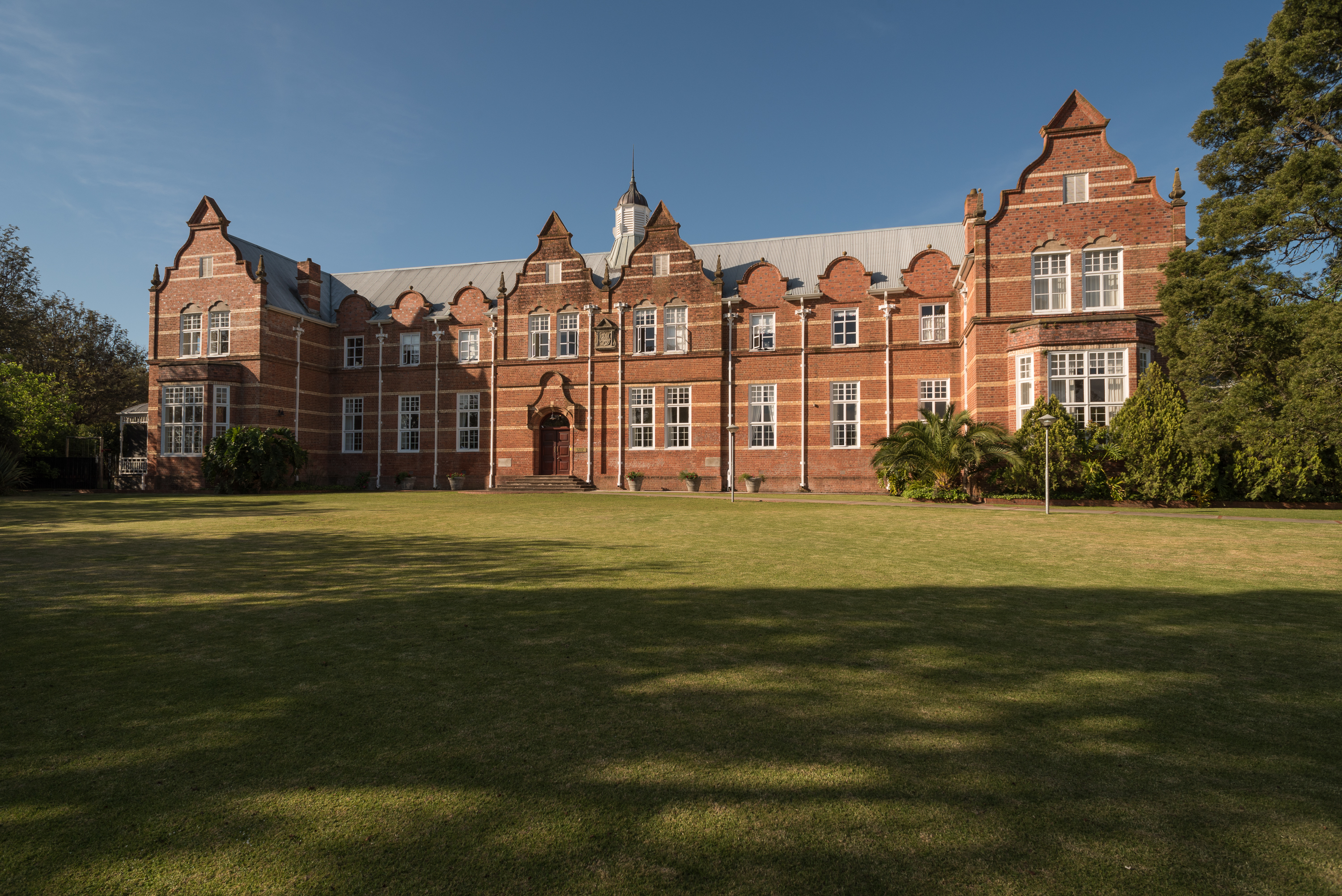

Junior School:

- Hobson House, originally built as a private dwelling for Richard Restall Stocks, the house was converted to Kingswood accommodation in 1969. In 2017 it was demolished and construction commenced in 2018 to build the new Hobson House.
- Van Vuuren Village: named after retired maintenance manager, Eben van Vuuren for his contributions to Kingswood, and consists of a number of adjoining Kingswood properties.

The Junior School also has four sports houses, namely:

- Rich House: named after Captain Cecil Oliver Rich, who was Headmaster from 1949-1954.
- Slater House: named after Jack Slater, who was Headmaster from 1958-1963.
- Tarr House: named after Ray Tarr, Who was Junior School Headmaster from 1955-1968.
- Dacam House: named after Charles Dacam, who was Headmaster from 1964-1970.

Music School

The Music School is situated in the historic Walton House. The Music School is home to seven music teachers who offer a wide range of instruments including flute, oboe, clarinet, bassoon, saxophone, trumpet, trombone, French horn, tuba, euphonium, violin, cello, double bass, piano and organ.

Music as an academic subject begins in Grade 8 and continues through to Grade 12, while class music is a key component of the core curriculum for all pupils from Grade 1 to Grade 9.

== Notable alumni ==
=== Academia, politics, business ===
- Allan Mossop, Chief Judge of the British Supreme Court of China
- Neil Aggett, medical doctor and political activist who died in police custody
- Rear Admiral Chris Bennett, South African Navy and author
- Dr Nico Malan, administrator of the Cape Province
- Uyinene Mrwetyana, key figure in the movement against gender-based violence in South Africa
- David Divine CBE DSM, author (also under the pen name David Rame) and defence correspondent for the UK's Sunday Times
- Wally Judge, general manager of the Cape Times
- Jeremy Mansfield, radio and television presenter and author
- Harvey Tyson, editor of Johannesburg's The Star newspaper and author
- Graham Beck, founder of the Kangra Group
- Geoffrey de Jager, entrepreneur, founder of Rand Merchant Bank

=== Sport ===
- Eric Davies, cricketer for South Africa
- Russell Domingo, cricket coach for South Africa and Bangladesh
- Trevor Gripper, cricketer for Zimbabwe
- Denys Hobson, cricketer for South Africa
- Neil Johnson, cricketer for Zimbabwe
- Meyrick Pringle, cricketer for South Africa
- Brett Schultz, cricketer for South Africa
- David Denton, Zimbabwean-born Scottish rugby union player
- Grant Hattingh, rugby union player
- Fabian Juries, rugby union and rugby sevens player for South Africa 7s
- Bennie Osler, rugby union player for South Africa
- Rosko Specman, rugby union and rugby sevens player
- Henry Walker, English rugby union player
- Brett Wilkinson, rugby union coach
- Walter Babb, hurdler representing Northern Rhodesia at the 1964 Summer Olympics
- Howard Q Davies, hurdler and medallist at the 1930 British Empire Games
- Trevor Haynes, long-distance runner representing Northern Rhodesia at the 1964 Summer Olympics
- Luntu Ntloko, field hockey player and Olympian
- Trevor Fancutt, tennis player
