= Red Cross Hospital, Athens =

Red Cross Hospital Νοσοκομείο Ερυθρός Σταυρός
- Hellenic Red Cross

Geography
- Location: Athens, Attica, Greece
- Coordinates: 37.9916°N 23.7694°E

Organisation
- Care system: Public
- Type: District General

Services
- Emergency department: Yes
- Beds: 185

History
- Founded: 1930
- Demolished: May 21, 1995; 31 years ago

Links
- Website: http://www.korgialenio-benakio.gr/
- Lists: Hospitals in Greece

The Red Cross Hospital (Greek: Νοσοκομείο Ερυθρός Σταυρός) or General Prefectural Athens Korgialenio Benakeio Hellenic Red Cross Hospital is a district general hospital in the Erythros Stavros (Red Cross) district of Athens.

The design of the building that currently houses the hospital was commissioned in 1923 to the architect Aristeidis Balanos, while its foundation stone was laid on April 7, 1927. The construction was entrusted to a German company and the official opening took place on November 23, 1930. The date of first operation is mentioned as 15 December 1930. Initially the hospital operated with 2 clinics (Pathology and Surgery) and 4 laboratories (Radiology, Biochemistry, Microbiology and Pathology). Its strength reached 185 beds. In the following decades, there were continuous expansions of the hospital, which reached its current form in 1978 with the construction of a 9-story wing.

The administration of the hospital tried during the 90s to further expand its facilities by completing a building that had been unfinished for years at the junction of Mesogeion Avenue and Sofias Schliemann Street. Nevertheless, and by decision of the Town Planning Department, the building in question was deemed unsuitable and was demolished with controlled explosions on May 21, 1995. In its place, the Errikos Dynan Hospital was built 6 years later.
