= Peter de Jager =

Computer engineer

Peter de Jager (born 1955) is a South African-born Canadian computer engineer, best known for his Y2K early 1990s outcry warning; he is the namesake of the de Jager Year 2000 index, which began trading on the American Stock Exchange in 1997.

De Jager co-authored Countdown Y2K: Business Survival Planning for the Year 2000, and periodically writes for Canada's Municipal World magazine, focusing on change management.

== Y2K ==
In a 2023 documentary, De Jager said: "In 1977, I started as an operator with IBM. First day on the job, I noticed that our systems were using two-digit years. When I brought it up to management, management said, 'Don't worry about it, it isn't going to happen for another 23 years so relax.' I did."

In 1993, de Jager wrote "Doomsday 2000", a three-page article about the effects of simple date calculations, and testified before the US Congress and the Canadian parliament in 1996. His initial estimate of the cost of fixing Y2K was "between $50 billion and $70 billion", which was subsequently reported to have been too low: Numbers like "only" $200 billion to over $300 billion proved more correct (for world-wide expenditures), with $120 billion by USA firms.

De Jager registered and built www.year2000.com, a website he later sold.

Part of his "we don't know in advance what will fail, ... so we have to fix everything" message was quoted by The New York Times in the summer of 1998, which listed examples of cascading effects on "smoke alarms, lighting systems and even thermostats in individual apartments." Fears of elevators that would go up and not come down were reported.

Although de Jager was quoted as not owning "a single share of any year-2000 stock" and that he "never mentioned a vendor from the stage" his year2000.com website had "a list of Y2K consultants and experts;" Forbes magazine wrote that he "makes money selling advertising on his Y2K web site."

In 2009, the Lifeboat Foundation presented de Jager with its Guardian Award, with this citation: "The 2009 Lifeboat Foundation Guardian Award has been given to Peter de Jager on the tenth anniversary of Y2K which he helped avert. This award is in recognition of his 1993 warning which alerted the world to the potential disaster that might have occurred on January 1, 2000 and his efforts in the following years to create global awareness of the problem, and the possible solutions. His presentations, articles, and more than 2,000 media interviews contributed significantly to the world’s mobilization to avoid that fate."

== Personal life ==
De Jager was born in South Africa in 1955. He and his wife, Antoinette, have two sons.
