= Yager (surname) =

Yager is a surname. Notable people with the surname include:

- Adelaide Yager Rameson (1892–1973), née Yager, American tennis player
- Arthur Yager (1858–1941), governor of Puerto Rico
- Arthur William Yager (1884–1967), Australian politician
- Brayden Yager (born 2005), Canadian ice hockey player
- Carol Yager (1960–1994), American woman and heaviest woman ever recorded
- Edwin K. Yager (1925–2019), American psychologist and hypnotherapist
- Henry Yager (before 1802–1860), farmer, businessman and political figure in Upper Canada
- Henry Yager (footballer) (1874–1915), Australian rules footballer
- Ken Yager (born 1947), Tennessee state senator
- Rick Yager (1909–1995), American cartoonist
- Ronald R. Yager, American computer scientist
- William Overall Yager (1833–1904), American Civil War army officer and Virginia state senator
