= Kay Jäger =

German politician (born 1992)

Member of the Hamburg Parliament
- Incumbent
- Assumed office 26 March 2025
- Constituency: Billstedt – Wilhelmsburg – Finkenwerder

Personal details
- Born: 1992 (age 33–34)
- Party: Die Linke (since 2018)

Kay Jäger (born 1992) is a German politician serving as a member of the Hamburg Parliament since 2025. He is the spokesperson for ports, public enterprises and trade unions of the Die Linke group in the Parliament.
