= De Jagers Pass =

Coordinates: 32°04′35.8″S 22°44′50.7″E

De Jagers Pass is situated in the Western Cape province of South Africa, off-road, near Beaufort West.
