= Geoffrey de Jager =

South African entrepreneur

Geoffrey John de Jager
- Born: 2 October 1950 (age 75); Oudtshoorn, South Africa
- Children: Four

Geoffrey De Jager (born 2 October 1950 Oudtshoorn, South Africa) is a retired entrepreneur and philanthropist. He is currently the owner of Anglo Suisse Investments Limited alongside various charitable positions at The Rhodes University UK Trust, The Oxford Philharmonic Orchestra, Chairman of Classics For All (a national campaign to get classical languages and the study of ancient civilisations back into state schools in the UK launched in 2010) and The Sparrow Schools Foundation.

== Personal life ==
Geoffrey was born in Oudtshoorn, South Africa. He is married to Caroline and they have four children. He resides in Oxford, United Kingdom.

== Education ==
Geoffrey de Jager attended Kingswood College in Grahamstown, and then went on to graduate from Rhodes University with a B.Com in 1973. In 1975 Geoffrey graduated from Natal University with an LLB.

On 14 April 2012 Rhodes University conferred on him the degree of Doctor of Laws, honoris causa. In 2008 Geoffrey became an honorary fellow at Trinity College, Oxford University where he is also a member of the Chancellor's Court of Benefactors.

== Career ==
Geoffrey began his career as a lawyer, but soon turned to banking in South Africa.

=== Rand Merchant Bank ===
In 1980, Geoffrey was among the founding directors of Rand Merchant Bank with GT Ferreira, Laurie Dippenaar and Paul Harris. He served here as executive director for seven years.

=== Anglo Suisse Investments Holdings ===
The financial sector continued to be his main focus of attention after immigrating to the UK in 1987 – there establishing two stock-broking firms, and later founding, together with his twin brother Douglas, an investment company, Anglo Suisse Investments Holdings that concentrated on manufacturing in South Africa, the UK and Australia. In South Africa their activities were conducted through Lenco Holding Limited which was engaged in the manufacture of blow moulding PVC and plastic containers and injection-moulded caps for the packaging industry and also produced foamed styrene trays for the food industry and PVC cling film.

One of Anglo Suisse's main UK companies was Sharp Interpack, a company in which Geoffrey invested heavily, and one of the first food-packaging companies in the UK to make extensive use of recycled materials – so successfully that in 2009, at the prestigious Best Factory Awards ceremony it received the top award for its commitment to health, safety and the environment. Demonstrating that environmentalism can be compatible with business success, Sharp captured more than 60% of the UK's packaging market by 2010. In 2010 Sharp was sold for an undisclosed amount to Groupe Guillin

=== Other Business Interests ===
The above have not been Geoffrey de Jager's only business interests – others include a company involved in the high-tech extraction and analysis of DNA. He has served on numerous boards including, Lenco Holdings Limited and Malbak Ltd.

== Charitable works and other donations ==
Geoffrey is a patron of the Sparrow Schools Foundation, which provides remedial and special education to disadvantaged primary school children living in Johannesburg.

In 2008, in recognition of his being a considerable benefactor of Trinity College Oxford and Oxford University, Geoffrey was elected a Sir Thomas Pope Honorary Fellow at Trinity College and in 2013 he was elected to a full Honorary Fellowship. He is a member of the Vice-Chancellor's Circle of Oxford University.

Geoffrey has been in his role as a trustee of the Rhodes University UK Trust for several years, and as chair of the Trust since 2010. This Trust is a registered UK charity and provides funding and support for the university's educational activities. In his new role as chair Geoffrey de Jager has re-aligned the work of the Trust, opening new doors and networking opportunities.

In January 2014, Geoffrey was awarded the title of Life President of Oxford Philharmonic Orchestra for his loyal and unwavering support and outstanding contributions to the Orchestra. The Oxford Philharmonic is Oxford University's orchestra in residence which collaborates with the faculty of music in educational programmes for the student community.

Geoffrey and his wife Caroline have been significant benefactors of Oxford's Ashmolean Museum. They are mentioned as donors for the redevelopment of the Ashmolean, and as major founders of the Museum's outreach programme for a Secondary Education Officer, as well as the Museum's successful 2012 acquisition of an important Manet painting.

In 2012 Geoffrey was appointed as a new member of the International Council at The Global Leadership Fund. Since 2016 he has been Chairman of Classics for All, a charity that provides funding for the teaching of Classics in state schools in the UK.

In 2015 Geoffrey was made a Trustee of The Gunmakers' Company Charitable Trust and on 28 February 2019 became its chairman. The Charity supports the education and technical skills and apprenticeships as well as supporting families and individuals in need and funding programmes to combat knife crime.
