= Margarete Jäger =

German linguist

Margret Jäger (author's name) or Margarete Jäger (born March 15, 1951, in Duisburg) is a German linguist and director of the Duisburg Institute for Linguistic and Social Research (DISS).

== Scientific biography ==
After studying economics (diploma) 1972-1977 and a second degree in German studies 1985–1990, both in Duisburg, Jäger received his doctorate in 1995 at the Department of Literature and Linguistics at the Carl von Ossietzky University of Oldenburg.

Her areas of work at the DISS are studies on political, media and everyday discourses in the Federal Republic of Germany with a focus on gender, racism, migration and right-wing extremism.

Margret Jäger worked closely with her husband, the linguist Siegfried Jäger. Together they developed the research methodology of "critical discourse analysis" at the DISS, which is also known as the "Duisburg School" after its approach. It is a further development of the discourse theories of Michel Foucault, Jürgen Link and Siegfried Jäger.

== Political biography ==
Together with Manfred Coppik, Karl-Heinz Hansen, Brigitte Kiechle, Herwart Achterberg, Harald Wolf, Marie Veit and others, she was a member of the 1st Federal Executive Committee. Federal Executive Committee (November 28, 1982, to January 14, 1984) of the Democratic Socialists party founded in 1982. Margret Jäger was also co-editor of the magazine Revier. Zeitung für das Ruhrgebiet, founded in 1978, which was temporarily published by the Duisburg-based Margret Jäger Revier Verlag, which she managed from 1977 to 1985.

== Writings ==
- as ed. with Siegfried Jäger: Baustellen. Contributions to the discourse history of contemporary Germany. 1996, ISBN 3-927388-56-4.
- Fatale Effekte. The critique of patriarchy in the immigration discourse. 1996, ISBN 3-927388-52-1.
- as ed. with Siegfried Jäger, Ina Ruth, Ernst Schulte-Holtey and Frank Wichert: Biomacht und Medien. Ways into the bio-society. 1997, ISBN 3-927388-59-9.
- as ed. with Gabriele Cleve and Ina Ruth: Schlank und (k)rank. Slim body - slim society. 1998, ISBN 3-927388-62-9.
- with Gabriele Cleve, Ina Ruth and Siegfried Jäger: Von deutschen Einzeltätern und ausländischen Banden. Media and criminal offenses. 1998, ISBN 3-927388-65-3.
- as ed. with Heiko Kauffmann: Leben unter Vorbehalt. Institutional racism in Germany. 2002, ISBN 3-927388-83-1.
- with Siegfried Jäger: Die Nahost-Berichterstattung zur Zweiten Intifada in deutschen Printmedien, in: Siegfried Jäger / Franz Januschek (Eds.): Perceived History and Struggles for Identity. Edition DISS, 2004, ISBN 3-89771-730-1.
- Violence against women - through language? Lecture manuscript 2006.
- with Siegfried Jäger: Deutungskämpfe. Theorie und Praxis Kritischer Diskursanalyse. VS Verlag, Wiesbaden 2007, ISBN 978-3-531-15072-7.
