= Meredith Yeager =

American geneticist

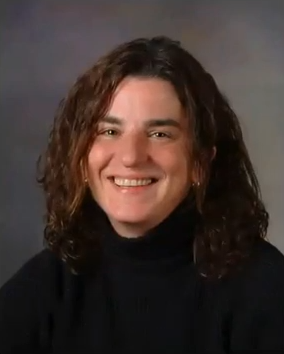
- Born: Stella Meredith Yeager
- Education: Radford University; Hood College; Pennsylvania State University
- Scientific career
- Fields: Cancer genomics
- Workplaces: National Cancer Institute; Hood College

Stella Meredith Yeager is an American geneticist who specializes in cancer genomics. She was the scientific director of the cancer genomics research laboratory at the National Cancer Institute. Yeager is an assistant professor of biology at Hood College.

== Life ==
Yeager completed a B.S. at Radford University. She earned an M.S. at Hood College. She completed a Ph.D. at the Pennsylvania State University. Her 1998 dissertation was titled, Peptide binding function and MHC evolution.

At its founding in 2001, Yeager was part of the scientific and operations management team of Core Genotyping Facility at the National Cancer Institute (NCI). The team included director Stephen Chanock, deputy director Robert A. Welch, and director of operations Amy A. Hutchinson. By 2015, Yeager was the scientific director of the NCI cancer genomics research laboratory. In 2018, she was part of the HPV genomics team awarded a NCI director award for innovative development of novel HPV assays.

In 2019, Yeager presented an overview of genetic and genomic laboratory tools and approaches as part of the NCI radiation epidemiology and dosimetry course. In 2020, Yeager, in the Cancer Genomics Research Laboratory at the National Cancer Institute, conducted a genetic study to determine how different African groups contributed to the genetic structure of Caribbean, as well as, North, Central, and South American populations.

Yeager is a member of the graduate faculty at Hood College. She is an assistant professor of biology and program director of biomedical science.
