= Nicolai Henrich Jæger =

Norwegian lawyer and philologist

Nicolai Henrich Jæger (28 January 1780 – 13 July 1846) was a Norwegian lawyer and philologist.
