= Yaeger =

Yaeger is a surname, an Americanized form of Jäger. Notable people with the surname include:

- Bradley Yaeger (born 1985), Canadian ice dancer
- Edgar Yaeger (1904–1997), American modernist painter from Detroit, Michigan
- Gordon Yaeger who piloted the Bell Rocket Belt at the 1964 New York World Fair and in the James Bond movie Thunderball
- Larry Yaeger (1950), former Apple Distinguished Scientist, currently Full Professor of Informatics at Indiana University Bloomington
- Lynn Yaeger, former fashion reporter for The Village Voice, having worked for the paper for 30 years
- Morgan Yaeger (born 1998), Australian women's basketball player

== See also ==
- Hanna Gillian Kristina Jäger (born 1998), known professionally as Yaeger (singer), Swedish singer
- Lake Lou Yaeger, 1,300-acre (530 ha) reservoir located in Montgomery County, Illinois
- Yaeger Lake, a lake in Minnesota
