= Michael Jäger (artist) =

German artist (born 1956)

Michael Jäger (born 1956 in Düsseldorf) is a German artist. He lives and works in Cologne.
