= Gerrit de Jager =

Dutch cartoonist

The Bierecos in a typical pose. Caption reads "Redekorating? Resprai Kar? Biereco Prereconstructions"

Gerrit de Jager (born 1954, Amsterdam) is a Dutch cartoonist, and the creator of series including De familie Doorzon, Liefde en geluk, Zusje and Roel en zijn Beestenboel.

== Career ==
De Jager's career started in the early 1980s with Wim Stevenhagen under the pseudonym Prutspruts ("fiddle-fiddle"), later changed to Prutswerk ("lousy job"). In the early stages he worked with Fay Lovsky. The first comic they released, entitled De Ironische Man ("The Ironic Man") was not very successful, but the duo went on producing comics such as Bert J. Prulleman and Pruts Pruts, Privat Kreye for the alternative magazine De Vrije Balloen. During this time, the Familie Doorzon also appeared for the first time.

In 1984 Lovsky and de Jager broke up, and de Jager continued the familie Doorzon series, a satire of Dutch society and family life which eventually became one of the most popular cartoons in the Netherlands.

De Jager released an autobiographical novel, Door Zonder Familie, in 2011.

== Sources ==
- Nederlandse Stripgeschiedenis (in Dutch)
- Ibid. (in Dutch)
- Comiclopedia (in English)
