= Yeager =

Yeager is a mostly American surname, a phonetic transcription of the common German surname Jaeger (Jäger), meaning hunter.

Notable people with the surname include:

- Albert F. Yeager (1892–1961) American horticulturalist
- Biff Yeager (born 1942), American actor
- Bunny Yeager (1929–2014), American photographer and model
- Chuck Yeager (1923–2020), American test pilot who was the first person to break the sound barrier
- Dan Yeager (born 1965), American actor, screenwriter, and director
- George Yeager (1874–1940), American baseball player
- James J. Yeager (1909–1971), American football player and coach
- Jeana Yeager (born 1952), American aviator
- Joe Yeager (1875–1937), American baseball player
- Justin Yeager (born 1998), American baseball player
- Ken Yeager (born 1952), American politician
- Laura Yeager, American Army general
- Leland Yeager (1924–2018), American economist
- Lewis Yeager (1878–1906), American football coach
- Meredith Yeager, American geneticist
- Mike Yeager (born 1977), American football coach
- Ralph Oscar Yeager (1892–1960), German-American architect
- Roy Yeager (born 1949), American musician
- Stephanie Yeager, American politician
- Steve Yeager (born 1948), American major league baseball catcher
- Steve Yeager (filmmaker) (born 1948), American film director
- William Yeager (born 1940), best known for his development of the first multiple-protocol router software while working at Stanford University

== Fictional characters ==
- Eren Yeager, main character of the manga and anime Attack on Titan, also spelled Jaeger in some translations
- Zeke Yeager, Eldian Marleyan War Chief from Attack on Titan
- Cade and Tessa Yeager, characters from Transformers: Age of Extinction
- Charlotte E. Yeager, character from the anime Strike Witches, based on Chuck Yeager as her ace archetype

== See also ==
- Jagger (disambiguation)
