= David Divine =

South African-born author and journalist (1904–1987)

David Divine CBE, DSM
- Born: Arthur Durham Divine; 27 July 1904; Cape Town, South Africa
- Died: 1987 (aged 82–83); Hampstead, London, England
- Other name: David Rame
- Education: Rondebosch Boys' High School; Kingswood College, Grahamstown
- Occupations: Author and journalist
- Spouse: Elizabeth Ann MacAlister (m. 1931)

Arthur Durham (David) Divine, CBE, DSM, (27 July 1904 –1987) was a prolific South African writer of books on a variety of subjects but will be chiefly remembered for two controversial books on defence issues, The Blunted Sword (1964) and The Broken Wing (1966). Divine had been a war correspondent and after the Second World War became the defence correspondent of the British Sunday Times, a post he held until 1975.

== Early career ==
Born in Cape Town, South Africa, on 27 July 1904, the son of Arthur Henry Divine and his wife, Mabel Frances Durham, he was educated at Rondebosch Boys' High School and Kingswood College, Grahamstown.

He was employed as a journalist on the Cape Times between 1922 and 1926 and again between 1931 and 1935.

In 1930, he commenced his career as an author of adventure stories, thrillers, military politics and history books. Some were written under the pen name "David Rame". His first novel as Rame was Wine of Good Hope (1939).

== World War II ==
=== Dunkirk ===
During the evacuation of the British Expeditionary Force (BEF) from Dunkirk in 1940 (Operation Dynamo), Divine crossed the English Channel three times in a 35-foot boat to rescue trapped British soldiers. During the last of these he received a stomach wound. For his efforts, Divine was awarded the Distinguished Service Medal (DSM). The following year he published a novel based on his experience at Dunkirk, The Sun Shall Greet Them: A novel based on the Author's experience of the English evacuation at Dunkirk, WW II (1941). Divine would write the screenplay for the feature film Dunkirk (1958) and was the likely inspiration for central character Charles Foreman (Bernard Lee), skipper of the motorboat Vanity. Like Divine, he is wounded during the operation but Foreman dies from his wounds. Nine Days at Dunkirk was a factual account of the operation first published in 1945. In this, he exposed the legend that the evacuation was carried out by the spontaneous and uncoordinated actions of the little ships when in fact they had been carried out as "part of a highly organised movement" by the Admiralty. He was also highly critical of General Alan Brooke's (later Lord Alanbrooke) actions preceding the operation but very sympathetic to Lord Gort, commander of the BEF.

=== Other theatres ===
As one of only three war correspondents allowed to travel with the Royal Navy, Divine reported on the war situation in the Mediterranean and in the Atlantic. To be selected as a correspondent aboard a British warship at this time was a considerable achievement in itself as the Royal Navy was suspicious of journalists and refused to allow any aboard at the beginning of the war. Many of his observations were incorporated into Destroyers’ War: A Million Miles by the Eighth Flotilla (1942). He was also present during Operation Torch – the American landings in North Africa in 1942, and travelled over the Atlas Mountains with the first US troops to fight the German army in the Second World War. At D-Day (Operation Overlord) he accompanied the first flotilla of tank landing craft. The final phase of the war was spent with the American Pacific Fleet in the last battles against Japan. Despite his work as a correspondent he still found time to write The Sun Shall Greet Them, (1941), Tunnel from Calais (1943), and Road to Tunis, (1944). After the war, he received the Order of the British Empire (OBE) in recognition of his service during the conflict.

== Criticism of British defence ==
Working for the Sunday Times foreign news service under former naval intelligence officer (and later creator of James Bond), Ian Fleming, Divine travelled widely. He claimed to be the only journalist to charge expenses for an aeroplane and a camel on the same claim form. As newspapers published longer articles and features, Divine made his reputation as the Sunday Times defence correspondent, where he wrote extensively about Britain's defences in the age of the nuclear missile. He subjected Britain's defence establishment to withering fire in The Blunted Sword (1964) for a lack of imagination and for missing countless opportunities since the Royal Navy began its transition from sail to steam. He was particularly critical of the services' "fortress mentality" in fiercely defending their individual vested interests. Divine recommended maximum decentralisation to the commands and a return of the function of weapons production to industry, to competitive development and to new ideas untrammelled by bureaucracy and tradition. This was contrary to the government's efforts to push British aircraft firms and other defence industries into a succession of mergers that would finally become British Aerospace plc and to create a unified Ministry of Defence (MOD). The MOD, he argued, would not resolve the problems of inter-service rivalry as they would merely "fight in different ways for their separate powers". A naval reviewer acknowledged Divine's painstaking factual accuracy but accused him of seeing only one side of the question and failing to properly appreciate the difficulties faced in the past. Criticism of Divine on the grounds of his lack of objectivity would be unfair, claimed a Times reviewer, pointing out that his preface made clear it was an attack upon the service administration rather than the services themselves. It was not the sort of book to draw much praise from scholarly historians but was nevertheless "effective" with "something of value to say about Britain's power to influence the policies of the west".

Divine produced a wider ranging attack on the air force establishment from World War I up to the mid-1960s in The Broken Wing (1966). He claimed that all three of the British armed services were slow to appreciate the missile's potential despite the damage inflicted to Britain by Germany's V1 cruise missiles and V2 rockets toward the end of the Second World War. He criticized the RAF for clinging to the crewed bomber when the United States was relegating the United States Air Force's (USAF) Strategic Air Command's (SAC) bomber force to a subsidiary role. This was because the Soviet air defences had demonstrated their effectiveness against crewed aircraft by shooting down the high-altitude Lockheed U-2 spy-plane piloted by Gary Powers with a surface-to-air guided missile. The US then unintentionally frustrated the British bomber lobby's plans by cancelling its GAM-87 Skybolt project–a planned stand-off missile that had just been ordered for the V bomber fleet. The US then concentrated on the development of Inter-Continental Ballistic Missiles (ICBMs). Improvements in Soviet Intermediate Range (IRBM) and stand-off missiles also indicated that Britain was defenceless against a missile strike during the mid-1960s, because a potential counter-strike against the Soviet Union with sub-sonic V bombers seemed doomed to failure given the improvements to the Soviet air defences and the fact that the V bomber bases were themselves vulnerable to IRBM's and stand-off missilery. The attempt to prolong the life of the V bomber force by converting the aircraft from high level to low level attack and using a stop-gap stand-off missile was also seen as futile owing to the advances made in the field of Soviet non-radar low-level air defence and the inherent limitations of British equipment originally designed for use at high altitudes. "Britain stood naked in a missile-armed world", he wrote.

== Family ==
In 1931, Arthur Durham Divine married Lady Elizabeth Ann MacAlister, daughter of Sir George Ian MacAlister, Secretary of the Royal Institute of British Architects. The couple lived in Hampstead, London, NW3. Divine died at 24 Keats Grove, Hampstead, in 1987, and Elizabeth died in 1997.

== Other writings ==
But Divine also wrote on a wide array of subjects. The North-West Frontier of Rome re-told the story of Hadrian's Wall, and a children's book The Three Red Flares (1970) may have been the first book produced that used computer technology for mass-publishing. Boy on a Dolphin (1955), set in Greece, would become a major 20th Century Fox film starring Sophia Loren and Alan Ladd. The book tells the romantic story of Phaedra, an island sponge-diver who discovers an ancient statue of a boy riding upon a dolphin. The statue then becomes the object of a struggle between an archaeologist (Ladd) who wants Phaedra (Loren) to sell it to the Greek authorities and a millionaire who desires it for his private collection. By coincidence, two years after the novel was released, a 16" bronze statuette of the goddess Artemis removing an arrow from her quiver was found near Delos, Divine's original setting. The figure probably dated from pre-Roman Hellenic times.

== Select bibliography ==
- The Key of England (London: Macdonald, 1968)
- The Stolen Seasons

== Legacy ==
Divine wrote more than 21 books. His writing on defence issues was a notable influence on Wing Cmdr Hubert Allen's controversial books and articles on British airpower, especially Who Won the Battle of Britain and The Legacy of Lord Trenchard. Allen claimed that Divine was the "notable exception" to the Fleet Street defence correspondents, who "almost to a man" swallowed the notion of the V bomber's low-level capability. He died on 30 April 1987 in the United Kingdom.

== Sources ==
- H. R. Allen, The Legacy of Lord Trenchard (Cassell, 1972). ISBN 0 304 93702 9
- D. Divine, The Blunted Sword (Hutchinson,1964) OCLC 2699204
- D. Divine, The Broken Wing: A Study in the British Exercise of Air Power (Hutchinson, 1966). ISBN B 0 000 CMZN 0.
- P. Knightley, The First Casualty is Truth: The War Correspondent as Hero and Myth-Maker from the Crimea to Kosovo (Prion Books, 2001). ISBN 978-1853753763
- "In Which They Served." Times [London, England], 16 April 1959: 15. The Times Digital Archive. Web.
- OUR CORRESPONDENT. "American Film Made in Greece." Times [London, England], 27 November 1956: 3. The Times Digital Archive. Web. 7 April 2014.
- OUR CORRESPONDENT. "Fishermen Find Greek Bronze". Times [London, England], 1 June 1959: 7. The Times Digital Archive. Web. 7 April 2014.
- 'RH', "Review of The Blunted Sword", The Naval Review, Vol. LII, No. 3, 31 July 1964.
- "Warriors in Whitehall". Times [London, England] 19 March 1964: p. 17. The Times Digital Archive. Web. 7 April 2014.
- Mr David Divine, Obituary, The Times, 2 May 1987, p. 72.
