= Marike Jager =

Dutch musician (born 1979)

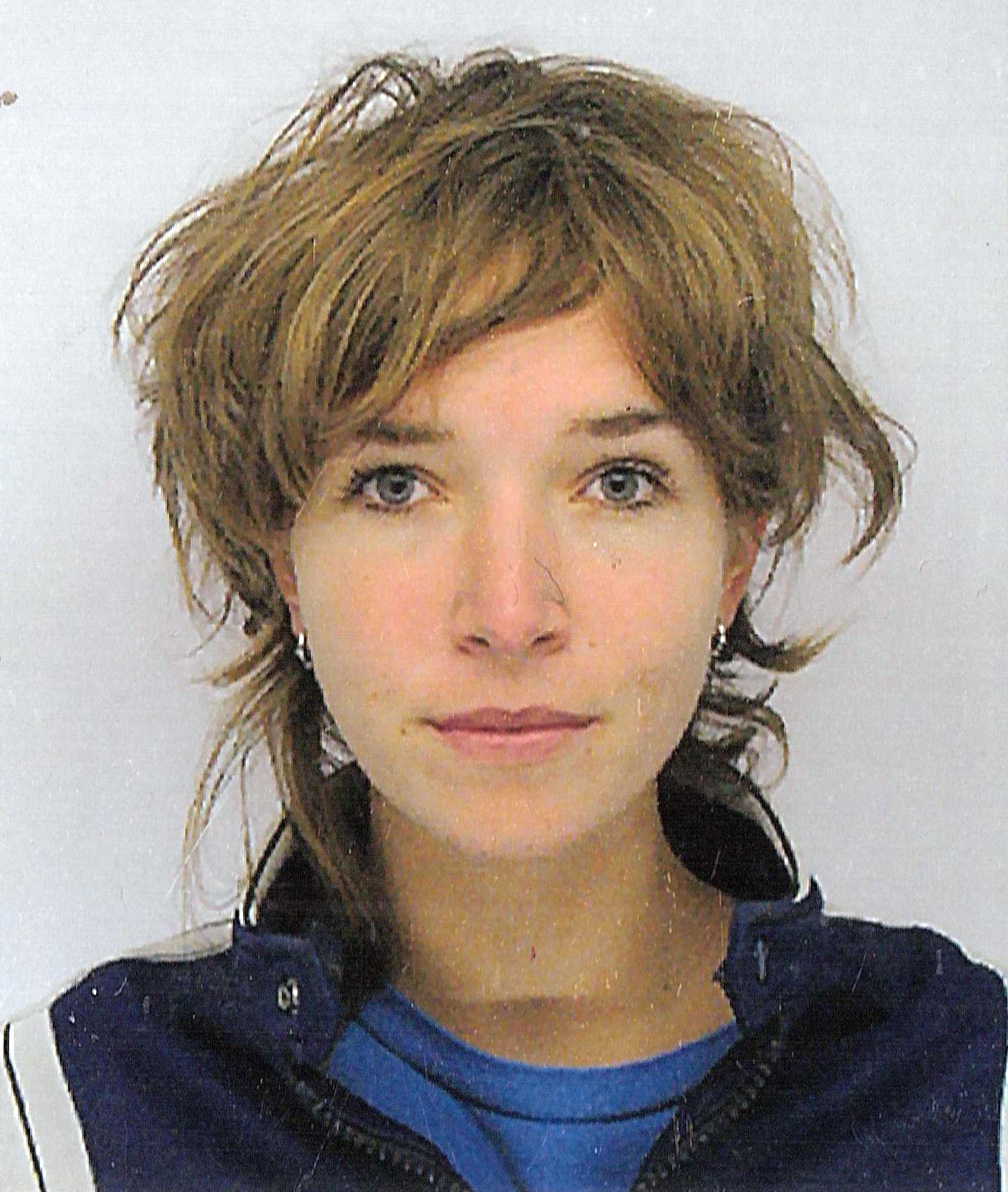
- Jager in 2010

Background information
- Born: 4 February 1979 (age 47)
- Origin: Amersfoort, Netherlands
- Genres: Pop
- Occupation: Musician
- Instruments: Vocals; guitar; piano
- Label: Morning Coffee Records
- Website: marikejager.com

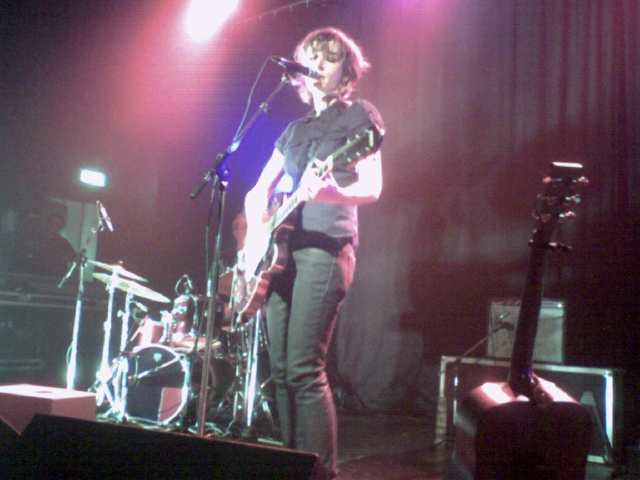
Marike Jager performing at Tivoli de Helling, Utrecht, in 2007

Marike Jager (born 4 February 1979 in Amersfoort) is a Dutch singer-songwriter, guitarist and television presenter.

She grew up in Leusden and learned to play the guitar while backpacking through Australia, New Zealand, Asia and South Africa. There she wrote her first song 'Lizzy'. When she got back in the Netherlands she went to the stages, quickly winning the 'Studenten Songfestival in Maastricht (songfestival for students in Maastricht). Soon after she also won the Sky Radio Talentenjacht (Sky Radio Talenthunt), the demopoll by the Brussels Studio and the prestigious 'Grote Prijs van Nederland' 2003 (Grand Prix of the Netherlands) in the category singer-songwriter. After winning the Grote Prijs, she meets Henk Jan Heuvelink. He plays the wurlitzer, harmonium and the piano. Together they regularly play at festivals, in theaters and on the radio. In 2008 drummer Nicky Hustinx joins the band.

== Career ==
=== The Beauty Around (2006) ===
In 2005, Jager recorded her first album, The Beauty Around. It was released on 15 May 2006, on her own record label, Morning Coffee Records. It is distributed by V2Records. The debut lives up to everyone's expectations. Marike is awarded the Essent Award for young musical talent, and the album spends many weeks in the charts. She supports the Canadian artist Feist when on tour in the Netherlands. Feist leaves her a personal message: 'It was very inspiring to share the stage with you.'

=== Celia Trigger (2008) ===
In 2008, after the band has been joined by drummer Nicky Hustinx, the band released its second album, Celia Trigger, which received good reviews and was nominated for the Dutch Edison Awards in two categories: best female artist and best album.

A recording of a concert in Nijmegen, part of the band's first theater tour, is released on a DVD in 2010. The Magic Live Box contains the DVD, a cd containing a selection of the songs, and a bonus CD containing piano versions of some of the songs, played by Henk Jan Heuvelink.

=== Here Comes the Night (2011) ===
The recordings for Jager's third album were done by engineer Staf Verbeeck in the Jet Studio, the oldest studio in Belgium and a musical monument where both Edith Piaf and The Rolling Stones have recorded. Soundwise she chooses a new path. Here comes the night was mixed by multiple Grammy Award winner Tchad Blake, an idiosyncratic producer who has worked with such artists as The Black Keys, Tom Waits, Elvis Costello, Ron Sexsmith, and Suzanne Vega. The album is very distinctive, with cinematic underpinnings. In September 2011, Marike was again nominated for two Edisons: 'Best Album' and 'Best Female Artist'.

== Discography ==
- The Beauty Around (2006)
- Celia Trigger (2008)
- The Magic Live Box (live DVD, 2010)
- Here Comes the Night (2011)
- The Silent Song (2014)
- Hey Are You OK (2019)
