= Yaeger Lake =

Lake in Minnesota, United States

- Location within Minnesota
- Location: Wadena County, Minnesota
- Coordinates: 46°42′13″N 94°58′15″W
- Type: lake

Yaeger Lake is a lake in Wadena County, in the U.S. state of Minnesota.

Yaeger Lake was named for an early settler.

== See also ==
- List of lakes in Minnesota
