= Jágr (surname) =

Jágr is a Czech-language surname. It is related to the German surname Jäger which means "hunter" in German.

Notable people with the surname include:

- Jaromír Jágr, a Czech ice hockey winger
- Jaroslav Jágr, a Czech ice hockey goaltender
- Martin Jágr, a Czech rugby player
- Miloslav Jágr, a Czech painter
