= Jaggard =

Jaggard is a surname, and may refer to:

- Charles Jaggard (born 1973), English cricketer
- Edwin Jaggard (born 1942), Australian academic
- Edwin A. Jaggard (1859–1911), American jurist
- William Jaggard (circa 1568 – 1623), English printer
- Harry Jaggard (born 1996), English YouTuber

== See also ==
- Michelle Jaggard-Lai (born 1969), a retired Australian tennis player
- Jagger
