= Carl Panzram =

American serial killer and rapist (1891–1930)

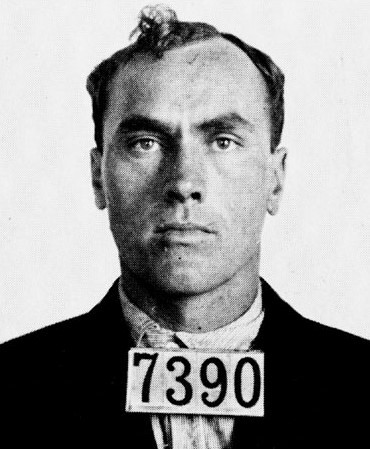
- Mugshot of Panzram in 1915
- Born: Charles Panzram; June 28, 1891 near East Grand Forks, Minnesota, U.S.
- Died: September 5, 1930 (aged 39); USP Leavenworth, Kansas, U.S.
- Other names: Jefferson Baldwin; Cooper John II; Harry Panzram; Jack Allen; Jefferson Davis; Jefferson Rhodes; John King; John O'Leary; John Ape; Teddy Bedard
- Years active: 1899; 1903–1930
- Notable work: Killer: A Journal of Murder
- Status: Executed by hanging
- Motive: Misanthropy; Rage Robbery Rape Sadism
- Convictions: First degree murder countless burglaries, larcenies, robberies, assaults, and escapes Sodomy
- Penalty: Death by hanging

Details
- Locations: United States: Minnesota; Montana; Kansas; California; Texas; Oregon; Idaho; New York; Washington, D.C.; Rhode Island; Connecticut; Maryland; Philadelphia; Portuguese Angola: Luanda Province
- Killed: 5 confirmed 21 confessed 100+ suspected
- Imprisoned at: ≈100 jails Seven prisons: Clinton Correctional Facility; Leavenworth Federal Prison; (US Disciplinary Barracks); United States Penitentiary, Leavenworth; Minnesota State Prison; Montana State Prison; Oregon State Prison; Sing Sing Correctional Facility

Charles "Carl" Panzram (June 28, 1891 – September 5, 1930) was an American rapist, serial killer, and habitual offender. In prison confessions and in his autobiography, Panzram confessed to having murdered twenty-one boys and men, only five of which could be corroborated. He is suspected of having killed more than a hundred boys and men in the United States alone, and several more in Portuguese Angola.

Panzram also confessed to having committed more than a thousand acts of rape against males of all ages. After a lifetime of crime, during which he served many prison terms and escaped from many prisons, Panzram was executed by hanging in 1930 for the murder of a prison employee at the United States Penitentiary in Leavenworth, Kansas.

== Early life ==
Carl Panzram was born on June 28, 1891, on a farm near East Grand Forks, Minnesota, the sixth of seven children born to East Prussian immigrants Johann "John" Gottlieb Panzram, and Mathilda Elizabeth "Lizzie" Panzram (née Bolduan).

Panzram later reflected on his early childhood with the sentiment that he was not liked by other children. By the age of five he claimed that he was a liar and thief, and recalled that he became meaner the older he grew. Panzram's father abandoned the family when he was seven years old. Around the same time, Panzram developed an infection in the mastoid process of his temporal bone, which forced him to undergo surgery, which was performed at home and only worsened the infection, so he was later taken to the hospital for further surgery.

It is unknown whether he suffered brain damage as a result of the incident. Eventually, four of his five older brothers left as well. One of them, his older stepbrother Louis Price, drowned in May 1905 while working as a lumberjack.

=== Early criminal record ===
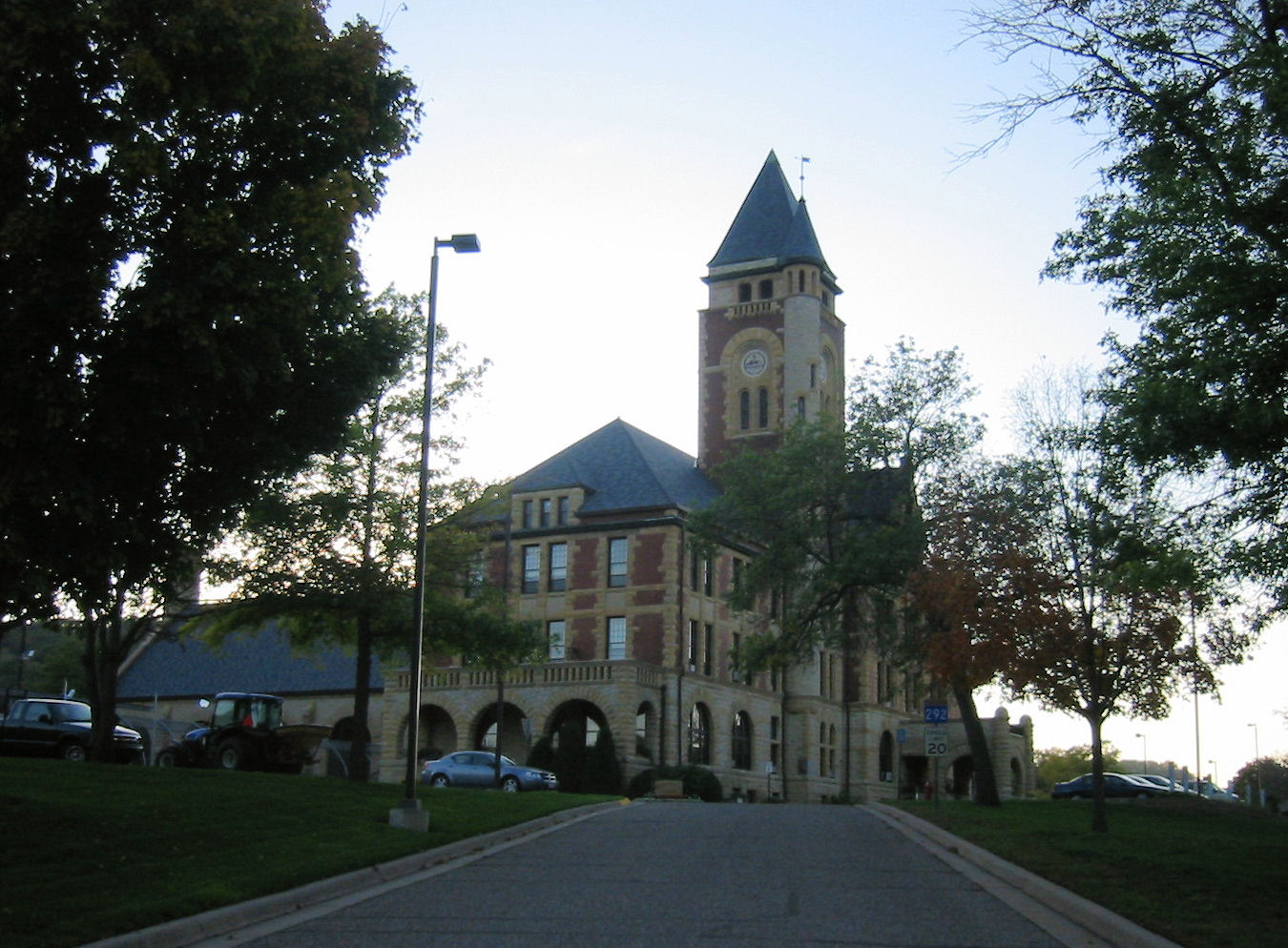
Minnesota Correctional Facility – Red Wing, where Panzram was incarcerated from 1903 to 1906

Panzram's run-ins with the law started in 1899, at age 8, when he was charged in juvenile court with being drunk and disorderly. In 1903, at age 12, he was arrested and jailed for being drunk and "incorrigible". Not long after this second arrest, Panzram stole cake, apples and a revolver from a neighbor's home.

In October 1903, Panzram's mother sent him to the Minnesota State Training School, purportedly a reform school. Panzram later wrote in his autobiography that he was repeatedly beaten, tortured and raped by staff members, in a workshop the children dubbed "the paint shop" due to leaving the room "painted" with bruises and blood. Panzram hated the school so much that he decided to burn it down, and did so successfully and without detection on July 7, 1905.

Some accounts claim Panzram killed a 12-year-old boy here. In January 1906, Panzram was paroled from Red Wing Training School, where he had been detained after stealing money from his mother's pocketbook. By his early teens Panzram exhibited alcoholism and had a lengthy criminal record, mostly for burglary and robbery offenses. At age 14, a couple of weeks after his parole and two weeks after attempting to kill a Lutheran cleric with a revolver, (Note: Panzram tried to shoot the teacher; the plot miscarried, and he was thrown out of school.) Panzram ran away from home to live on the streets. He often traveled via train cars, and later recalled having been gang raped by a group of homeless men on one of these occasions.

== Crimes ==
=== Early crimes ===
In the summer of 1906, Panzram was arrested for burglary in Butte, Montana, and sentenced to one year's imprisonment at Montana State Reform School in Miles City. He later claimed that after a guard named Bushart punished him, Panzram assaulted and critically injured him with a wooden board. As punishment, Panzram had to spend some time in solitary confinement. In 1907, Panzram and a safecracker, James Benson, escaped from Montana State Reform School and stole guns in Terry, Montana. In the coming weeks, Panzram and Benson robbed people, houses, and repeatedly broke into stores and burned down buildings, especially churches, in acts of arson in the towns of Glendive, Crane, and Sidney. In Fargo, North Dakota, the two men separated.

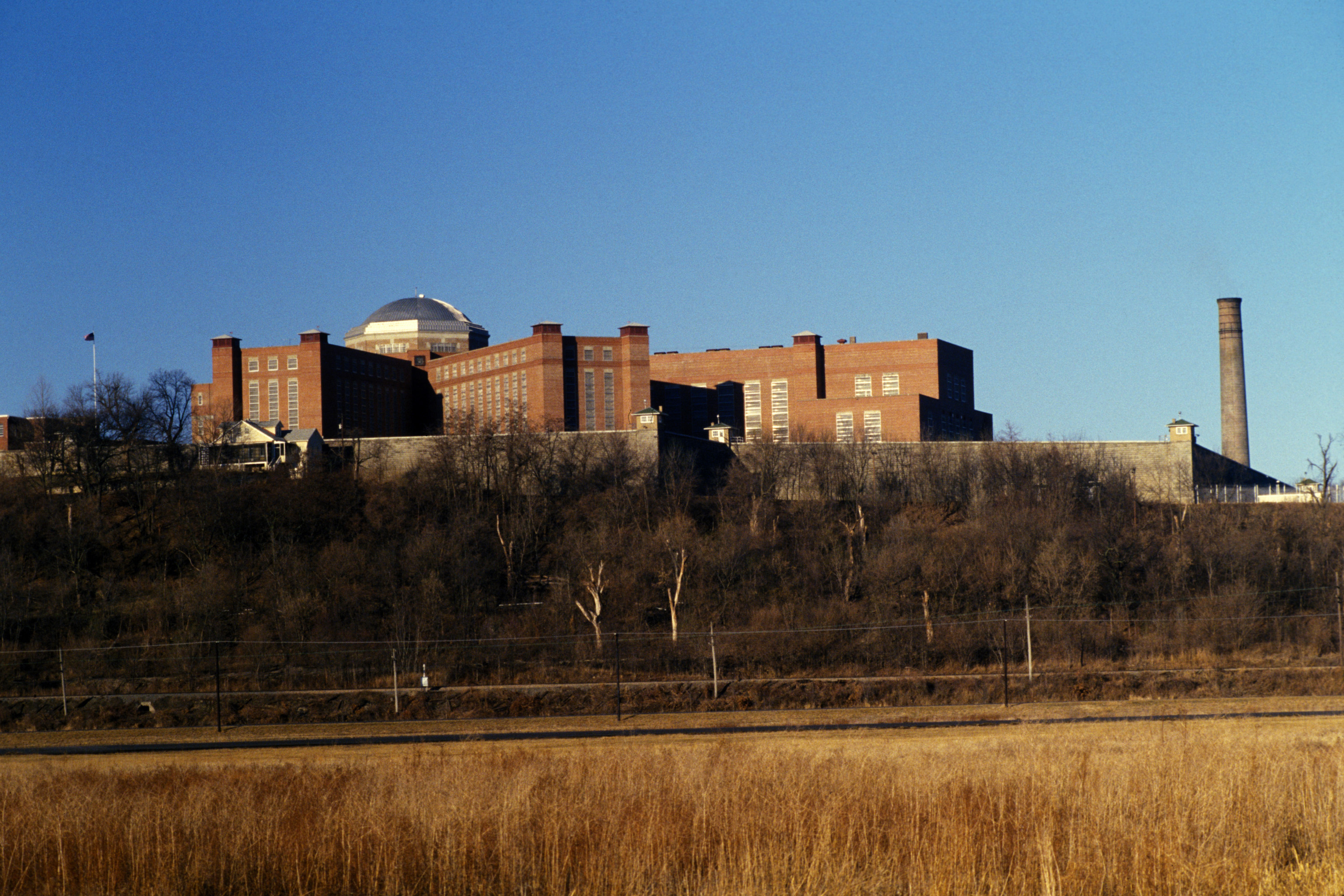
The original 19th-century Fort Leavenworth USDB was dubbed "The Castle" or "Little Top" due to its size and location.

Later in 1907, after getting drunk in a saloon in Helena, Montana, Panzram enlisted in the United States Army and was assigned to the 6th Infantry at Fort William Henry Harrison. Refusing to take orders from officers and being generally insubordinate, he was convicted of larceny for stealing $88.24 worth of supplies. He served a prison sentence at hard labor in the United States Disciplinary Barracks at Fort Leavenworth, Kansas, between 20 April 1908 and August 1910. U.S. Secretary of War William Howard Taft approved Panzram's sentence. Panzram later claimed that while he had been a "rotten yegg" before imprisonment at the military penitentiary, "any shred of goodness left in him was smashed out" during his time at Fort Leavenworth.

After his release and dishonorable discharge, Panzram resumed his criminal activities. Stealing items that ranged from bicycles to yachts, he was caught and imprisoned multiple times. He served prison sentences under his own name and aliases in: Fresno, California; Rusk, Texas; The Dalles, Oregon; Harrison, Idaho; Butte, Montana; Montana State Prison; Oregon State Penitentiary; Bridgeport, Connecticut (as "John O'Leary"); Sing Sing Correctional Facility, New York; Clinton Correctional Facility, New York; Washington, D.C., and Leavenworth, Kansas. While incarcerated, Panzram frequently attacked guards and refused to follow their orders. The guards retaliated, subjecting him to beatings and other punishments.

In his autobiography, Panzram wrote that he was "the spirit of meanness personified" and that he would often rape men whom he had robbed. He was noted for his large stature and great physical strength—due to years of hard labor at Leavenworth and other prisons—which aided him in overpowering most men.

=== Escalating violence ===
Panzram claimed in his autobiography that after escaping from a chain gang at Rusk, Texas, he went to Ciudad Juárez, Mexico in the winter of 1910 to try to enlist in the Federales. After being refused, Panzram met a half-Indian from Oregon who had just been released from prison in Yuma, Arizona; together they took a train to Del Rio, Texas, a small town 425 miles (684 km) east of El Paso. He later claimed to have abducted, assaulted and strangled a man about a mile from the town and then stolen $35 from the victim.

The two men later parted ways and Panzram crossed the border into Mexico again, this time to Agua Prieta, where he joined the Mexican Army's Foreign Legion, known as the Northern Brigade Mexico. During his short service, which lasted about a month, he was disappointed to discover that looting had become widespread throughout the country, and that all the places he visited had been plundered long before. He deserted, stealing weapons and a horse, riding it towards the border until it died of exhaustion. He then began to make his way to California.

In the summer of 1911, going by the alias "Jefferson Davis", Panzram was arrested in Fresno, California, for stealing a bicycle. He was sentenced to six months in county jail, but escaped after thirty days. He claimed that after his escape, while riding on a boxcar in California, he disarmed a man, a "railway detective" or "railway brakeman" and forced him to rape a homeless man at gunpoint before throwing them both off the train. Then he proceeded to Oregon, where he made a living as a logger.

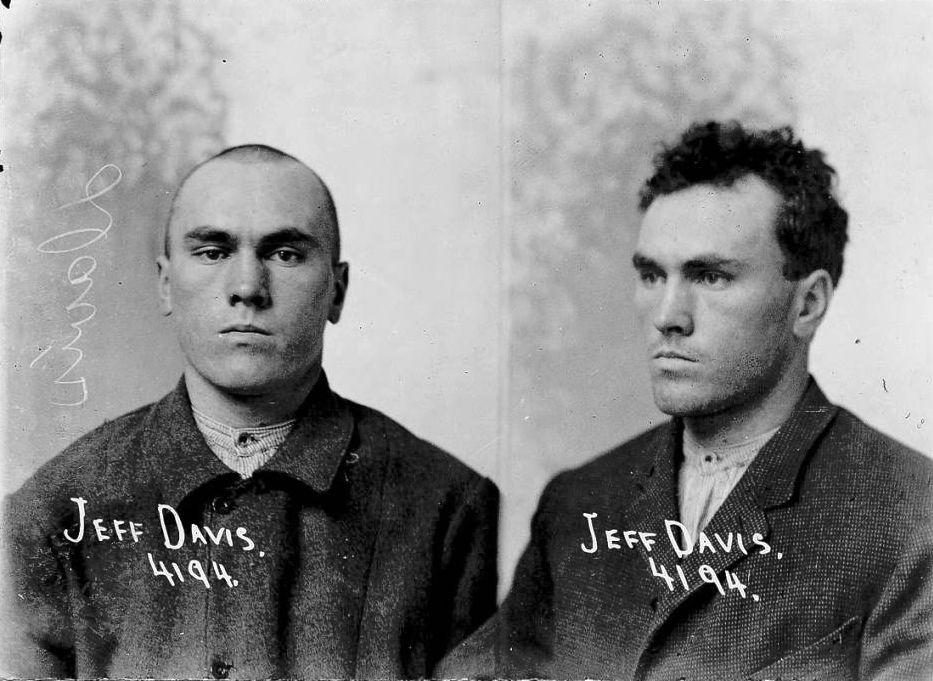
Panzram, under the alias "Jefferson Davis", at Montana State Prison, c. 1913

Panzram admitted years later that once, when hiding in a bordello, his wallet was stolen, and he was infected with gonorrhea. He became paranoid, claiming that the law was always on his trail but could never catch him. In 1913, going by the alias "Jack Allen", he was arrested in The Dalles, Oregon, for highway robbery, assault and sodomy. He broke out of jail after two months. He was arrested again in Harrison, Idaho, under the alias "Jeff Davis", but escaped from county jail.

On April 7, 1913, under the alias "Jeff Davis," Panzram was arrested in Malta, Montana: "A fellow giving his name as Jeff Davis was arrested Monday morning for disorderly conduct and placed in the county jail. During the day information came from Chinook that he was wanted there for breaking into a dentist's office and stealing a lady's fur lined coat and a tube of gold. A Chinook officer came after Jeff Tuesday. The coat in question was sold in Malta for $5.00 and by the way it looks like the party bought $5.00 worth of experience instead of coat." In Chinook, under the alias "Jefferson Davis", he was sentenced to one year in prison for burglary, to be served at the Montana State Prison.

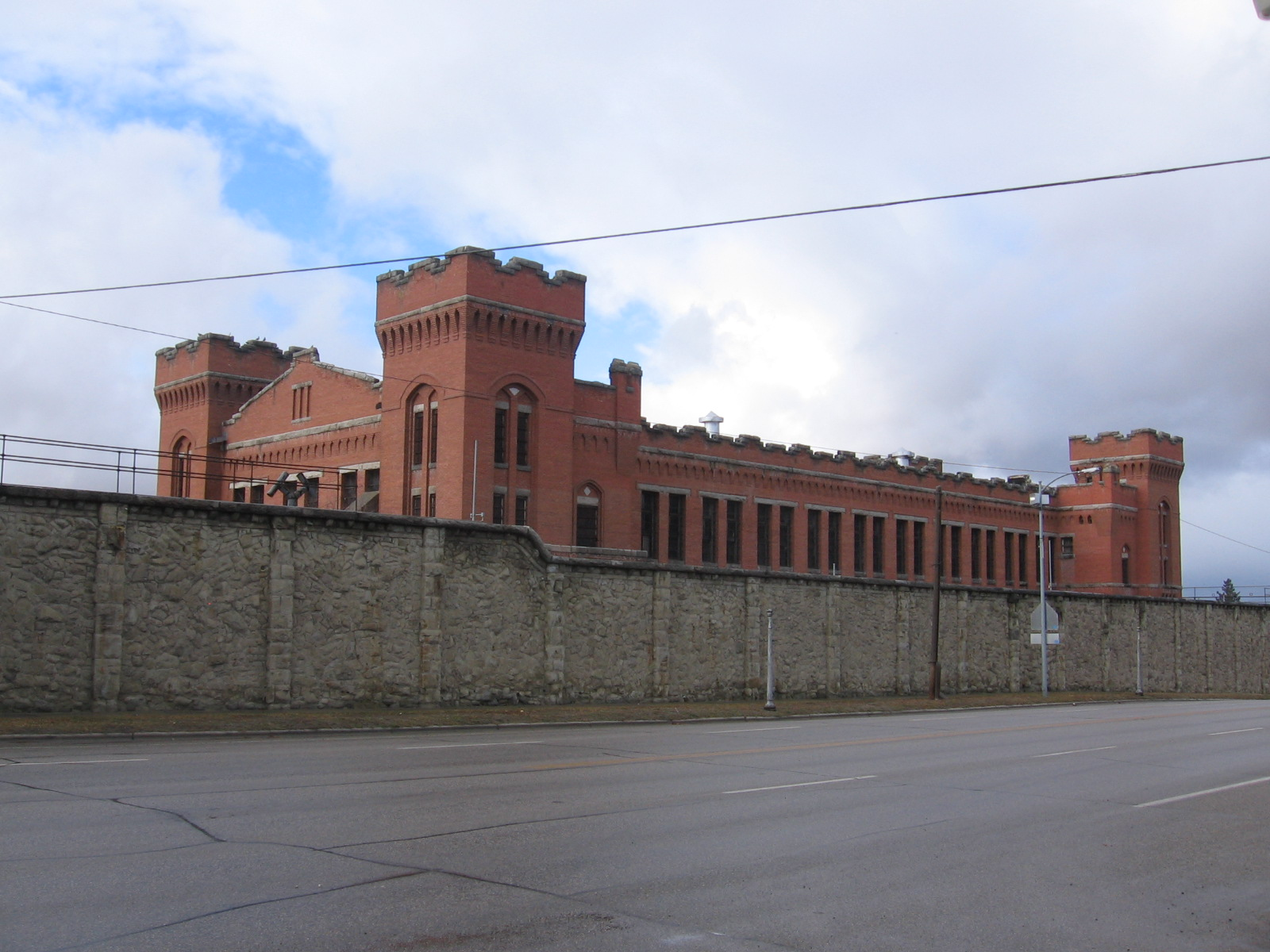
The cell block at Montana State Prison that housed Panzram from 1913 to 1915

On April 27, 1913, Panzram, under his "Jefferson Davis" alias, was admitted to the Montana State Prison at Deer Lodge, Montana with an occupation listed as "waiter and teamster". He met Jimmie Benson and planned an escape; however, Benson was transferred. Panzram escaped on November 13, 1913. "Jeff Davis who was arrested here some time ago for robbing a dentist office in Chinook and sent up to the pen has made good his get-a-way from that institution. He was a trustee and working on road work."

Within a week, he was arrested for burglary in Three Forks, giving his name as "Jeff Rhoades". He was incarcerated at Deer Lodge for an additional year. By his own account he committed sodomy while imprisoned. Panzram was released on March 3, 1915, with a new suit of clothing, $5.00 and a ticket to the next town six miles away. He rode the rails through Washington State, Idaho, Nebraska and South Dakota via the Columbia River. On June 1, he burglarized a house in Astoria, Oregon, where he was soon arrested while attempting to sell some of the stolen items.

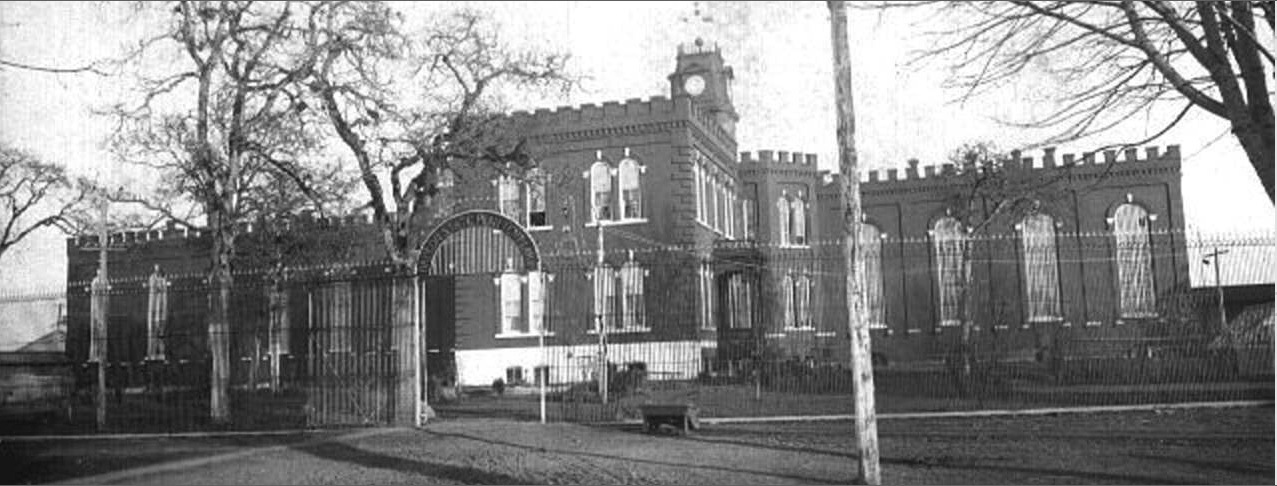
Oregon State Penitentiary in 1892

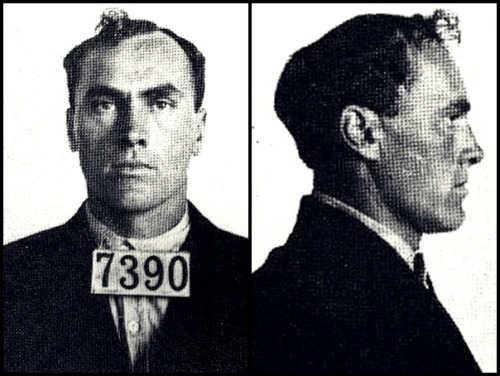
Panzram's 1915 mug shot at the Oregon State Penitentiary

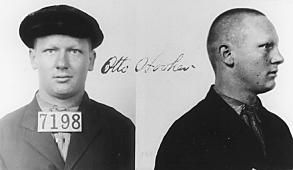
Otto Hooker in 1914

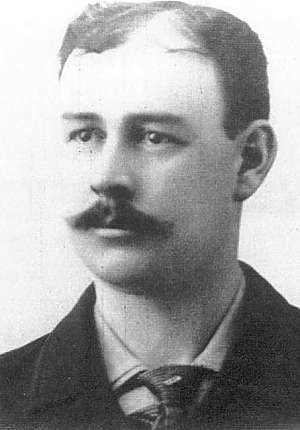
Oregon State Prison Superintendent Harry Minto was killed on September 27, 1915, by Otto Hooker with Panzram's help.

Under the name "Jeff Baldwin", Panzram was sentenced to seven years in prison, to be served at the Oregon State Penitentiary in Salem, where he was taken on June 24, 1915. Fifty-year-old warden Harry Minto believed in harsh treatment of inmates, including beatings and isolation, among other disciplinary measures. Panzram stated that he swore he "would never do that seven years and I defied the warden and all his officers to make me."

Later in 1915, Panzram helped fellow inmate Otto Hooker escape. While attempting to evade recapture, Hooker wounded Jefferson Oregon Town Marshal J. J. Benson and killed Minto on September 27, 1915, with a Benson Pistol. This event marked Panzram's first known involvement in a murder, as an accessory before the fact. Hooker was mortally wounded. In his prison record, which noted his two aliases, "Jefferson Davis" and "Jeff Rhodes", Panzram falsely gave his age as 30, and his place of birth as Alabama. His only truthful statement was when he stated his occupation as "thief".

Panzram was disciplined several times while at Salem, including sixty-one days in solitary confinement, before escaping on September 18, 1917. A reward of $50.00 was offered for his recapture. After two shootouts, in which he attempted to shoot Chief Deputy Sheriff Joseph Frum, Panzram was recaptured and returned to the prison. On May 12, 1918, he escaped again by sawing through the bars of his cell, and caught a freight train heading east.

Panzram began going by the name "John O'Leary" and shaved off his mustache to change his appearance. Panzram would never return to the Pacific Northwest. Now twenty-seven years old and with a bounty on his head in many countries, he first attempted to enlist in the United States Army at Meyersdale, Pennsylvania. He deserted after a few days, finding odd jobs in Sparrows Point, Maryland. A few days later he continued his journey towards Baltimore, where he met a young boy who helped him rob a hotel in Frederick, Maryland, allegedly ending up in New York City.

In New York, he joined labor unions that helped him obtain a seaman's identification card, sailing on the steamship James S. Whitney to Panama. Panzram then tried to steal a small boat with the help of a drunken sailor. They killed everyone on board and the sailor was arrested. Still free, Panzram travelled to Peru to work in a copper mine. He boarded the steamer Homa, which sailed to Port Arthur, Texas, and from there to Glasgow, Scotland.

Upon docking, Panzram attempted to rob the ship, but was captured and briefly imprisoned in HMP Barlinnie. After his release, he continued to Southampton and London, crossing the English Channel to France, visiting Le Havre and Paris. When his money ran out, he joined the crew of a ship sailing to Hamburg, Germany, and stayed in several other ports before returning to the United States.

=== Murder spree ===
In 1920, Panzram committed a robbery in Newport, Rhode Island. After a successful robbery of a jewelry store in Bridgeport, Connecticut, he left with about $1,500 in his pockets and returned to Hamburg, Germany. Destitute of all his fortune two weeks later, he returned to the United States, penniless on the same ship he had arrived on. A few days later he sailed to New Haven, Connecticut, on the Manchuria. On September 16, 1920, he burglarized the William H. Taft Mansion in New Haven, a residence of the former U.S. President. Panzram specifically targeted the mansion out of an animus he had been holding against Taft since his incarceration at Fort Leavenworth. He stole a large amount of jewelry and bonds, (Note: Panzram claimed the jewelry and bonds were worth $40,000. Taft reported that his wife's jewelry was worth only a few thousand dollars.) as well as an inscribed watch for Taft's Philippine service and Taft's Colt M1911 .45 caliber handgun.

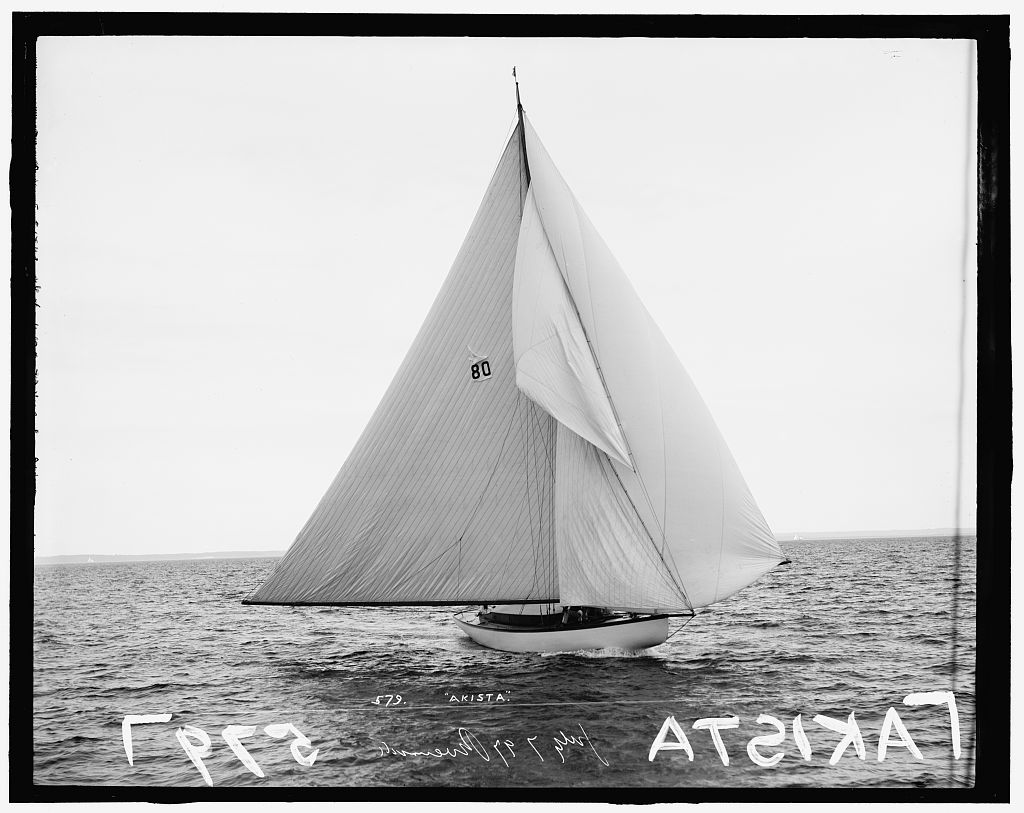
The yacht Akista

Using Taft's stolen money, Panzram bought a small sailing yacht, the Akista, and embarked on an eight-year-long murder spree which spanned several countries and involved multiple victims. Sailing south to New York City, at City Island, Bronx, for three months Panzram lured sailors away from port bars onto the yacht, making them drunk, raping them, and murdering them with Taft's stolen pistol, then dumping their bodies near Execution Rocks Light in Long Island Sound. Panzram later claimed to have killed ten men in this manner. The sailor murders ended only after Akista ran aground and sank near Atlantic City, New Jersey, during which his last two potential victims escaped to parts unknown.

On October 3, 1920, Panzram, aka John O'Leary, captain, along with John Delaney and J. Gilmore had lashed themselves to the yacht's capstan after Akista foundered and turned over on its side on the Brigantien Shoals at Atlantic City NJ, while trying to make shelter in Absecon Inlet. On October 6, 1920, they were rescued by Captain Henry Brown of a fishing smack. O'Leary was in hospital from shock and exposure.

On October 26, Panzram was arrested in Stamford, Connecticut, for burglary and possession of a loaded handgun, a .44 revolver. In 1921, he served six months in jail in Bridgeport, Connecticut. Panzram later claimed after the shipwreck he was cared for by a Dr. Charles McGivern. After serving his Bridgeport CT sentence, Panzram borrowed $100.00 from McGivern. Going to Philadelphia, he took back Taft's .45 pistol, which he had left with McGivern.

After being released, he traveled to Philadelphia, where he was involved in a shootout with police and was arrested on May 16, 1921. Panzram had been involved with Strikers who attacked and injured a seaman. Panzram fired at a boarding house proprierter and Philadelphia Police Detective Harry Walker. Panzram was captured when he ran out of bullets. No one was injured by the gunfire. He was held in $1,000 bail in court.

=== Africa ===
After being convicted of aggravated assault and inciting a riot, Panzram faced a heavy prison sentence, but managed to be released on bail, fleeing to Norfolk, Virginia. He caught a ship to southern Africa and landed in Luanda, the capital of colonial Portuguese Angola. By late 1921, Panzram was foreman of an oil rig in Angola, which he later burned down out of what he said was "spitefulness". Shortly after, he decided to seek out a virgin girl.

Panzram paid a resident Angolan family 80 escudos (US$8) and, in exchange, was given a 12-year-old girl, whom he raped in his shack that night. He returned the girl to her family demanding his money back on suspicion of the girl not being an actual virgin. The family then gave Panzram an 8-year-old girl, who he also raped in his shack, but who was eventually taken back to the family because he suspected that she too was not a virgin. He then raped a local boy who worked as a waiter, arousing the anger of the locals.

Panzram was forced to flee through a rainforest back to the city. Panzram sought the help of the American consul in Luanda, but they flatly refused to help him after hearing from his employer about the many troubles he had caused during his short stay there. Learning that he had been fired from his job, Panzram found his superior and beat him. He then claimed that he raped and killed an Angolan boy, estimated to be eleven or twelve years old.

In his confession to this murder, he wrote: "I sat down to think things over a bit. While I was sitting there, a little kid about eleven or twelve years old came bumming around. He was looking for something. He found it too. I took him out to a gravel pit about one-quarter mile away. I left him there, but first committed sodomy on him and then killed him. His brains were coming out of his ears when I left him, and he will never be any deader.

"Then I went to town, bought a ticket on the Belgian steamer to Lobito Bay down the coast. There I hired a canoe and six niggers and went out hunting in the bay and backwaters. I was looking for crocodiles. I found them, plenty. They were hungry. I fed them. I shot all six of those niggers and dumped 'em in. The crocks done the rest. I stole their canoe and went back to town". As the Taft pistol had been confiscated in Philadelphia, he used a Luger pistol for these murders.

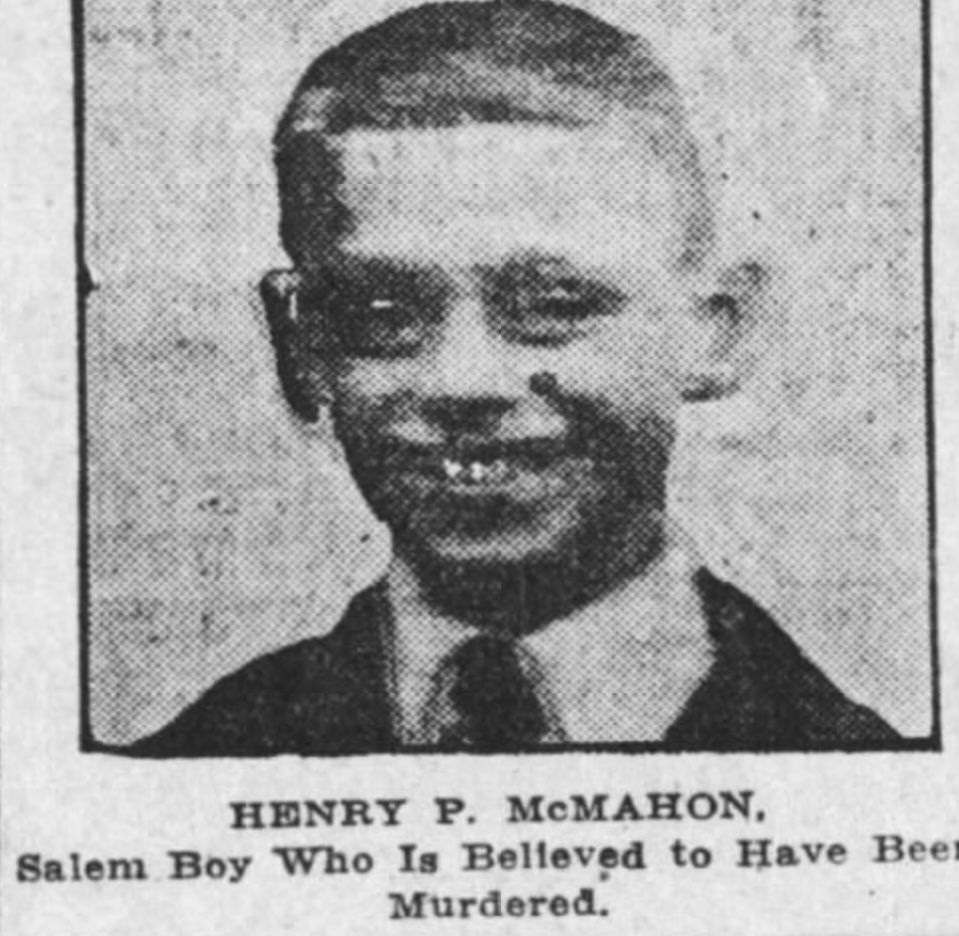
Henry McMahon, a murder victim of Panzram

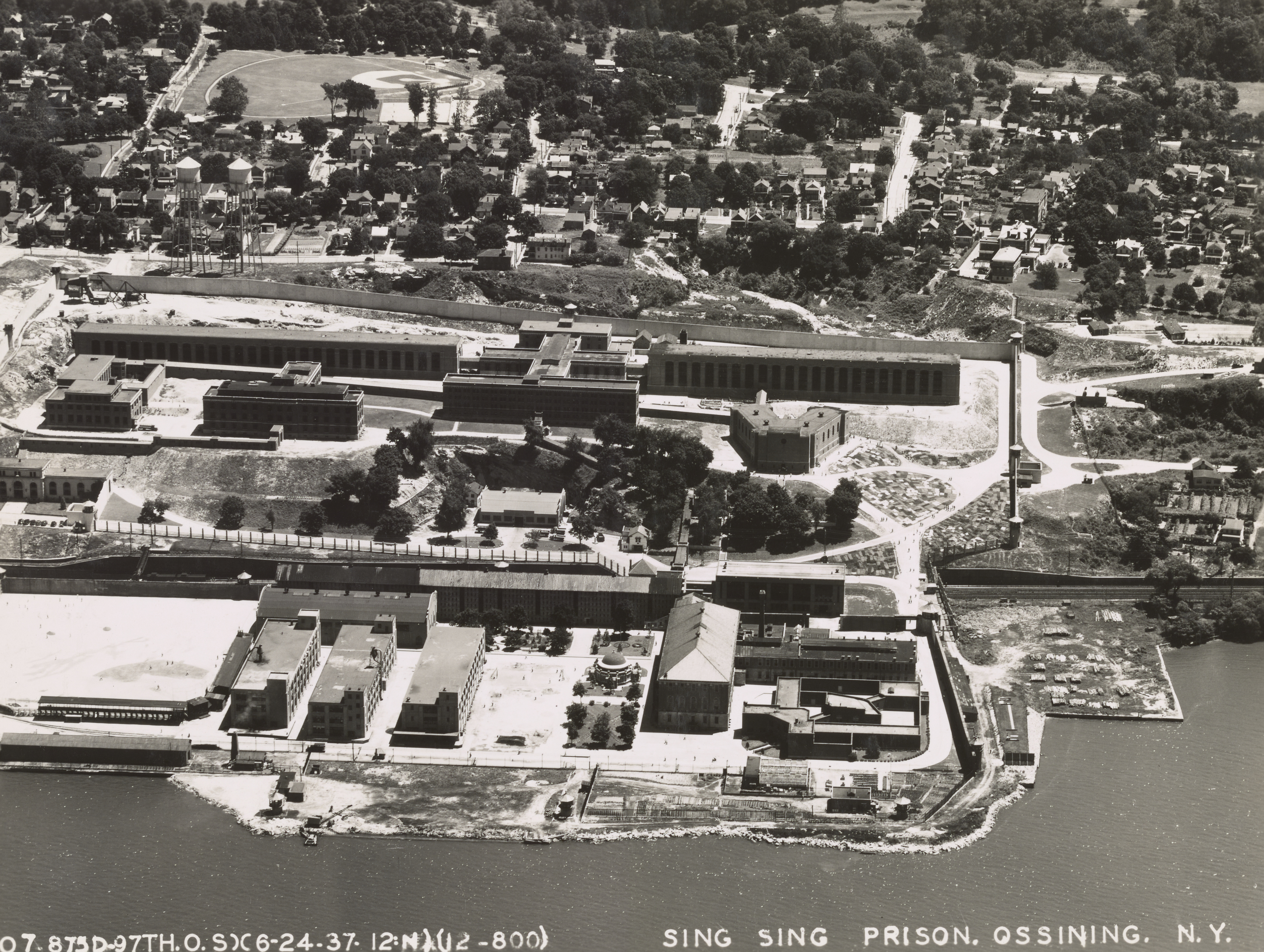
An aerial view of Sing Sing, 1937

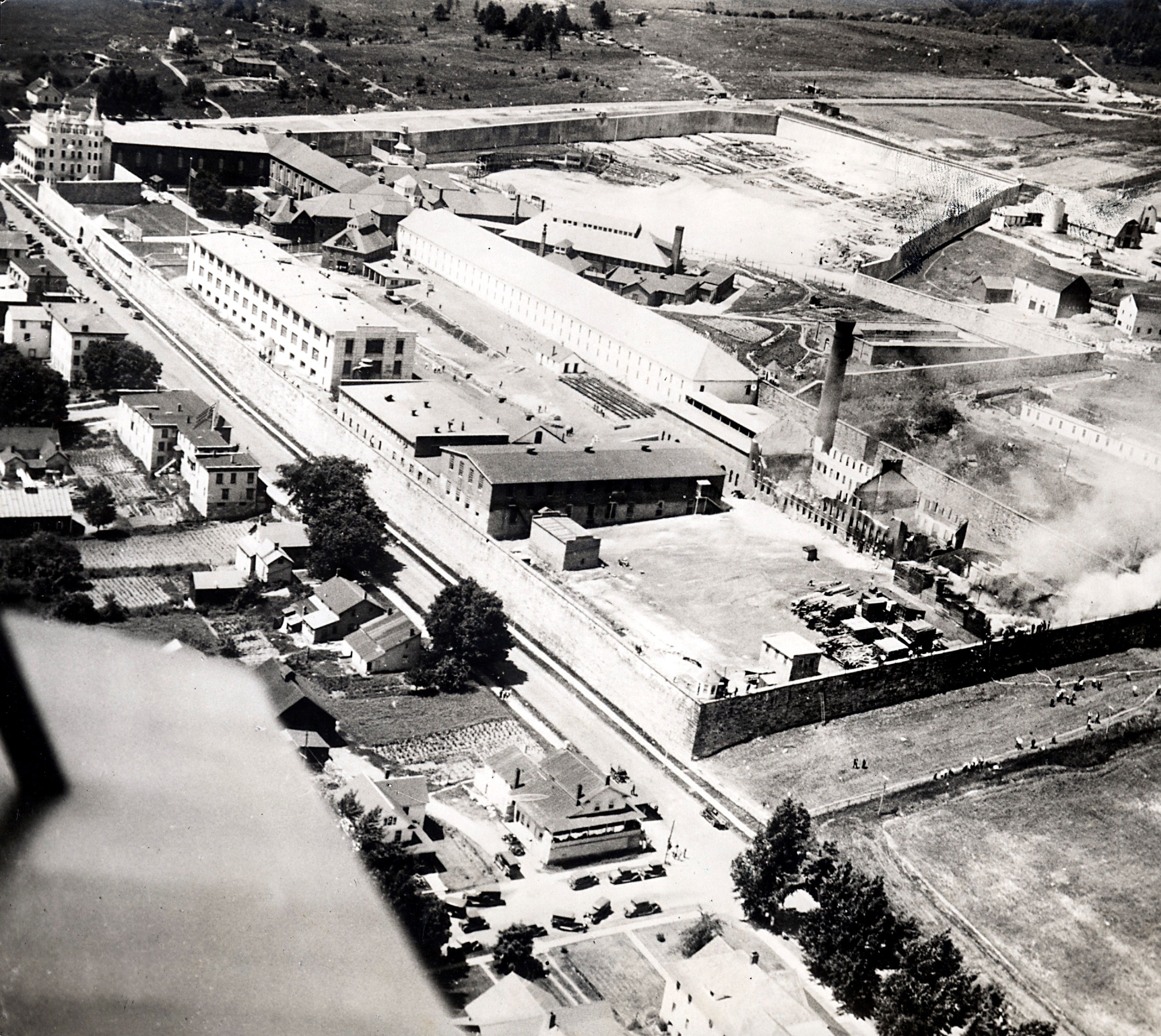
An aerial view of Clinton Prison, 1929

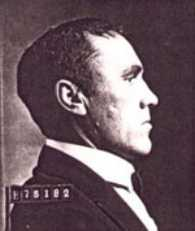
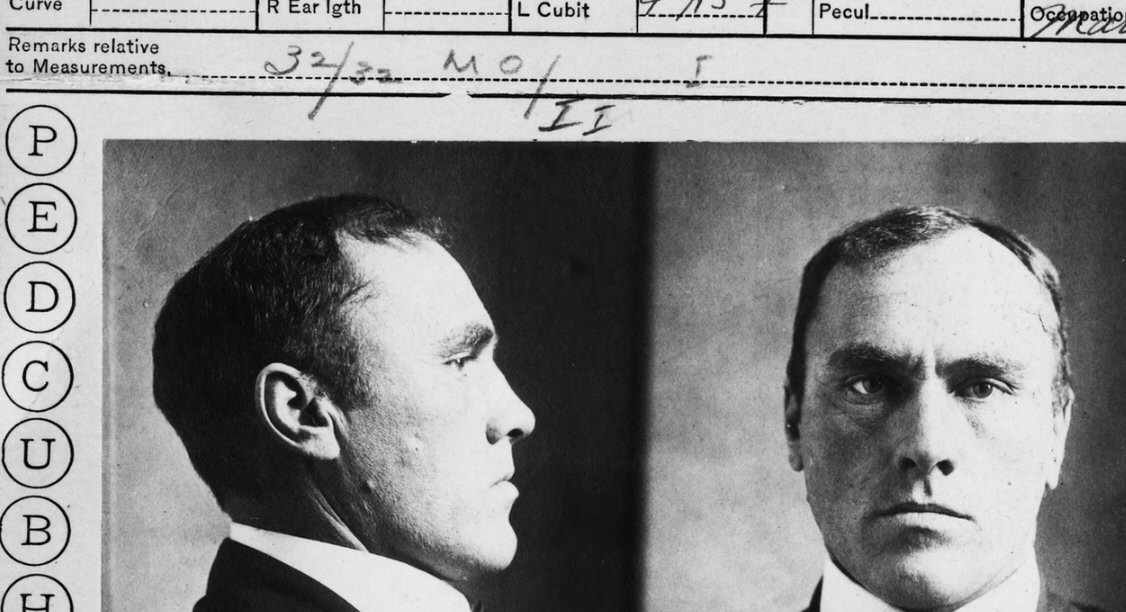
Panzram, a.k.a. John O'Leary #75182, Sing Sing Prison, 1923

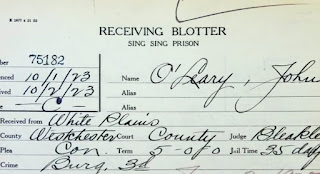
Sing Sing Prison record for "John O'Leary", an alias of Panzram, October 1, 1923

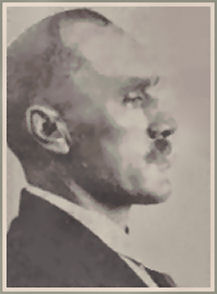
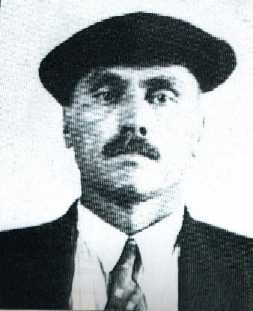
Panzram, a.k.a. John O'Leary, Clinton Prison, 1923

=== Return to the US ===
After his return to the U.S., he thought of becoming a professional hitman using the pistol he obtained in the Congo. In 1922, he had the gun fitted with a silencer by the Maxim Silent Firearms Co. in Hartford, Connecticut. But when he test fired it later, he found that the weapon still made a great deal of noise, much to his disappointment. "If that heavy calibered pistol and the silencer had only worked as I thought it would, I would have gone into the murder business on a wholesale scale," he wrote years later.

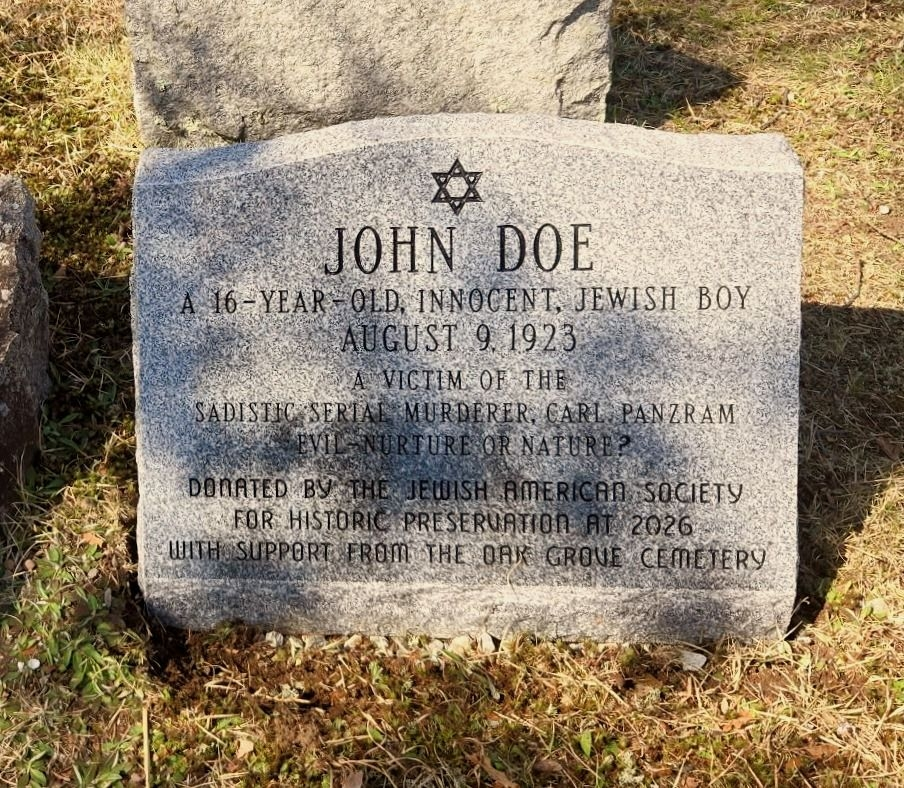
The gravestone of an unidentified victim, whose epitaph reads, in part: "Evil – Nurture or Nature?"

Panzram asserted he raped and killed two small boys, beating one to death with a rock on July 18, 1922, in Salem, Massachusetts, (Note: The Massachusetts victim was identified as Henry McMahon who was found on Highland Ave dead of injury to skull fracture on right side and base due to violence.) and strangling the other later that year near New Haven. (Note: New London, Connecticut, police announced in October 1928 they were unable to corroborate Panzram's confession, but in August 1923, a crime scene consistent with Panzram's description was discovered near New Haven. The Connecticut Bridgeport Telegram published reports on the decomposed unknown victim remains found on August 10 (p.1) and August 11, 1923 (p.10). Another report of the murdered victim appeared in the Connecticut newspaper The Day. The Connecticut victim was killed by strangulation; because of the condition of the remains the Coroner ordered "John Doe" buried August 11, 1923. The John Doe had brown hair, was estimated to be approximately 20-years-old, measured 5 ft 7 in (1.70 m), and weighed around 150 lb (68 kg). He wore a striped brown suit and had a chauffeur's cap under one arm. The cause of death was determined to be strangulation via a belt drawn tightly around the neck. A handkerchief with a wad of cotton inside had also been tied around his mouth. Two wounds on the victim's chest were initially mistaken for gunshots but were later theorized to be injuries caused by the killer's shoes when holding the victim down. Panzram confessed to the murder in 1928, claiming that he had lured the victim into the woods before sexually assaulting and strangling him. Panzram stated that the victim was a 16-year-old Jewish boy who wore thick glasses and that he enjoyed killing the victim because John Doe was the son or nephew of a Brooklyn NY policeman. A first degree murder warrant was issued for Panzram, but proceedings were interrupted when he murdered a prison guard the following year, for which he was subsequently executed.) After his murder spree in Salem, Panzram worked as a night watchman in Yonkers, New York, north of Manhattan, at the Abeeco Mill factory. In Providence, Rhode Island, he stole a 38-foot yawl from a marina and sailed to New Haven, seeking victims to rob and rape, and boats to steal.

In June 1923 at Larchmont, New York, he stole the yacht of Dr. Charles Paine. The boat was found a short time later off the coast of New Rochelle, New York. Panzram had lost rudder control and smashed the craft onto the rocks. In New Rochelle, Panzram burglarized the Police Commissioner's yacht moored off Premium Point and stole a .38 caliber handgun from its galley. He picked up a 15-year-old boy named George Walosin and promised him a job on the yawl, but instead raped him.

On June 27, on the river near Kingston, New York, Panzram claimed to have picked a man up but, believing the man was going to attempt to rob him, used a .38 caliber pistol from the New Rochelle burglary to kill the John Doe victim, throwing the body into the river. On June 28, Panzram and Walosin docked at Poughkeepsie. Panzram stole $1,000 worth of fishing nets. At Newburgh, Walosin, having witnessed the murder the day before, jumped overboard and swam to shore. He reported to police in Yonkers that he had been sexually assaulted by Panzram. An alert went out for "Captain John O'Leary". On June 29, "O'Leary" was arrested in Nyack.

On July 9, Panzram tried to escape from jail. He later conned his lawyer Mr. Cashin by giving him ownership of the stolen yawl in return for bail money. He then skipped bail, and the boat was confiscated by government agents. On August 24, he found work aboard the USS Grant, a troopship bound for China, but was discharged before it left after getting drunk and getting into a fight with the soldiers. On August 26, "O'Leary" was arrested in Larchmont, New York, after breaking into a train depot. Three days later, on August 29, "O'Leary" was cleared as a suspect in the stabbing death of Dorothy Kaufman of Greenburgh, committed a month prior.

He was sentenced to five years' imprisonment for the break-in. While in county jail, under his alias of "O'Leary", he confessed to the alias "Jeff Baldwin", and that he was wanted in Oregon for the murder of Minto. Oregon authorities reported that he was still wanted to serve 14 years of his sentence there. When arrested, he attempted to collect the $500 reward for providing information about himself.

After first being imprisoned in Sing Sing Prison, in October, Panzram was imprisoned at Clinton Prison in Dannemora as Inmate #75182. While there he tried to escape, and ended up with an injured spine and broken ankles. He also claimed to have struck a guard, who survived but was seriously injured. He was discharged in July 1928. After his last arrest in 1928, he claimed to have committed a murder while burglarizing homes between Baltimore and Washington, D.C., and committing a murder in Philadelphia in 1928.

== Final capture ==
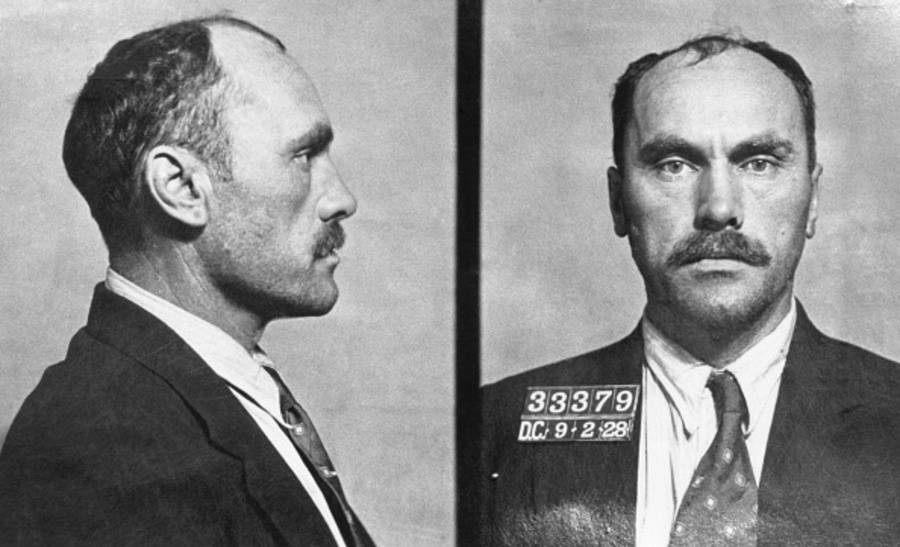
Panzram's September 2, 1928 mug shot, taken after his ultimate arrest in Washington, D.C.

On August 30, 1928, Panzram was arrested in Baltimore for a Washington, D.C., burglary, stealing a radio and jewelry from the home of a dentist on August 20. Three men were arrested as accomplices and most of the jewelry was recovered. Panzram gave his correct name, although he lied by claiming his age as 41 and that he was from Nevada.

During his interrogation, he confessed to killing three young boys earlier that month: one in Salem, one in Connecticut, and a 14-year-old newsboy, Alexander Uszacke, in Philadelphia in the summer of 1928. Panzram had forced Uszacke to assist him in stealing articles from a yacht in the Delaware River and after killing him, wrapped his body in a blanket together with pieces of a radio set. (Note: Luszock's surname was also given as Uszacke, Lusszzock, Uszacke, Lusszzock.) Panzram's confession to killing a boy at Pier 28 on League island near Philadelphia in August 1928 was confirmed. Boston police were unable to corroborate his other confession, the murder of a boy in Charlestown, Massachusetts.

Panzram later wrote that he had contemplated mass murders and other acts of mayhem, such as poisoning a city's water supply with arsenic, or scuttling a British warship in New York Harbor to provoke a war between the United States and Britain. At his last arrest, when he confessed to killing Henry McMahon, he was asked what the point was of killing a child, Panzram answered he hated the human race and that "I get a kick out of murdering people."

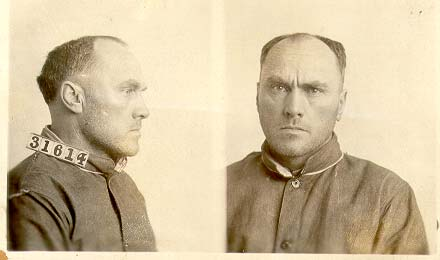
Panzram's 1928 mug shot at USP Leavenworth

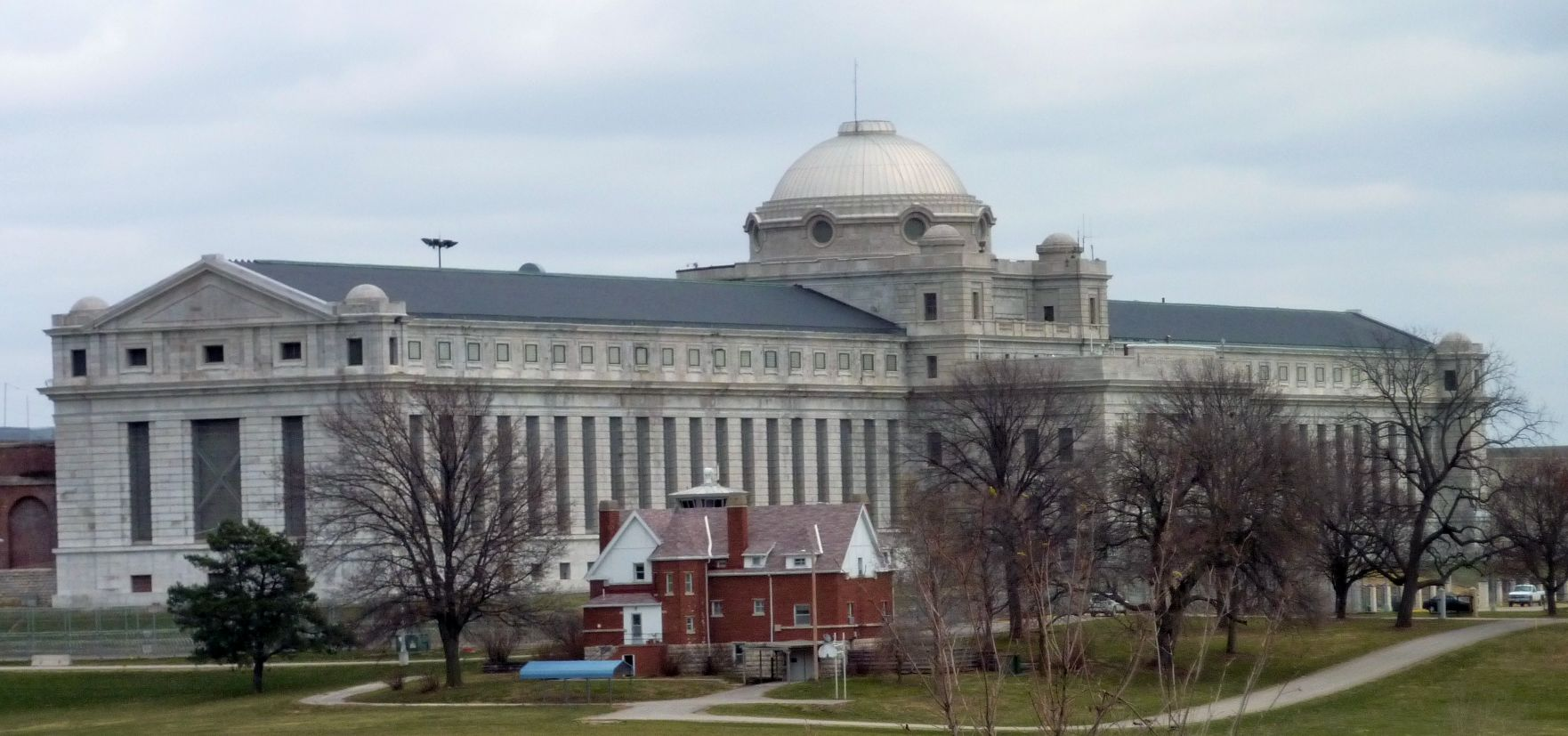
USP Leavenworth in 2009

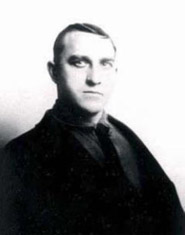
Robert Warnke, the last known victim of Panzram

In light of his extensive criminal record, Panzram was sentenced to 25-years-to-life at Leavenworth Federal Penitentiary, identified as inmate #31614, (nearly the same place he'd been 18 years before). He warned the warden: "I'll kill the first man that bothers me". Because he was considered too psychotic, he was assigned to work alone in the prison laundry room, where the foreman, Robert Warnke, was known to bully and harass other prisoners under him.

Despite being repeatedly warned by Panzram, Warnke continued to antagonize him. On June 20, 1929, Panzram beat Warnke to death with an iron bar. He was convicted and sentenced to death. He refused to allow any appeals of his sentence. In response to offers from death penalty opponents and human rights activists to intervene, he wrote: "The only thanks you and your kind will ever get from me for your efforts on my behalf is that I wish you all had one neck and that I had my hands on it."

While on death row, Panzram was befriended by an officer named Henry Philip Lesser, who would give him money to buy cigarettes. Panzram was so astonished by this act of kindness that after Lesser provided him with writing materials, Panzram wrote a detailed summary of his crimes and his nihilistic philosophy while awaiting execution.

Panzram explicitly denied having any remorse for any of his actions and began his journal with the statement: "In my lifetime I have murdered 21 human beings, I have committed thousands of burglaries, robberies, larcenies, arsons and, last but not least, I have committed sodomy on more than 1,000 male human beings. For all these things I am not in the least bit sorry. I have no conscience so that does not worry me. I don’t believe in Man, God nor devil. I hate the whole damed human race including myself ... I have no desire whatever to reform myself. My only desire is to reform other people who try to reform me. and I believe that the only way to reform people is to kill em. My motto is, Rob em all, Rape em all and Kill em all. I am very truly yours signed Cooper John II Carl Panzram". (Note: Panzram did, however, express some remorse on the next page: “I am sorry that I have mistreated some few animals in my lifetime.”)

== Execution ==
Panzram was hanged on September 5, 1930. As officers attempted to place the customary black-hood over his head, he spat in the executioner's face.

== Legacy ==
Former prison guard Henry Lesser preserved Panzram's letters and autobiographical manuscript. He spent the next four decades trying to have this material published. In 1980, Lesser donated Panzram's materials to the San Diego State University, where they are housed as the "Carl Panzram papers" in the Malcolm A. Love Library.

Writers Thomas E. Gaddis and Joe Long co-wrote Killer: A Journal of Murder (1970). They had consulted with Lesser who let them draw from Panzram's manuscript for their work. In 2005, Fantagraphics Books published Joe Coleman's comic book Muzlers, Guzzlers, and Good Yeggs, which included a section dedicated to the life and times of Carl Panzram.

=== Films ===
- The Yugoslav film Strangler vs. Strangler (Davitelj protiv davitelja) (1984), about an ostensible serial killer, opens with a Panzram quote: "I wish you all had one neck and my hands were around it."
- The German horror film Schramm begins with a quote of Panzram: "Today I am dirty, but tomorrow I'll be just dirt."
- Filmmaker John Borowski released a documentary, Carl Panzram: The Spirit of Hatred and Vengeance (2012).
- The 1995 film, Killer: A Journal of Murder, starred James Woods as Carl Panzram.

== See also ==
- Capital punishment by the United States federal government
- List of people executed by the United States federal government
- List of serial killers in the United States
- List of serial killers by number of victims
- List of serial rapists
