= John Borowski =

American independent filmmaker

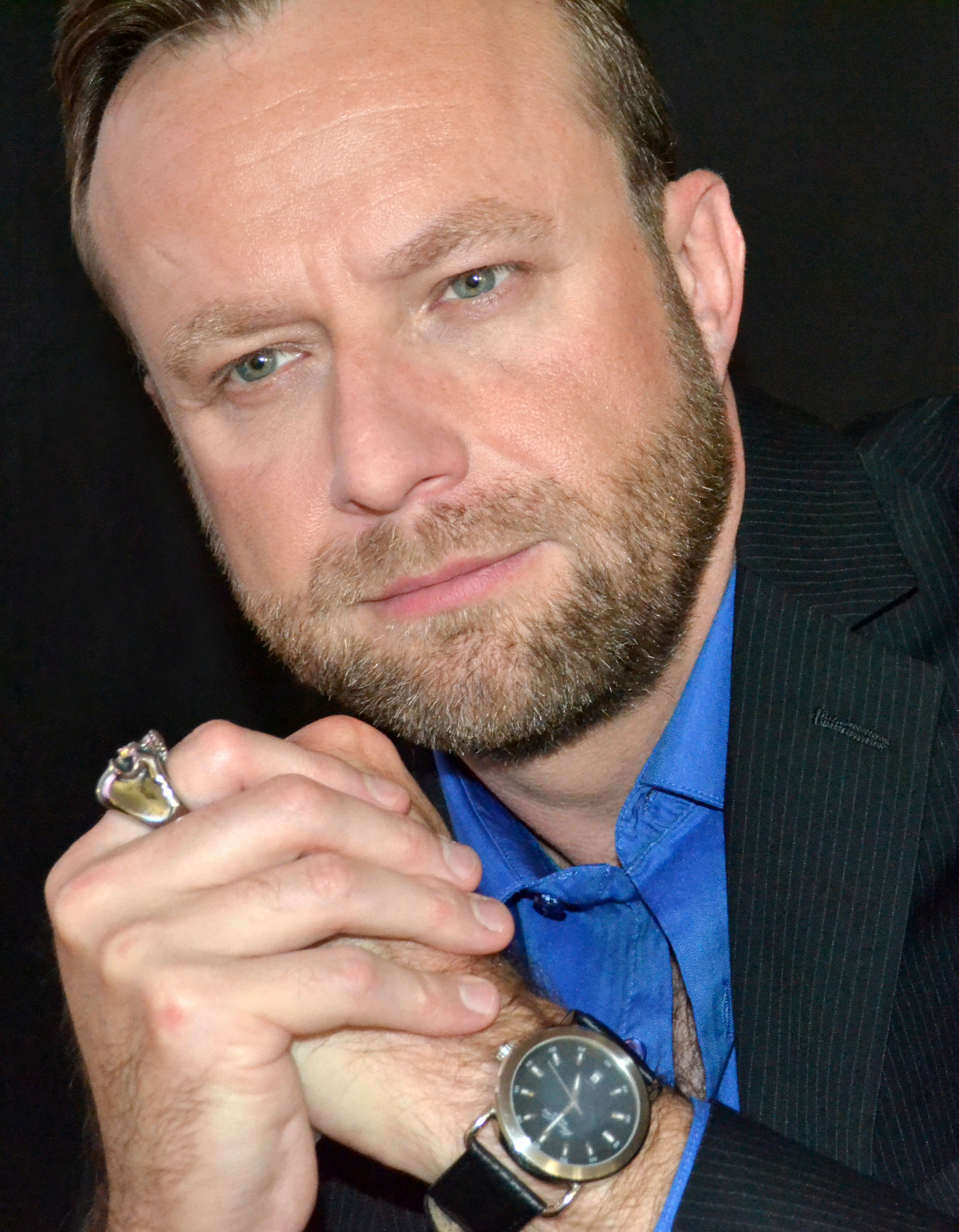
- Born: Chicago, Illinois, U.S.
- Occupations: Director, producer, writer, author
- Website: johnborowski.com

John Borowski is an American independent filmmaker and author. The focus of his work is late nineteenth and early twentieth century serial killers, initially in a trilogy of documentaries on American criminals. More recently, Borowski has focused on the commerce and culture that has grown around such crimes, and on other niche artists.

== Early life ==
After receiving his B.A. from Columbia College Chicago's film program, Borowski freelanced as an editor and cinematographer. Director Willy Laszlo chose Borowski to edit every headlining film for the Chicago Short Comedy Film and Video Festival from 1999 to 2003. In 2004, Borowski's independently produced first film, H.H. Holmes: America's First Serial Killer, was distributed on DVD in North America by Facets Video. Holmes was covered by television (CBS News, Wild Chicago), print (Variety, LA Weekly, Chicago Sun-Times, Ain't It Cool News, Philadelphia Weekly, Chicago Magazine), and radio (Mancow Show, Deadpit Radio). Borowski delivered lectures related to H.H. Holmes to the Chicago Historical Society, Indiana State University, and St. Xavier University. The Strange Case of Dr. H.H. Holmes is an illustrated book published by Borowski containing three primary source books about the Holmes case and Holmes' complete confession. H.H. Holmes has been distributed to over a dozen countries worldwide.

== Career ==
=== Film work ===
Borowski's films are distributed internationally on DVD, television, and streaming. His "historical horror" trilogy of documentary films focus on late nineteenth and early twentieth century serial killers. Borowski directed a trilogy, based on America serial killers, H.H. Holmes: America's First Serial Killer (2004), Albert Fish: In Sin He Found Salvation (2007), and Carl Panzram: The Spirit of Hatred and Vengeance (2012) and Serial Killer Culture (2014) which examines the reasons why artists and collectors are fascinated by serial killers.

Borowski received the 2003 award for Best Director for H.H. Holmes from the Midwest Independent Film Festival, and the film was voted the Best Horror Documentary at the 2004 Screamfest Horror Film Festival. The film has been featured on PBS.

Carl Panzram featured John DiMaggio as the voice of title criminal and murderer, Carl Panzram. Locations for the film included the maximum security prisons of Leavenworth Penitentiary and Clinton Correction Facility, and made use of Panzram's handwritten autobiographical papers at San Diego State University; Carl Panzram received the director's choice award at the 2012 Chicago Horror Film Festival.

Borowski has produced and directed the short films: Mime Time (2013), Rough Crowd (2014), and The Portrait (2015).

In 2014, Borowski released Serial Killer Culture, a film which examines the reasons why artists and collectors are fascinated by serial killers. Through music, painting, filmmaking, writing, and collecting, thirteen individuals are interviewed about creating art and searching for murderous artifacts. As a follow-up to the film, Serial Killer Culture TV was released in 2017. The TV show explores the similar themes including a Jonestown Survivor and how Ripley's Believe It Or Not! acquired the head of German serial killer Peter Kürten.

In addition, Borowski served as an associate producer on the feature Toro Loco (2010), by Chilean filmmaker Patricio Valladares.

In 2024, Borowski produced and directed the mini-series The John Wayne Gacy Murders: Life and Death in Chicago for Amazon Prime. The eight episode series is the first ever historical and chronological study on the life of John Wayne Gacy, featuring interviews with prosecutors, detectives, law enforcement, and attorneys who were directly involved with Gacy. It was released to critical acclaim and has since been released on DVD and Blu-ray home media.

=== Author ===
Borowski has written and published the books: The Strange Case of Dr. H.H. Holmes (2005), Albert Fish: In His Own Words (2014), and The Ed Gein File (2016), which contain case files from the true crime cases.

=== Music videos ===
- Think I'm in Love, by the Das Bruce.
- Mr. Fish, by the Swedish Band, Sparzanza.,
- The Sea/Cellophane, by Dubwitch

=== Projects in production ===
Borowski is currently in post-production on Bloodlines: The Art and Life of Vincent Castiglia, to be released in 2017.

Jesse Pomeroy: The Boston Boy Fiend is a feature documentary film in production, which focuses on the infamous 14 year old boy killer.

== References in published works ==
Borowski's work was featured in The Documentary Moviemaking Course: The Starter Guide to Documentary Filmmaking by K.J. Lindenmuth, and in a self-published work, Murderabilia and True Crime Collecting, by S.F. Scouller.

The Swedish band Sparzanza used the narration by Tony Jay in the Borowski movie Albert Fish in their song "Mr. Fish".

== Guest appearances ==
Borowski was a special guest speaker at the 2012 Indie Horror Fest.

== Personal life ==
Borowski currently resides in Chicago.

== Filmography ==
=== As director ===
- H. H. Holmes: America's First Serial Killer (2004).
- Albert Fish (2007).
- Carl Panzram: The Spirit of Hatred and Vengeance (2012).
- The John Wayne Gacy Murders: Life and Death in Chicago (2020)
- Serial Killer Culture TV (2017)
- Bloodlines: The Art and Life of Vincent Castiglia (2017)

=== Other roles ===
- Toro Loco (2010), by Chilean filmmaker Patricio Valladares, as producer.
