= Jaga =

Jaga may refer to:

== Peoples ==
- Jaga (Rajasthan), a social caste of genealogists in Rajasthan, India
- Jaga (Muslim caste), a Muslim community in the state of Uttar Pradesh, India
- Jaga (Kongo), two bands of warriors encountered by the Portuguese in the African kingdom of Kongo

== Fictional characters ==
- Jaga the Wise, a character from the American animated television series ThunderCats
- Jaga, several scorpion-like species in the Bionicle line of Lego toys
- Jaga, in the Japanese anime Beast King GoLion
- Jaga, lord of the ThunderCats

== Other uses ==
- Jaga (kingdom), a pre-colonial Central African state
- Jaga Jazzist, a Norwegian jazz/electronica/prog-crossover band
- Jagiellonia Bialystok, a Polish football team

== See also ==
- Geronimo ji-Jaga (1947–2011), black panther
- Baba Yaga, a witch in Slavic mythology (alternate spelling Baby Jaga)
- Jagga (disambiguation)
