= Banghart =

Banghart is a surname. Notable people with the surname include:

- Basil Banghart (1901–1982), American criminal, burglar, and prison escape artist
- Courtney Banghart (born 1978), American basketball player and coach
- Matthew Banghart (born 1980), American Professor of Neurobiology
