= Carl Panzram: The Spirit of Hatred and Vengeance =

- Directed by: John Borowski
- Written by: John Borowski
- Produced by: John Borowski
- Starring: John DiMaggio
- Distributed by: Waterfront Productions
- Release date: May 28, 2011
- Running time: 80 minutes
- Country: United States
- Language: English

Carl Panzram: The Spirit of Hatred and Vengeance is a 2011 documentary film by John Borowski about the life and death of serial killer Carl Panzram. It is Borowski's third film.

== Synopsis ==
A lifelong criminal and serial killer, Carl Panzram befriends Henry Lesser, a young jail guard at the Washington, D.C. jail in 1928. After hearing of Panzram's tortured upbringing, Lesser sends Panzram one dollar and convinces the killer to write his autobiography while secretly supplying him with pencil and paper. Panzram writes over 40,000 words documenting his entire life of incarceration, torture, rape, and murder.

The film includes footage of Panzram's handwritten papers, Leavenworth Penitentiary, the Clinton Correctional Facility, the Minnesota Correctional Facility – Red Wing, and an exclusive interview with Panzram's jail guard, Henry Lesser.

John DiMaggio provides the voice of Carl Panzram.

== Awards ==
2012 Director's Choice Award - Chicago Horror Film Festival
