= Damant =

Damant is a surname. Notable people with the surname include:

- Andrée Damant, French actress
- Derek Damant (died 2021), South African bishop
- Guybon Chesney Castell Damant (1881–1963), British navy officer
- Luke Damant (born 2000), Australian Youtuber
- Nicholas Damant (c. 1531–1616), Dutch magistrate and statesman
- Pieter Damant (1530–1609), bishop of Ghent
