= Luke Damant =

Australian YouTuber (born 2000)

- Born: Luke Damant; 18 May 2000 (age 26); Sydney, New South Wales, Australia
- Occupation: YouTuber

YouTube information
- Channel: LukeDamant
- Genre: Travel influencer
- Subscribers: 1.86 million
- Views: 4.54 million
- Last updated: 21 May 2026

Luke Damant (born 18 May 2000, in Sydney) is an Australian YouTuber, known for his videos related to tourism and travel.

In 2025, he notably visited Iran, documenting the effect that the international sanctions have had on the country.

He regularly collaborates with British YouTuber Harry Jaggard.
