= H. H. Holmes: America's First Serial Killer =

2004 American documentary film

H. H. Holmes
- Theatrical release poster
- Directed by: John Borowski
- Written by: John Borowski
- Produced by: John Borowski
- Starring: Tony Jay; Willy Laszlo; Beka; Ed Bertagnoli; Tom Ciappa
- Distributed by: Facets Video
- Release date: October 26, 2004
- Running time: 63 minutes
- Country: United States
- Language: English

H. H. Holmes: America's First Serial Killer is a 2004 biographical documentary film directed by John Borowski. The film relates the true life story of American serial killer H. H. Holmes. Produced over a four-year period, the film highlights locations such as Holmes' childhood home in Gilmanton, New Hampshire, and the courtroom in Philadelphia where the "trial of the century" was held.

The film focuses on Dr. Holmes' entire life (1861–1896). It consists of reenactments, expert interviews, and period photography. The film is narrated by Tony Jay.

== Awards ==
- Screamfest Horror Film Festival - 2004 - Best Horror Documentary
- Midwest Independent Film Festival - 2003 Best Director, John Borowski for H. H. Holmes: America's First Serial Killer
