= William H. Taft Mansion =

- Interactive map of the William H. Taft Mansion area

General information
- Type: Commercial
- Architectural style: Second Empire architecture
- Location: 111 Whitney Avenue; New Haven, Connecticut; United States 06510
- Coordinates: 41.31370°N 72.92127°W
- Completed: 1870

Technical details
- Floor count: 4
- Floor area: 10,445 sq ft (970.4 m^{2})

The William H. Taft Mansion is a historical site located at 111 Whitney Avenue in New Haven, Connecticut, United States. It was built in 1870. It is known as the Taft Mansion because U.S. President William Howard Taft owned it for a period around the time of World War I, although he may never have lived in it. In 1920 it was famously burgled by Carl Panzram, in revenge for Taft sentencing him to three years in prison at Fort Leavenworth. After selling what he had stolen, he went on a further crime spree which often included shooting his victims with a gun he stole from the house. Taft owned the house until 1921.

In 2014, the William F. Buckley Jr. Program at Yale University relocated to the mansion with an option to purchase it. The location across the street from the Peabody Museum is particularly apt for the group, as Taft was both a Republican and a Yale graduate.

== Facilities ==
As a commercial property, the site includes 7,500 square feet (700 m^{2}) of leased office space with a parking lot with two dozen spaces. The third floor is 2,600 square feet (240 m^{2}) of space and may be individually leased. The location on Whitney Ave near Trumbull Street is within Yale's neighborhood and it sits on approximately 0.35 acres (0.14 ha) of land.

The house was sold for $2.6 million in 2018.
