= Harry Jaggard =

British YouTuber (born 1996)

- Born: Harry Jaggard; 4 April 1997 (age 29); Warwick, Warwickshire, England
- Occupation: YouTuber

YouTube information
- Channel: Harry Jaggard
- Genre: Travel influencer
- Subscribers: 2.7 million
- Views: 1.3 billion
- Last updated: 2 February 2026

Harry Jaggard (born 4 April 1997) is an English YouTuber, known for his videos related to tourism and travel.

== Biography ==
Jaggard was born on 6 April 1997, in Coventry, Warwickshire. Jaggard attended Princethorpe College, a Catholic independent day school in Rugby, Warwickshire.

In 2025, Jaggard visited North Korea, using a loophole to bypass tourism bans, by participating in the Pyongyang Marathon.

He regularly collaborates with Australian YouTuber, Luke Damant.
