= Jagger =

Jagger is an English surname. Someone who owned and/or managed a team of packhorses was known as a "jagger", making this occupation the likely origin of the surname.

More rarely, the name is used as a given name.

Notable people with the surname include:

- Amy Jagger (1908–1993), British gymnast
- Bianca Jagger (born 1945), Nicaraguan-born human rights advocate
- Charles Sargeant Jagger (1885–1934), sculptor; brother of Edith and David
- Chris Jagger (born 1947), British musician; brother of Mick Jagger
- David Jagger (1891–1958), English portrait painter; brother of Edith and Charles
- Dean Jagger (1903–1991), American actor
- Edith Jagger (1880–1977), British artist and textile designer; sister of Charles and David
- Elizabeth Jagger (born 1984), American-English model and actress; daughter of Mick Jagger and Jerry Hall, sister of Georgia
- Georgia May Jagger (born 1992), British fashion model and designer; daughter of Mick Jagger and Jerry Hall, sister of Elizabeth
- Jade Jagger (born 1971), jewellery designer; daughter of Mick and Bianca Jagger
- John William Jagger, (1859–1930), South African businessman and cabinet minister
- Mick Jagger (born 1943), British lead singer of The Rolling Stones

Notable people with the given name include:

- Jagger Eaton (born 2001), American skateboarder
- Jagger Jones (born 2002), American racing driver

Fictional characters:

- Jagger Cates, on American soap opera General Hospital
- Mr Jaggers in Great Expectations

Other uses

- Jagger (1858–1891), builder of a locomotive (0-6-0T, works number 1884) in 1881 for Newfoundland Railway
- Jagger (animal), the offspring of a male jaguar and a female tiger
- Moves like Jagger, a 2011 song by American pop rock band Maroon 5 featuring American singer Christina Aguilera.
- "Jagger" (song), a 2023 song by Emilia
- Jagger Library, University of Cape Town Libraries
- A jagging iron, used for crimping dough - see Crimp (joining) § Food

== See also ==
- Jagga (disambiguation)
- Jaggard
- Jäger (disambiguation) (includes Jaeger)
