= Jagga =

Jagga may refer to:

- Chaga people, Bantu-speaking indigenous Africans
- Jagga (film), 1964 Indian Punjabi-language film by Jugal Kishore
- Jagga, a fictional villain in the 1951 Indian film Awaara, played by K. N. Singh
- Jagga, titular character of the 2017 Indian film Jagga Jasoos (lit. 'Detective Jagga'), played by Ranbir Kapoor

== Persons ==
- Jagga Jatt (c. 1901–1931), Punjabi heroic rebel
- Jagga Gujjar (1940-July 1968), Lahore bandit
- Jagga Reddy (born 1966), Indian politician

== See also ==
- Jaga (disambiguation)
- Jagger, a surname
