= Albert Fish (film) =

- Theatrical release poster
- Directed by: John Borowski
- Written by: John Borowski
- Produced by: John Borowski
- Starring: Tony Jay; Oto Brezina; Bob Dunsworth; Harvey Fisher; Derek Gaspar; Nathan Hall; Garrett Shriver
- Music by: Corey A. Jackson
- Distributed by: Facets Video
- Release date: March 27, 2007
- Running time: 86 minutes
- Country: United States
- Language: English

Albert Fish: In Sin He Found Salvation is a 2007 biographical documentary film directed by John Borowski. The film relates the life story of American serial killer and cannibal Albert Fish. In addition to interviews, period footage and photographs, the film also recreates many of Fish's crimes in numerous reenactment scenes. The film is also Tony Jay's final work, having died seven months prior to its release.

== Premise ==
The film tells the true story of a sadomasochistic cannibal, child molester, and serial killer, who lured children to their deaths in Depression-era New York City. Elderly but still deadly, Fish was inspired by biblical tales as he took the stories of pain, punishment, atonement, and suffering literally as he preyed on victims to torture and sacrifice.

== Reception ==
“Borowski offers plenty of material in his second docudrama to generate many conversations, raising his work above B-movie gore into the realm of philosophical discourse.”

"A very well made and well directed examination of one of American history's most unusual and depraved subjects."
