= Tony Jay =

British actor (1933–2006)

- Jay in 1990
- Born: 2 February 1933; London, England
- Died: 13 August 2006 (aged 73); Los Angeles, California, U.S.
- Resting place: Forest Lawn Memorial Park, Hollywood Hills
- Education: Pinner County Grammar School
- Occupation: Actor
- Years active: 1966–2006
- Spouse: Marta MacGeraghty (m. 2004)
- Children: 1

Tony Jay (2 February 1933 – 13 August 2006) was a British actor. A former member of the Royal Shakespeare Company, he was known for his voice work in radio, animation, film, and video games. Jay was particularly noted for his distinctive deep baritone voice, which often led to him being cast in villainous or authoritative roles. His voice acting roles included Judge Claude Frollo in Disney's The Hunchback of Notre Dame (1996), Megabyte in ReBoot (1994–2001), Shere Khan in The Jungle Book 2 (replacing George Sanders, who played the character in the original film), as well as the TV series TaleSpin, the Elder God (plus various other roles) in the Legacy of Kain series of video games and Dr. Lipschitz in Rugrats.

Jay also made many distinguished on-screen appearances, including the role of Nigel St John on Lois and Clark: The New Adventures of Superman (1993–1995). He further made guest appearances on programs including The Golden Girls in 1987, the villainous Paracelsus in the Beauty and the Beast TV series (1987–1990), Twin Peaks in 1990 to 1991, and Night Court in 1991. Jay also portrayed Professor Werner in Twins (1988), the father figure/mentor to Arnold Schwarzenegger's character, Julius Benedict.

== Early life ==
Jay was born in London. He attended Pinner County Grammar School, and completed his National Service with the Royal Air Force in 1953. He later recalled, "I was always an actor at school"; but opted for the financial security of a real estate business. Jay moved to South Africa in about 1966, after hearing of the potential there for his line of work. He left South Africa to return to England in 1973, after which he moved to the United States in 1986.

== Career ==
While establishing his real estate business in England, Jay acted occasionally in amateur productions.

=== South Africa ===
Within three months of relocating to South Africa at the age of 33, Jay found himself acting in radio dramas such as the detective series Sounds of Darkness where he played a savvy but blind FBI agent (1967–1972). The experience led him to decide to take acting up professionally.

Jay acted, wrote, and directed radio plays on the South African Broadcasting Corporation's first commercial radio station, Springbok Radio (1950–85). He was especially associated with the comic series Taxi! (1969–1972,1975–1978), in which he not only portrayed New York cabby Red Kowalski, but also co-wrote many scripts with Joe Stewardson. Other shows in which he was involved included Lux Radio Theatre, Playhouse 90, and Tuesday Theatre. Jay adapted, cast, and directed the first 6 months of episodes for The Avengers. The series, based on Seasons 4–6 of the 1960s British television series of the same name, was broadcast on Springbok from 6 December 1971 to 28 December 1973. To bridge the gap between the visual orientation of the British television series and the sound-only perspective of radio, Jay created a narrator which he embued with irony and scepticism.

Jay's voice work led him to do commercials for companies such as Gunston Cigarettes, Barclays Bank, and Bols Brandy.

=== United Kingdom ===
After Jay's return to Britain in 1973, he worked in various television productions. For the BBC series Fall of Eagles (1974) he portrayed Tsar Alexander III of Russia, during which time he met Patrick Stewart, who played Vladimir Lenin. Jay appeared as the merchant in Shakespeare's Timon of Athens (1981) for BBC Shakespeare, and in single episodes of popular television programmes such as The Sweeney (1975), The Professionals (1978) and the comedy Whoops Apocalypse (1982).

During this period he was cast as Vladimir Maximovitch in Woody Allen's Love and Death (1975), which was shot in Hungary and France. George Lucas met with Jay about playing Obi-Wan Kenobi in a planned film with the working title Galactic Warfare. Despite Jay agreeing to the role, Lucas decided to cast Alec Guinness, instead.

On stage he had small roles in plays such as Anton Chekhov's The Three Sisters (1976) and Terence Rattigan's The Deep Blue Sea (1981). More important roles followed with an appearance as Jaggers in Great Expectations (1984) at the Old Vic, and as Shylock in The Merchant of Venice.

Jay was cast as Vincent Crummles in the Royal Shakespeare Company's 8 1/2-hour-long production of The Life and Adventures of Nicholas Nickleby (1986) at Stratford-upon-Avon.

=== United States ===
After a tour of Britain, Nicholas Nickleby embarked on a limited tour of the United States, starting with performances in Los Angeles in June 1986, then on to Boston, Philadelphia, Washington, D.C., and New York City. "Even before I left England, I told friends I'd be staying if I got the chance," he recalled in a 1986 The New York Times interview.

During its run from August to October 1986 at the Broadhurst Theatre on Broadway, Jay's performance was described as "brilliantly played" by The New York Times. Consequently, he was nominated for the 1987 Drama Desk Award as Outstanding Featured Actor in a Play.

Jay's acting drew the attention of an agent who arranged for him to return from England to the United States for an audition. Jay was cast in a pilot program called Circus which was unsuccessful. On set Jay met make-up artist Kathy Rogers, who would become his second wife. He moved to the United States where he became a resident.

In addition, Jay won parts in television series such as Night Court (1984), The Golden Girls (1987), Twins (1988), and Eerie, Indiana (1991). Bigger roles included Paracelsus on the 1987 CBS TV series adaptation of Beauty and the Beast; Minister Campio on Star Trek: The Next Generation (1992); and Lex Luthor's villainous aide-de-camp Nigel St. John in Lois & Clark: The New Adventures of Superman (1993–95).

Jay's voice-over work included Monsieur D'Arque, an amoral asylum superintendent, in Disney's 1991 hit animated film version of Beauty and the Beast. From 1994 to 2001 he supplied the voice for the virus Megabyte in the animated series ReBoot. According to one source, Jay was preferred to Patrick Stewart, Derek Jacobi and Ian McKellen for the voice of the main antagonist Judge Claude Frollo in Disney's 1996 animated film adaptation of The Hunchback of Notre Dame, directed by Gary Trousdale and Kirk Wise, who had also steered his performance in the film version of Beauty and the Beast. Jay reprised Frollo's voice for Walt Disney World's nighttime light and fireworks show Fantasmic! From 1995 to 1996 Jay was the voice of the alien warlord Lord Dregg, the villain during the last two seasons of the original 1987 Teenage Mutant Ninja Turtles animated TV series.

He is also well known among fans of the 1996–2003 video game series Legacy of Kain for his voicing of the original Mortanius and of the Elder God, alongside several other minor characters.

In various animated projects Jay took over the voice of Shere Khan, which actor George Sanders had originated for the 1967 Disney animated film The Jungle Book. In 11 episodes spanning 1990–91, Jay voiced Shere Khan for Disney's animated TV series TaleSpin, The Jungle Book: Rhythm and Groove videogame (2000), and House of Mouse (2001–02). His final appearance as Khan came in the 2003 film The Jungle Book 2. His final role was voicing Spiderus in Miss Spider's Sunny Patch Friends.

Jay was a devotee of classic Broadway and made several recordings and performances of old-time Broadway lyrics, in spoken-word form. A CD of these readings, Speaking of Broadway, was released in 2005; a version recorded in 1996 was entitled Poets on Broadway, as was his website. On it Jay recites lyrics written by the likes of Noël Coward, Ira Gershwin, and Oscar Hammerstein, accompanied by synthesized music which he composed.

== Personal life, illness, and death ==
Jay began a relationship with Marta MacGeraghty in 1974. They had a son, born in 1989. They did not marry until 2004, and remained together until Jay's death in 2006.

In April 2006, Jay underwent surgery at Cedars-Sinai Medical Center in Los Angeles to remove a non-cancerous tumour from his lungs. Afterwards, he became critically ill and was readmitted to Cedars Sinai, where he was pronounced dead on 13 August 2006, aged 73.

== Filmography ==
=== Live Action Roles ===
Year	Title	Role	Notes
1968	Majuba: Heuwel van Duiwe		Uncredited
1969	Petticoat Safari		Co-writer
1970	Lied in My hart	Rudi	
1970	Scotty & Co.	Ginger Sid	
1970	Sien Jou Môre	Prof. Ivan Ullman	(voiced by Danie Smuts)
1970	Taxi!	Red Kowalski	
1972	My Way	Natie Kaplan	
1972	Leatherlip		Uncredited
1975	Love and Death	Vladimir Maximovich	
1977	My Way II	Natie Kaplan	
1978	The Greek Tycoon	Doctor	
1987	Little Dorrit	Doctor	
1987–1990	Beauty and the Beast	Paracelsus	
1988	Twins	Professor Werner & The Narrator	
1988	My Stepmother Is an Alien	Council Chief	
2011	Seek	Producer	Posthumous release

=== Voice Roles ===
Year	Title	Role	Notes
1981	Time Bandits	The Supreme Being	
1989	Asterix and the Big Fight	Narrator	English version
1991	Beauty and the Beast	Monsieur D'Arque	
1991	Beasties	Frankie	Direct-to-video
1992	Tom and Jerry: The Movie	Lickboot	
1994	Thumbelina	Bull	Uncredited
1994	Scooby-Doo! in Arabian Nights	Lord of the Amulet	Television film
1996	All Dogs Go to Heaven 2	Reginald	
1996	The Hunchback of Notre Dame	Judge Claude Frollo	
1998	The Rugrats Movie	Dr. Werner Lipschitz	
1998	An American Tail: The Treasure of Manhattan Island	Mr. Toplofty	Direct-to-video
1999	Austin Powers: The Spy Who Shagged Me	Narrator	Uncredited
2001	Recess: School's Out	Dr. Rosenthal	
2001	Race to Space	Narrator	
2002	Treasure Planet	Narrator	
2003	The Jungle Book 2	Shere Khan	
2003	Rugrats Go Wild	Dr. Werner Lipschitz	
2005	Nausicaä of the Valley of the Wind	Narrator	Disney 2005 dub
2007	Albert Fish: In Sin He Found Salvation	Narrator	Posthumous release

=== Television ===
Year	Title	Role	Notes
1974	Fall of Eagles	Tsar Alexander III	2 episodes
1974	Justice	Mr. Papalonios	Episode: "Collision Course"
1974	The Case of Eliza Armstrong	Henry Poland QC	1 episode
1975	Within These Walls	Mr. Graham	Episode: "Nowhere for the Kids"
1975	The Sweeney	Lambourne	Episode: "Golden Boy"
1975	Affairs of the Heart	Sir Luke Strett	1 episode
1975	The Hanged Man	Lazlo	Episode: "Grail and Platter"
1975	Six Days of Justice	Edwin Lovatt	Episode: "Angelica"
1977	The XYY Man	Jacob Mahler	2 episodes
1978	The Professionals	Foreign Observer 1	Episode: "Blind Run"
1980	Escape	Colonel Jalbout	Episode: "Kim Philby"
1981	Timon of Athens	Merchant	Television film
1982	Whoops Apocalypse	Bagatu	Episode: "How to Get Rid of It"
1982	The Agatha Christie Hour	Count Streptitch	Episode: "Jane in Search of a Job"
1985	Dempsey and Makepeace	Abe Moser	Episode: "Armed and Extremely Dangerous"
1986	The Greatest Adventure: Stories from the Bible	Caiaphas, Jerusalem Man No. 3, God	2 episodes
1987	Riviera	Habib	Television film
1987	The Golden Girls	Laszlo Gregorian	Episode: "The Artist"
1987	Hunter	Father Michaels	Episode: "Allegra"
1988	Beverly Hills Buntz	Sheik Mohammed	Episode: "Buntz of the Desert"
1988	Circus	Conrad Simpson	TV Pilot
1988–1989	Beauty and the Beast	Paracelsus	6 episodes
1989	Mr. Belvedere	Captain Peel	Episode: "Mutiny"
1989	The Smurfs	Merlin	Voice, episode: "The Smurfs of the Round Table"
1989	The New Lassie	Mr. Shepherd	Episode: "Once Upon a Time..."
1989	Newhart	Reginald Wooster	Episode: "Good Lord Loudon"
1989	The Easter Story	Caiaphas, Jerusalem Man #3	Animated short
1990	Christine Cromwell		Episode: "In Vino Veritas"
1990	His & Hers	Dr. Zimmerman	Episode: "Fear of Marriage"
1990	Rainbow Drive	Max Hollister	Television film
1990	Peter Pan and the Pirates	Alf Mason	Voice, 16 episodes
1990	The Adventures of Don Coyote and Sancho Panda		Voice, episode: "Pity the Poor Pirate"
1990–1991	Twin Peaks	Dougie Milford	3 episodes
1990–1991	TaleSpin	Mr. Shere Khan, Zoo Director, Elevator Guard, "Scottie" Jock	Voice, 11 episodes
1991	Matlock	John Bosley Hackett	Episode: "The Critic"
1991	Absolute Strangers	Weisfeld	Television film
1991	Murphy Brown	Dr. Wade Benoit	Episode: "Q & A on FYI"
1991	Eerie, Indiana	Sir Boris von Orloff	Episode: "Scariest Home Videos"
1991	Dynasty: The Reunion	Dr. Jobinet	2 episodes
1991	Darkwing Duck	Grim Reaper	Voice, episode: "Dead Duck"
1991	Night Court	Joseph Schiavelli	Episode: "Guess Who's Listening to Dinner?"
1991	Who's the Boss?	Paul Murphy	Episode: "Grandmommie Dearest"
1991	Sisters	Charles Dickens	Episode: "Eggnog"
1991	Adventures in Odyssey	Fred J. Faustus	Voice, episode: "The Knight Travellers"
1991–1993	The Legend of Prince Valiant	Cynan, Baron Alric, Magistrate	Voice, 5 episodes
1992	Jonah		Voice, 1 episode
1992	Star Trek: The Next Generation	Third Minister Campio	Episode: "Cost of Living"
1992	Tom & Jerry Kids		Voice, episode: "Penthouse Mouse/12 Angry Sheep/The Ant Attack"
1992–2003	Rugrats	Werner Lipschitz, various voices	Voice, 10 episodes
1993	Sonic the Hedgehog	Guardian	Voice, episode: "Super Sonic"; uncredited
1993	The Little Mermaid	Wish Star	Voice, episode: "Wish Upon a Starfish"
1993	Fugitive Nights: Danger in the Desert		Television film
1993	The Adventures of Brisco County, Jr.	Judge Silot Gatt	Episode: "Brisco for the Defense"
1993	2 Stupid Dogs	The Chief	Voice, 13 episodes
1993–1994	Mighty Max	Virgil/Narrator, Norman's Dad, Witch Doctor	Voice, 40 episodes
1993–1995	Lois & Clark: The New Adventures of Superman	Nigel St. John	7 episodes
1994	Picket Fences	Chief Rabbi	Episode: "Squatter's Rights"
1994	Duckman		Voice, episode: "Ride the High School"
1994	Scooby-Doo in Arabian Nights		Voice, television film
1994	Beethoven	Watson	Voice, episode: "Scent of a Mutt/Down on the Farm"
1994–1995	Skeleton Warriors	Golden Skull	Voice, 13 episodes
1994–1996	Teenage Mutant Ninja Turtles	Lord Dregg, Megavolt/Alex Winter	Voice, 17 episodes
1994–1996	The Tick	Chairface Chippendale	Voice, 7 episodes
1994–1996	Fantastic Four	Galactus, Terrax	Voice, 5 episodes
1994–2001	ReBoot	Megabyte	Voice, 26 episodes
1995	Aladdin	Khartoum	Voice, episode: "The Book of Khartoum"
1995	Aaahh!!! Real Monsters	Frederick, Chief	Voice, episode: "Eau de Krumm/O'Lucky Monster"
1995	Gargoyles	Anubis	Voice, episode: "Grief"
1995	The Ghosts of Gettysburg	Narrator	Voice, uncredited
1995–1996	The Twisted Tales of Felix the Cat	Peeping Duck, Jaggo Doughnut, Mr. Wizard	3 episodes
1995–1996	The Savage Dragon	Overlord, Mindwarp, Reporter	Voice, 15 episodes
1996	Russia's Last Tsar		Voice, National Geographic special
1996	Siegfried & Roy: Masters of the Impossible		Voice
1996	Captain Planet and the Planeteers	Yeti	Voice, episode: "Twelve Angry Animals"
1996	Animaniacs	Narrator	Voice, episode: "Gunga Dot"
1996	Superman: The Animated Series	Sul-Van	Voice, episode: "The Last Son of Krypton" Pt. 1
1996	The Burning Zone	The Chairman	Episode: "The Silent Tower"
1996	Bruno the Kid	Jarlesburg	Voice, episode: "The Adventure Begins"
1996	Spider-Man: The Animated Series	Baron Mordo	Voice, 3 episodes
1996	The Making of Disney's 'The Hunchback of Notre Dame'	Himself, Voice of Claude Frollo	
1996	Pinky and the Brain	Egyptian Priest	Voice, episode: "The Mummy"
1996–1997	Mighty Ducks	Wraith	Voice, 21 episodes
1996–1999	Jumanji	The Master of Jumanji	Voice
1996–1999	Timon & Pumbaa	Empress's Assistant, Jungle Inspector	Voice, 2 episodes
1996–2004	Hey Arnold!	Rex Smythe-Higgins, Voice in the Sky, Doctor	Voice, 5 episodes
1997	Doomsday: What Can We Do?	Narrator	Voice, TV documentary
1997	What If?	Narrator	Voice, TV documentary
1997	Puss in Boots	Narrator	Voice, television film
1997	Adventures from the Book of Virtues	King Darius	Voice, episode: "Faith "
1997	Extreme Ghostbusters	Maiikrob	Voice, episode: "Moby Ghost"
1998	Hollywood & Vinyl	Himself	1 episode
1998	Recess	King Arthur, Fence, St. Peter	Voice, episode: "The Lost Ball"
1998	Invasion America	The Dragit	Voice, 13 episodes
1999	Civil War Combat: America's Bloodiest Battles	Narrator	Voice, TV documentary, 2 episodes
1999	To Serve and Protect	Police Pathologist	
1999	Mickey Mouse Works	Ostrich	Voice, Episode #1.6
1999	Xyber 9: New Dawn	Machestro	Voice, 7 episodes
1999–2000	Johnny Bravo	King Brad, Announcer	Voice, 2 episodes
2000	UFOs: Then and Now?	Narrator	Voice, television film
2000	Buzz Lightyear of Star Command	Dr. Animus	Voice, 2 episodes
2000	The New Woody Woodpecker Show	Günther's Guardian	Voice, episode: "Be A Sport"
2001	Lloyd in Space	Dr. Werner Von Brain	Voice, episode: "Caution: Wormhole!"
2001	Providence	Unnamed	Episode: "Rule Number One"
2001	The Human Spinning-Top	The Worst Enemy	Voice
2001	The Legend of Tarzan	German Poacher	Voice, episode: "Tarzan and the Rift"
2001	ReBoot: My Two Bobs	Megabyte	Voice, television film
2001	The Gene Pool	Renfeld	Television film
2001–2002	House of Mouse	Magic Mirror, Shere Khan, Ostrich	Voice, 10 episodes
2003	Criss Angel: Supernatural	Narrator, voice – official trailer	Voice, television film
2003	Miss Spider's Sunny Patch Kids	Spiderus	Voice, television film
2003	Nostradamus: 500 Years Later	Nostradamus	Voice, documentary
2003	Civil War Combat: Culp's Hill at Gettysburg	Narrator	Voice, documentary
2003	Civil War Combat: The Battle of Chickamauga	Narrator	Voice, documentary
2004	UFO Files – UFOs: Then and Now? The Innocent Years	Narrator	Voice, 1 episode
2004	Teen Titans	Narrator	Voice, episode: "Transformation"
2004	Tom and Jerry – The Ultimate Classic Collection	Unknown	
2004–2007	Miss Spider's Sunny Patch Friends	Spiderus, Cloud King	Voice, 17 episodes Nominated—Annie Award for Best Voice Acting in a Feature Film
2005	Mickey's Around the World in 80 Days	Ostrich	
2005	Science of the Bible: Jesus, The Preacher	Himself, narrator	Voice, 1 episode
2005	H. H. Holmes: America's First Serial Killer	Narrator	Voice
2006	Me, Eloise	Gavin	Voice, episode: "Eloise in Springtime Part 1" (posthumous release)
2007	The History Channel Presents: The Civil War	Narrator (archival recordings)	Voice

=== Video games ===
Year	Title	Role	Notes
1992	King's Quest VI: Heir Today, Gone Tomorrow	Captain Saladin, Gate, Arch Druid	Voice
1996	Disney's Animated Storybook: The Hunchback of Notre Dame	Judge Claude Frollo	Voice
1996	Blood Omen: Legacy of Kain	Mortanius, William the Just, Dark Entity	Voice
1997	Fallout: A Post-Nuclear Role-Playing Game	The Lieutenant	Voice
1997	Rock & Roll Racing 2: Red Asphalt	Hellfalcon Advertisement Narrator	Voice
1997	Warcraft Adventures: Lord of the Clans	Drek'Thar	Voice
1998	Titanic Explorer	Capt. Smith, Sir Rufus Isaacs	Voice
1998	Die by the Sword	Rastegar, Grub	
1998	Reboot	Megabyte	Voice
1999	Legacy of Kain: Soul Reaver	Elder God, Zephon	Voice
1999	Planescape: Torment	The Transcendent One	Voice
1999	Y2K: The Game	Mister Leopard	Voice
2000	Forgotten Realms: Icewind Dale	Kresselack	Voice
2000	Sacrifice	Mithras	Voice
2001	The Jungle Book: Rhythm 'n Groove	Shere Khan	Voice
2001	Dopey's Wild Mine Ride	Magic Mirror	Voice
2001	Soul Reaver 2	Elder God	Voice
2001	Forgotten Realms: Baldur's Gate – Dark Alliance	Xantam The Beholder	Voice
2001	Star Trek: Armada II	USS Caddebostan Captain	Voice
2001	Return to Castle Wolfenstein	The Director	Voice, Uncredited
2002	Draconus: Cult of the Wyrm	Narrator	Voice, Uncredited
2002	Hunter: The Reckoning	Narrator	Voice
2003	Freelancer	Chancellor Florian Gustov Niemann	Voice
2003	Star Trek: Elite Force II	Archeopenda	Voice
2003	Lionheart: Legacy of the Crusader		Voice
2003	Armed & Dangerous	King	Voice
2003	Mace Griffin: Bounty Hunter	Leader of the Rangers	Voice
2003	Legacy of Kain: Defiance	Elder God	Voice
2004	X-Men Legends	Magneto	Voice
2004	Fallout: Brotherhood of Steel	Attis, narrator	Voice
2004	Champions of Norrath: Realms of EverQuest	Innorruk	Voice
2004	Galleon	Areliano, narrator	Voice
2004	The Bard's Tale	Narrator	Voice

=== Theme parks ===
Year	Title	Role	Notes
1992, 1998	Fantasmic!	Magical Mirror, Judge Claude Frollo	Voice

=== Audiobooks and audio plays ===
Audiobooks:

- 2005: Time's Fool: A Mystery of Shakespeare by Leonard Tourney. Reader. Blackstone Audio.
- 2006: The Castle of Otranto by Horace Walpole. Reader. Blackstone Audio.

Audio plays:

- 1998: The Cabinet of Dr. Caligari, winner of the Independent Publishers Award. Blackstone Audio. Cast member.

Radio serials:

- 1967–1976: The Sound of Darkness. Writer, Actor (voice).
- 1968–1972: Squad Cars. Actor, Announcer (voice).
- 1969–1972: Taxi! Writer. Red Kowalski (voice).
- 1971–1972: The Avengers. Announcer (voice), writer, Director.

=== Commercials ===
Media

- Batman & Mr. Freeze: SubZero.
- The Dark Crystal.
- London Broadcasting Company – voice-overs for the station's main jingle packages between 1974 and 1980.

Food

- Golden Grahams Treats (General Mills snack bar).

Toys

- The Empire Strikes Back (Kenner Products toys).
- Disney's Hercules.
- ReBoot (Irwin Toy).
- Return of the Jedi (Kenner Products toys).

Video games

- Dr. Mario.
- Kirby's Dream Land 2.
- Super Nintendo Entertainment System.
- X-Men 2: Clone Wars.

== Accolades ==
Award	Year	Category	Film	Result
Annie Awards
Annie Awards	2006	Best Voice Acting in an Animated Television Production	Miss Spider's Sunny Patch Friends	Nominated
Daytime Emmy Award	2006	Outstanding Performer in an Animated Program	Miss Spider's Sunny Patch Friends	Nominated
