= Jaga (Rajasthan) =

Jaga is an Indian caste group that held the traditional job of being genealogists of primarily Rajput, Gurjar and Meena families mainly in Rajasthan and surrounding states.
