= Jaggers =

Jaggers is a surname. Notable people with the surname include:

- Bobby Jaggers (1948–2012), American wrestler
- Orval Lee Jaggers (1916–2004), American Christian minister, writer, and scholar

== See also ==
- Great Expectations#Mr Jaggers and his circle
- Jagger
