= Basil Banghart =

American criminal, burglar and prison escape artist

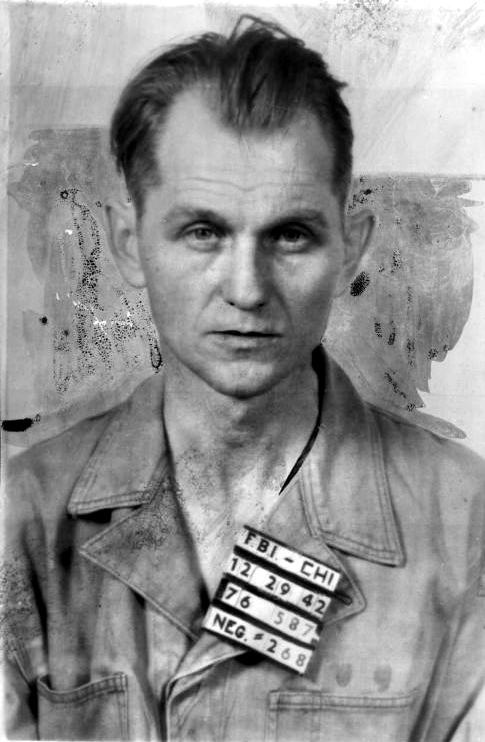
- FBI mugshot of Basil Banghart Jr
- Born: Basil Hugh Banghart; September 11, 1901; Berville, Michigan, U.S.
- Died: April 5, 1982 (aged 80); Los Angeles County, CA
- Other name: The Owl
- Occupation: Burglar
- Spouse: Mae Blacock
- Status: Released in 1960
- Conviction: Kidnapping
- Penalty: 99 years imprisonment

Basil Hugh "The Owl" Banghart Jr. (September 11, 1901– April 5, 1982) was an American criminal, burglar, and prison escape artist. Although a successful "stickup artist" during the 1920s and early 1930s, he is best remembered for his involvement in the hoax kidnapping of Chicago mobster Jake "the Barber" Factor, a crime for which Roger Touhy and he were eventually proven innocent after nearly 20 years in prison.

== Biography ==
=== Early life and criminal career ===
Basil Hugh Banghart was born in Berville, Michigan, in 1901. He dropped out of college after one year to become a professional car thief, stealing over 100 cars in the Detroit area before his arrest in 1926. Around this time, Banghart acquired his criminal nickname "The Owl" because of his abnormally large eyes.

Banghart escaped from Leavenworth Federal Penitentiary months into his sentence. Escaping from a window-washing detail, he leapt 25 feet from a window he was washing and over the prison's wall, escaping through the marsh on the other side. He got as far as Montana, but was recaptured and returned to prison. He made a second escape a year later, but was caught trying to steal a car in Pittsburgh in October 1928.

This time, Banghart was escorted back to prison by U.S. marshals. He was taken to a federal building, and left alone in an office for a few minutes, Banghart used a phone to call local police, claiming he was a federal agent who had been assaulted and overpowered by his prisoner, Basil Banghart. He continued claiming that "Banghart" had escaped after handcuffing him, and described the U.S. marshal who was escorting him, noting that he was "a dangerous, armed felon and a police impostor". When police arrived moments later, they took the escort into custody, while Banghart escaped in the confusion.

Banghart was arrested once more in February 1930, and was returned to Leavenworth, but quickly escaped again. He was arrested in Detroit for armed robbery in January 1932 and held in the South Bend, Indiana, jail, but escaped by throwing pepper in a guard's face, then using a machine gun to shoot his way out.

=== Banghart and the Roger Touhy gang ===
Banghart headed south and eventually made his way to Chicago, where he joined Roger Touhy's organization. Touhy, a veteran bootlegger from the days of Prohibition, was then in the midst of a fierce rivalry with Frank Nitti over labor racketeering. Banghart became a major asset to Touhy during this time, and no doubt an active participant in Touhy's war with the Chicago Outfit, but only one incident is recorded in which Banghart was specifically involved.

On January 31, 1933, Jimmy O'Brien was killed by Nitti's gunmen in front of the Garage Nightclub. O'Brien was one of Touhy's union men and one of the latest victims of the Touhy-Nitti feud. A week later, a man identified as Banghart returned to the nightclub, where he stepped out of a sedan and tossed a bomb through the front doors of the club. No one was injured, but the club itself was heavily damaged.

=== Involvement with the Factor kidnapping ===
When the Chicago Outfit staged the kidnapping of one of their own members, Jake "the Barber" Factor, in July 1933, it was expected to postpone his extradition to stand trial for fraud in Great Britain, as well as rid themselves of rival bootlegger Roger Touhy on whom the kidnapping would be blamed.

The members of the British consulate refused to believe the story, and won a judgment for Factor's extradition from the U.S. Supreme Court. In desperation, Factor and the Chicago mob sought to make the kidnapping more legitimate by arranging a pickup with the supposed kidnappers. Banghart and his partner Charles "Ice Wagon" Connors were brought into the plan at this point. Hired to be the "bagmen", they were told all they needed was to pick up the money, make it "look real", and they could keep the ransom money.

On August 15, the two showed up at the scheduled drop on Mannheim Road just outside the Chicago city limits. As soon as they arrived, they found 300 Chicago police officers and FBI agents waiting for them. To make matters worse, inside the ransom package was only $500. In spite of the obvious double cross, Banghart and Connors surprised everyone by escaping after a wild shootout.

=== Capture, trial and imprisonment ===
Despite being set up, Banghart and Connors did not seek revenge against the Chicago Outfit, and instead went on the run. On November 15, 1933, they teamed with Ike Costner and Ludwig "Dutch" Schmidt to hijack a U.S. mail truck of $105,000 in Charlotte, North Carolina. Banghart and Costner were eventually captured by the time the second trial for Factor's kidnapping was held on February 13, 1934. Facing long prison sentences for the Charlotte mail truck robbery, both men agreed to testify for the prosecution. Although Costner had not been involved in the ransom pickup, when Connors was found murdered on March 14, he took Connors' place and falsely stated that Banghart and he had been hired for the Factor kidnapping by Roger Touhy. When Banghart took the stand, however, he denied these claims and attempted to explain that the kidnapping was staged. Banghart's testimony was largely ignored, and Touhy, two others, and he were convicted and received 99-year sentences.

=== Escape with Touhy ===
After years of unsuccessful appeals, Banghart and Touhy escaped Joliet with Edward Derlack, Martlick Nelson, William Stewart, St. Clair McInerney, and James O'Connor on October 9, 1942. The FBI immediately joined the manhunt, justifying its involvement charging that the convicts had violated the federal draft law by not informing Selective Service of their change of address. Soon after their escape, Banghart and Touhy were suspected of taking part in a robbery at Melrose Park, Illinois, on December 19, which netted $20,000, although no charges were brought against them. McInerney and O'Connor were killed in a gun battle with federal agents less than two weeks after their escape, and the rest were captured at a nearby address on December 29, 1942. J. Edgar Hoover observed the raid and took part in what would be his last "personal arrest".

=== Release and later years ===
The convicts were given even longer jail sentences for their escape, and on January 2, 1943, Banghart was returned to Stateville, where he was placed in solitary confinement. He was then transferred, with an escort of 18 federal marshals, to Alcatraz. He spent the rest of his time in the prison kitchen working with former public enemy Alvin Karpis in the bakery. Jokingly referred to by inmates as the "Karpis kitchen crew", Banghart and Karpis allegedly learned to produce wine and other alcoholic beverages from cherry pie juices and other material in the kitchen. "The challenge was to avoid becoming an alcoholic," Karpis later wrote in his memoirs.

In 1954, a federal judge declared the Factor kidnapping a fraud and that Banghart and Touhy had most likely been wrongly convicted involving the Chicago Outfit and corrupt Chicago officials. Banghart was transferred back to Stateville in 1959, and eventually his kidnapping conviction was overturned and the mail robbery charges were dropped for time served. He was released the following year, when at age 60, he was reunited with his longtime girlfriend Mae Blacock. He had also received a small inheritance from his aunt 15 years before. Banghart retired to a small island in Puget Sound.
