= Charles Jaggard =

English cricketer (born 1973)

Charles Jaggard (born 22 May 1973) is an English former cricketer. He was a left-handed batsman who played for Buckinghamshire. He was born in Chalfont St. Peter.

Jaggard appeared in the Minor Counties Championship for the first time in 1995, and made a single List A appearance, against Essex in the NatWest Trophy in 1997. He scored 28 runs in the match.

Jaggard continued to play for Buckinghamshire until 1998.
