= Travel influencer =

Type of Internet celebrity

A travel influencer is an Internet celebrity that creates social media content about travel, tourism and culture, usually sharing their travel experiences. Their content is generally considered as a trusted source of knowledge, influencing their readers’ opinions and perceptions of places and experiences, affecting their travel decisions and “changing the way we think about the world”.

They often partner with airlines, travel agencies, tour companies and local businesses for the purpose of promoting their brand, product or services in return for a reward, usually involving free travel. Travel influencers generate income through brand co-operations and affiliate links. Many influencers, especially those working on Instagram, say brand sponsorships are their main source of income.

In 2019, influencer marketing became an industry worth around $6.5 billion. Almost half of marketers spent more than 20% of their budget on influencer posts. Influencer marketing – the business of brands paying social media celebrities to advertise their wares – had become a well-established marketing tactic.

== History ==
At the turn of the millennium travel blogs were typically created as a hobby by travel lovers, looking to record a favourite vacation, or report on upcoming travel trends. Internet developments soon allowed sophisticated bloggers to monetise their content, and with the advent of new social media platforms such as Instagram, Twitter, Facebook and YouTube, they were able to reach wider audiences. As readership and follower buy-in grew, instead of reporting on the latest travel trends, they came to set those trends, being regarded as an influential source of travelling information.

In 2017, Forbes compiled its first Top 10 travel influencers list. Forbes reported that the top 10 travel influencers had a total reach of 17,419,000 across social media.

=== Impact of the COVID-19 pandemic on travel influencers ===
Travel influencers suffered a significant loss of business during the COVID-19 pandemic. However, the increase in remote work gave readers more time to engage with the content of travel influencers.

== See also ==
- Influencer
- Travel documentary
- Travel literature
