= Federal Correctional Institution, Leavenworth =

Civilian federal prison in Leavenworth, Kansas

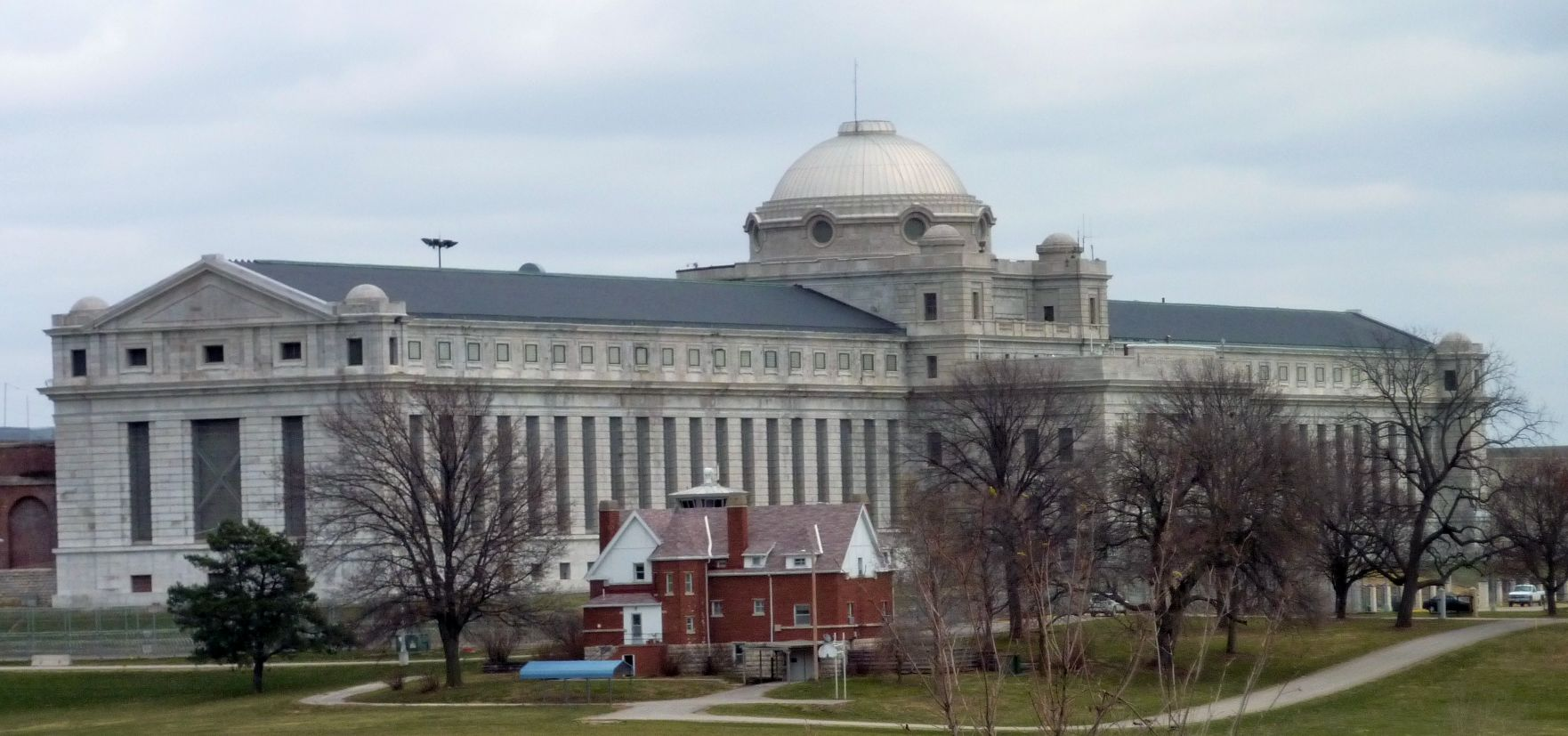
- Leavenworth in 2009
- Interactive map of Federal Correctional Institution, Leavenworth
- Location: Leavenworth, Kansas, U.S.; 39°19′48″N 94°56′11″W
- Status: Operational
- Security class: Medium-security (with minimum-security satellite camp)
- Population: 1,706 [1,579 at the FCI, 127 in prison camp] (September 2024; official BOP website)
- Opened: 1903
- Managed by: Federal Bureau of Prisons
- Warden: Crystal Carter
- Website: Official website

The Federal Correctional Institution, Leavenworth (previously the United States Penitentiary, Leavenworth) is a medium-security federal prison for male inmates in Leavenworth, northeast Kansas, United States. It is operated by the Federal Bureau of Prisons, a division of the United States Department of Justice. It also includes a satellite federal prison camp (FPC) for minimum-security male offenders.

FCI Leavenworth is located in Leavenworth, Kansas, which is 25 miles (40 km) northwest of Kansas City, Kansas.

== Background ==
FCI (formerly USP) Leavenworth, a civilian facility, is the oldest of three major prisons built on federal land in Leavenworth County, Kansas. It is separate from, but often confused with, the United States Disciplinary Barracks (USDB), a military facility located on the adjacent Fort Leavenworth army post. Located 4 miles (6.4 km) north of the FCI, the USDB is the sole maximum-security penal facility for the entire United States military. USP Leavenworth was the largest maximum-security federal prison in the United States from 1903 until 2005, when it was downgraded to a medium-security facility.

The former civilian penitentiary was built by prisoners from the original USDB. Additionally, the military's medium-security Midwest Joint Regional Correctional Facility (JRCF), located southwest of the new USDB, opened in 2010. The USDB and JRCF operate independently from FCI Leavenworth.

The prison has been profiled in The Hot House by Pete Earley, granted unlimited access, U.S. Penitentiary Leavenworth, a pictorial history by Kenneth M. LaMaster, the retired Institution Historian, and Leavenworth: Beginning to Bicentennial by J.H. Johnston III, a prominent member of the Leavenworth community.

== Design ==
USP Leavenworth was one of three first-generation federal prisons which were built in 1903. Prior to its construction, federal prisoners were held at state prisons. In 1895, Congress authorized the construction of the federal prison system.

The other two were Atlanta and McNeil Island (although McNeil dates to the 1870s, the major expansion did not occur until the early 1900s).

The prison follows a format popularized at the Auburn Correctional Facility in New York where the cell blocks were in a large rectangular building. The rectangular building was focused on indoor group labor with a staff continually patrolling.

The Auburn system was a marked difference from the earlier Pennsylvania plan popularized at Eastern State Penitentiary in which cell blocks radiated out from a central building and was the original design for the nearby Disciplinary Barracks before it was torn down and replaced by a totally new prison.

The St. Louis, Missouri architecture firm of Eames and Young designed both Leavenworth and the United States Penitentiary, Atlanta. Leavenworth's prison cells are back to back in the middle of the structure facing the walls. The prison's walls are 40 feet (12 m) high, 40 feet (12 m) below the surface and 3,030 feet (920 m) long and enclose 22.8 acres (92,000 m^{2}). Its domed main building was nicknamed the "Big Top" or "Big House." The domed Disciplinary Barracks two miles (3 km) to the north was nicknamed the "Little Top" until it was torn down in 2004 and replaced with a newer structure.

== Historical timeline ==
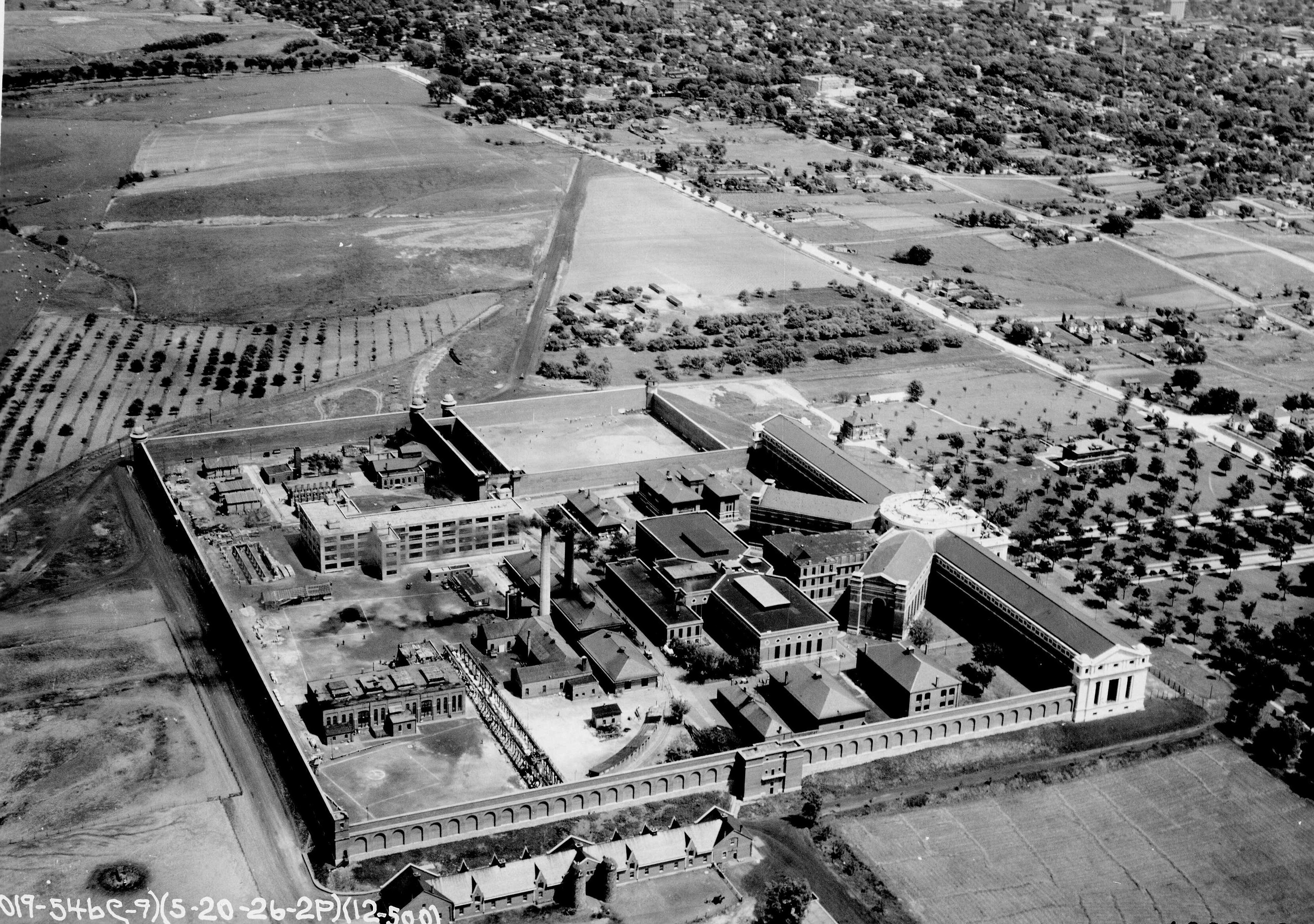
Aerial image, 1929

- 1827: Colonel Henry Leavenworth chose site for new fort.
- 1875: Fort chosen as the site for a military prison. Within a year, Fort Leavenworth housed more than 300 prisoners in a remodeled, supply-depot building.
- 1894: Secretary of War conceded to the House Appropriations Committee that War Department could do without the military prison.
- 1895 July 1: Congress transferred the military prison from the War Department to the US Department of Justice. The Department of Justice took over the plant and inaugurated the United States Penitentiary. Commandant of the military prison, James V. Pope. Warden of the USP, James W. French.
- 1896: House Judiciary Committee recommended that the facility be replaced.
- 1896 June 10: the Congress authorized a new federal penitentiary.
- 1897 March: Warden French marched prisoners every morning two and one-half miles (4 km) from Ft. Leavenworth to the new site of the federal penitentiary. Work went on for two and one-half decades.
- 1899 July 1: Robert W. McClaughry was appointed Leavenworth's second Warden.
- 1901 November 10: Joseph Waldrupe was the first correctional officer to be killed (records dating back to 1901) in the line of duty at Leavenworth.
- 1903: Enough space was under roof to permit the first 418 prisoners to move into the new federal penitentiary.
- 1904: First Cell house completed
- 1906 February 1: All prisoners had been transferred to the new facility, and the War Department appreciatively accepted the return of its prison.
- 1910 April 21: During construction, six prisoners escape by smashing through prison gates with a hijacked railroad locomotive but only one, Frank Grigware, eludes recapture.
- 1910 May: The Attorney General approved construction of a separate cellblock for females on the penitentiary grounds—this plan was later abandoned.
- 1913 June: T. W. Morgan, editor of a newspaper in the small Kansas town of Ottawa, was appointed Leavenworth's 3rd Warden.
- 1919: Construction of the cellblocks completed.
- 1926: Construction of the shoe shops completed.
- 1928: Construction of the brush and broom factory completed.
- 1929: Construction of the barber shop and first intraprison murder.
- 1930: In May, the Bureau of Prisons became a federal agency within the Department of Justice.
- 1930: On September 5, Carl Panzram becomes the first to be executed (records dating back to 1927) by hanging at Leavenworth.
- 1934: On December 11, President Franklin Roosevelt authorized the first federal prison industries as a public corporation.
- 1938: On August 12, Robert Suhay and Glenn Applegate become the first double execution (records dating back to 1927) by hanging at Leavenworth.
- 1944 to 1947: Japanese American conscientious objectors are held at Leavenworth after refusing military service in protest of the wartime incarceration of themselves and their families.
- 1980s and 1990s: The institution undergoes major renovations to three of its four cellhouses: A, B, and C. D-Cellhouse today remains the only cellblock true to its original design.
- 2005: Federal Bureau of Prisons changes USP Leavenworth's mission. The BOP decided to change the custody level of USP Leavenworth from High / Maximum to Medium while retaining the USP designation for historical reasons.
- 2011: The Federal Bureau of Prisons takes comments on a proposed new 1,500 medium security and 300 minimum security facility on the current prison grounds on 144 acres to the west of the current prison and a 238-acre area to the east.
- 2021: On December 15, USP Leavenworth began moving Inmates from the CCA facility in Leavenworth into housing units inside the walls. This would take a total for 5 days to complete. Pre-trial inmates replaced general population inmates in 3 of the housing units. USP- Leavenworth now houses Pre-trial inmates of all custody levels. USP-Leavenworth houses General Population Medium custody inmates & pre-trial (all custody) inside the main facility, with a Camp (minimum custody) inmate adjacent to the main facility.
- 2024: The institution was re-designated as Federal Correctional Institution Leavenworth so that the name is consistent with its security level.

== Notable escapees ==
Frank Grigware, imprisoned for train robbery, escaped from Leavenworth in 1910 with five other men by smashing through the prison gates with a hijacked supply locomotive. While the others were quickly recaptured, Grigware escaped to Canada. In 1916 he became the mayor of Spirit River, Alberta. He was discovered by the Royal Canadian Mounted Police and the FBI in 1933, but serious doubts about his original conviction led the U.S. to drop its extradition request in 1934. Grigware never returned to the U.S. and died in Alberta in 1977.

Basil Banghart escaped from Leavenworth three times. He escaped federal custody a fourth time while awaiting return to Leavenworth.

On December 11, 1931, seven inmates took Warden Thomas B. White hostage and escaped, aided by the well-known gangsters Frank Nash, George "Machine Gun" Kelly, and Thomas James Holden.

On March 12, 1989, bank robber Robert Alan Litchfield, who had a long history of escapes from custody, escaped by pretending to be a federal safety inspector and walking out the front doors of the institution.

== Executions ==
On September 5, 1930, serial killer Carl Panzram, under a federal death sentence for murder, was hanged at USP Leavenworth. On August 12, 1938, two men under the sentence of death for murder, Robert Suhay and Glenn Applegate, were hanged at USP Leavenworth.

== Cemetery ==
The penitentiary maintains a cemetery for deceased prisoners outside the walls of the prison.

== See also ==
- List of U.S. federal prisons
- Federal Bureau of Prisons
- Incarceration in the United States
