= List of inmates of Alcatraz Federal Penitentiary =

List of inmates held in Alcatraz Federal Penitentiary

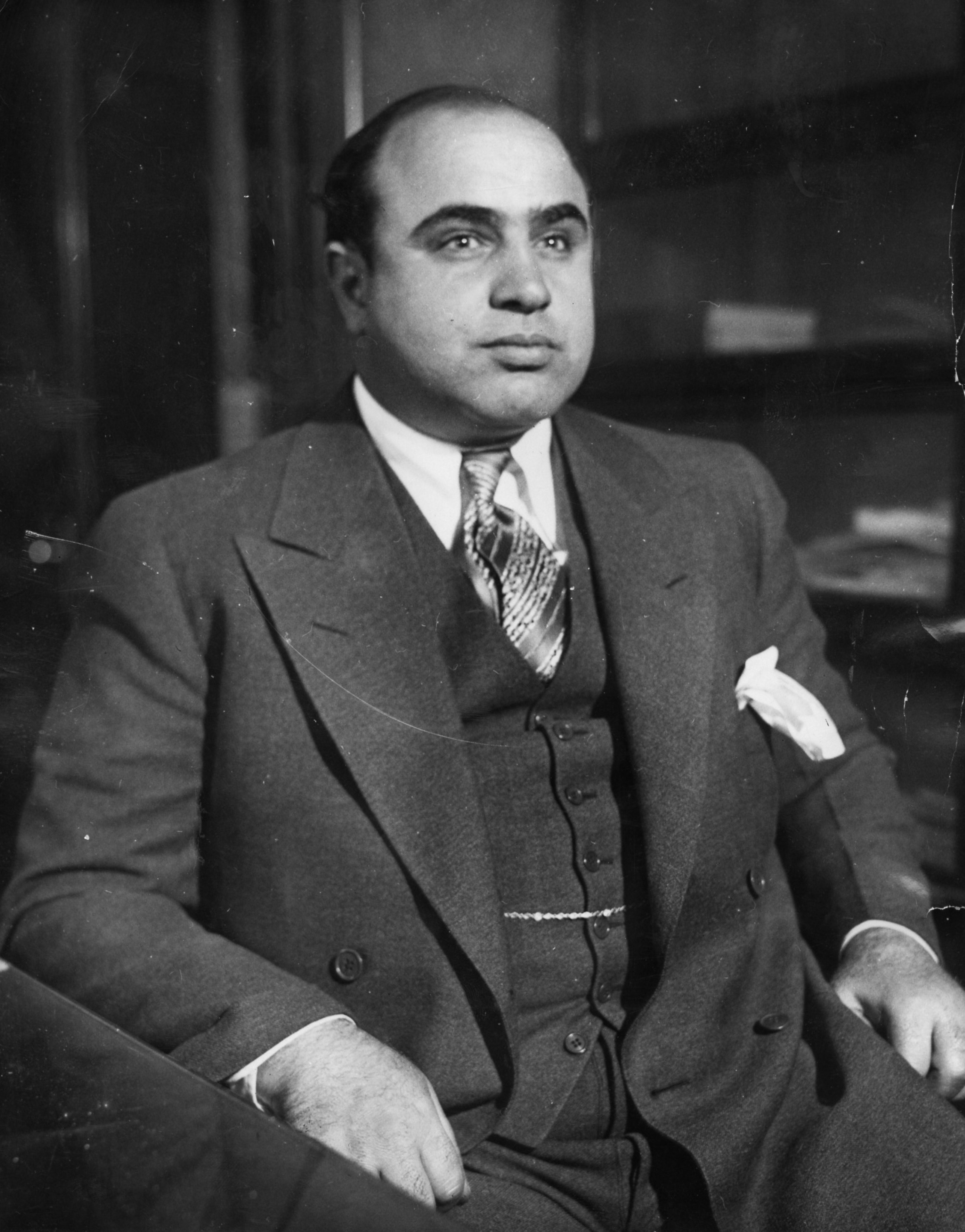
Al Capone

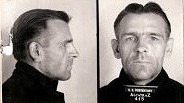
Bernard Coy

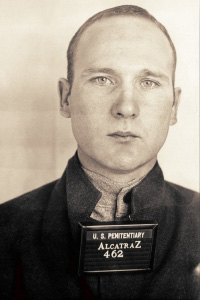
Sam Shockley

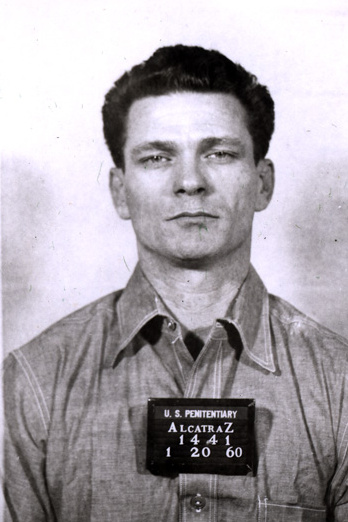
Frank Morris

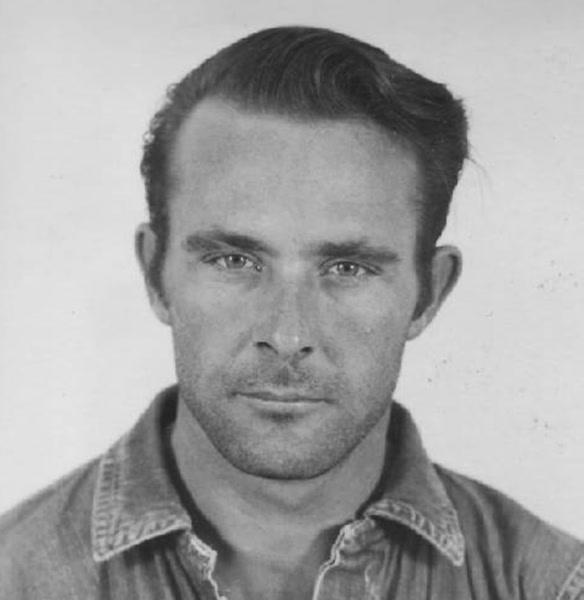
Clarence Anglin

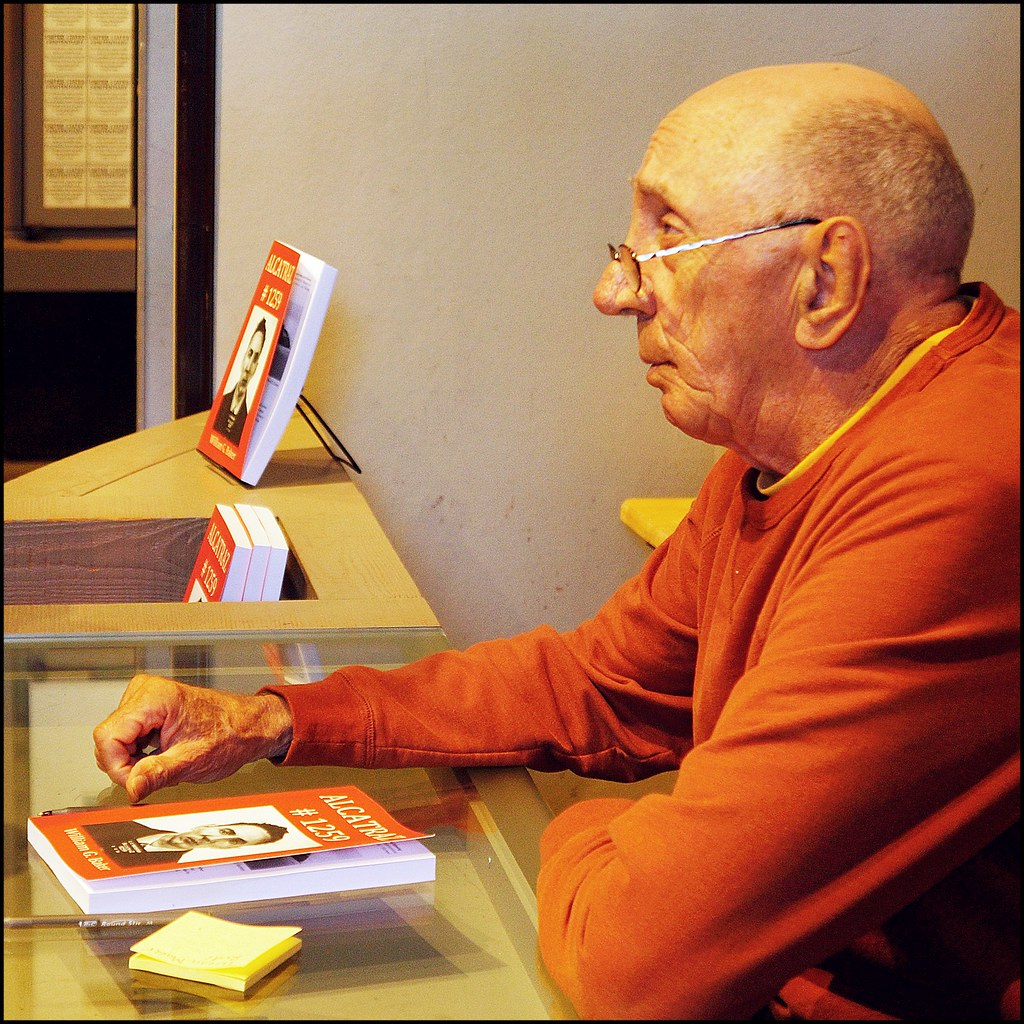
William G Baker

This is a list of notable inmates of Alcatraz Federal Penitentiary. An inmate register reveals that there were 1576 prisoners in total which were held at Alcatraz during its time as a Federal Penitentiary, between 1934 and 1963, although figures reported have varied and some have stated it to be 1557.

== List of notable prisoners ==
- Anglin Brothers and Frank Morris
- Harvey Bailey
- Eddie Bentz
- Basil "The Owl" Banghart
- Arthur "Doc" Barker
- Albert Bates
- James Boarman
- Miran Edgar Thompson
- Frankie Carbo
- Harvey Carignan
- John Paul Chase
- Edward Doll
- Erich Gimpel
- Ed Wutke
- Allen West
- John Allen Kendrick
- John Paul Scott
- Kurt Frederick Ludwig
- Verrill Rapp
- Roy "Smiling Bandit" Gardner
- Bernard "Barney" Coy
- Joseph "Dutch" Bowers
- Harold Brest
- Wilhelm von Brincken
- James "Whitey" Bulger
- Al "Scarface" Capone
- Clarence Carnes
- Meyer "Mickey" Cohen
- Theodore "Ted" Cole
- Joseph Paul "Dutch" Cretzer
- Volney "Curley" Davis
- Herbert Allen "Deafy" Farmer
- Rufus Franklin
- Floyd Hamilton
- Ellsworth Raymond "Bumpy" Johnson
- Alvin Francis "Creepy" Karpavicz
- Tomoya "Meatball" Kawakita
- George Kelly Barnes
- Thomas Robert Limerick
- James Crittenton Lucas
- John Knight Giles
- Roy Gardner
- Rufus McCain
- Rufe Persful
- Burton Phillips
- James John "Jim" Quillen
- Ralph Roe
- Harry Sawyer
- Sam Shockley
- Robert Simmons
- Morton Sobell
- Robert "Birdman of Alcatraz" Stroud
- James Edward Testerman
- Leon Warren "Whitey" Thompson
- Henri Young
- Irving "Waxey Gordon" Wexler
- Forrest "Woody" Tucker
- John Elgin Johnson
- Robert Victor Luke
