= List of Alcatraz escape attempts =

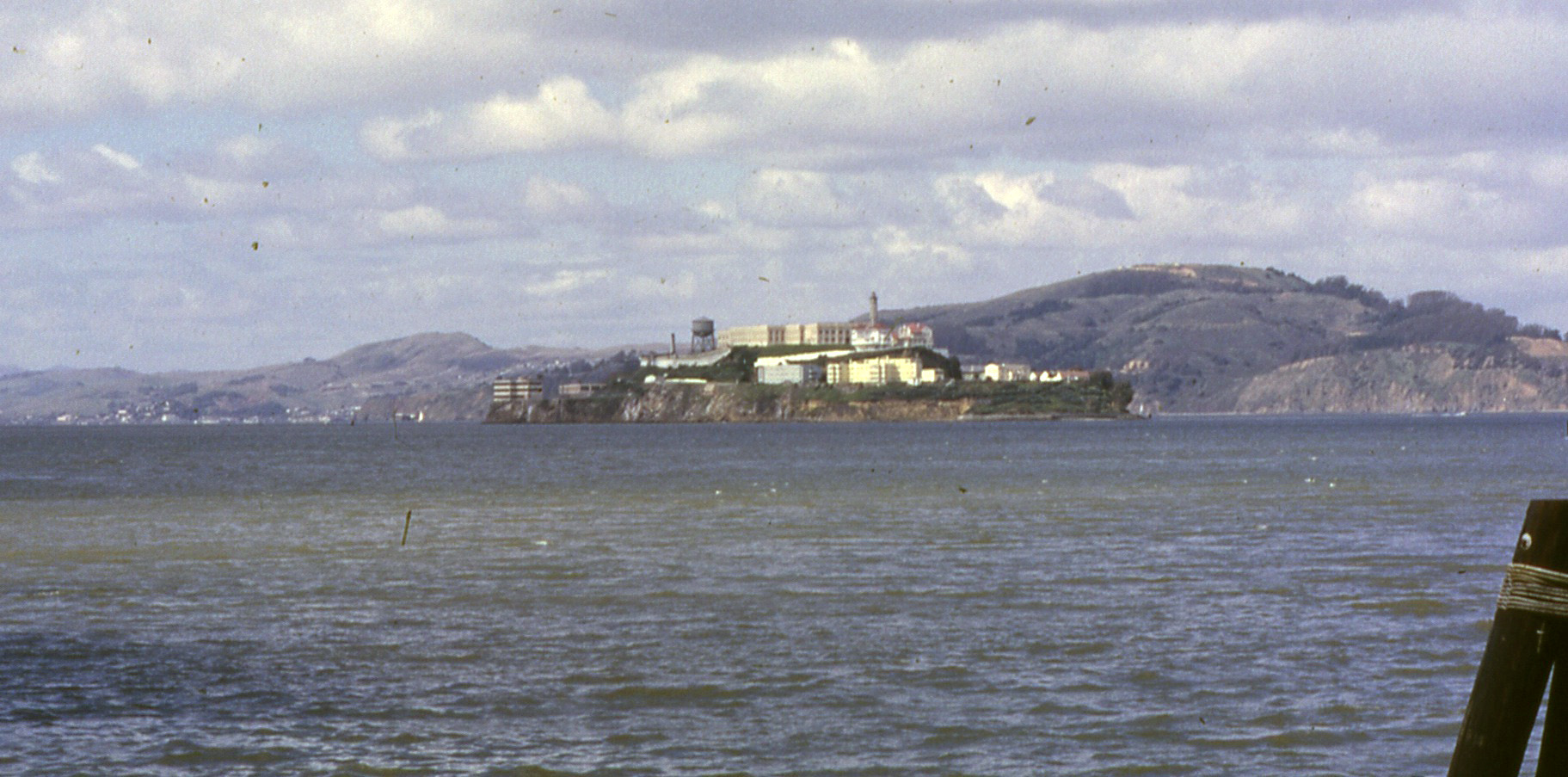
Alcatraz Island from San Francisco, March 1962

During its operation as a federal penitentiary from 1934 to 1963, there were a total of 14 escape attempts made by 34 prisoners, to escape Alcatraz Island in San Francisco Bay. Two men tried twice, making for a total of 36 individual escape attempts; fifteen were caught, eight gave up, six were shot and killed, two were drowned, and five were unaccounted for, though presumed drowned. Faced with high maintenance costs and a poor reputation, Alcatraz closed on March 21, 1963.

Most notable were the violent "Battle of Alcatraz" in May 1946 and the famous June 1962 escape by Frank Morris, John and Clarence Anglin, which was marked by careful planning and execution.

== Method ==
According to the prison's correctional officers, once a convict arrived on the Alcatraz wharf, his first thoughts were on how to leave. It had seemed impossible to escape from Alcatraz by swimming. The seasonal water temperature in the San Francisco Bay is about 53 °F (12 °C) in December and the current can exceed 6 knots. Citing these facts, as well as occasional visits from great white sharks and razor-sharp rocks, prison officers had discouraged most escape attempts.

== Attempted escapes ==
=== April 27, 1936 ===
On April 27, 1936, Joseph Bowers (Prisoner AZ210), who was assigned the duty of burning trash at the incinerator, was working burning garbage at the island's incinerator during duty hours when he suddenly ran and began scaling a chain link fence at the edge of the island in an apparent attempt to make for the shore. When Bowers refused orders of correctional officer E.F. Chandler located at the West Road guard tower to stop, Chandler fatally shot Bowers, who fell from over 15 m (50 ft).

The incident termed Bowers's "Desperate Escape" was variously deemed by inmates to have been an actual escape attempt, a deliberate suicide (Bowers had made multiple suicide attempts, and was deemed by some prisoners to be criminally insane), an attempt to climb up to grab garbage wedged in the chain link fence (Bowers was assigned to the garbage incinerator detail), or an attempt to climb the fence to feed a seagull. However, regardless of Bowers' initial motive, it is indisputable that he ignored Chandler's forceful signals to halt and kept climbing even after the guards began firing, such that he fell on the outside of the fence.

=== December 16, 1937 ===
Theodore Cole and Ralph Roe (Prisoners AZ258 and AZ260) had gradually filed through iron bars in the prison's mat shop in the industries building and escaped on a very foggy day, preventing them from being spotted by guards in the watch towers. The two jumped into the water and vanished. While officials were quick to conclude they likely drowned in the frigid waters, the fact the inmates got off Alcatraz and their bodies were never found made the incident the first to challenge Alcatraz's reputation as an "escape-proof" prison.

=== May 23, 1938 ===
Rufus Franklin (Prisoner AZ263), Thomas R. Limerick (Prisoner AZ335) and James C. Lucas (Prisoner AZ224) attacked and killed a guard named Royal Cline with a claw hammer in the woodwork shop in the industries building and then proceeded to the roof, where Officer Harold P. Stites shot Limerick, who later died, and Franklin, effectively ending the escape attempt. Lucas was eventually cornered and surrendered to the guards.

In November of 1938, Franklin and Lucas went on trial for the murder of Cline, where both prisoners received life sentences after a three-week trial.

=== January 13, 1939 ===
Arthur 'Doc' Barker, William Martin, Rufus McCain, Henri Young, and Dale Stamphill were inmates of the prison's supposedly most-secure unit, D-Block, when they managed to escape the cell house and reach the Alcatraz shore on the night of January 13, 1939 (Friday). As they were putting a makeshift raft together, they were spotted and fired on by a guard in a watch tower. Barker was mortally wounded, Stamphill was injured, and the others were sent to solitary confinement.

=== May 21, 1941 ===
Joe Cretzer, Sam Shockley, Arnold Kyle, and Lloyd Barkdoll were working in the industries area when they jumped the guards on duty and attempted to saw through window bars to reach the shore. The tool-proof bars foiled the attempt and they surrendered when this became apparent. Both Cretzer and Shockley would try to escape again in the Battle of Alcatraz.

=== September 15, 1941 ===
John Richard Bayless (May 16, 1915 – July 30, 1981) was working on the garbage detail and managed to elude the guards and reach the Alcatraz shore. He jumped into the water and tried swimming to San Francisco, but quickly gave up the attempt.

=== April 14, 1943 ===
James Boarman (January 1, 1919 – April 14, 1943), Harold Martin Brest (January 2, 1914 – May 31, 1979), Floyd Garland Hamilton (June 13, 1908 – July 24, 1984), and Fred John Hunter (October 13, 1899 – November 30, 1982), managed to cut window bars in the industries building's mat shop without being noticed and assemble four cans that contained army uniforms and could serve as flotation devices. They then overpowered two guards, bound and gagged them, and escaped out the window, leaving behind two of the four cans. One of these guards managed to get his whistle loose and the other managed to slip his gag and blow the first guard's whistle, alerting the tower guards, who opened fire on the prisoners.

Boarman was shot in the head. He was supported by Brest. As a prison launch picked up Brest, he let go of Boarman, who sank fast; his body was never recovered. Hunter, who had injured his back and hands in the escape attempt, gave up on swimming and sought refuge in a nearby cave. He was discovered two hours later as a result of bloodstains at the entrance of the cave; he surrendered after the guards fired a warning shot into the cave.

Hamilton was wrongly assumed by the guards to have been hit by gunfire and sunk (like Boarman), but he had actually been hiding in the same cave as Hunter under a pile of tires. Two days later he climbed back up the cliff and through the same window from which he had jumped, then hid under a pile of material in the storeroom. He was found there the next morning.

=== August 7, 1943 ===
Huron Ted Walters, who was serving a sentence of 30 years for robbery, assault, and auto theft, noticed that on weekends, fewer guards were on duty, and their attention tended to be focused on the recreation yard. On Saturday, August 7, he took advantage of the situation to slip out of the New Industries building, where he was working in the laundry. His plan was to cut through the two security fences that separated him from freedom, make his way to the water, and swim the 1.4 miles to San Francisco.

His plan went sideways early. The contraband wire cutters failed him, so he had to climb both fences, which cost him valuable time. Then, he fell from the second fence onto the rocks and injured his back. Although he made it to the island's shoreline, he could go no farther and was picked up by Captain of the Guards Henry Weinhold and Associate Warden E. J. Miller. He was returned to the cell house, where he spent some time in the prison hospital, then in solitary.

=== July 31, 1945 ===
John K. Giles, a prisoner working at the Alcatraz wharf, managed to assemble a U.S. Army technical sergeant's uniform (probably from pieces stolen from bags of army laundry sent to the island to be cleaned) and board a ferry that provided service among government facilities around San Francisco Bay. Shortly after the ferry's departure for Angel Island, headcounts on the Alcatraz wharf and aboard the ferry revealed the discrepancy, and Giles was apprehended at Angel Island and returned to Alcatraz.

=== May 2–4, 1946 ===
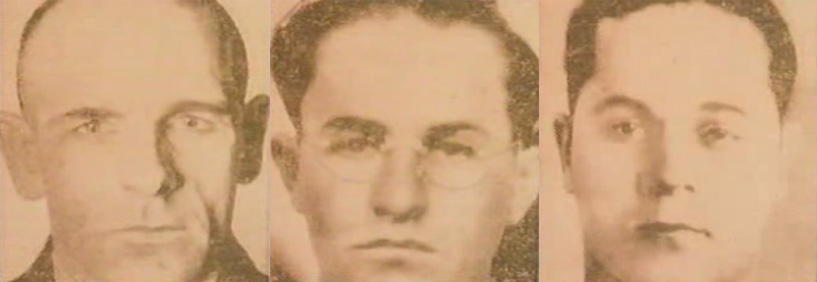
Bernard Coy, Marvin Hubbard and Joseph Cretzer were killed in the Battle of Alcatraz.

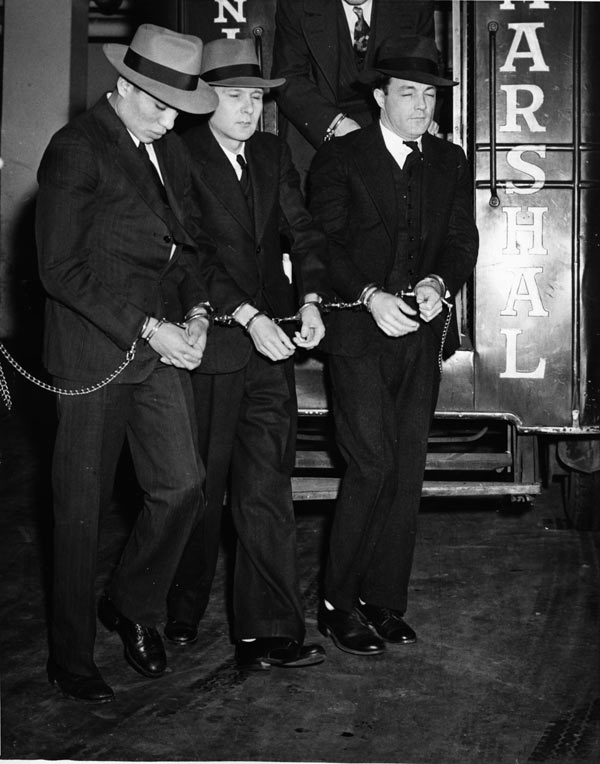
Carnes, Shockley and Thompson on way to court for trial in the Battle of Alcatraz

The most violent escape attempt occurred on May 2–4, 1946, when a failed attempt by six prisoners led to the Battle of Alcatraz, also known as the "Alcatraz Blastout". It was carried out by six prisoners: Bernard Coy, Joseph Cretzer, Sam Shockley, Clarence Carnes, Marvin Hubbard and Miran Thompson. They daringly took control of the cell house by overpowering correctional officers, and were able to enter the weapons room and obtain the keys to the recreation yard door.

Their aim was to escape by boat from the dock, but when they failed to obtain the keys to the outside door, they decided to battle it out. In the fight that ensued, they managed to hold hostage two correctional officers, whom they eventually killed after two days. Prompted by Shockley and Thompson, Cretzer shot the hostages at very close range. One of the guards, William Miller, succumbed to his injuries while the second guard, Harold Stites, was also killed in the cellhouse by friendly fire from outside. Although Shockley, Thompson, and Carnes returned to their cells, the other three, Coy, Cretzer and Hubbard, persisted with their fight.

The U.S. Marines intervened to help the correctional officers and killed the three prisoners. In this battle, apart from the guards and prisoners killed, 17 other guards and one prisoner were also injured. Shockley, Thompson, and Carnes were tried for the killing of the correctional officers. Shockley and Thompson were sentenced to death in the gas chamber, an action which was carried out at San Quentin in December 1948. Carnes, who was only 19 years old, was given a second life sentence.

=== July 23, 1956 ===
Floyd Wilson disappeared from his job at the dock but was discovered after hiding for 12 hours among large rocks along the shoreline after giving up on his plan to make a raft out of driftwood.

=== September 29, 1958 ===
Aaron Burgett and Clyde Johnson were working on the garbage detail when they overpowered Harold Miller, a guard. Both jumped into the water, trying to swim off the island. The two men attempted to use inflated plastic bags as flotation devices, and Burgett tied wooden boards to his feet to serve as swim fins. A police launch intercepted Johnson, standing waist deep in the bay, but Burgett had disappeared. Thirteen days later, Burgett's decomposed body was found floating in the bay near Alcatraz, confirming his drowning.

=== June 11, 1962 ===
Frank Morris, John Anglin and Clarence Anglin successfully carried out one of the most intricate escapes ever devised, on June 11, 1962. Behind the prisoners' cells in Cell Block B (where the escapees were interned) was an unguarded 3-foot (0.91 m) wide utility corridor. The prisoners chiseled away the moisture-damaged concrete from around an air vent leading to this corridor, using tools such as metal spoons and forks soldered with silver from a dime and an electric drill improvised from a stolen vacuum cleaner motor. The noise was disguised by accordions, played during music hour (about an hour and a half), and their progress was concealed by false walls, which, in the dark recesses of the cells, fooled the guards.

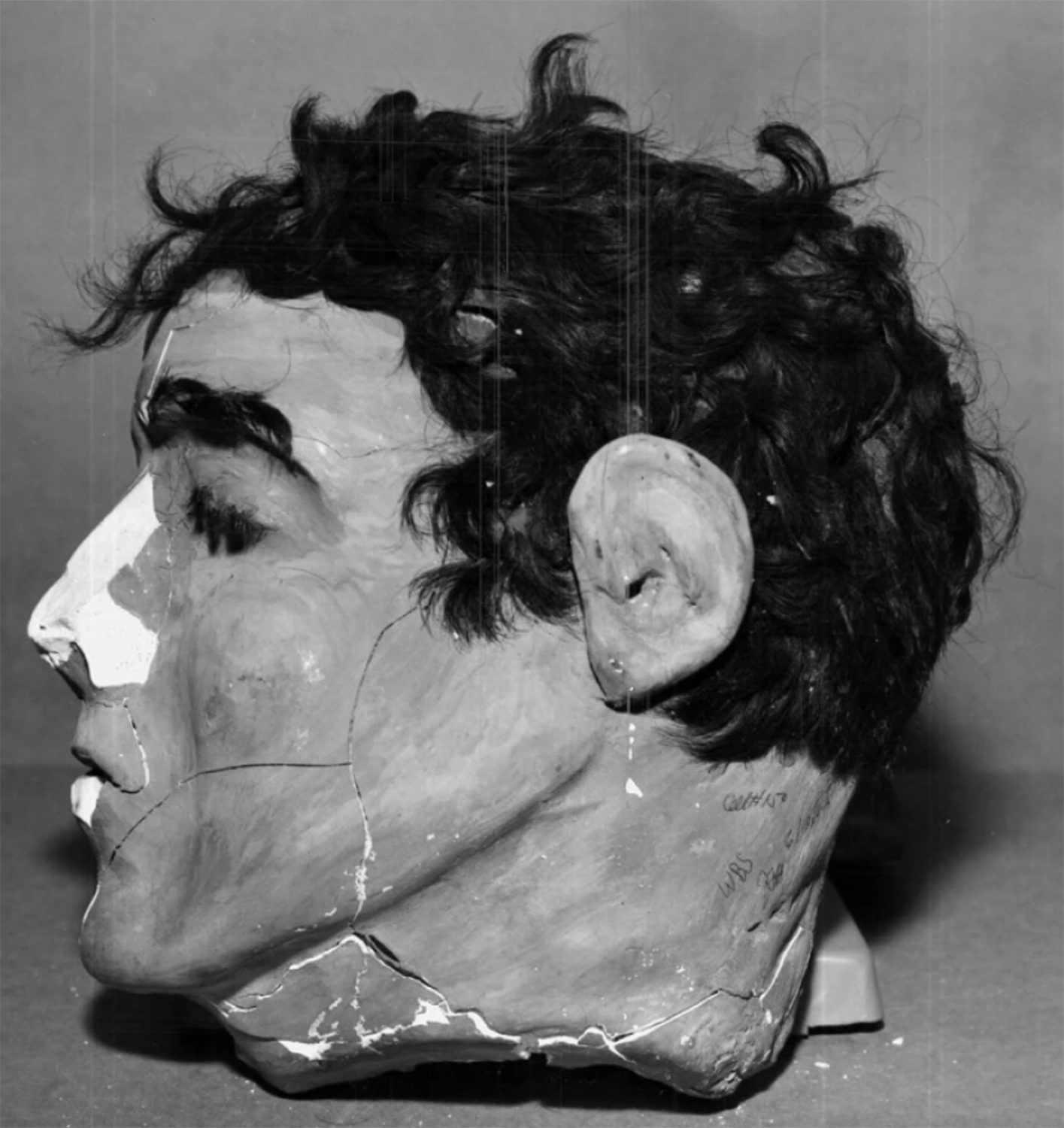
The dummy model head found in Frank Morris's cell

The escape route then led up through an air vent, a shaft large enough for a man to climb through. Stealing a carborundum cord from the prison workshop, the prisoners had removed the rivets from the grille and substituted dummy rivets made of soap. The escapees were given over 50 rubber raincoats from other inmates to use as a raft for the trip to the mainland, which they prepared on the top of the cellblock, concealed from the guards by sheets which had been put up over the sides. Leaving papier-mâché heads as decoys in their cell bunks, they escaped through a vent in the roof and departed Alcatraz on a makeshift raft.

The official investigation by the FBI was aided by another prisoner, Allen West, who also was part of the escapees' group but was left behind. West was unable to fit through his hole so he had to keep chipping to break through. When Morris and the Anglin brothers accelerated the schedule, West desperately chipped away at the wall; however, by the time he made it through the wall, his companions were gone. Hundreds of leads and theories have been pursued by the FBI and local law enforcement officials in the ensuing years, but no conclusive evidence has ever surfaced favoring the success or failure of the attempt.

The FBI's investigation from 1962 to December 1979 was finally treated as closed. The official report on the escape concludes that the prisoners likely drowned in the cold waters of the bay while trying to reach the mainland, it being unlikely that they made it the 1.25 miles to shore because of the strong ocean currents and the cold sea water temperatures of 50–55 degrees Fahrenheit (10–13 degrees Celsius).

The U.S. Marshals Service case file remains open and active, however. Morris and the Anglin brothers remain on its wanted list. In 2011, circumstantial evidence uncovered from contemporaneous documents and newspapers sparked conspiracy theories that the three men may have survived, indicating that contrary to the official FBI report of the escapees' raft never being recovered and no car thefts being reported, a raft was later discovered on nearby Angel Island with footprints leading away, and a car had been reported stolen after the escape by three men, who may have been Morris and the Anglins, and that officials may have engaged in a cover-up.

Dutch scientists who recreated the attempt in 2014 with computer models succeeded in reaching land."A Letter [Purporting to Be] from an Alcatraz Inmate May Give Insight to 1962 Escape". PBS. The Public Broadcasting Service. January 26, 2018. In 2015,relatives of the Anglin brothers presented further circumstantial evidence which appeared to support a longstanding rumor that the Anglin brothers had fled to South America following the escape; one notable circumstantial piece of evidence was a photograph alleged to be of John and Clarence Anglin in Brazil in 1975.

The incident was dramatized in Don Siegel's popular 1979 feature film Escape from Alcatraz.

=== December 16, 1962 ===
On December 16, 1962, John Paul Scott and Darl Lee Parker became the last two prisoners to attempt to escape from Alcatraz before its closure in the spring. Scott and Parker used a makeshift saw to cut through the bars on a kitchen window in the cell house, then ran to the edge of the island and jumped into the water. A prison launch found Parker alive 81 yards from the main island on the rock formation Little Alcatraz. Scott successfully swam 3 miles from Alcatraz Island and reached Fort Point beneath the Golden Gate Bridge, where he was found by teenagers, suffering from hypothermia and exhaustion. After recovering in Letterman General Hospital, he was returned to Alcatraz. Scott's feat is the only proven case of an Alcatraz inmate reaching the shore by swimming.

== Escape from Alcatraz (triathlon) ==
The Alcatraz–Fort Point route, which was swum by the inmate John Paul Scott in 1962, is part of two annual triathlon events.

== See also ==
- Escape from Alcatraz (1963 book)
- Escape from Alcatraz (1979 film)
- The Rock (1996 film)
