= Six Against the Rock =

1987 American television film

- Genre: Action; Crime; Drama; Thriller
- Based on: Six Against the Rock by Clark Howard
- Teleplay by: John Gay
- Directed by: Paul Wendkos
- Starring: David Carradine; Richard Dysart; Dennis Farina
- Music by: William Goldstein
- Country of origin: United States
- Original language: English

Production
- Executive producers: George Eckstein; Merrill H. Karpf
- Producer: Terry Carr
- Cinematography: Philip H. Lathrop
- Editors: Alan C. Marks; Rod Stephens
- Running time: 96 minutes
- Production company: Gaylord Productions (in association with) Schaefer/Karpf/Eckstein Production

Original release
- Network: NBC
- Release: May 18, 1987

Six Against the Rock is a 1987 American film on TV about the Battle of Alcatraz, based on Clark Howard's book about the aborted 1946 escape attempt.

== Cast ==
- David Carradine as Bernard Coy
- Howard Hesseman as Joseph "Dutch" Cretzer
- David Morse as Marvin Hubbard
- Charles Haid as Sam "Crazy Sam" Shockley
- Jan-Michael Vincent as Miran "Buddy" Thompson
- Paul Sanchez as Dan Durando
- Richard Dysart as Warden Johnston
- Dennis Farina as Robert Stroud / The Birdman of Alcatraz
- John Mahon as Officer Bill Miller
- J.P. Bumstead as Officer Cecil Corwin
- Tom Reese as Captain Weinhold
- Ian Patrick Williams as Lieutenant Bergen
