= Alcatraz: The Whole Shocking Story =

- Genre: Action; Crime; Drama
- Based on: Clarence Carnes (based on a story by); Don DeNevi (based on a story by)
- Written by: Ernest Tidyman
- Directed by: Paul Krasny
- Starring: Michael Beck; Art Carney; Alex Karras; Telly Savalas
- Theme music composer: Jerrold Immel
- Country of origin: United States
- Original language: English

Production
- Executive producer: Pierre Cossette
- Producers: James H. Brown; Ernest Tidyman
- Production locations: Alcatraz; San Francisco
- Cinematography: Robert B. Hauser
- Editors: Les Green; Donald R. Rode
- Running time: 196 min.
- Production company: Pierre Cossette Enterprises

Original release
- Network: NBC
- Release: July 10 – July 11, 1980

Alcatraz: The Whole Shocking Story is a 1980 American television film about Clarence Carnes, the youngest ever inmate of Alcatraz Prison. It screened over two nights, from Monday, July 10 to Tuesday, July 11 on NBC. It was written and co-produced by Ernest Tidyman.

== Plot ==
Part one details the early life and imprisonment of Clarence Carnes, climaxing with the Battle of Alcatraz. Part two focuses on Carnes as a veteran prisoner, His friendship with Robert Stroud, His involvement in the escape attempt of Frank Morris and the Anglin brothers.

== Cast ==
- Michael Beck as Clarence Carnes
- Art Carney as Robert Stroud
- Alex Karras as E.J. "Jughead" Miller
- Telly Savalas as Joseph Paul Cretzer
- Will Sampson as Clarence's Father
- Ronny Cox as Bernard Coy
- Richard Lynch as Sam Shockley
- Robert Davi as Hubbard
- John Amos as Ellsworth "Bumpy" Johnson
- James MacArthur as Walt Stomer
- Ed Lauter as Frank Morris
- Joe Pantoliano as Ray Neal
- Louis Giambalvo as Clarence Anglin
- Antony Ponzini as John Anglin
- Jeffrey Tambor as Dankworth
- Paul Mantee as Ordway

== Reproduction ==
The reproduction was partly short on location in Alcatraz.

== Reception ==
The Los Angeles Times called it "the prison story to end all prison stories".

The New York Times was harsher saying "ordinarily foolproof material is presented at such length that dramatic tension drains away... Mr. Beck is adequate... Mr. Savalas is almost the only member of the large cast who looks even a little like the sort of case-hardened criminals that used to end up at Alcatraz. The others look like tourists who caught the wrong ferry at Fisherman's Wharf... the writing... and the direction... are dedicated more to simplicity and economy than to drama."
