= Federal Kidnapping Act =

United States federal criminal law prohibiting kidnapping

- Other short titles: Lindbergh Law
- Long title: An Act forbidding the transportation of any person in interstate or foreign commerce, kidnapped, or otherwise unlawfully detained, and making such act a felony.
- Acronyms (colloquial): FKA
- Nicknames: Lindbergh Law
- Enacted by: the 72nd United States Congress
- Effective: June 22, 1932

Citations
- Public law: Pub. L. 72–189
- Statutes at Large: 47 Stat. 326

Codification
- Titles amended: 18 U.S.C.: Crimes and Criminal Procedure
- U.S.C. sections created: 18 U.S.C. ch. 55 § 1201 et seq.

Legislative history
- Introduced in the Senate as S. 1525 by Roscoe C. Patterson (R–MO) on June 3, 1932; Committee consideration by Senate Judiciary, House Judiciary; Passed the Senate on June 8, 1932 (Passed); Passed the House on June 17, 1932 (Passed); Signed into law by President Herbert Hoover on June 22, 1932

United States Supreme Court cases
- United States v. Jackson, 390 U.S. 570 (1968); Brady v. United States, 397 U.S. 742 (1970)

Following the Lindbergh kidnapping (the abduction and murder of Charles Lindbergh's toddler son), the United States Congress passed a federal kidnapping statute—known as the Federal Kidnapping Act, 18 U.S.C. § 1201(a)(1) (popularly known as the Lindbergh Law, or Little Lindbergh Law)—which was intended to let federal authorities step in and pursue kidnappers once they had crossed state lines with their victim.

== History ==
The act was first proposed in December 1931 by Missouri Senator Roscoe Conkling Patterson, who cited several recent kidnappings in Missouri and called for a federal solution. Initial resistance to his proposal was based on concerns over funding and state's rights.

Consideration of the law was revived after the kidnapping of Howard Woolverton in late January 1932. Woolverton's kidnapping featured prominently in several newspaper series researched and prepared in the weeks following his abduction, and were quite possibly inspired by it. Two such projects, by Bruce Catton of the Newspaper Enterprise Association and Fred Pasley of the Daily News of New York City, were ready for publication within a day or two of the Lindbergh kidnapping. Both series, which ran in papers across North America, described kidnapping as an existential threat to American life, a singular, growing crime wave in which no one was safe.

Following the discovery of Baby Lindbergh's body not far from his home, the act became law in summer 1932. In 1934, the act was amended to provide exception for parents who abduct their own minor children and made a death sentence possible in cases where the victim was not released unharmed.

The theory behind the Lindbergh Law was that federal law enforcement intervention was necessary because state and local law enforcement officers could not effectively pursue kidnappers across state lines. Since federal law enforcement, such as FBI agents and U.S. Marshals, have national law enforcement authority, Congress believed they could do a much more effective job of dealing with kidnappings than could state, county, and local authorities. There is a rebuttable presumption of transportation in interstate or foreign commerce if the victim is not released within 24 hours. Additionally, it is likewise an offense to conspire or attempt to violate the statute. There is also extraterritorial jurisdiction if the offense is against an internationally protected person.

Only one person, Arthur Gooch, was executed for a federal kidnapping conviction in a case where the victim did not die. Under the current statute, the victim must die for the crime to become a capital offense. Barring a permitted departure from federal guidelines, kidnapping resulting in death now carries a mandatory life sentence if the perpetrator is an adult. In addition, the law mandates a minimum of 20 years in prison if the victim is a minor and the perpetrator is an adult and not a family member.

Several states implemented their own versions of this law, known as "Little Lindbergh" laws, covering acts of kidnapping that did not cross state lines. In some states, if the victim was physically harmed in any manner, the crime qualified for capital punishment. This was what occurred in the Caryl Chessman case in California. Following the April 8, 1968 decision by the United States Supreme Court in United States v. Jackson, kidnapping alone no longer constitutes a capital offense.

== Notable convictions ==
- In what is considered the FBI's first major prosecution of the Act, George "Machine Gun Kelly" Barnes, his wife Kathryn Kelly, Albert L. Bates and others received life sentences for kidnapping Oklahoma oilman Charles F. Urschel in July 1933.
- Thomas Robert Limerick, sentenced to life in prison for 1935 for the kidnapping of three people during a bank robbery. He was killed during an escape attempt from the Alcatraz Federal Penitentiary in 1938.
- Arthur Gooch, executed in 1936 for the kidnapping of police officers R.N. Baker and H.R. Marks in Texas, before releasing them alive in Oklahoma. He is the only person executed for a federal kidnapping conviction in a case in which the victim(s) did not die. The crime became a capital offense when Baker was badly injured after being shoved into a glass case, which then broke. Gooch's accomplice, Ambrose Nix, was killed while resisting arrest on December 23, 1934.
- Samuel Shockley, sentenced to life in prison in 1938 for the kidnapping of Mr. and Mrs. D. F. Pendley during a bank robbery after the jury spared him from execution. He was later convicted of murder for his participation in the Battle of Alcatraz, sentenced to death, and executed in 1948.
- John Henry Seadlund, executed in 1938 for the kidnapping and murder of Charles Sherman Ross. Seadlund also murdered his accomplice in the kidnapping, James Atwood Gray.
- Clarence Carnes, sentenced to 99 years in prison in 1945 for the kidnapping of Jack Nance while he was a fugitive. At the time, he had been serving a life sentence for murder in Oklahoma. Carnes was later convicted of murder for his involvement in the Battle of Alcatraz and received another life sentence. He was the only surviving participant to be spared execution, after federal officers testified on his behalf, saying he had rejected orders to kill them. Carnes was paroled in 1973, but returned to prison for parole violations. He died in prison in 1988.
- Miran Edgar Thompson, sentenced to 99 years in prison in 1945 for the kidnapping of Betty Jim Shelton. He was sentenced to life in prison for a state murder conviction in Texas for killing a police officer after the jury spared him from execution. Thompson was later convicted of murder for his participation in the Battle of Alcatraz, sentenced to death, and executed in 1948.
- William Edward Cook, sentenced to 300 years in prison in 1951 after pleading guilty to the kidnapping and murder of a family of five, over the objections of the prosecution, who had wanted him executed. After learning that Cook would become eligible for parole in 20 years, the public demanded that he stand trial for another murder he committed in California. He was convicted of that murder, sentenced to death, and executed in 1952.
- Carl Austin Hall and Bonnie Emily Heady, executed in 1953 for the kidnapping and murder of Bobby Greenlease.
- George and Michael Krull, sentenced to life in prison in 1956 for the kidnapping and rape of Sunie Jones. They were also federally prosecuted for the rape since it occurred in a national park. The Krulls were both sentenced to death for rape and executed in 1957. These were the last non-military federal executions for rape in the United States.
- Walter Hill, sentenced to 25 years in prison in 1962 for the kidnapping and robbery of Arthur Phillips. Hill, who had a prior conviction for second degree murder, had his sentence extended by five years after being convicted of voluntary manslaughter for fatally stabbing a fellow inmate. Hill was paroled in 1975, and committed a triple murder in Alabama in 1977. He was sentenced to death in that case and executed in 1997.
- Melvin Rees, sentenced to life in prison in 1961 for the kidnapping and murder of Mildred Ann Jackson. Rees was also convicted in five murders in Maryland and Virginia, including that of Jackson. He was sentenced to life in prison in Maryland and sentenced to death in Virginia, but was not executed due to his mental incapacity to assist in his own defense. Rees's sentence was commuted to life in prison in 1972 and he died in prison in 1995.
- Victor Feguer, executed in 1963 for the kidnapping and murder of Doctor Edward Bartels.
- Richard Frederick Dixon, sentenced to 40 years in prison in 1977 for the hijacking of Eastern Airlines Flight 953. Dixon also received a life sentence in state court for the murder of a police officer in Michigan. He was paroled in 2021 and is now serving his federal sentence.
- Robert Lee Willie and Joseph Vaccaro, sentenced to life in prison in 1980 for the kidnapping and attempted murder of Mark Allen Brewster, and the kidnapping and rape of Debbie Cuevas. Willie and Vaccaro were later sentenced to death and life in prison, respectively, for a state murder conviction in Louisiana. Willie was executed in 1984.
- Ming Sen Shiue, sentenced to life in prison in 1980 for the kidnapping and rape of Mary Stauffer, and the kidnapping of her daughter, Elizabeth. He was denied mandatory release and declared a dangerous sexual predator in 2010.
- Alton Coleman and Debra Brown, serial killers each sentenced to 20 years in prison in 1985 for kidnapping Oline Carmical. Coleman and Brown were later sentenced to death for state murder convictions. Coleman received death sentences in Ohio, Indiana, and Illinois, and Brown received death sentences in Ohio and Indiana. Coleman was executed in Ohio in 2002. Brown later had her death sentences in Ohio and Indiana commuted to life in prison and 140 years, respectively.
- Andrew Six and his uncle, Donald Petary, were both convicted of kidnapping 12-year-old Kathy Allen from Iowa and later murdered her in Missouri, and sentenced to 200 years' imprisonment in 1987. Six and Petary were both later sentenced to death for a state murder conviction in Missouri. Six was executed in 1997 and Petary died on death row in 1998.
- Genaro Ruiz Camacho, sentenced to life in prison in 1991 for the kidnapping and murder of Evellyn Banks and her son, Andre Banks. Camacho was later sentenced to death for a state murder conviction in Texas and executed in 1998.
- Donald Leroy Evans, serial killer sentenced to life in prison in 1991 for the kidnapping, rape, and murder of Beatrice Louise Routh. Evans was later sentenced to death for a state murder conviction in Mississippi. He was stabbed to death by a fellow death row inmate in 1999.
- Larry Hall, suspected serial killer sentenced to life in prison in 1995 for the kidnapping and murder of 16-year-old Jessica Roach. Hall is suspected of dozens of murders in multiple states.
- Christian Velez, Tony Estevez, and Miguel Grullon, sentenced to prison terms ranging from 17 to 30 years in 1998 for their roles in the kidnapping and murder of Nelson G. Gross.
- Alfonso Rodriguez Jr., sentenced to death in 2007 for the kidnapping, rape, and murder of Dru Sjodin. His death sentence was overturned in 2021 and he was resentenced to life in prison in 2023.
- James Ford Seale, sentenced to life in prison in 2007 for the kidnapping and murder of two young black men as a Ku Klux Klan member in 1964. Died in prison in 2011.
- Brian David Mitchell and Wanda Barzee, sentenced to life in prison and 15 years, respectively, for kidnapping and repeatedly raping 14-year-old Elizabeth Smart while holding her in captivity for approximately nine months.
- Annugetta Pettway, sentenced to 11 years in prison in 2012 after pleading guilty to kidnapping Carlina White as an infant and raising her as her own child. Released from prison in 2021.
- Joseph Edward Duncan, serial killer sentenced to death in 2008 for the kidnapping, rape, and murder of Dylan Groene. Duncan died on death row in 2021 before he could be executed.
- Brendt Allen Christensen, sentenced to life in prison in 2019 for the kidnapping, rape, and murder of Yingying Zhang, after a jury spared him from execution.
- Wesley Ira Purkey, executed in 2020 for the kidnapping, rape, and murder of Jennifer Long.
- Keith Dwayne Nelson, executed in 2020 for the kidnapping, rape, and murder of Pamela Butler.
- Orlando Cordia Hall, Bruce Carneil Webster, Demetrius Kenyon Hall, Steven Christopher Beckley, and Marvin Terrance Holloway, prosecuted for the kidnapping, rape, and murder of Lisa Rene. Orlando Hall, the ringleader, was executed in 2020, and Bruce Webster had his death sentence commuted to life in prison in 2019 after he was found to be intellectually disabled. Demetrius Hall, Steven Beckley, and Marvin Holloway all pleaded guilty and received prison sentences ranging from 15 to 30 years. Beckley pleaded guilty to kidnapping resulting in death, but avoided a life sentence after being granted special reductions for substantial assistance with the investigation.
- Lisa Marie Montgomery, executed in 2021 for the kidnapping of Bobbie Jo Stinnett's unborn child. Montgomery cut the baby out of Stinnett's womb and left Stinnett to die.
- Javier Enrique Da Silva Rojas, sentenced to 30 years in prison in 2021 after pleading guilty to the kidnapping and murder of his ex-girlfriend, Valerie Reyes, by stuffing her in a suitcase, causing her to suffocate.
- Thomas Steven Sanders, who was convicted of kidnapping and murdering 12-year-old Lexis Roberts, who was forcibly abducted and taken across state lines from Arizona to Louisiana, where her murder took place in 2010. Sanders was sentenced to death by a federal jury in 2014, but his sentence was commuted to life without parole in 2024 after outgoing President Joe Biden granted clemency to him and another 36 inmates on federal death row. Sanders still faces state charges for killing Roberts in Louisiana, in addition to state level charges in Arizona for killing Roberts's mother Suellen Roberts.
