= Salvo =

Simultaneous discharge of weaponry

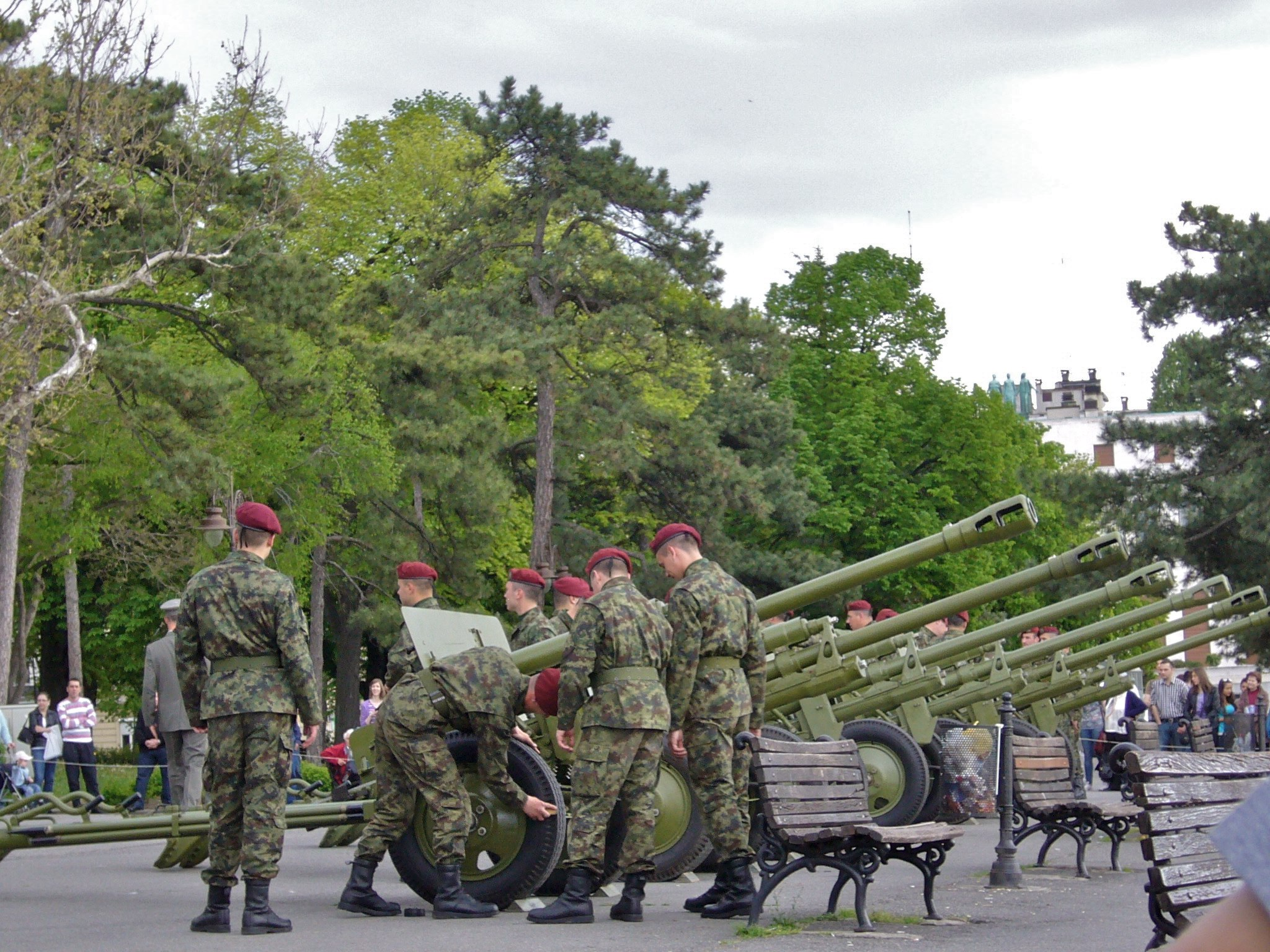
Salvo at Belgrade fortress

A salvo is the simultaneous discharge of artillery or firearms including the firing of guns either to hit a target or to perform a salute. As a tactic in warfare, the intent is to cripple an enemy in many blows at once and prevent them from fighting back.

== Overview ==
Troops armed with muzzleloaders required time to reload their arms with gunpowder and shot. Gun drills were designed to enable an almost continuous rain of fire on the enemy by lining troops into ranks, allowing one rank to fire a salvo, or volley, while the other ranks prepared their guns for firing.

The term is commonly used to describe the firing of broadsides by warships, especially battleships. During fleet engagements in the days of sail, from 17th century until the 19th century, ships of the line were maneuvered with the objective of bringing the greatest possible number of cannons to bear on the enemy and to discharge them in a salvo, causing enough damage and confusion as to allow time for the cannon to be swabbed out and reloaded. Crossing the T entailed cutting across the enemy's line of battle to enable broadsides to be fired through the enemy's bow or stern along the whole length of the ship, with every shot likely to cause the maximum carnage. The opportunity was a passing one and the most had to be made of it.

With the coming of HMS Dreadnought, with her turreted main armament, the heavy guns were directed by firing a salvo of half-broadside in order to observe the fall of shot, allowing enough time to adjust for range and direction before firing the other half-broadside. This way, shells were kept in flight while each half-battery was reloaded. Reloading a battleship's guns, arriving at a firing solution and lining the guns up to fire took as long as 30 seconds, especially when the fall of shot needed to be observed and corrections made before firing again. A target ship moving at 18 knots (33 km/h) traveled 0.15 nautical miles (0.28 km) in 30 seconds, and would often maneuver to "spoil" the range measurement. The "spread" of the salvo would have one shot fire "over" the estimated range, one shot "under", and two on the estimated range. When a four-shot "salvo" "straddled" the target with one splashing over, one splashing under and two landing on or near the target, fire control officers knew they had the correct range. All turret-mounted guns on battleships and cruisers were directed by the gunnery officer, positioned high in the ship and equipped with a visual rangefinder and other mechanisms for directing fire. Instructions to the gunlayers in the turrets were passed by voice pipe, messenger and, later, by telephone. Guns could also be laid by remote control by the gunnery director, with the appropriate technology. Late in World War II, guns were directed by radar.

== See also ==
- List of multiple-barrel firearms
- Barrage (artillery)
- Broadside
- Fusillade
- Volley fire
- Gast Gun
- Meroka CIWS
- Metal Storm Limited
- MRSI
- Nordenfelt gun
- Project SALVO
- Volley gun
