= Gas chamber =

Sealed room into which gas is pumped in, causing death by poisoning or asphyxiation

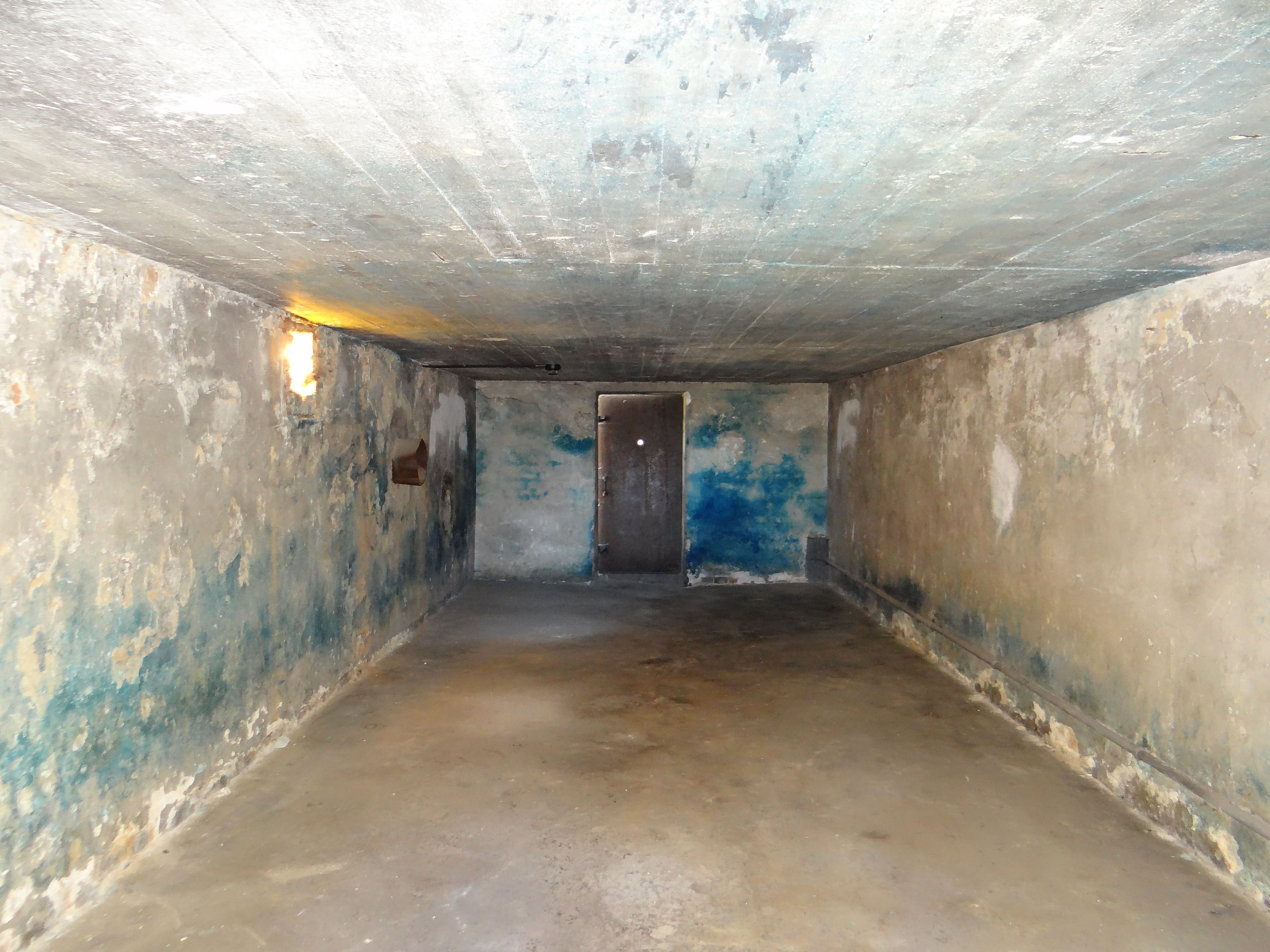
Gas chamber at Majdanek concentration camp near Lublin

A gas chamber is an apparatus for killing humans or animals with gas, consisting of a sealed chamber into which a poisonous or asphyxiant gas is introduced. Poisonous agents used include hydrogen cyanide and carbon monoxide. High concentration carbon dioxide is typically used in gas chambers for animals today.

== History ==
Early gas chambers were used to kill stray animals. In 1874, a London pound used a CO_{2} gas chamber to kill dogs; a decade later, Sir Benjamin Ward Richardson made a version from wood and glass large enough to hold a Saint Bernard, for "the humane slaughter of dogs and cats".

In America, the utilization of a gas chamber for humans was first proposed by Allan McLane Hamilton to the state of Nevada. Since then, gas chambers have been used as a method of execution of condemned prisoners in the United States and continue to be a legal execution method in three states, seeing legislated reintroduction with inert N_{2}, although redundant in practice since the early 1990s. Lithuania used gas chambers for civilian, penal use in the 1930s, with the last known execution carried out in 1940. None of these saw mass use, however, and were strictly for "criminal" purposes.

Most notably, during the Holocaust large-scale gas chambers designed for mass killing were used by Nazi Germany from the late 1930s, as part of the Aktion T4, and later for its genocide program.

More recently, escapees from North Korea have alleged executions to have been performed by gas chamber in prison camps, often combined with medical experimentation.

== Nazi Germany ==
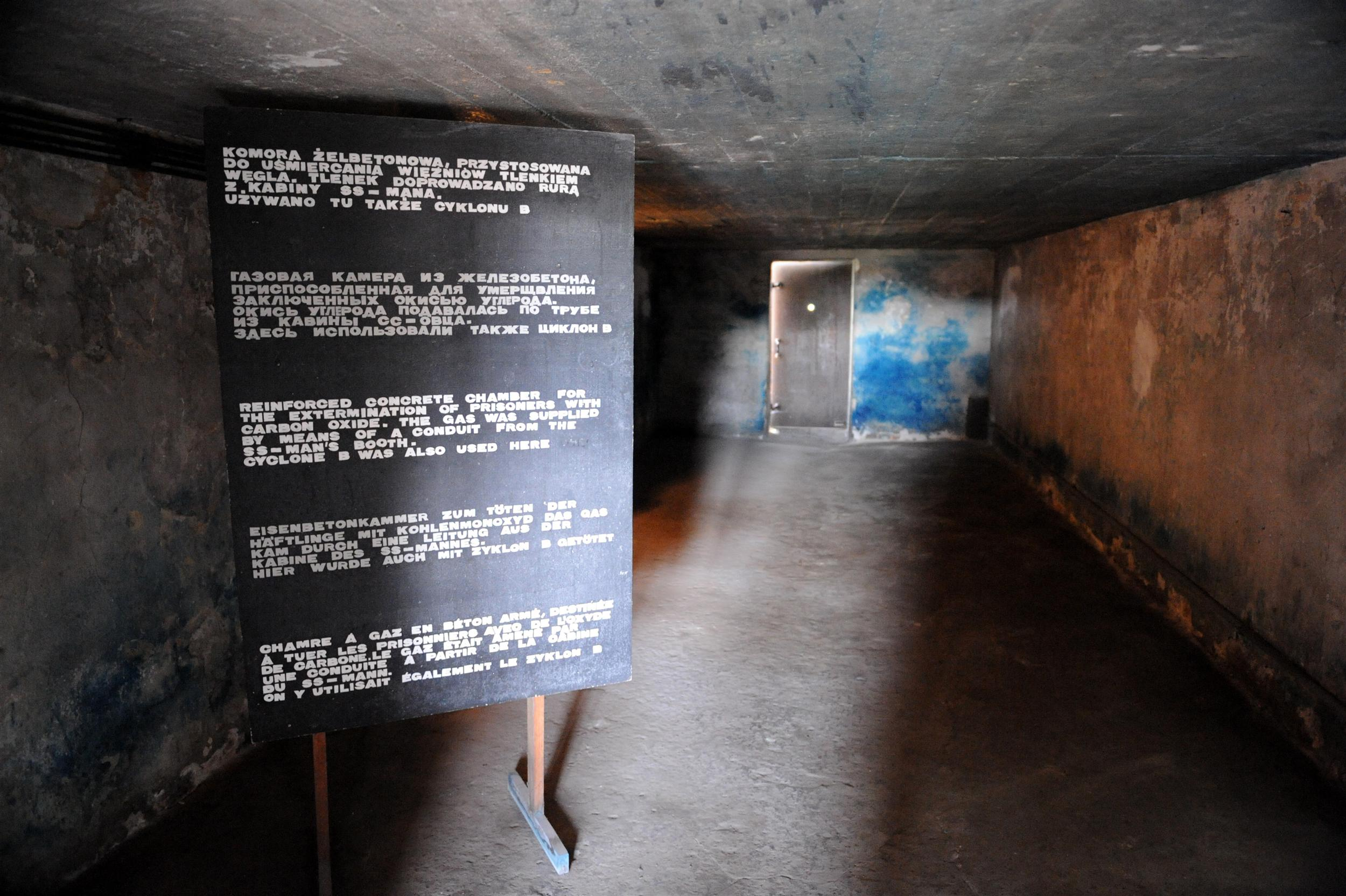
Interior of Majdanek gas chamber, showing Prussian blue residue

Nazi Germany made extensive use of various types of gas chambers for mass-murder during the Holocaust.

Beginning in 1939, gas chambers were used as part of Aktion T4, an "involuntary euthanasia" program under which the Nazis murdered people with physical and intellectual disabilities, whom the Nazis considered "unworthy of life". Experiments in the gassing of patients were conducted in October 1939 in occupied Poznań in Poland. Hundreds of prisoners were murdered by carbon monoxide poisoning in an improvised gas chamber. In 1940, gas chambers using bottled pure carbon monoxide were established at six killing centres in Germany. In addition to persons with disabilities, these centres were also used during Action 14f13 to murder prisoners transferred from concentration camps in Germany, Austria, and Poland. Concentration camp inmates continued to be murdered even after the euthanasia program was officially shut down in 1941.

During the invasion of the Soviet Union, mass executions by exhaust gas were performed by Einsatzgruppen using gas vans, trucks modified to divert engine exhaust into a sealed interior gas chamber.

Starting in 1941, gas chambers were used at extermination camps in Poland for the mass-murder of Jews, Roma, and other victims of the Holocaust. Gas vans were used at the Chełmno extermination camp. The Operation Reinhard extermination camps at Belzec, Sobibor, and Treblinka used exhaust fumes from stationary diesel engines.

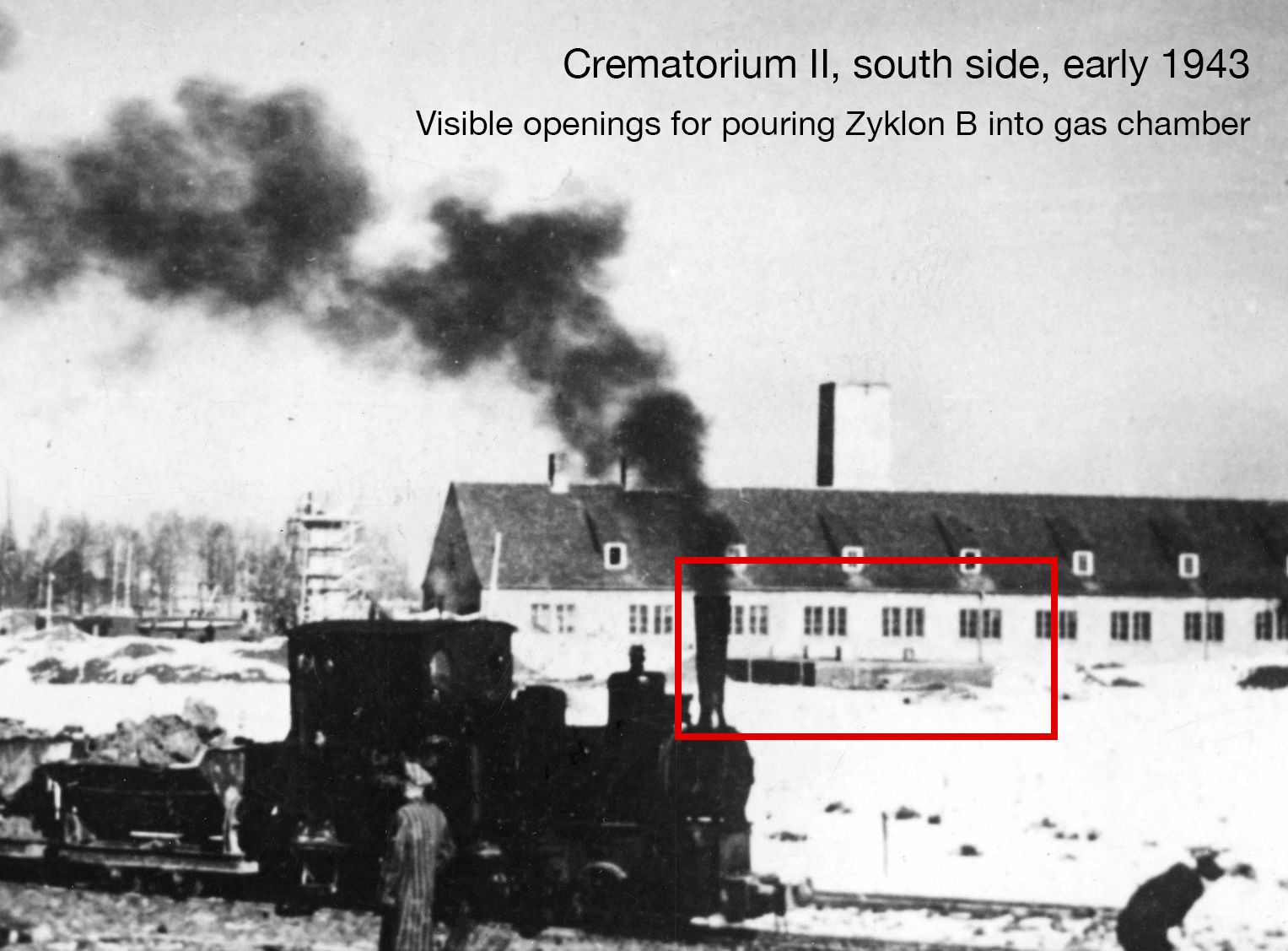
The openings through which Zyklon B was poured into the gas chamber of crematorium II at Auschwitz Birkenau are visible in this February 1943 photo, taken by SS Dietrich Kammann. Poles Ludwik Lawin and Taduesz Kubik, who worked in the camp photography studio, stole a number of Kammann's negatives and buried them.

In search of more efficient killing methods, the Nazis experimented with using the hydrogen cyanide-based fumigant Zyklon B at the Auschwitz concentration camp. This method was adopted for mass-murder at the Auschwitz and Majdanek camps. Up to 6,000 victims were gassed with Zyklon B each day at Auschwitz.

Most extermination camp gas chambers were dismantled or destroyed in the last months of World War II as Soviet troops approached, except for those at Dachau, Sachsenhausen and Majdanek. One destroyed gas chamber at Auschwitz was reconstructed after the war to stand as a memorial.

== North Korea ==
Kwon Hyuk, a former head of security at Camp 22, described laboratories equipped with gas chambers for suffocation gas experiments, in which three or four people, normally a family, are the experimental subjects. After the chambers are sealed and poison is injected through a tube, while scientists observe from above through glass. In a report reminiscent of an earlier account of a family of seven, Kwon claims to have watched one family of two parents, a son and a daughter die from suffocating gas, with the parents trying to save the children using mouth-to-mouth resuscitation for as long as they had the strength. Kwon's testimony was supported by documents from Camp 22 describing the transfer of prisoners designated for the experiments. The documents were identified as genuine by Kim Sang Hun, a London-based expert on Korea and human rights activist.

== Lithuania ==
In 1937–1940, Lithuania operated a gas chamber in Aleksotas within the First Fort of the Kaunas Fortress. Previous executions were carried out by hanging or by shooting. However, these methods were viewed as brutal and in January 1937, the criminal code was amended to provide execution by gas which at the time was viewed as more civilized and humane. Lithuania considered and rejected execution by poison. Unlike the American or German model the Lithuanian gas chamber, built out of bricks, worked by inputting compressed lethal gas from an external storage cylinder (Černevičiūtė 2014). The first execution was carried on July 27, 1937: Bronius Pogužinskas, age 37, convicted of murder of five people from a Jewish family. Historian Sigita Černevičiūtė counted at least nine executions in the gas chamber, though records are incomplete and fragmentary. Of the nine, eight were convicted of murder. One of these, Aleksandras Maurušaitis, was also convicted of anti-government actions during the 1935 Suvalkija strike. The last known execution took place on May 19, 1940, for robbery. The fate of the gas chamber after the occupation by the Soviet Union in June 1940 is unclear.

== Soviet Union ==
As historian Robert Gellately pointed out, "the Soviets sometimes used a gas van (dushegubka), as in Moscow during the 1930s [...], but had no gas chambers." In interrogations in the late 1930s, NKVD officers had testified that special trucks called "soul takers" (dushegubki) were supposed to carry prisoners to their executions but instead gassed them on their way by channeling exhaust fumes into the compartment where the prisoners were held. Author Tomasz Kizny assumes that they were in use while NKVD officer Isai Berg oversaw the executions at Butovo (October 1937 to 4 August 1938). Berg is quoted that "there was no other way to execute so many people". According to yet another contemporary this was only a precautionary method aimed at preventing riots. Historian Igal Halfin notes, that execution by gas is never mentioned in other Soviet sources, and it contradicts the Soviet practice of individualized executions.

== United States ==
Gas chamber usage in the United States. Secondary method only Previously used, but not presently Never used

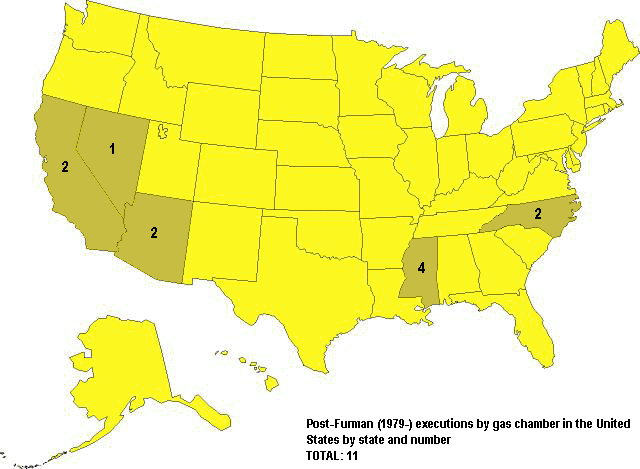
Post-Furman uses by state and numbers

Gas chambers have been used for capital punishment in the United States to execute death row inmates. The first person to be executed in the United States by lethal gas was Gee Jon, on February 8, 1924. An unsuccessful attempt to pump poison gas directly into his cell at Nevada State Prison led to the development of the first makeshift gas chamber to carry out Jon's death sentence.

On December 3, 1948, Miran Thompson and Sam Shockley were executed in the gas chamber at San Quentin State Prison for their role in the Battle of Alcatraz.

In 1957, Burton Abbott was executed as the governor of California, Goodwin J. Knight, was on the telephone to stay the execution.

The last gas chamber execution was carried out in Missouri on February 26, 1965, when Lloyd Leo Anderson was put to death for the murder of a 15-year-old drugstore delivery boy during a 1961 drugstore robbery in St. Louis, Missouri. The state signed legislation to switch to lethal injection before it resumed executions in 1989, starting with the execution of George Mercer.

Since the restoration of the death penalty in the United States in 1976, 11 executions by gas chamber have been conducted. Four were conducted in Mississippi, 2 in Arizona, 2 in California, 2 in North Carolina, and 1 in Nevada. The first execution via gas chamber since the restoration of the death penalty was in Nevada in 1979, when Jesse Bishop was executed for murder. The most recent execution via gas chamber was in 1999. By the 1980s, reports of suffering during gas chamber executions had led to controversy over the use of this method.

At the September 2, 1983, execution of Jimmy Lee Gray in Mississippi, officials cleared the viewing room after 8 minutes while Gray was still alive and gasping for air. The decision to clear the room while he was still alive was criticized by his attorney. In 2007, David Bruck, an attorney specializing in death penalty cases, said, "Jimmy Lee Gray died banging his head against a steel pole in the gas chamber while reporters counted his moans."

During the April 6, 1992, execution of Donald Eugene Harding in Arizona, it took 11 minutes for death to occur. The prison warden stated that he would quit if required to conduct another gas chamber execution. Following Harding's execution, Arizona voted that all persons condemned to death after November 1992 would be executed by lethal injection.

Following the execution of Robert Alton Harris in 1992, a federal court declared that "execution by lethal gas under the California protocol is unconstitutionally cruel and unusual." However, this decision was vacated after California amended its statute to allow death row inmates to choose between lethal injection and the gas chamber. By the late 20th century, most states had switched to methods considered to be more humane, such as lethal injection. California's gas chamber at San Quentin State Prison was converted to an execution chamber for lethal injection.

As of 2020, the last person to be executed in the gas chamber was German national Walter LaGrand, sentenced to death before 1992, who was executed in Arizona on March 3, 1999. The U.S. Court of Appeals for the Ninth Circuit had ruled that he could not be executed by gas chamber, but the decision was overturned by the United States Supreme Court. The gas chamber was formerly used in Colorado, Maryland, Nevada, New Mexico, North Carolina and Oregon. Seven states (Alabama, Arizona, California, Mississippi, Missouri, Oklahoma, and Wyoming) authorize lethal gas if lethal injection cannot be administered, the condemned committed their crime before a certain date, or the condemned chooses to die in the gas chamber. Alabama, Mississippi, and Oklahoma specify the nitrogen hypoxia method, Arizona specifies the hydrogen cyanide method, and the other states do not specify the type of gas. In October 2010, Governor of New York David Paterson signed a bill rendering gas chambers illegal for use by humane societies and other animal shelters.

== Animal slaughter ==
Gas chambers are used in the slaughter process of animals, particularly pigs and chickens. The gas chambers are used on groups of animals reducing the need to handle each animal individually, and is relatively inexpensive when applied at scale.

In slaughterhouses in the UK, pigs must be killed by the gas in the chamber. In other countries, pigs may be stunned using the gas chamber first. While unconscious, the pigs are then killed with a sharp knife outside of the gas chamber.

In 2024 in England and Wales, 90% of pigs killed in a slaughterhouse were stunned with this high concentration CO_{2} method. Chickens, both broiler (77%) and spent egg laying hens (99%), are also frequently stunned in slaughterhouse gas chambers, with a lower CO_{2} mixture.

=== Chamber design ===
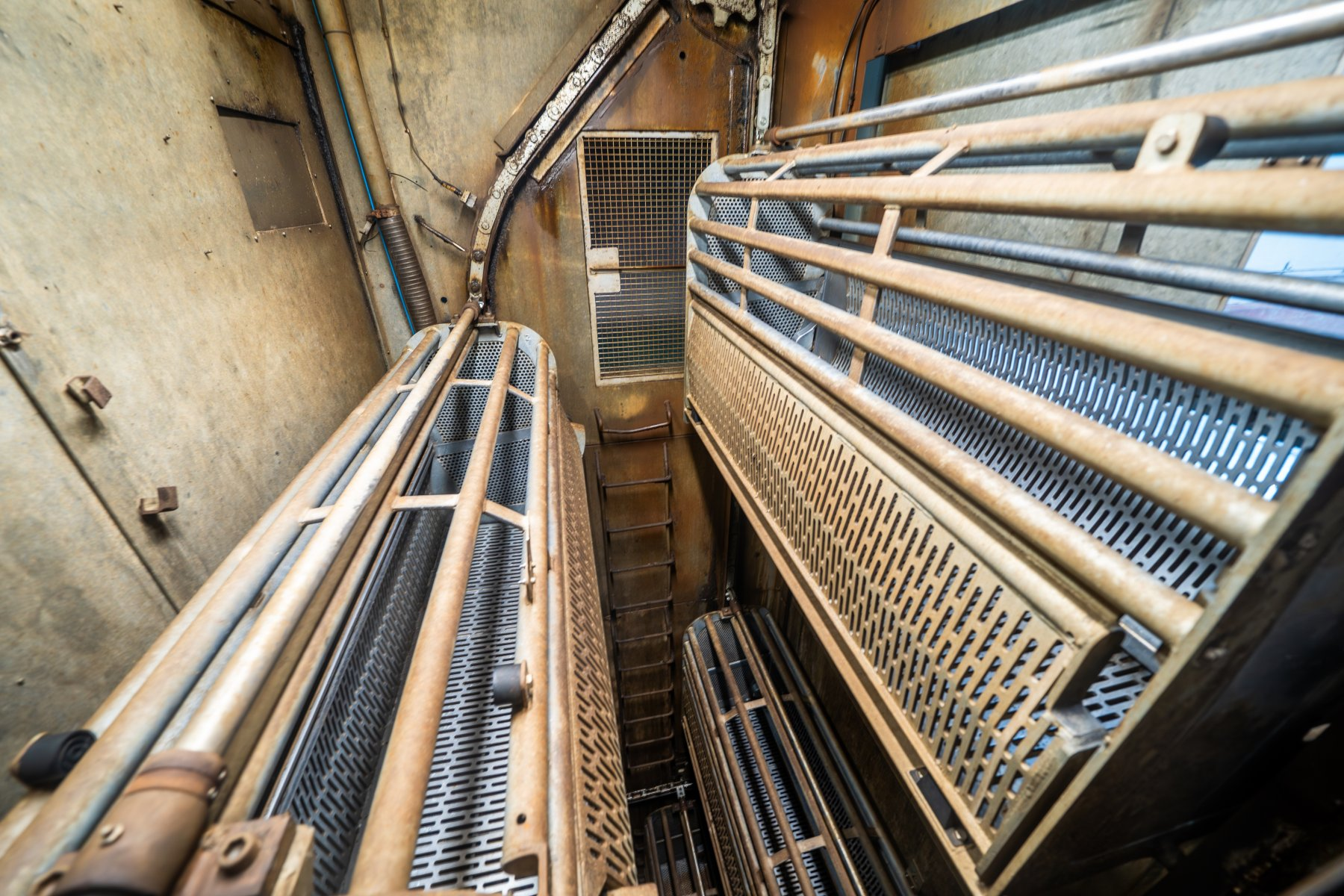
Pig CO_{2} gas chamber using the Paternoster system. The gondolas are empty. CO_{2} levels increase the lower down the pit the gondolas move.

For pigs, the paternoster system is often used. The main feature is a 4 to 8 meter deep pit which holds the high concentration CO_{2}. Because CO_{2} is heavier than air, this stays in the pit even when the top is open. Pigs are led to the top of the pit where they are sent into gondolas either in single file or in groups. Each gondola holds 2 to 8 pigs, depending on the installation and individual pig size. With the pigs in it, the gondola closes, and then descends. The CO_{2} concentration increases the lower the gondola descends. When the gondola has spent sufficient time at the high CO_{2} concentration, it ascends again on the other side of the pit, with now stunned or dead pigs. When the gondola reaches the top again, it empties its pigs for them being killed (if needed) and further processing. Finally, it moves to the other side of the pit, where it can be loaded again. Multiple gondolas are used in the paternoster setup. An alternative is a dip-lift system, this utilizes a single gondola going down and up again in a similar pit design.

For poultry, different designs can be used, all a version of Controlled Atmosphere Stunning (CAS). In the EU, a tunnel design is most common, followed by a closed cabinet and then a pit design. With tunnels and pits, poultry is moved in from one entrance, and exposed to increasing CO_{2} gas concentration, before reaching the end stunned or killed. In a cabinet design, the poultry is loaded into the gas chamber which is then sealed and filled with CO_{2} for one batch at the time. A benefit of CAS systems compared to electrical water bath stunning, the most common method, is that the birds can stay in their transport crates, or do not have to be handled by humans to load them into system.

=== Animal welfare concerns ===
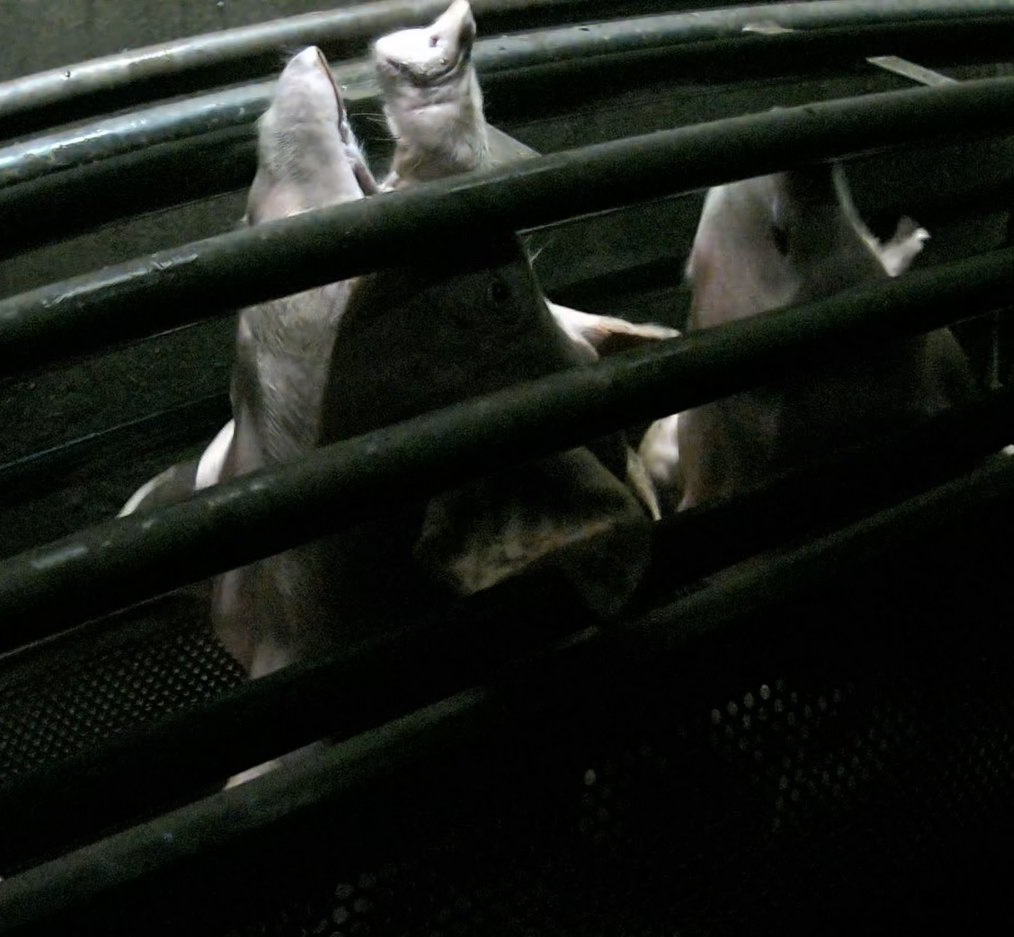
Pigs in a gas chamber gondola, showing their adverse reaction to the high concentration CO_{2} gas

The high concentration CO_{2} gas typically used is highly aversive and painful, and still takes at 47-60 seconds on average to stun pigs in test conditions. The pain and distress of high CO_{2} concentrations is caused by irritation of mucous membranes such as the eyes, mouth and airways, and causes pigs to show adverse behaviours such as gasping, vocalization, and trying to escape. For these reasons, the European Food Safety Authority concluded that CO_{2} stunning is not optimal from an animal welfare perspective.

Alternatives using inert gas instead of high concentration gas have been successfully tested. Argon was found to be most promising, as the pigs' aversion to the gas was strongly reduced, retrofitting existing gas chambers is possible, and relatively quick. However this method takes longer, raising costs per pig 2-3 fold compared to high concentration CO_{2}, and meat quality differed between trials, having higher numbers of blood spots.

== Method of use ==
=== Using hydrogen cyanide ===
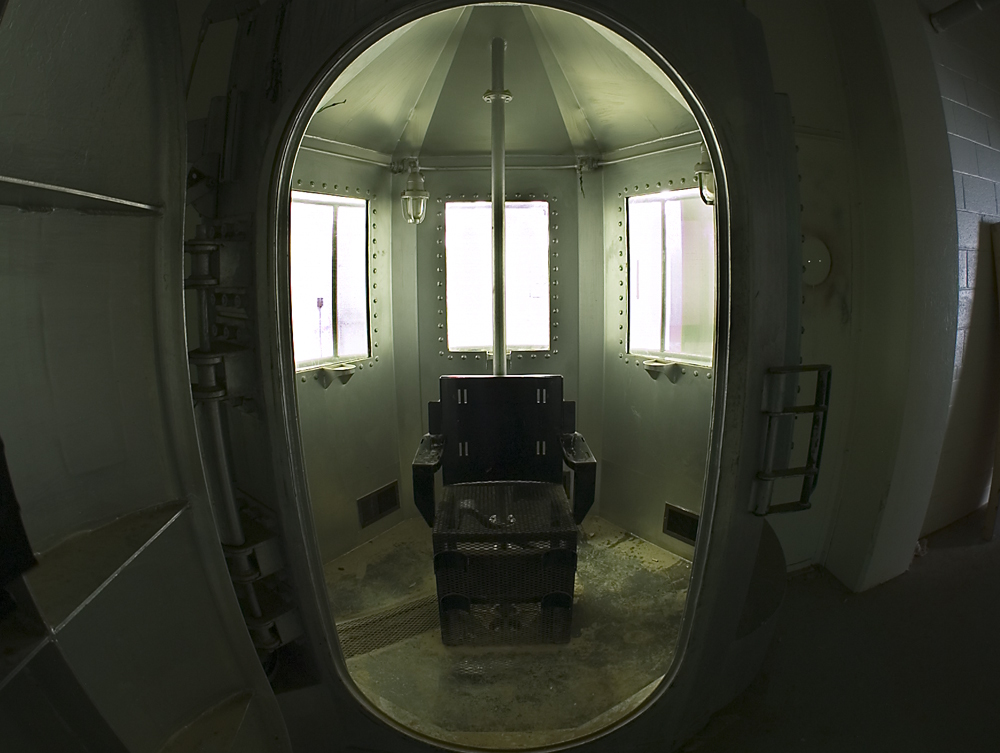
The former gas chamber at New Mexico State Penitentiary, used only once in 1960 and later replaced by lethal injection.

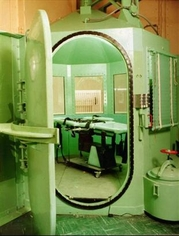
Executions in California were carried out in the gas chamber at San Quentin State Prison. It was modified for the use of lethal injection, but has been returned to its original designated purpose, with the creation of a new chamber specifically for lethal injection.

The hydrogen cyanide gas chamber is considered to be the most dangerous, most complicated, most time-consuming and most expensive method of administering the death penalty. It is also notoriously impossible to halt once initiated, which has made stays impossible to carry out, such as in the case of Burton Abbott. The same event supposedly occurred in the final, completed execution of Caryl Chessman in 1960.

The condemned person is strapped into a chair within an airtight chamber, which is then sealed. The executioner activates a mechanism which drops potassium cyanide (or sodium cyanide) pellets into a bath of sulfuric acid beneath the chair; the ensuing chemical reaction generates lethal hydrogen cyanide gas.

H_{2}SO_{4} + 2 XCN → 2 HCN + X_{2}SO_{4} (X is an alkali metal ion)

The condemned is advised to take several deep breaths to speed unconsciousness. Nonetheless, the condemned person often convulses and drools and may also urinate, defecate, and vomit.

Following the execution the chamber is purged with air, and any remnant gas is neutralized with anhydrous ammonia, after which the body can be removed (with great caution, as pockets of gas can be trapped in the victim's clothing).

=== Excluding all oxygen ===
Nitrogen gas or oxygen-depleted air has been considered for human execution, as it can induce nitrogen asphyxiation. The victim detects little abnormal sensation as the oxygen level falls. This leads to asphyxiation (death from lack of oxygen) without the painful and traumatic feeling of suffocation, or the side effects of poisoning.

In April 2015, Oklahoma governor Mary Fallin approved a bill allowing nitrogen asphyxiation as an execution method. On March 14, 2018, Oklahoma attorney general Mike Hunter and Corrections Director Joe M. Allbaugh announced a switch to nitrogen gas as the state's primary method of execution. After struggling for years to design a nitrogen execution protocol, the state of Oklahoma announced in February 2020 that it was abandoning the project after finding a reliable source of drugs to carry out the lethal injection executions.

In 2018, Alabama approved nitrogen asphyxiation as an execution method and allowed death row inmates a choice of method. In September 2022, a court stayed the execution of Alan Eugene Miller, who was set to be executed by lethal injection. Miller asserted that he had chosen nitrogen hypoxia as his method of execution, as permitted by Alabama law, but the form documenting his choice had been lost. The court decided to stay the execution to allow for further investigation into his claim. On January 25, 2024, Kenneth Eugene Smith became the first person to be executed by nitrogen asphyxiation.
