= Joseph Bowers =

American prisoner who was the first inmate to attempt an escape from Alcatraz

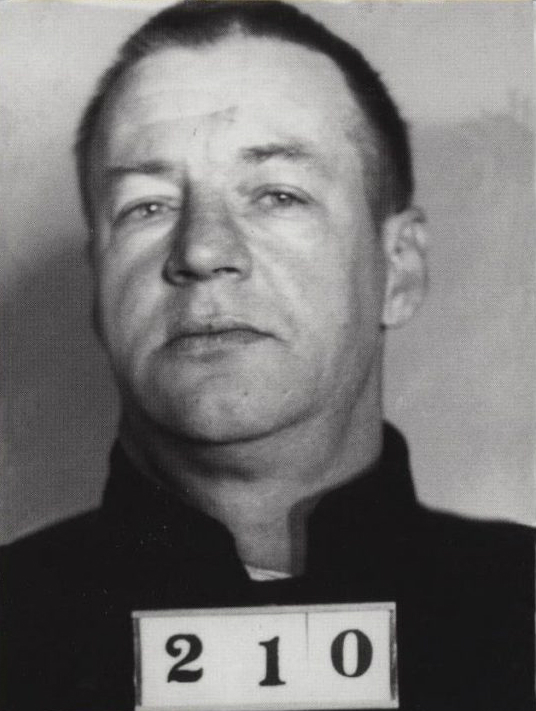
- Born: February 18, 1897; Rohrbach in Oberösterreich, Austria-Hungary
- Died: April 27, 1936 (aged 39); Alcatraz Federal Penitentiary, San Francisco, California, U.S.
- Other names: Joseph "Dutch" Bowers; Josef Ebner
- Known for: Being the first prisoner to attempt an escape from Alcatraz prison

Joseph "Dutch" Bowers (born Josef Ebner, February 18, 1897 – April 27, 1936) was an inmate who was the first man to attempt an escape from the federal penitentiary on Alcatraz Island. Born in Rohrbach in Oberösterreich, Austria-Hungary, Bowers was arrested for robbery of mail with a firearm. Having been on Alcatraz for nearly two years, he was fatally shot during his escape attempt.

== Alcatraz ==
Bowers arrived at Alcatraz on 4 September 1934. he was documented as the following:

Joseph Bowers was by all accounts a desperado and loner, unable to come to terms with the conditions of Alcatraz. Imprisoned during the toughest and most strict era on Alcatraz, Bowers, serving a 25-year sentence for Postal Mail Robbery that netted a mere sixteen dollars and thirty eight cents. He held an expansive criminal record and as one report highlighted: 'If at large, he probably would engage again in criminal activities and constitute a serious menace to the public safety and society.' He had claimed, and it was also supported in belief by fellow inmates that his crimes had resulted from a lacking ability to support himself. He claimed that he was completely desperate and out of funds, hungry and mostly unable to afford food or proper lodging.

On April 27, 1936, Bowers worked alone at the incinerator on a lower level of the island's west side. He burned trash and mashed tin cans and sent them rattling into the bay. Tower guard E.F. Chandler saw Bowers dash to the fence and start climbing. After Chandler claimed to have shouted through his megaphone for Bowers to stop, he raised his gun and fired several shots at the convict. One bullet hit Bowers through the lungs, and he leaped convulsively, before he fell sixty feet to the rocks below. The prison launch recovered his body.

The incident termed Bowers's "Desperate Escape" was variously deemed by inmates to have been an actual escape attempt, a deliberate suicide (Bowers had made multiple suicide attempts, and was deemed by some prisoners to be criminally insane), an attempt to climb up to grab garbage wedged in the chain link fence (Bowers was assigned to the garbage incinerator detail), or as an alternative account comes from convict Henry Larry who claims to have watched Bowers, he was feeding seagulls, stacked some empty barrels and climbed up next to the fence so he could retrieve a bit of food which had fallen on the barbed wire. He stood there feeding the birds for several minutes. However, regardless of Bowers's initial motive, it is indisputable that Bowers ignored the forceful signals to halt and he kept climbing even after Chandler began firing, such that he fell on the outside of the fence.
