= Fusillade =

Simultaneous and continuous firing of firearms on command

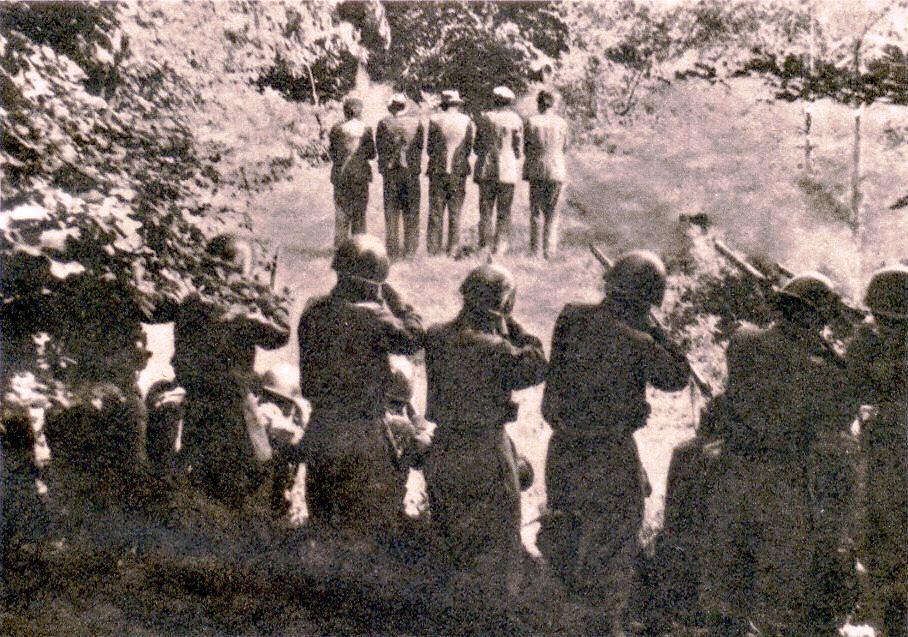
Italian soldiers shooting Slovenian hostages from village Dane in Loška dolina. Names of victims: Franc Žnidaršič, Janez Kranjc, Franc Škerbec, Feliks Žnidaršič in Edvard Škerbec

A fusillade is the simultaneous and continuous firing of a group of firearms on command. It stems from the French word fusil, meaning firearm, and fusiller meaning to shoot.

In the context of military tactics, the term is generally used to refer to a type of organized and concentrated gunfire from a military unit armed with small arms, and initiated by a command from a commanding officer. The term can also be used as a verb, as in "to fusillade an enemy position". Suppressing fire (done in conjunction with fire and movement) is often in the form of a fusillade.

== Related terms ==
- Salvo or broadside refers to the simultaneous fire of naval artillery.
- Barrage or cannonade refers to a land-based artillery strike.
- Volley indicates a singular simultaneous discharge of a group of small arms, which is then followed by a short interval for reloading. The command to fire is re-issued before each individual volley to preserve organization. This was commonly used during the age of musketry and is still currently used in the form of the 3-volley salute.
- Execution by firing squad refers to the capital punishment by firearms. It is sometimes called "fusillading".

In non-military contexts, a fusillade is used to mean a sudden flurry or outburst of activity directed at something, such as "a fusillade of questions".

== See also ==
- Volley fire
- Volley gun - A firearm which discharges a group of barrels simultaneously.
