= Clarence Carnes =

Choctaw–American murderer

Clarence Victor Carnes
- Carnes in his prison cell
- Born: January 14, 1927; Daisy, Oklahoma, U.S.
- Died: October 3, 1988 (aged 61); MCFP Springfield, Springfield, Missouri, U.S.
- Other name: The Choctaw Kid
- Convictions: Federal; First degree murder of a federal employee Assault of a federal employee Kidnapping; Oklahoma; First degree murder
- Penalty: Federal; Life imprisonment plus 104 years Oklahoma; Life imprisonment

Clarence Victor Carnes (January 14, 1927 – October 3, 1988), known as The Choctaw Kid, was a Choctaw man best known as the youngest inmate incarcerated at Alcatraz and for his participation in the bloody escape attempt known as the Battle of Alcatraz.

== Early life ==
Clarence Carnes was born in Daisy, Oklahoma, the oldest of five children. He was raised in poverty. His criminal activities began as a child, stealing candy bars from his school. At the age of 16, he and a school mate from the Jones Academy (Oklahoma) were sentenced to life imprisonment for the 1943 murder of a garage attendant during an attempted hold-up.

While awaiting charges, the two escaped from jail in Atoka, Oklahoma, but they were recaptured the same day. In early 1945, he escaped from the Granite Reformatory with a number of other prisoners. In April 1945 he was recaptured and sentenced to an additional 99 years for kidnapping a man, Jack Nance, while he was on the run.

He was then sent to Leavenworth. He attempted to escape while in the custody of the United States Marshals Service and was transferred to Alcatraz, with an additional five-year sentence. There, he was assessed by psychiatrist Romney M. Ritchey and found to have a psychopathic personality, and to be emotionally unstable, with an I.Q. of 93.

== Alcatraz ==
Carnes arrived on Alcatraz on July 6, 1945. On May 2, 1946, Carnes and five other inmates participated in a failed attempt to escape from Alcatraz which turned into the bloody "Battle of Alcatraz", so-called because three inmates and two prison officers died. After the escape failed, he was tried for murder with the two other survivors, Sam Shockley and Miran Edgar Thompson, and was found guilty of participating in the plot.

Shockley and Thompson were sentenced to death. Carnes was not executed because he had not directly participated in the murders of the officers and was instead given a life sentence. Some corrections officers who had been taken hostage testified that he had refrained from following instructions to kill them.

Carnes remained on Alcatraz until its closure in 1963, spending most of his time there in the segregation unit. He claimed that he had received a postcard from Frank Morris and the Anglin brothers, John and Clarence, which read "Gone fishing", which was a code word that their escape had succeeded. No material evidence of such a postcard has been found.

== Parole, re-incarceration, death ==
At the time of Carnes' convictions, the federal government still had parole. Consequently, he was paroled in 1973, at the age of 46. Carnes's parole was revoked twice due to parole violations and he was sent back to prison with BOP# 61805-132. He died of AIDS-related complications on October 3, 1988, at the Medical Center for Federal Prisoners in Springfield, Missouri, and was buried in a paupers' grave.

In 1989, Massachusetts organized crime figure James J. "Whitey" Bulger, who had befriended Carnes while on Alcatraz, paid for his body to be exhumed and reburied on land in the Choctaw Nation of Oklahoma. Bulger reportedly bought a lavish $4,000 bronze casket and paid for a car to transport Carnes' remains from Missouri to Oklahoma. Carnes is buried at the Billy Cemetery in Daisy, Oklahoma.

== In popular culture ==
Carnes' life was dramatized in the 1980 Telepictures Corporation TV movie Alcatraz: The Whole Shocking Story. The film, which aired in two 95 minute parts, starred Michael Beck as Clarence Carnes.

The Battle of Alcatraz was dramatized in the 1987 TV movie Six Against the Rock, based on the novel by Clark Howard. While most of the characters were given the names of the real inmates (such as Bernard Coy and Miran Thompson), Carnes' character was renamed Dan Durando, portrayed by Paul Sanchez.

Carnes' life was interpreted in Rolling Way the Rock, a performance piece by Tim Tingle, also a Choctaw man, which premiered in 2006 at the International Symposium of Artists of Conscience in Victoria, British Columbia.

On 2018, Derek Nelson portrayed Carnes in the film “Alcatraz,” which has Carnes as the central figure of the film, with interiors and exteriors shot at a prison in Brighton, England, and on Alcatraz Island, now a US National Park site.
