= Joseph Paul Cretzer =

American bank robber (1911–1946)

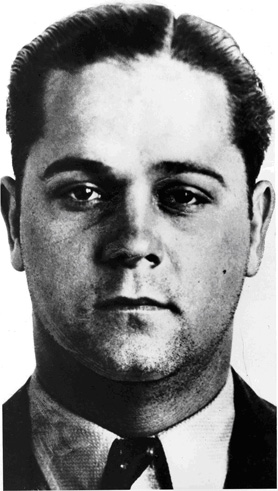
- Born: April 17, 1911; Anaconda, Montana, U.S.
- Died: May 4, 1946 (aged 35); Alcatraz Federal Penitentiary, San Francisco, California, U.S.
- Cause of death: Gunshot wounds
- Resting place: Cypress Lawn Memorial Park, Colma, California, U.S.
- Known for: Bank robber
- Spouse: Edna Kyle (before 1936)
- Status: Deceased
- Convictions: Second degree murder (18 U.S.C. § 452); Bank robbery (12 U.S.C. § 588b)
- Penalty: Life imprisonment

Joseph Paul "Dutch" Cretzer (April 17, 1911 − May 4, 1946) was an American bank robber and prisoner at Alcatraz who participated in and was slain in the bloody "Battle of Alcatraz" which took place following a failed escape attempt between May 2 and May 4, 1946.

== Early life ==
Joseph P. Cretzer was born on April 17, 1911, in Anaconda, Montana. He was the son of two deaf-mute parents. Cretzer's mother was Lottie Alice "Lillie" Thompson, who was born in Missouri in 1874. His father was Elza Anton Cretzer, who was born in Ohio in 1871. Elza Cretzer attended the Ohio School for the Deaf and later the California School for the Deaf. Elza Cretzer joined a deaf-mute gang of burglars, which led to a one-year prison conviction.

After Elza's release, he moved to Rock Creek, Wyoming. Elza worked in Rock Creek as a miner for three years before he lost his job. Elza continued prospecting for gold in the Rockies. In 1897, Elza was arrested for grand larceny in Utah. On September 22, 1897, Elza was convicted of Grand Larceny in the District Court of Weber County, UT.

Elza was sentenced to a year in prison but was ultimately pardoned due to a letter written by the people of Rock Creek, WY. Elza moved to Montana after his release and met Lillie Thompson. Elza received national attention for a deaf alarm clock invented in 1902. Elza and Lillie had five children, including Joseph.

Joseph Cretzer learned American Sign Language at a young age because of his parents, which would later be a key aspect of his escape attempts later in life. He and his family moved to Denver, Colorado, where he spent most of his boyhood. Cretzer's parents were later divorced.

== Criminal career ==
Cretzer started his criminal career at an early age and had been in and out of prison since 1927. He was married to Edna May Kyle, the sister of Arnold Kyle. On January 25, 1936, Edna Cretzer was taken into custody and charged with running a brothel in Pittsburg, California. She quickly posted bail while her husband Joseph remained a fugitive.

Cretzer and Kyle formed the backbone of a gang, the Cretzer-Kyle Gang, which robbed banks along the west coast. Cretzer's prowess led to him reaching national public enemy no. 4 status on the Federal Bureau of Investigation's most wanted list by September 1939.

On August 27, 1939, Cretzer was apprehended by the FBI when they caught up to him in Chicago, Illinois. On November 7, 1939, his wife Edna pleaded guilty to harboring her husband and Cretzer confessed to one of the robberies in Los Angeles on January 24, 1940. Cretzer was sentenced to 25 years imprisonment and was incarcerated at McNeil Island.

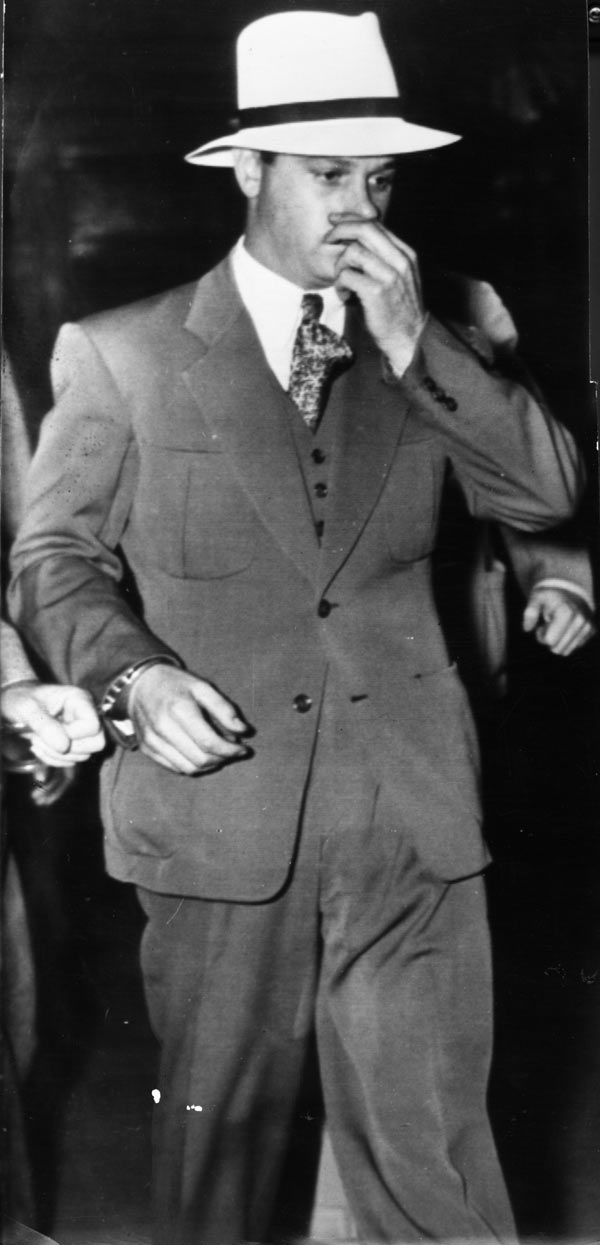
Cretzer arrested

== Prison ==
In February 1940, Cretzer began serving his sentence at McNeil Island Corrections Center. Cretzer reunited with his old partner and brother-in-law, Arnold Kyle. In April 1940, he and Kyle hijacked a prison lorry in an attempt to escape. Both were recaptured after three days hiding in the woods. On June 26, 1940, Cretzer and Kyle were indicted by a federal grand jury in Tacoma, Washington for attempting to escape from the McNeil Island Penitentiary. The convicts were transported from the island to the U.S. District Court in Tacoma for arraignment on four occasions, and each time postponed a plea.

Judge Yankwich, visiting from Los Angeles, was convinced the men were making as many trips as possible, hoping for an opportunity to escape. The judge declared that he was not going to be a party to any more commuting and would grant no more continuances. On July 20, Cretzer and Kyle entered pleas of not guilty, and Judge Yankwich set the trial date for August 22, 1940. Tacoma attorneys Anthony M. Ursich, and William F. LeVeque were appointed to represent the defendants. A trial began in a U.S. District Court in Tacoma on August 22, 1940.

During the sentencing in the courthouse, US Marshal Artis James Chitty entered a cell to return Cretzer and Kyle back to the courtroom. The two men sprang to their feet and Cretzer grabbed Chitty around the waist and pulled him forward. Marshal Chitty was thrown against the cell wall and Kyle reached for Chitty's right-hand back pocket in an attempt to snatch his revolver. A struggle ensued and all three men fell onto the floor. A penitentiary guard grabbed Kyle just as he struck Chitty in the face with his right fist.

More guards rushed in and quickly subdued the prisoners. Chitty arose, berated the men and then walked into an adjoining office. Chitty while speaking to a clerk, Lillian Holtz, collapsed onto the floor and was unconscious. He was carried into his private office where two physicians pronounced him dead. Less than 10 minutes had elapsed from the time he was attacked until his death. He died from a heart attack as result of the struggle with Cretzer, following another failed attempt to escape.

Deputy marshals escorted Cretzer and Kyle back into the courtroom and Judge Yankwich resumed the trial. When the court denied a motion for a mistrial, the two defendants withdrew their not-guilty pleas and entered pleas of guilty to the escape charge. Judge Yankwich sentenced Cretzer and Kyle to additional terms of five years, to commence at the expiration of their 25-year sentences for bank robbery. The Bureau of Prisons quietly transferred Cretzer and Kyle to the Alcatraz Island Federal Penitentiary in San Francisco Bay, a maximum security prison established in 1934 to hold violent and incorrigible prisoners.

Cretzer and Kyle both pleaded guilty to second degree murder for Chitty's death, and received life sentences.

In August 1940, Cretzer was sent to Alcatraz and assigned inmate number 548AZ. On May 21, 1941, he attempted to escape from one of the island's workshops called the Model Industries Building along with Sam Shockley, Arnold Kyle, and Lloyd Barkdoll. Cretzer prior to the escape used American Sign Language to communicate with his wife, Edna Cretzer in devising a plan to have a speed boat pick up the prisoners during the escape. Alcatraz guards routinely monitored communications by mail and during visitation, but the guards were unable to detect the plan while using American Sign Language with Edna. On the morning of the escape, Edna was also arrested in San Francisco for shoplifting.

During the escape attempt the men held a number of guards hostage, but gave up when they failed to cut through the tool-proof bars with an emery wheel. For this escape attempt, Cretzer was sentenced by an internal tribunal to serve five years in the prison's high-security unit, called D Block, which was isolated from the rest of the prison and where prisoners were confined to their cells almost all of the time.

== Battle of Alcatraz ==
Cretzer had only recently been let out of D Block when he became an accomplice in another escape plan. This plan was hatched by the cell-house orderly Bernard Coy, who offered Cretzer a place on the break out, in return for use of his onshore contacts. On May 2, 1946, Bernard Coy attacked officer William Miller, which led to the release of Cretzer and Clarence Carnes from their cells. The guard later returned and Coy overpowered the guard. Coy kept the Springfield rifle and lowered down an M1911 pistol, keys, several clubs, and gas grenades to his accomplices.

Coy later entered D Block, which was separated from the main cell house by a concrete wall and was used for prisoners kept in isolation. There, he used the rifle to force officer Cecil Corwin to open the door to the main cell house and let the others in. They released about a dozen convicts, including Sam Shockley and Miran Thompson. Shockley and Thompson joined Coy, Carnes, Hubbard, and Cretzer in the main cell house. The other prisoners returned to their cells.

The gang put guards Miller and Corwin in a cell in C Block. Officer Miller held onto the key to the yard which was later found by the prisoners. The prisoners tried to open the yard door but were unable to open the door due to its lock having jammed. The prisoners tried several other keys while searching for the correct one. The escape plan was thus inadvertently foiled from the outset, as the prisoners were trapped in the cell house.

Additional officers who entered the cell house as part of their routine were seized, along with others sent to investigate when the former officer failed to report in. The prisoners were soon holding nine officers in two cells, but with nowhere to go, they began to despair. Having failed on their initial plan, the prisoners decided to shoot it out.

At 14:35 Coy took the rifle and fired at the officers in some neighboring watchtowers, wounding one of them. Associate warden Ed Miller went to the cell house to investigate, armed with a gas billy club. He came across Coy, who shot at him. Miller retreated. By now, the alarm had been raised.

Their plan had failed. Shockley and Thompson urged Cretzer, who had one of the guns, to kill the hostages in case they testified against them. Cretzer opened fire on the officers, wounding five, three seriously, including Bill Miller, who later died of his wounds. Carnes, Shockley, and Thompson returned to their cells, but Coy, Hubbard, and Cretzer decided they were not going to surrender. Meanwhile, one of the hostages wrote down the names of the convicts involved, circling the names of the ringleaders.

At about 18:00, a squad of armed officers entering the gun cage was shot at by the convicts. One officer, Harold Stites, was killed by friendly fire, and four other officers were wounded. Prison officials cut the electricity and delayed further attempts to regain control of the cell house until darkness.

Warden James A. Johnston asked for federal troops from nearby Naval Station Treasure Island to help deal with the situation. Two platoons of Marines under the direction of Generals "Vinegar" Joe Stilwell and Frank Merrill were dispatched to the island to guard the general population of convicts and take the cell house from the outside.

After night fell, two squads of officers entered the prison to locate and rescue the captive officers. There was a long-standing rule at Alcatraz that no guns were allowed in the cell house, and the prison officials did not want more officers injured or killed. The convicts' position on the top of a cell block provided a nearly impregnable firing position, as they were out of range of the officers in the gun cages.

At 20:00, unarmed officers entered the cell house, covered by armed officers in the two gun galleries overhead. They found the hostages; however, one officer was wounded by a gunshot fired from the roof of one of the cell blocks. They locked the open door to D Block. When the last officer reached safety, the officers opened a massive barrage of machine guns, mortars, and grenades on the prisoners within D Block, where the prison authorities erroneously thought one of the armed convicts was holed up. They eventually figured out that the rebellious prisoners were confined to the main cell house and ceased their attack until further tactics were worked out.

The Marines, led by World War II veteran, Warrant Officer Charles Lafayette Buckner IX, drove the armed convicts into a corner with tactics they had perfected against entrenched Japanese resistance during the Pacific War. They drilled holes in the prison roof and dropped grenades into areas where they believed the convicts were located, to force them into a utility corridor where they could be cornered.

On May 3, at about noon, the convicts phoned Johnston to try to discuss a deal. Johnston would accept only their surrender. Cretzer replied that he'd never be taken alive. Later that day, a shot was fired at an officer as he checked out C Block's utility corridor. That night, the Marines fired a constant fusillade at the cell block until about 21:00. The following morning, squads of armed officers periodically rushed into the cell house, firing repeatedly into the narrow corridor. At 09:40 on May 4, they finally entered the corridor and found the bodies of Cretzer, Coy, and Hubbard.

The failure of the plan led to the bloody and hopeless standoff known as the "Battle of Alcatraz" during which Cretzer, armed with an M1911 pistol, opened fire on many hostage guards. Cretzer made no attempt to surrender and was slain by guard fire or committed suicide early on May 4 when trapped in a utility corridor.

Cretzer began his final journey with Coy and Hubbard, wrapped in blankets and tied in twine to canvas stretchers for a 12-minute boat ride across San Francisco Bay to Dock Four at nearby Fort Mason, where the bodies begin being prepped for disposal. Per Cretzer's wishes (given to his now ex-wife when he was sentenced to life on Alcatraz), his corpse was turned over to Edna May. Edna May attempted to turn over a new leaf by divorcing Cretzer while he was at Alcatraz and marrying a truck driver. Edna May accepted her ex-husband's cremated remains and later placed them in an urn at San Francisco's Cypress Lawn Memorial Park in Colma, San Mateo County, California. Only Edna May and her lawyer were present when his interment took place.

Cretzer's urn was later removed by an unknown person and only a mugshot and dried flower remain at the Cypress Lawn Memorial Cemetery.

== Film depictions ==
Cretzer was portrayed by Telly Savalas in Alcatraz — The Whole Shocking Story (1980) and by Howard Hesseman in Six Against the Rock (1987).
