= Bernard Coy =

American bank robber (1900–1946)

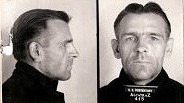
- Bernard Coy mug shots, 1937
- Born: Bernard Paul Coy; February 13, 1900; Athertonville, Kentucky
- Died: May 4, 1946 (aged 46); Alcatraz Federal Penitentiary, San Francisco, California, U.S.
- Resting place: Woodlawn Memorial Park Cemetery
- Status: Deceased (Killed during escape attempt)
- Convictions: Bank robbery, Kentucky
- Penalty: 25 years imprisonment

Bernard Paul "Barney" Coy (February 13, 1900 – May 4, 1946) was an American bank robber and federal prisoner best known as the planner of a failed escape attempt from Alcatraz, on May 2, 1946, which turned into a bloody two-day armed confrontation leaving Coy, two fellow would-be escapees and two prison guards dead.

== Biography ==
Coy was a native of Kentucky who turned to crime during the Great Depression. In 1937, he was sentenced to 25 years' imprisonment for committing a robbery with a sawed-off shotgun. In 1938, he was transferred to Alcatraz from Atlanta and was later given the position of cell-house orderly which allowed him access through most of the main cell block on Alcatraz. This relative freedom allowed him to spot a tiny flaw in one of the prison's security features, the bars of the gun gallery overlooking the cell house. Coy along with Joe Cretzer, Marvin Hubbard, Sam Shockley, Miran Thompson, and Clarence Carnes planned to break into the gun galleries to steal weapons, take hostages and then flee to the dock.

Coy was successful in creating a makeshift bar-spreader devised from toilet fixtures in the prison workshops, which he hid in a cloth bag inside his mouth. This device enabled him to create a gap of approximately ten inches between the relatively weak bars that protected the gun galleries, then enter and overpower the unsuspecting guard on his return from investigating a fabricated incident caused by Shockley in the prison's secure unit, D-Block. The guard was quickly overpowered and strangled into unconsciousness. Coy then lowered numerous weapons to his fellow conspirators, then took the keys from the guard which provided access to the recreation yard.

The prisoners now had one Springfield rifle, one .45-caliber semi-automatic handgun, and a club. The most important item supposed to be held in the cage was the key to the yard door of the prison, from which the convicts expected to make their way to the island's dock to seize the prison's boat. However, Bill Miller, one of the nine guards held hostage in two cells had, contrary to regulations, held onto the yard door key, to let out kitchen staff without having to disturb the gallery guard at lunch, instead of returning it to the gun gallery. The escape attempt was thus foiled inadvertently as although the prisoners eventually found the key following a search of the captive guards and cells, the door would not open, because it had been jammed by trying the lock with different keys, as it was designed to do.

The escapees held several guards hostage. As there was no hope of negotiating, the struggle between prison authorities and the group of prisoners turned into a violent stand-off, that became known as the Battle of Alcatraz or "Alcatraz Blastout". After two days, prison guards regained control of the prison. Coy's body was found in a utility corridor along with those of Cretzer and Hubbard.

== Cited works and further reading ==
- McCavour, Thomas (2018). TC Tales. Victoria, British Columbia: Friesen Press. ISBN 978-1-525-52048-8.
- Ward, David (2010). Alcatraz: The Gangster Years. Oakland: University of California Press. ISBN 978-0-520-26596-7.
