= Miran Edgar Thompson =

American murderer (1917–1948)

- Born: December 16, 1917; Union Church, Alabama, U.S.
- Died: December 3, 1948 (aged 30); San Quentin State Prison, California, U.S.
- Status: Executed by gas chamber
- Convictions: Federal; First degree murder of a federal employee Kidnapping; Texas; Murder with malice
- Penalty: Federal; 99 years imprisonment (kidnapping); Death (murder); Texas; Life imprisonment

Miran Edgar Thompson (December 16, 1917 – December 3, 1948) was an inmate of Alcatraz whose participation in an attempted escape on May 2, 1946, led to his execution in the gas chamber of San Quentin.

== Biography ==
At the time of the Battle of Alcatraz, Thompson was serving life plus 99 years for the murder of Texan police officer Detective Lemuel Dodd Savage, 52. He also committed armed robberies in New Mexico, Colorado, Kansas and Oklahoma. He had notoriously bad luck when getting caught, but extremely good luck at escaping from jail. He had been arrested eight times and held in small jails, and had escaped every time. Thompson had a record of eight escapes from custody by the time he was transferred to Alcatraz in October 1945.

On March 15, 1945, Detective Savage was shot and killed while transporting Thompson and Elbert Day to jail. Savage had arrested the two when he found them burglarizing a store. He searched the two suspects before transporting, but missed a handgun hidden in Thompson's pants. During the transport, Thompson produced the gun and shot Savage. As Thompson fled, he kidnapped a woman, Betty Jim Shelton, before he was apprehended.

Thompson was convicted of federal kidnapping charges. He was then tried on a state murder charge for killing Savage. The jury convicted Thompson of murder, but spared his life in a 7–5 vote. Thompson was sent to Alcatraz Prison. While in Alcatraz, Thompson was part of the Battle of Alcatraz, an escape attempt that ultimately left Correctional Officer Harold Stites and Correctional Officer William Miller, of the Federal Bureau of Prisons, dead from gunshot wounds.

=== Battle of Alcatraz ===
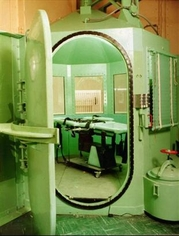
The gas chamber at San Quentin

On May 2, 1946, Thompson, with five other inmates, participated in the unsuccessful attempt to escape Alcatraz by seizing the prison's gun gallery and then the prison launch to San Francisco. Although initially successful, the convicts failed to open the yard door and the failed escape turned into a bloody struggle that lasted almost two days before prison authorities regained control.

Thompson survived the fighting, which left two corrections officers dead and thirteen wounded, and three convicts dead. Thompson was tried for his part in the violence, specifically accused of inciting Joe Cretzer to open fire on nine hostage guards in an effort to eliminate witnesses.

Thompson was found guilty along with inmate Sam Shockley, and they were executed simultaneously in the gas chamber of San Quentin on December 3, 1948.

== See also ==
- Capital punishment by the United States federal government
- List of people executed by the United States federal government
- List of people executed in the United States in 1948
