= Sam Shockley =

American murderer (1909–1948)

Samuel Richard Shockley, Jr.
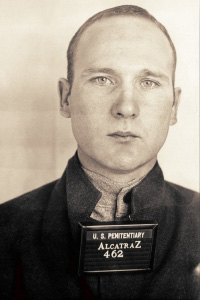
- Shockley's Alcatraz mugshot
- Born: January 12, 1909; Cerro Gordo, Caney Township, Arkansas, U.S.
- Died: December 3, 1948 (aged 39); San Quentin State Prison, California, U.S.
- Resting place: Pollard cemetery in Haworth, Oklahoma
- Other names: Crazy Sam, Little Sam, Sam Barnes
- Status: Executed by gas chamber
- Convictions: First degree murder of a federal employee Bank robbery Kidnapping
- Penalty: Life imprisonment (May 16, 1938); Death (December 21, 1946)

Samuel Richard Shockley Jr. (January 12, 1909 – December 3, 1948) was an inmate at Alcatraz prison, who was executed for his participation in the Alcatraz uprising or Battle of Alcatraz in 1946.

== Background ==
Sam Shockley was born in Cerro Gordo, Caney Township, Little River County, Arkansas. His father, Richard Shockley, was a sharecropper who married three times and had eight children. As a newborn baby, Sam survived an accident when his 9-year-old sister, Myrtle, was looking after the other children while their parents worked on the land. With baby Sam on her arm, she came too close to the fireplace and her dress caught fire. She ran out of the house and collapsed, throwing the baby clear, and both lay outside for six hours. Both were burned, and Sam had fallen hard.

Sam's mother, Annyer Eugenia, Richard's second wife, died when Sam was 7 years old. Sam started running away from home after his stepmother, Sally Barton, died of malaria in 1920. When he was 12, his father took him out of school to work in the fields; his formal education ended at the third grade. By the age of 13 he exhibited signs of serious instability.

In 1927, he left the family for good and became a transient. Soon after that he was arrested for stealing chickens, automobile tires and accessories in Garvin County, Oklahoma. On July 3, 1928, was sentenced to one year in the Oklahoma State Reformatory at Granite.

While in prison, Sam Shockley was beaten by a fellow inmate, suffering brain damage and numerous scars on his head and neck. He was released in July 1929. In the early 1930s he was arrested several times for drunkenness and disorderly conduct. He escaped from the jail in Birmingham, Alabama, and was beaten by a police officer, receiving further head trauma. In June 1936, Shockley married Betty Moore (born 1923 in Shoshone, Idaho), but the marriage only lasted a year and a half. They divorced in June 1939.

In March 1938, Shockley was arrested with Edward Johnson for robbing a man of his car, robbing the bank of Paoli, Oklahoma, and kidnapping two employees, Mr. and Mrs. D. F. Pendley; Shockley attempted to escape during the arrest. They were both convicted of kidnapping. Although the Pendleys had not died, the prosecution still requested death sentences. The jury spared both of them from execution and they were instead sentenced to life in prison on May 16, 1938.

When examined by prison psychiatrists at Leavenworth, Shockley was determined to have an IQ of 68 and a mental age of 10 years, 10 months. According to the report, he suffered episodes of hallucinations and demonstrated serious emotional instability and was incapable of coping with the normal prison environment, presenting a risk to himself and others. Rather than transferring him to the Medical Center for Federal Prisoners at Springfield, Missouri, officials at Leavenworth sent him to Alcatraz on September 23, 1938, where it was believed the strict routine would better manage him.

== Alcatraz ==
Shockley was placed for three years in the D block isolation section, for most of the time in the "Hole" or "Dungeon", the darkened, stripped cells on the ground level, where he spent most of his time in darkness. At night, he was allowed a blanket and a mattress. During the day he was sitting and lying on the cold concrete. His condition deteriorated. He displayed classic schizophrenic symptoms: delusions, auditory hallucinations, and disorientation. His IQ dropped to 54, indicating a mental age of 8. In 1942, the Alcatraz prison physician described him as emotionally very unstable, with episodes of hallucinations.

On May 21, 1941, Shockley was involved with Joe Cretzer, Arnold "Shorty" Kyle, and Lloyd Barkdoll (an Oregon bankrobber) in an attempted escape from one of the island's workshops. The men held a number of guards hostage while attempting to saw through the steel bars from the inside. After an hour of unsuccessful sawing, they surrendered and released their hostages unharmed after the captain of the guards Paul Madigan, convinced them to give themselves up before more reinforcements arrived. Barkdoll managed to speak with Warden James Johnston and convinced him that Shockley was not involved in the plot, and Shockley was released and sent back to his cell.

On May 2, 1946, during an attempted escape, inmates Bernard Coy, Joseph Cretzer, and Marvin Hubbard took custodial guard Cecil Corwin by surprise. They planned to take control of the cell house and the D isolation cell block in order to free inmate Rufus Whitey Franklin from the isolation block. None of the keys they had fit the rear door leading to the recreation yard, their intended escape route; custodial guard Joseph Burdett had hidden this key under the wall seat of cell 404.

As designed, the lock jammed after repeated attempts to open it with the wrong key. A 48-hour armed confrontation ensued, in which two custodial guards, Bill Miller and Harold Stites, and three inmates, Coy, Cretzer and Hubbard, were killed. Thirteen guards were injured, three critically.

Shockley was tried for participation in the attempted escape and the killing and injury of the guards. Judge Louis Goodman appointed William A. Sullivan to defend Shockley. Goodman elicited a statement from custodial guard Carl W. Sundstrom that he had at no time seen a weapon in Shockley's hands, and that while Shockley did attack Sundstrom, he did not injure Sundstrom at any time. Sundstrom also stated that Sam Shockley was running around and acting like a crazy man.

Other inmates such as Jack Pepper, James Quillen, Howard Butler, Edwin Sharp, and Louis Fleish made statements that Sam Shockley was running up and down the corridors carrying a wrench and wearing an officer's jacket several sizes too large for him, and repeatedly swore at the hostages. The men all established that Shockley was in the D block when the shooting began that injured the guards taken hostage, and later killed guard W. H. Miller. Inmate Joseph Moyle testified that Sam Shockley did not say anything; he was just standing at the hostage cells, and he did not think Shockley knew what was going on.

He and other inmates who testified in court denied that they ever heard Sam Shockley urge Joseph Cretzer to shoot the guards. Sam Shockley was not a part of the plan at all and merely tagged along because no one told him he could not. If Sam Shockley was to have been a key figure in helping Bernie Coy enter the gun gallery, he would not have risked being placed in a solitary cell by smashing and setting fire to his cell in the riot of March 1946.

If there had been enough solitary cells available, Shockley would have been locked up in one as Franklin had been. The failure to release Rufus Franklin was a good indication that no one in D Block had been aware of the break prior to its occurrence. Joseph Moyle agreed to testify as an important defense witness, but Warden Johnston handed Sullivan a letter in which Moyle declared that he no longer wished to be summoned as a witness in the court case, because it would not be in his interest. With this, Sullivan lost one of his best witnesses in the case.

Judge Goodman denied a motion for a separate trial for each of the defendants, on the ground that they could not receive a fair trial if they were tried together, because the acts of each defendant would be considered by the jury to be acts of all. A motion for the transfer of the trial was denied, on the ground that the widespread adverse publicity and press coverage would prevent the defendants from obtaining a fair trial.

Judge Goodman also denied a request for two lawyers to assist Sam Shockley, and a request for an independent psychiatrist to testify that Shockley was mentally ill or insane. Dr. Alden, the court-appointed psychiatrist, was the only medical witness to testify regarding the issue of Shockley's sanity, and had only an hour to examine Shockley.

Frank Hennessy, the U.S. Attorney, and Judge Goodman feared a repetition of the 1941 trial of Henri Young, in which the jury publicly attacked Warden Johnston's administration as cruel and inhumane, and demanded that Alcatraz be closed and the administration investigated by the United States Marshals Service. Young, like Shockley, was mentally handicapped, had been confined for lengthy periods in isolation and had a long record of minor misbehavior for which he had been harshly punished, and had almost complete lack of recall of the events for which he was on trial.

On December 21, 1946, Sam Shockley, along with Miran Thompson and Clarence Carnes, was found guilty of murder in the first degree at their trial before the Circuit Court of Appeals, Ninth Circuit in San Francisco. Carnes, who was 19, was spared the death penalty after some custodial officers who had been taken hostage testified that he had refrained from following instructions from Cretzer to kill them, but also due to the strong defense of his lawyer, Archer Zamloch.

Although Sam Shockley's lawyer, W. A. Sullivan, pleaded insanity, Sam Shockley and Miran Thompson both received death sentences, to the great disbelief of their lawyers and even the prosecuting U.S. attorney, Hennessy. President Truman, a good friend of Warden Johnston, denied the bid for clemency. Shockley accepted his fate and rejected any further efforts to stay the execution. He and Thompson were executed simultaneously in the San Quentin gas chamber on December 3, 1948. Sam Shockley is buried at Pollard cemetery in Haworth, Oklahoma.

== See also ==
- Capital punishment by the United States federal government
- List of people executed by the United States federal government
- List of people executed in the United States in 1948

== General references ==
- Inside Alcatraz, my time on the rock by Jim Quillen. ISBN 9781784750664
- Alcatraz Justice - The Rock's most famous Murder trial by Ernest B. Lageson. ISBN 088739-408-6
- Battle at Alcatraz - A Desperate Attempt to Escape the Rock by Ernest B. Lageson. ISBN 1-886039-37-2
- https://law.justia.com/cases/federal/appellate-courts/F2/166/704/1475755/ on 2019-03-23
- https://legacy.sfgenealogy.org/sf/history/sfoealcb.htm on 2022-04-20
- http://www.notfrisco2.com/alcatraz/bios/hyoung/hyoung5.html 2019-04-03
