= May 1938 =

Month of 1938

<<	May 1938					>>
Su	Mo	Tu	We	Th	Fr	Sa
1	2	3	4	5	6	7
8	9	10	11	12	13	14
15	16	17	18	19	20	21
22	23	24	25	26	27	28
29	30	31

The following events happened in May 1938:

== May 1, 1938 (Sunday) ==
- Spanish Prime Minister Juan Negrín offered a thirteen-point peace proposal.
- The Battle of Xuzhou ended in Japanese strategic victory.
- Presidential elections were held in Colombia. Eduardo Santos ran unopposed and received 100% of the vote.

== May 2, 1938 (Monday) ==
- Louis Ferdinand of the throneless House of Hohenzollern married Kira Kirillovna of the throneless House of Romanov in Potsdam.
- The British House of Commons approved the Anglo-Italian deal of April 16.
- Born: King Moshoeshoe II of Lesotho, in Morija (d. 1996)

== May 3, 1938 (Tuesday) ==
- Adolf Hitler began a week-long state visit to Italy. He was greeted by Benito Mussolini amid great ceremony.
- Flossenbürg concentration camp took in its first prisoners.
- George VI opened the Empire Exhibition in Glasgow.
- Stanislav Kosior was arrested by the Soviets.
- The "Box Office Poison" article appeared in the Independent Film Journal, naming a number of movie stars who continued to draw high salaries despite making films that underperformed at the box office. Greta Garbo, Marlene Dietrich and Mae West were among those given the undesirable label.

== May 4, 1938 (Wednesday) ==
- The Nationalist faction ordered the reinstatement of the Society of Jesus in Nationalist-held territory. The Jesuits had been ordered to dissolve and their property confiscated by the Spanish government in 1932.
- Pope Pius XI was quoted in L'Osservatore Romano as saying that it was a "sad thing" for "another cross that is not the cross of Christ" to be erected in Rome. This was understood as referring to the swastikas on display around the city in honour of Adolf Hitler's visit.
- The French passenger steamer Lafayette caught on fire in Le Havre and was a total loss.
- Born: Tyrone Davis, blues and soul singer, in Greenville, Mississippi (d. 2005)
- Died: Carl von Ossietzky, 48, German journalist, political activist and Nobel laureate

== May 5, 1938 (Thursday) ==
- Mussolini put on a grand naval review of over 200 warships in the Gulf of Naples to impress Hitler.
- Born: Jerzy Skolimowski, filmmaker and actor, in Łódź, Poland

== May 6, 1938 (Friday) ==
- The Soviet Union announced the appointment of Alexey Merekalov as the new Ambassador to Nazi Germany.
- In the 1939 film The Wizard of Oz, the date on the death certificate of the Wicked Witch of the East is May 6, 1938. This was the 19th anniversary of the death of L. Frank Baum, the author of The Wonderful Wizard of Oz book, on May 6, 1919.
- Born: Larry Gogan, broadcaster, in Dublin, Ireland (d. 2020); Haryono Suyono, Indonesian national Family Planning Coordination Body and the helper of 2nd president of Indonesia, Soeharto.

== May 7, 1938 (Saturday) ==
- Ambassadors from Britain and France opened a discussion in Prague on Sudeten Germans. They advised Czechoslovakia to make greater concessions to ethnic Germans within its borders.
- Nine high justices were dismissed from the Austrian Supreme Court and replaced with Nazis.
- Lawrin won the Kentucky Derby.
- Salford defeated Barrow 7–4 to win rugby's Challenge Cup in front of 51,243 people at Wembley Stadium. It's the only Challenge Cup win in Salford's history.

== May 8, 1938 (Sunday) ==
- Nazi-controlled authorities in Austria issued a warrant for the arrest of Archduke Felix, accusing him of stealing silverware and linen from the Theresian Military Academy where he was a cadet.
- Olympique de Marseille defeated FC Metz 2–1 in the Coupe de France Final.

== May 9, 1938 (Monday) ==
- Hitler ended his state visit to Italy with a day of sightseeing in Florence with Mussolini.
- Archduke Albrecht Franz, Duke of Teschen lost his place in the House of Habsburg for marrying a commoner.
- An editorial in Mussolini's newspaper Il Popolo d'Italia fired back at the pope's recent statement by saying it was "very dangerous to speak of and wave the cross of Christ as if it were a weapon."
- Tybee National Wildlife Refuge was established in Jasper County, South Carolina by an executive order of President Roosevelt.
- Born: Wojciech Leśnikowski, architect, in Lublin, Poland (d. 2014)
- Died: Thomas B. Thrige, 72, Danish industrialist

== May 10, 1938 (Tuesday) ==
- The Japanese began the Amoy Operation to blockade China.
- An underground explosion at the Markham Colliery in Duckmanton, England killed 79 men.

== May 11, 1938 (Wednesday) ==
- The Brazilian government suppressed an uprising by the Integralistam, an organization with connections to the German government that was strongly supported by ethnic Germans living in southern Brazil.
- Portugal formally recognized Francoist Spain.
- The Rodgers and Hart stage musical I Married an Angel premiered at the Shubert Theatre on Broadway.
- Born: Fritz-Albert Popp, biophysicist, in Frankfurt am Main, Germany (d. 2018)

== May 12, 1938 (Thursday) ==
- The Amoy Operation ended with Japanese control of Amoy.
- Germany recognized Manchukuo.
- Born: Luana Anders, actress, in New York City (d. 1996)

== May 13, 1938 (Friday) ==
- Mexico severed diplomatic ties with Britain over London's demands for a settlement of claims arising from the Mexican nationalization of foreign-owned oil properties.
- Died: Charles Édouard Guillaume, 77, Swiss physicist and Nobel laureate

== May 14, 1938 (Saturday) ==
- Béla Imrédy became Prime Minister of Hungary.
- German tennis star Gottfried von Cramm was convicted of immorality and sentenced to one year in prison for homosexual relations with a Jew.
- The swashbuckler film The Adventures of Robin Hood starring Errol Flynn, Olivia de Havilland, Basil Rathbone and Claude Rains was released.
- Dauber won the Preakness Stakes.

== May 15, 1938 (Sunday) ==
- Paul-Henri Spaak became Prime Minister of Belgium, the country's first socialist leader.

== May 16, 1938 (Monday) ==
- The Vatican and the Francoist State made arrangements to exchange diplomatic representatives, completing the Vatican's formal recognition of Franco.
- The U.S. Supreme Court decided NLRB v. Mackay Radio & Telegraph Co.
- Died: Lewis Bayly, 80, British admiral

== May 17, 1938 (Tuesday) ==
- The Eire (Confirmation of Agreements) Act received Royal Assent.
- The Charing Cross (District line) tube crash occurred, killing 6 people.
- The Naval Act of 1938 was enacted in the United States.
- Half the city of Cardiff was sold for £20 million in the biggest property deal in British history. The property came from the estate of the Marquess of Bute.
- The radio quiz show Information Please premiered on NBC.
- Born: Jason Bernard, actor, in Chicago (d. 1996)

== May 18, 1938 (Wednesday) ==
- A general election was held in South Africa, won by the United Party.
- Born: Janet Fish, Realist painter, in Boston, Massachusetts (d. 2025)

== May 19, 1938 (Thursday) ==
- 5,000 marched in an anti-Nazi demonstration through the streets of Prague.

== May 20, 1938 (Friday) ==
- May Crisis: Czechoslovak President Edvard Beneš ordered a partial mobilization in reaction to reports of suspicious German troop movements.
- The Nuremberg Laws went into effect in annexed Austria.
- The Japanese captured Xuzhou.
- The French playwrights Henri Bernstein and Édouard Bourdet fought an épée duel after feuding with each other for years. Jean-Joseph Renaud refereed the duel and declared Bernstein the winner after Bourdet was nicked in the arm.

== May 21, 1938 (Saturday) ==
- In Meridian, Mississippi, the General Assembly of the Presbyterian Church of the United States voted 151–130 to omit a passage from the church code saying that "some men and angels are predestined unto everlasting life and others fore-ordained to everlasting death", and that their numbers could not be changed.
- The Bertolt Brecht play Fear and Misery of the Third Reich premiered in Paris.
- Died: Silver King, 70, American baseball player

== May 22, 1938 (Sunday) ==
- British Foreign Secretary Lord Halifax told the French ambassador not to count on British support in the event of a war over Czechoslovakia. Poland's ambassador also told French Foreign Secretary Georges Bonnet that Poland would not move if France moved against Germany to defend Czechoslovakia.
- The Stromboli volcano in the Tyrrhenian Sea erupted spectacularly.
- Born: Richard Benjamin, actor and director, in New York City
- Died: William Glackens, 68, American painter

== May 23, 1938 (Monday) ==
- The May Crisis passed when Germany denied any planned aggression against Czechoslovakia.
- Rufus Franklin, Thomas R. Limerick and James C. Lucas took part in the third documented escape attempt from Alcatraz Prison. A guard shot Limerick (who soon died) and Franklin and the escape attempt was foiled.
- The U.S. Supreme Court decided Johnson v. Zerbst.
- Died: Thomas R. Limerick, 36, American criminal (shot); Frederick Ruple, 66, Swiss-American painter

== May 24, 1938 (Tuesday) ==
- A curfew was imposed in Jerusalem following riots.
- Hungary enacted antisemitic legislation.

== May 25, 1938 (Wednesday) ==
- The Aviazione Legionaria carried out the Bombing of Alicante.
- The 34th Eucharistic Congress opened in Budapest.
- Hitler had the small Austrian town of Braunau am Inn, his birthplace, designated a city.

== May 26, 1938 (Thursday) ==
- Hitler laid the cornerstone for a new Volkswagen plant in the Fallersleben district of Wolfsburg. Mass production was projected to begin there by the end of 1939.
- Born: William Bolcom, composer and pianist, in Seattle, Washington; Pauline Parker, murderer, in Christchurch, New Zealand; Teresa Stratas, operatic soprano, in Toronto, Canada
- Died: John Jacob Abel, 81, American biochemist and pharmacologist

== May 27, 1938 (Friday) ==
- Éamon de Valera called an Irish general election.

== May 28, 1938 (Saturday) ==
- The 1,495 ton British steamer Greatend was bombed and sunk by Nationalist warplanes at the dock of Valencia. 10 were killed and 18 wounded in bombing of the city itself.
- Born: Jerry West, basketball player, in Chelyan, West Virginia (d. 2024)

== May 29, 1938 (Sunday) ==
- The Balaguer Offensive ended in Republican failure.
- Giovanni Valetti of Italy won the 26th Giro d'Italia.

== May 30, 1938 (Monday) ==
- Floyd Roberts won the Indianapolis 500.
- Died: Anton Lang, 63, German stage actor

== May 31, 1938 (Tuesday) ==
- The Aviazione Legionaria carried out the Bombing of Granollers.
- Francisco Franco staged a review of his navy at Vinaròs.
- Henry Armstrong defeated Barney Ross by judges' decision at Madison Square Garden Bowl in Queens, New York to win the world welterweight boxing title.
- The U.S. Supreme Court decided Collins v. Yosemite Park & Curry Co. and In re NLRB.
- BBC Television broadcast its first-ever game show, called Spelling Bee.
- Born: Johnny Paycheck, country singer, in Greenfield, Ohio (d. 2003); Peter Yarrow, folk singer (Peter, Paul and Mary), in Manhattan, New York (d. 2025)
