= April 1938 =

Month of 1938

<<	April 1938					>>
Su	Mo	Tu	We	Th	Fr	Sa
					1	2
3	4	5	6	7	8	9
10	11	12	13	14	15	16
17	18	19	20	21	22	23
24	25	26	27	28	29	30

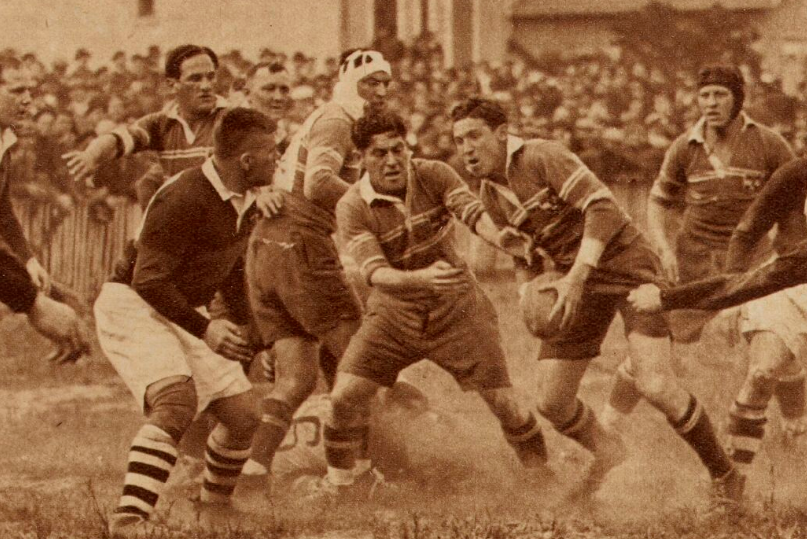
The 1938 Toulouse Olympics

The following events occurred in April 1938:

== April 1, 1938 (Friday) ==
- The Battle of Gandesa began.
- Upper and Lower Silesia were reunified into the Province of Silesia.
- L'Osservatore Romano stated that the Vatican had not been consulted by Austrian bishops prior to their reading of the March 27 pastoral letter supporting the Anschluss.
- U.S.-Mexican relations continued to worsen as the Roosevelt Administration ended its policy of buying Mexican silver at rates above world price.
- Music recordings by Jewish musicians and composers were banned in Germany.
- Joe Louis knocked out Harry Thomas in the fifth round at Chicago Stadium to retain the world heavyweight boxing title.
- Born: John Quade, actor, in Kansas City, Kansas (d. 2009)
- Died: Louis-Henri Foreau, 71 or 72, French artist

== April 2, 1938 (Saturday) ==
- The Australian Labor Party won a third term in the Queensland state election.
- Three days of parliamentary elections concluded in Egypt. Prime Minister Muhammad Mahmoud Pasha's party won a majority of seats.
- Oxford won the 90th Boat Race. It was the first Boat Race to be televised.
- Born: John Larsson, 17th General of the Salvation Army, in Sweden (d. 2022)

== April 3, 1938 (Sunday) ==
- The Battle of Gandesa ended in Nationalist victory.
- The Nationalists took Lleida.
- Born: Jeff Barry, pop music songwriter and producer, in Brooklyn, New York
- Died: Count Campau, 74, American baseball player

== April 4, 1938 (Monday) ==
- The collective series of battles known as the Battle of the Segre began.
- Italy began to transfer its Aegean Sea fleet base from Leros to Rhodes.
- Byron Nelson won the 5th Masters Tournament.
- Eleanor Roosevelt, the First Lady of the United States, hosted the White House Conference on Participation of Negro Women and Children in Federal Welfare Programs.
- Born: A. Bartlett Giamatti, President of Yale University and Commissioner of Major League Baseball, in Boston, Massachusetts (d. 1989)

== April 5, 1938 (Tuesday) ==
- Spanish Prime Minister Juan Negrín sacked War Minister Indalecio Prieto.
- The Franco government formally revoked the 1932 Catalan statute of autonomy.

== April 6, 1938 (Wednesday) ==
- American chemist Roy J. Plunkett discovered polytetrafluoroethylene, better known as Teflon.

== April 7, 1938 (Thursday) ==
- The Battle of Taierzhuang ended in a Chinese victory.
- The Nationalists captured Tremp.
- The drama-adventure film The Adventures of Marco Polo starring Gary Cooper premiered in New York.
- Born: Spencer Dryden, rock drummer, in New York City (d. 2005); Freddie Hubbard, jazz trumpeter, in Indianapolis, Indiana (d. 2008)

== April 8, 1938 (Friday) ==
- Léon Blum resigned as Prime Minister of France when his budget was defeated.
- Walter Piston's Symphony No. 1 was premiered by the Boston Symphony Orchestra conducted by Piston himself.
- Born: Kofi Annan, diplomat and Secretary-General of the United Nations, in Comassie, Gold Coast (d. 2018)
- Died: Joe "King" Oliver, 56, jazz cornet player and bandleader
- Died: George Mountbatten, 2nd Marquess of Milford Haven, 45, British Royal Navy officer and nobelman, brother of Lord Mountbatten and uncle to Prince Philip, Duke of Edinburgh

== April 9, 1938 (Saturday) ==
- Hitler spoke in Vienna to a national audience on the eve of the referendum on the Anschluss, making a final appeal to vote in its favour.
- Born: Viktor Chernomyrdin, politician, in Chernyi Otrog, USSR (d. 2010); Don Meredith, NFL quarterback, sports commentator and actor, in Mount Vernon, Texas (d. 2010); Rockin' Sidney, zydeco musician, in Lebeau, Louisiana (d. 1998)

== April 10, 1938 (Sunday) ==
- Parliamentary elections were held in Nazi Germany. The Nazi Party claimed 99% of the vote.
- The referendum on the Anschluss was held. The result was reported as 99.73% in favour.
- Édouard Daladier became Prime Minister of France for the third time.
- An estimated 7,000 people attended a "Save Spain" rally in Hyde Park protesting the British government's policy on the Civil War. Unity Mitford was spotted at the event wearing a swastika badge and was attacked by an angry mob.

== April 11, 1938 (Monday) ==
- 23-year old Jackie Coogan sued his mother and stepfather for $4 million worth of property and assets he'd earned as a child film star.
- The U.S. Supreme Court decided Hale v. Kentucky.
- Born: Michael Deaver, political consultant, in Bakersfield, California (d. 2007); Kurt Moll, operatic singer, in Buir, Germany (d. 2017)
- Died: Cristóbal Torriente, 44, Cuban baseball player

== April 12, 1938 (Tuesday) ==
- The Spanish Republicans launched the Balaguer Offensive.
- The Chicago Black Hawks defeated the Toronto Maple Leafs 4-1 to win the Stanley Cup, three games to one.
- Born: Roger Caron, robber and memoirist, in Cornwall, Ontario, Canada (d. 2012)
- Died: Feodor Chaliapin, 65, Russian opera singer

== April 13, 1938 (Wednesday) ==
- The French Senate voted 288-1 to give Prime Minister Daladier special powers until July 31 to govern by decree in order to address the currency devaluation crisis and end strikes.
- The Chinese announced the recapture of Qufu.
- Born: Frederic Rzewski, composer and pianist, in Westfield, Massachusetts (d. 2021)

== April 14, 1938 (Thursday) ==
- The Battle of Bielsa pocket began.
- U.S. President Franklin D. Roosevelt gave a fireside chat on economic conditions.
- Died: Gillis Grafström, 44, Swedish figure skater

== April 15, 1938 (Friday) ==
- The Nationalists reached the coastal town of Vinaròs and cut Republican Spain into two halves.
- The drama film Test Pilot starring Clark Gable, Myrna Loy and Spencer Tracy premiered in New York and Los Angeles.
- Born: Claudia Cardinale, actress, in Tunis, Tunisia (d. 2025)

== April 16, 1938 (Saturday) ==
- Britain and Italy concluded the Easter Accords, a pact to reduce tensions in the Mediterranean region. The British recognized the Italian conquest of Ethiopia while Italy promised to withdraw its troops from Spain at the end of the Civil War and refrain from spreading propaganda in the Middle East.
- Between 16 and 20 Arabs were killed in a battle with British troops at Jenin fought after three Jews were killed in an ambush at al-Bassa.
- Swiss chemist Albert Hofmann accidentally discovered lysergic acid diethylamide (LSD).
- Died: Steve Bloomer, 64, English footballer

== April 17, 1938 (Sunday) ==
- On Easter Sunday, Pope Pius XI canonized Andrew Bobola, Salvador of Horta and John Leonardi as saints.
- Born: Kerry Wendell Thornley, co-founder of Discordianism, in Los Angeles (d. 1998)

== April 18, 1938 (Monday) ==
- Action Comics #1 published by Detective Comics, Inc. premiered on American newsstands bearing a cover date of June 1938. The iconic cover marks the first appearance of Superman, created by Jerry Siegel and Joe Shuster and for that reason is considered the beginning of the superhero genre.
- Peter Whitehead won the Australian Grand Prix.
- Joe Gordon made his major league debut on the New York Yankees, going 0-for-4 against the Boston Red Sox.

== April 19, 1938 (Tuesday) ==
- The Aragon Offensive ended in a Nationalist victory.
- The Romanian government began a crackdown on the Iron Guard, rounding up hundreds of members of the far-right organization.
- An earthquake centred in Kırşehir, Turkey killed 224 people.
- Czechoslovakia recognized the Italian conquest of Ethiopia.
- Les Pawson won the Boston Marathon.
- Enos Slaughter made his major league debut on the St. Louis Cardinals, going 3-for-5 against the Pittsburgh Pirates.
- Born: Stanley Fish, literary theorist and legal scholar, in Providence, Rhode Island

== April 20, 1938 (Wednesday) ==
- After holding out for all of spring training and missing Opening Day, Joe DiMaggio accepted a salary offer of $25,000 from the New York Yankees – a $10,000 raise over his 1937 salary. DiMaggio had been holding out for $40,000 but Yankees owner Jacob Ruppert never budged from his first offer.
- The Leni Riefenstahl-directed documentary film Olympia premiered in Germany.
- The comedy-mystery film There's Always a Woman starring Joan Blondell and Melvyn Douglas was released.
- Born: Peter Snow, radio and television presenter and historian, in Dublin, Ireland; Eszter Tamási, actress and television announcer, in Mezőtúr, Hungary (d. 1991)

== April 21, 1938 (Thursday) ==
- Habsburg property was confiscated by the Nazi government in Austria.
- Douglas Hyde was elected Ireland's first president.
- The 1938 Detroit Red Wings–Montreal Canadiens European tour began in Earls Court. The two hockey teams would play a total of nine exhibition games in England over the next three weeks.
- Died: Muhammad Iqbal, 60, Indian poet, philosopher and politician

== April 22, 1938 (Friday) ==
- Japan paid over $2 million in compensation for December's USS Panay incident.
- Nazi Germany decreed that Jewish-owned businesses were forbidden from changing their names.
- Born: Alan Bond, English-born Australian businessman, in Hammersmith, London (d. 2015); Issey Miyake, fashion designer, in Hiroshima, Japan (d. 2022); Adam Raphael, journalist and author, in England

== April 23, 1938 (Saturday) ==
- René Dreyfus of France won the Cork Grand Prix motor race.
- East Fife and Kilmarnock played to a 1–1 draw in the 1938 Scottish Cup Final. A rematch was scheduled for Wednesday.
- Died: Stefan Drzewiecki, 93, Polish scientist, engineer and inventor

== April 24, 1938 (Sunday) ==
- Konstantin Päts became the 1st President of Estonia.
- Sudeten German leader Konrad Henlein presented a list of demands in a speech in Karlsbad. The principal demand was the creation of an autonomous German state within Czechoslovakia. Though left unsaid, it was readily inferred that this state could then vote to secede and join Germany.

== April 25, 1938 (Monday) ==
- The George Orwell book Homage to Catalonia was published.
- A decree from Hermann Göring was published stating that effective immediately, Austrian banknotes would no longer be valid currency. A deadline of December 31, 1938 was given to exchange them at the Reichsbank for Reichsmarks. Austrian coinage remained valid for the time being.
- Great Britain and Ireland agreed to end the Anglo-Irish Trade War.
- The U.S. Supreme Court decided Erie Railroad Co. v. Tompkins, Hinderlider v. La Plata River & Cherry Creek Ditch Co., United States v. Carolene Products Co. and United States v. Shoshone Tribe of Indians.
- Died: Aleksander Świętochowski, 89, Polish writer and philosopher

== April 26, 1938 (Tuesday) ==
- On Budget Day in the United Kingdom, Chancellor of the Exchequer Sir John Simon introduced the biggest peacetime budget in the nation's history. Taxes on income, gasoline and tea were increased to help pay for the national rearmament program.
- Nazi Germany enacted the Order for the Disclosure of Jewish Assets, requiring Jews to report all property in excess of 5,000 Reichsmarks.
- 26 people died in riots in Mysore.
- Born: Duane Eddy, guitarist, in Corning, New York (d. 2024); Maurice Williams, lead singer of Maurice Williams and the Zodiacs, in Lancaster, South Carolina
- Died: Edmund Husserl, 79, German philosopher

== April 27, 1938 (Wednesday) ==
- King Zog of Albania married Countess Géraldine Apponyi de Nagy-Appony in Tirana.
- Greece and Turkey signed a treaty of friendship.
- East Fife defeated Kilmarnock 4-2 to win the 1937-38 Scottish Cup in a rematch after Sunday's draw.

== April 28, 1938 (Thursday) ==
- Wisconsin Governor Philip La Follette announced the formation of a new third party, the National Progressive Party of America. This party would fizzle after La Follette's defeat in the gubernatorial election later that year.

== April 29, 1938 (Friday) ==
- DEST (Deutsche Erd- und Steinwerke GmbH or German Earth & Stone Works Company) was established in Germany.
- The comedy film College Swing starring George Burns, Gracie Allen, Martha Raye and Bob Hope was released.
- Born: Bernie Madoff, businessman convicted of fraud, in Queens, New York (d. 2021)

== April 30, 1938 (Saturday) ==
- Preston North End defeated Huddersfield Town 1-0 in the FA Cup Final at Wembley Stadium. It was the first FA Cup final to be televised.
- Joe DiMaggio was booed in Washington, D.C. during his first game back after ending his salary dispute with the Yankees. Fans considered DiMaggio greedy for demanding such a big raise while ordinary people were struggling through the Great Depression, and they would continue to boo him throughout the season both on the road and at home in Yankee Stadium.
- The animated short film Porky's Hare Hunt was released, marking the first appearance of an unnamed rabbit character that would evolve over the course of later cartoons into Bugs Bunny.
- Born: Larry Niven, science fiction writer, in Los Angeles
