= List of United States Supreme Court cases, volume 304 =

Supreme Court of the United States
- Interactive map of Supreme Court of the United States
- 38°53′26″N 77°00′16″W
- Established: March 4, 1789; 236 years ago
- Location: Washington, D.C.
- Coordinates: 38°53′26″N 77°00′16″W
- Composition method: Presidential nomination with Senate confirmation
- Authorised by: Constitution of the United States, Art. III, § 1
- Judge term length: life tenure, subject to impeachment and removal
- Number of positions: 9 (by statute)
- Website: supremecourt.gov

This is a list of cases reported in volume 304 of United States Reports, decided by the Supreme Court of the United States in 1938.

== Justices of the Supreme Court at the time of volume 304 U.S. ==
The Supreme Court is established by Article III, Section 1 of the Constitution of the United States, which says: "The judicial Power of the United States, shall be vested in one supreme Court . . .". The size of the Court is not specified; the Constitution leaves it to Congress to set the number of justices. Under the Judiciary Act of 1789 Congress originally fixed the number of justices at six (one chief justice and five associate justices). Since 1789 Congress has varied the size of the Court from six to seven, nine, ten, and back to nine justices (always including one chief justice).

When the cases in volume 304 were decided the Court comprised the following nine members:

Portrait	Justice	Office	Home State	Succeeded	Date confirmed by the Senate (Vote)	Tenure on Supreme Court
	Charles Evans Hughes	Chief Justice	New York	William Howard Taft	February 13, 1930 (52–26)	February 24, 1930 – June 30, 1941 (Retired)
	James Clark McReynolds	Associate Justice	Tennessee	Horace Harmon Lurton	August 29, 1914 (44–6)	October 12, 1914 – January 31, 1941 (Retired)
	Louis Brandeis	Associate Justice	Massachusetts	Joseph Rucker Lamar	June 1, 1916 (47–22)	June 5, 1916 – February 13, 1939 (Retired)
	Pierce Butler	Associate Justice	Minnesota	William R. Day	December 21, 1922 (61–8)	January 2, 1923 – November 16, 1939 (Died)
	Harlan F. Stone	Associate Justice	New York	Joseph McKenna	February 5, 1925 (71–6)	March 2, 1925 – July 2, 1941 (Continued as chief justice)
	Owen Roberts	Associate Justice	Pennsylvania	Edward Terry Sanford	May 20, 1930 (Acclamation)	June 2, 1930 – July 31, 1945 (Resigned)
	Benjamin N. Cardozo	Associate Justice	New York	Oliver Wendell Holmes Jr.	February 24, 1932 (Acclamation)	March 14, 1932 – July 9, 1938 (Died)
	Hugo Black	Associate Justice	Alabama	Willis Van Devanter	August 17, 1937 (63–16)	August 19, 1937 – September 17, 1971 (Retired)
	Stanley Forman Reed	Associate Justice	Kentucky	George Sutherland	January 25, 1938 (Acclamation)	January 31, 1938 – February 25, 1957 (Retired)

== Notable Cases in 304 U.S. ==
=== Erie Railroad Company v. Tompkins ===
Erie Railroad Company v. Tompkins, 304 U.S. 64 (1938), is a landmark U.S. Supreme Court decision in which the Court held that there is no general American federal common law and that U.S. federal courts must apply state law, not federal law, to lawsuits between parties from different states that do not involve federal questions. In reaching this holding, the Court overturned almost a century of federal civil procedure case law, and established the foundation of what remains the modern law of diversity jurisdiction as it applies to United States federal courts. Although the decision is not widely known by laypeople, most American lawyers and legal scholars regard Erie as one of the most important decisions in U.S. Supreme Court history. The decision "goes to the heart" of the American system of federalism and the relationship between the U.S. federal government and the states.

=== Hinderlider, State Engineer v. La Plata River and Cherry Creek Ditch Company ===
In Hinderlider, State Engineer v. La Plata River and Cherry Creek Ditch Company, 304 U.S. 92 (1938), the Supreme Court ruled that a "general common law" or "general federal common law" no longer exists in the American legal system. Federal courts, however, retain the power to create federal common law in specific areas related to federal rights and interests (e.g., the interpretation of an interstate compact governing water rights between states.

=== United States v. Carolene Products Company ===
In United States v. Carolene Products Company, 304 U.S. 144 (1938), the Supreme Court upheld the federal government's power to prohibit filled milk from being shipped in interstate commerce. In his majority opinion for the Court, Associate Justice Harlan F. Stone wrote that economic regulations were "presumptively constitutional" under a deferential standard of review known as the "rational basis test". The case is most notable for Footnote Four, in which Stone wrote that the Court would exercise a stricter standard of review when a law appears on its face to violate a provision of the United States Constitution, restricts the political process in a way that could impede the repeal of an undesirable law, or discriminates against "discrete and insular" minorities. Footnote Four would influence later Supreme Court decisions, and the higher standard of review is now known as "strict scrutiny".

=== National Labor Relations Board v. Mackay Radio and Telegraph Company ===
In National Labor Relations Board v. Mackay Radio and Telegraph Company, 304 U.S. 333 (1938), the Supreme Court held that workers who strike remain employees for the purposes of the National Labor Relations Act (NLRA). The Court granted the relief sought by the National Labor Relations Board, which sought to have the workers reinstated by the employer. However, the decision is much better known today for its obiter dicta in which the Court said that an employer may hire strikebreakers and is not bound to discharge any of them if or when the strike ends. The Mackay doctrine, as the striker replacement portion of the ruling is known, is one of the most significant Supreme Court rulings in American labor law, and has defined collective bargaining in the United States since its publication. "Mackay Radio was more than a decision that provided an instrumental method for a firm to replace economic strikers and to resist their return to employment after a strike. It was also a decision that established important practices that constituted the conduct of union-management bargaining during the post-New Deal Era." The ruling is also highly controversial, even more than 80 years later. It is strongly and uniformly condemned by labor unions, and resolutely defended by employers. Among academics in the political sciences and other related disciplines, "the doctrine continues to provoke the notice and the nearly universal condemnation of scholars."

=== Johnson v. Zerbst ===
In Johnson v. Zerbst, 304 U.S. 458 (1938), the Supreme Court held that defendants have the right to be represented by an attorney unless they waive their right to counsel knowing full well the potential consequences. The case, however, only made this right applicable to federal defendants and did not extend to defendants in trials under state jurisdiction. Assistance of counsel was held to be requisite to due process of law in state felony proceedings with the Gideon v. Wainwright decision in 1963.

== Federal court system ==
Under the Judiciary Act of 1789 the federal court structure at the time comprised District Courts, which had general trial jurisdiction; Circuit Courts, which had mixed trial and appellate (from the US District Courts) jurisdiction; and the United States Supreme Court, which had appellate jurisdiction over the federal District and Circuit courts—and for certain issues over state courts. The Supreme Court also had limited original jurisdiction (i.e., in which cases could be filed directly with the Supreme Court without first having been heard by a lower federal or state court). There were one or more federal District Courts and/or Circuit Courts in each state, territory, or other geographical region.

The Judiciary Act of 1891 created the United States Courts of Appeals and reassigned the jurisdiction of most routine appeals from the district and circuit courts to these appellate courts. The Act created nine new courts that were originally known as the "United States Circuit Courts of Appeals." The new courts had jurisdiction over most appeals of lower court decisions. The Supreme Court could review either legal issues that a court of appeals certified or decisions of court of appeals by writ of certiorari. On January 1, 1912, the effective date of the Judicial Code of 1911, the old Circuit Courts were abolished, with their remaining trial court jurisdiction transferred to the U.S. District Courts.

== List of cases in volume 304 U.S. ==
Case name	Citation	Opinion of the Court	Vote	Concurring opinion or statement	Dissenting opinion or statement	Procedural jurisdiction	Result
Morgan v. United States	304 U.S. 1 (1938)	Hughes	6-1[a][b]	none	Black (without opinion)	appeal from the United States District Court for the Western District of Missouri (W.D. Mo.)	reversed; petition for rehearing denied
United States v. Bekins	304 U.S. 27 (1938)	Hughes	6-2[a]	none	McReynolds and Butler (joint short statement)	appeals from the United States District Court for the District of California (S.D. Cal.)	reversed
Interstate Circuit, Inc. v. United States	304 U.S. 55 (1938)	per curiam	6-2[a]	none	Stone and Black (joint short statement)	appeal from the United States District Court for the Northern District of Texas (N.D. Tex.)	reversed
Baltimore and Ohio Railroad Company v. United States	304 U.S. 58 (1938)	McReynolds	7-0[a][c]	none	none	appeal from the United States District Court for the Northern District of Illinois (N.D. Ill.)	affirmed
Arkansas Louisiana Gas Company v. Department of Public Utilities of Arkansas	304 U.S. 61 (1938)	McReynolds	8-0[a]	none	none	appeal from the Arkansas Supreme Court (Ark.)	affirmed
Erie Railroad Company v. Tompkins	304 U.S. 64 (1938)	Brandeis	6-2[a]	Reed (opinion)	Butler (opinion, agreeing with the result but dissenting on the grounds; with which McReynolds concurred)	certiorari to the United States Court of Appeals for the Second Circuit (2d Cir.)	reversed
Hinderlider, State Engineer v. La Plata River and Cherry Creek Ditch Company	304 U.S. 92 (1938)	Brandeis	8-0[a]	none	none	appeal from the Colorado Supreme Court (Colo.)	reversed
United States v. Shoshone Tribe	304 U.S. 111 (1938)	Butler	6-1[a][d]	none	Reed (without opinion)	certiorari to the United States Court of Claims (Ct. Cl.)	affirmed
United States v. Klamath and Moadoc Tribes	304 U.S. 119 (1938)	Butler	6-0[a][b][d]	Black (without opinion)	none	appeal from the United States Court of Claims (Ct. Cl.)	affirmed
Guaranty Trust Company v. United States	304 U.S. 126 (1938)	Stone	7-0[a][b]	none	none	certiorari to the United States Court of Appeals for the Second Circuit (2d Cir.)	remanded for further proceedings
United States v. Carolene Products Company	304 U.S. 144 (1938)	Stone	6-1[a][b]	Black (without opinion); Butler (opinion)	McReynolds (without opinion)	appeal from the United States District Court for the Southern District of Illinois (S.D. Ill.)	reversed
United States v. Pan American Petroleum Corporation	304 U.S. 156 (1938)	Roberts	7-0[a][b]	none	none	appeal from the United States District Court for the Eastern District of Louisiana (E.D. La.)	reversed
Crown Cork and Seal Company v. Ferdinand Gutmann Company	304 U.S. 159 (1938)	Butler	6-1[a][b]	none	Black (opinion)	certiorari to the United States Court of Appeals for the Second Circuit (2d Cir.)	reversed
General Talking Pictures Corporation v. Western Electric Company	304 U.S. 175 (1938)	Butler	5-1[a][b][e]	none	Black (opinion)	certiorari to the United States Court of Appeals for the Second Circuit (2d Cir.)	affirmed
Pacific National Company v. Welch	304 U.S. 191 (1938)	Butler	7-0[a][b]	none	none	certiorari to the United States Court of Appeals for the Ninth Circuit (9th Cir.)	affirmed
United States v. Kaplan	304 U.S. 195 (1938)	Butler	7-0[a][b]	none	none	certiorari to the United States Court of Claims (Ct. Cl.)	reversed
Arkansas Fuel Oil Company v. Louisiana ex rel. Muslow	304 U.S. 197 (1938)	Black	8-0[a]	Stone (without opinion)	none	appeal from the Louisiana Court of Appeal (La. Ct. App.)	affirmed
Ruhlin v. New York Life Insurance Company	304 U.S. 202 (1938)	Reed	8-0[a]	none	none	certiorari to the United States Court of Appeals for the Third Circuit (3d Cir.)	vacated
Petroleum Exploration, Inc. v. Public Service Commission of Kentucky	304 U.S. 209 (1938)	Reed	8-0[a]	McReynolds (without opinion); Stone (short statement)	none	appeal from the United States District Court for the Eastern District of Kentucky (E.D. Ky.)	affirmed
Lone Star Gas Company v. Texas	304 U.S. 224 (1938)	Hughes	7-1[a]	none	Black (without opinion)	appeal from the Texas Court of Civil Appeals (Tex. Ct. App.)	reversed
International Ladies Garment Workers Union v. Donnelly Garment Company	304 U.S. 243 (1938)	per curiam	8-0[a]	none	none	appeal from the United States District Court for the Western District of Missouri (W.D. Mo.)	vacated
California Water Service Company v. City of Redding	304 U.S. 252 (1938)	per curiam	8-0[a]	none	none	appeal from the United States District Court for the Northern District of California (N.D. Cal.)	affirmed
Federal Trade Commission v. Goodyear Tire and Rubber Company	304 U.S. 257 (1938)	per curiam	6-0[a][b][d]	none	none	certiorari to the United States Court of Appeals for the Sixth Circuit (6th Cir.)	reversed
New York Life Insurance Company v. Jackson	304 U.S. 261 (1938)	per curiam	8-0[a]	none	none	certiorari to the United States Court of Appeals for the Seventh Circuit (7th Cir.)	vacated
Rosenthal v. New York Life Insurance Company	304 U.S. 263 (1938)	per curiam	8-0[a]	none	none	certiorari to the United States Court of Appeals for the Eighth Circuit (8th Cir.)	vacated
Lang v. Commissioner of Internal Revenue	304 U.S. 264 (1938)	McReynolds	8-0[a]	none	none	certified questions from the United States Court of Appeals for the Ninth Circuit (9th Cir.)	certified questions answered
Heiner v. Mellon	304 U.S. 271 (1938)	Brandeis	7-0[a][b]	none	none	certiorari to the United States Court of Appeals for the Third Circuit (3d Cir.)	reversed
Helvering, Commissioner of Internal Revenue v. National Grocery Company	304 U.S. 282 (1938)	Brandeis	5-2[a][b]	none	McReynolds and Butler (without opinions)	certiorari to the United States Court of Appeals for the Third Circuit (3d Cir.)	reversed
St. Louis, Brownsville and Mexico Railway Company v. Brownsville Navigation District	304 U.S. 295 (1938)	Butler	8-0[a]	none	none	certiorari to the United States Court of Appeals for the Fifth Circuit (5th Cir.)	reversed
Lowe Brothers Company v. United States	304 U.S. 302 (1938)	Stone	8-0[a]	none	none	certiorari to the United States Court of Appeals for the Sixth Circuit (6th Cir.)	affirmed
J.D. Adams Manufacturing Company v. Storen, Chief Administrative Officer	304 U.S. 307 (1938)	Roberts	6-2[a]	none	McReynolds (without opinion, dissenting in part); Black (opinion, dissenting in part)	appeal from the Indiana Supreme Court (Ind.)	affirmed in part, and reversed in part
National Labor Relations Board v. Mackay Radio and Telegraph Company	304 U.S. 333 (1938)	Roberts	7-0[a][b]	none	none	certiorari to the United States Court of Appeals for the Ninth Circuit (9th Cir.)	reversed
Taft v. Commissioner of Internal Revenue	304 U.S. 351 (1938)	Roberts	8-0[a]	none	none	certiorari to the United States Court of Appeals for the Sixth Circuit (6th Cir.)	affirmed
Zerbst v. Kidwell	304 U.S. 359 (1938)	Black	7-0[a][b]	none	none	certiorari to the United States Court of Appeals for the Fifth Circuit (5th Cir.)	reversed
General Electric Company v. Wabash Appliance Corporation	304 U.S. 364 (1938)	Reed	8-0[a]	none	none	certiorari to the United States Court of Appeals for the Second Circuit (2d Cir.)	affirmed
Federal Power Commission v. Metropolitan Edison Company	304 U.S. 375 (1938)	Hughes	7-0[a][e]	none	none	certiorari to the United States Court of Appeals for the Third Circuit (3d Cir.)	reversed
Oklahoma ex rel. Johnson v. Cook	304 U.S. 387 (1938)	Hughes	8-0[a]	none	none	original jurisdiction	motion for leave to file complaint denied
Hudson v. Moonier	304 U.S. 397 (1938)	per curiam	8-0[a]	none	none	certiorari to the United States Court of Appeals for the Eighth Circuit (8th Cir.)	reversed
Laclede Gas Light Company v. Missouri Public Service Commission	304 U.S. 398 (1938)	per curiam	8-0[a]	none	none	appeal from the Missouri Supreme Court (Mo.)	dismissed
Mahoney, Liquor Control Commissioner of Minnesota v. Joseph Triner Corporation	304 U.S. 401 (1938)	Brandeis	8-0[a]	Reed (without opinion)	none	appeal from the United States District Court for the District of Minnesota (D. Minn.)	reversed
Helvering, Commissioner of Internal Revenue v. Gerhardt	304 U.S. 405 (1938)	Stone	5-2[a][b]	Black (opinion)	Butler (opinion; with which McReynolds concurred)	certiorari to the United States Court of Appeals for the Second Circuit (2d Cir.)	reversed
Aetna Insurance Company v. United Fruit Company	304 U.S. 430 (1938)	Stone	8-0[a]	none	none	certiorari to the United States Court of Appeals for the Second Circuit (2d Cir.)	affirmed
Allen v. Regents of the University System of Georgia	304 U.S. 439 (1938)	Roberts	6-2[a]	Black (without opinion); Stone (short statement); Reed (opinion)	Butler (opinion; with which McReynolds concurred)	certiorari to the United States Court of Appeals for the Fifth Circuit (5th Cir.)	reversed
Johnson v. Zerbst	304 U.S. 458 (1938)	Black	6-2[a]	Reed (without opinion)	McReynolds (without opinion); Butler (short statement)	certiorari to the United States Court of Appeals for the Fifth Circuit (5th Cir.)	reversed
Denver Union Stock Yard Company v. United States	304 U.S. 470 (1938)	Butler	8-0[a]	Black (without opinion)	none	appeal from the United States District Court for the District of Colorado (D. Colo.)	affirmed
In re National Labor Relations Board	304 U.S. 486 (1938)	Roberts	5-2[a][d]	none	Butler (opinion; with which McReynolds concurred)	Order to show cause to the United States Court of Appeals for the Third Circuit (3d Cir.)	writs of prohibition and mandamus granted
Wright v. Union Central Life Insurance Company	304 U.S. 502 (1938)	Reed	8-0[a]	none	none	certiorari to the United States Court of Appeals for the Seventh Circuit (7th Cir.)	affirmed in part, and reversed in part
Collins v. Yosemite Park and Curry Company	304 U.S. 518 (1938)	Reed	8-0[a]	McReynolds (short statement)	none	appeal from the United States District Court for the Northern District of California (N.D. Cal.)	reversed

[a] Cardozo took no part in the case (Justice Cardozo was seriously ill of heart disease and so missed participating in these cases; he died in July 1938.)
[b] Reed took no part in the case
[c] Black took no part in the case
[d] Stone took no part in the case
[e] Roberts took no part in the case
