= 67th Division (Spain) =

- 67.ª División
- Active: August 1937–March 1939
- Country: Spain
- Allegiance: (Second Spanish Republic) Republican faction
- Branch: Spanish Republican Army
- Type: Infantry
- Size: Division
- Engagements: Spanish Civil War: Battle of Teruel; Battle of Alfambra; Battle of Merida pocket; Levante Offensive

Commanders
- Notable commanders: Fulgencio González Gómez

The 67th Division was a unit of the Spanish Republican Army that existed during the Spanish Civil War, created on the basis of the mixed brigades. It came to be deployed on the fronts of Teruel, Extremadura and Levante.

== History ==
The unit was created at the end of August 1937, in Ciudad Real, formed with recruits from 1930, 1937 and 1938. The command fell to the infantry commander Fulgencio González Gómez. (Note: However, Michael Alpert indicates that at this time the head of the division was the Carabineros Lieutenant Colonel Hilario Fernández Recio.) The new 67th Division, which was formed by the 215th, 216th and 217th mixed brigades, was integrated into the XX Army Corps. The training and instruction of the new unit lasted until the end of 1937, remaining located in the general reserve.

At the beginning of 1938 it was sent to the Teruel front, to reinforce the units that were already fighting there. After its arrival, it replaced the seriously broken 68th Division. During the subsequent Battle of Alfambra, the unit withstood the bulk of the enemy attack, emerging very broken from the fighting. (Note: According to Rafael Casas de la Vega, the 67th Division "was beaten on its entire front.")

It was then sent to the Extremadura front, where it replaced the 45th International Division as the reserve force of the Extremadura Army. In April 1938, two of its brigades, the 216th and 217th, intervened in a small republican offensive in the Talavera de la Reina sector. Until July 1938, the unit remained in Extremadura, when it was replaced by the 68th Division. It was sent as reinforcement to the Levante front, where it was added to XXII Army Corps. Upon arrival, however, the fighting had decreased significantly. During the rest of the war he remained on this front, without taking part in relevant military operations. Towards the end of the war the division was attached to the XIII Army Corps.

== Command ==
Commanders

- Infantry Commander Fulgencio González Gómez;

Commissars

- José Villanueva Márquez, of the CNT;
- Pelayo Tortajada, of the PCE;

Chiefs of Staff

- Cavalry commander Leopoldo Ortega Nieto;

== Order of battle ==
Date	Attached Army Corps	Integrated Mixed Brigades	Battle front
November 1937	XX Army Corps	215th, 216th and 217th	General reserve
April 1938	VIII Army Corps	215th, 216th and 217th	Estremadura
August 1938	XXII Army Corps	16th, 215th and 217th	Levante

== Bibliography ==
- Alpert, Michael (1989). El ejército republicano en la guerra civil (in Spanish). Siglo XXI Editores.
- Álvarez, Santiago (1989). Los comisarios políticos en el Ejército Popular de la República (in Spanish). Ediciós do Castro.
- Bermúdez, Antonio (1992). República y guerra civil: Manzanares (1931-1939) (in Spanish). Diputación de Ciudad Real.
- Casas de la Vega, Rafael (1973). Teruel (in Spanish). Barcelona: L. de Caralt.
- Casas de la Vega, Rafael (1976). Alfambra. La reconquista de Teruel (in Spanish). L. de Caralt.
- Engel, Carlos (1999). Historia de las Brigadas Mixtas del Ejército Popular de la República (in Spanish). Madrid: Almena. ISBN 84-922644-7-0.
- Maldonado, José M.ª (2007). El frente de Aragón. La Guerra Civil en Aragón (1936–1938) (in Spanish). Mira Editores. ISBN 978-84-8465-237-3.
- Martínez Bande, José Manuel (1981). La batalla de Pozoblanco y el cierre de la bolsa de Mérida (in Spanish). Madrid: Editorial San Martín.
- Moreno Gómez, Francisco (1985). La Guerra civil en Córdoba (1936-1939) (in Spanish). Córdoba: Alpuerto.
