= June 1938 =

Month of 1938

<<	June 1938					>>
Su	Mo	Tu	We	Th	Fr	Sa
			1	2	3	4
5	6	7	8	9	10	11
12	13	14	15	16	17	18
19	20	21	22	23	24	25
26	27	28	29	30

The following events occurred in June 1938:

== June 1, 1938 (Wednesday) ==
- British MP Duncan Sandys raised a question in the House of Commons about air-raid defences that relied on secret information. This touched off the "Sandys Affair" when he was threatened with prosecution under the Official Secrets Act.
- Bois Roussel won The Derby. This was the first year the Derby was televised.
- The Bren light machine gun entered service in the British Army.
- Born: Khawar Rizvi, poet, in the Punjab, British India (d. 1981)

== June 2, 1938 (Thursday) ==
- Chile informed the League of Nations of its intent to withdraw from the organization.
- Born: Ron Ely, actor and novelist, in Hereford, Texas (d. 2024); Edda Göring, only child of Hermann Göring, in Berlin, Germany (d. 2018); Gene Michael, baseball player, manager and executive, in Kent, Ohio (d. 2017)
- Died: Nathanael Greene Herreshoff, 90, American naval architect and mechanical engineer

== June 3, 1938 (Friday) ==
- Nazi Germany passed a law allowing for the confiscation of "degenerate art".

== June 4, 1938 (Saturday) ==
- The third FIFA World Cup tournament began in Paris with Germany (including Austrian players) and Switzerland playing to a 1–1 draw. The French crowd jeered the German team when the players made the Nazi salute and threw bottles, eggs and tomatoes at them throughout the match.
- Pasteurized won the Belmont Stakes.

== June 5, 1938 (Sunday) ==
- The famous psychoanalysist Sigmund Freud, 82 and frail, arrived in Paris on the Orient Express, having fled persecution by the Nazis in his homeland of Austria. After a few hours of rest he continued on his way to London where he had been granted asylum.
- Born: Karin Balzer, hurdler, in Magdeburg, Germany (d. 2019)
- Died: Edward Denny Bacon, 77, British philatelist

== June 6, 1938 (Monday) ==
- The Japanese captured Kaifeng.
- Sigmund Freud arrived in London at a rented home near Regent's Park.
- Born: Prince Luiz of Orléans-Braganza, in Mandelieu-la-Napoule, France (d. 2022)

== June 7, 1938 (Tuesday) ==
- The New York television station W2XBS broadcast the first televised Broadway production, Rachel Crothers' Susan and God.
- Sigmund Freud was made a British citizen despite normally requiring five years' residence.
- National Doughnut Day started in the United States.
- A state-run petrochemical brand in Mexico, Pemex was founded.
- Born: Goose Gonsoulin, American football player, in Port Arthur, Texas (d. 2014)

== June 8, 1938 (Wednesday) ==
- The Japanese bombed the city of Canton for the twelfth consecutive day as thousands of Chinese packed railway stations and docks attempting to flee the merciless air raids.
- A general election was held in the Canadian province of Saskatchewan. The Liberal Party lost 12 seats but was still re-elected to another majority.
- Argentina created Flag Day.
- Toei, a Japanese film production and cinema operating founded, as predecessor name was Tokyo Cinema Production.
- Born: Mack Vickery, musician, in Town Creek, Alabama (d. 2004)
- Died: Arturo Alfonso Schomburg, 64, Puerto Rican historian, writer and activist

== June 9, 1938 (Thursday) ==
- The Munich synagogue was destroyed by the Nazis. The congregation was given only a few hours' notice to empty the building.
- Born: Charles Wuorinen, composer, in New York City (d. 2020)

== June 10, 1938 (Friday) ==
- Hollywood Park Racetrack opened.
- Celtic defeated Everton 1-0 to win the Empire Exhibition Trophy, the award for the winner of a special football tournament held in conjunction with the Empire Exhibition in Glasgow.
- Born: Joe McBride, footballer, in Glasgow, Scotland (d. 2012)
- Died: Eugenia Falleni, 62, Italian-born Australian transgender man convicted of murder

== June 11, 1938 (Saturday) ==
- The Battle of Wuhan began.
- An earthquake centred in the North Sea killed 3 people in Belgium.
- Johnny Vander Meer of the Cincinnati Reds pitched a 3-0 no-hitter against the Boston Bees.
- Ralph Guldahl won the U.S. Open.
- The movie musical Gold Diggers in Paris starring Rudy Vallée and Rosemary Lane was released.

== June 12, 1938 (Sunday) ==
- The Japanese captured Ankang.
- The Sudeten German Party made gains in local elections in Czechoslovakia. A victory parade in Mährisch Schönberg was broken up by police.
- Born: Tom Oliver, actor, in Chandler's Ford, Hampshire, England

== June 13, 1938 (Monday) ==
- The Nationalists captured Castellón de la Plana.

== June 14, 1938 (Tuesday) ==
- The Caldecott Medal honoring the year's best children's picture books was awarded for the first time, to Dorothy P. Lathrop for Animals of the Bible.
- Born: Shelby Stephenson, poet, in Benson, North Carolina

== June 15, 1938 (Wednesday) ==
- Johnny Vander Meer pitched his second consecutive no-hitter, 6-0 over the Brooklyn Dodgers at the first night game ever played in Ebbets Field. Vander Meer remains the only pitcher in major league history to ever throw back-to-back no-hitters.
- Born: Billy Williams, baseball player, in Whistler, Alabama
- Died: Ernst Ludwig Kirchner, 58, German Expressionist painter (suicide)

== June 16, 1938 (Thursday) ==
- The Battle of Bielsa pocket ended in Nationalist victory.
- Hundreds of civilians directed by brownshirts attacked Jews along the Grenadierstrasse and Dragonerstrasse in Berlin, assaulting them and writing anti-Jewish slogans on store windows.
- Vlas Chubar was arrested.

== June 17, 1938 (Friday) ==
- A general election was held in Ireland. Fianna Fáil retained power, winning 77 of 138 seats,

== June 18, 1938 (Saturday) ==
- John Aspinwall Roosevelt, the youngest child of the President, married Anne Lindsay Clark in Nahant, Massachusetts.
- Babe Ruth accepted a job as a first base coach with the Brooklyn Dodgers. Ruth took the offer hoping it would lead to a manager position, but this would not happen.

== June 19, 1938 (Sunday) ==
- Italy defeated Hungary 4-2 in the FIFA World Cup Final in Paris.
- Custer Creek train wreck: A railway bridge collapse near Saugus, Montana killed at least 47 people.
- Born: Wahoo McDaniel, AFL linebacker and professional wrestler, in Bernice, Louisiana (d. 2002)

== June 20, 1938 (Monday) ==
- A federal grand jury in New York indicted 18 people, most of them Germans, for conspiring to steal military secrets from the United States.
- 19-year-old Gilbert Shepard, a seasonal employee at Many Glacier Hotel, fell to his death from Mount Grinnell in Glacier National Park, Montana. Shepard's body was discovered several days later.
- Died: Liselotte Herrmann, 28, German Communist Resistance fighter (executed)

== June 21, 1938 (Tuesday) ==
- The border between France and Spain was closed again.
- Born: Don Black, lyricist, in London, England

== June 22, 1938 (Wednesday) ==
- Camille Chautemps became Prime Minister of France for the third time.
- Joe Louis knocked out Max Schmeling in the first round of their rematch at Yankee Stadium to retain the world heavyweight boxing title.
- The Bankruptcy Act went into effect in the United States.
- Born: Dennis Fidler, footballer, in Stockport, England (d. 2015)
- Died: C. J. Dennis, 61, Australian poet

== June 23, 1938 (Thursday) ==
- Hermann Göring decreed that effective July 1, all German men and women of any profession or trade could be conscripted to take up work for the state.
- Died: Cecilia Bowes-Lyon, Countess of Strathmore and Kinghorne, 75

== June 24, 1938 (Friday) ==
- U.S. President Franklin D. Roosevelt gave a fireside chat on the accomplishments of the 75th Congress.
- The Royal Air Force launched a new recruitment campaign and received 1,000 inquiries on the first day alone.
- Born: Abulfaz Elchibey, 2nd President of Azerbaijan, in the Nakhichevan ASSR (d. 2000)

== June 25, 1938 (Saturday) ==
- Douglas Hyde became the 1st President of Ireland.
- The Spanish government threatened to bomb "Italian-dominated" towns in the Balearic Islands in retaliation for Italian bombing raids on civilians in the Civil War. Italy responded with threats to wipe Spanish Republican cities off the map.
- President Roosevelt signed the Fair Labor Standards Act and the Federal Food, Drug, and Cosmetic Act into law.

== June 26, 1938 (Sunday) ==
- The Spanish government set three conditions for giving up its reprisal bombing plan: France would reopen its border with Spain, the Spanish rebels stop the bombing of government-held cities, and France and Britain agree to eventually mediate in the conflict.
- Died: James Weldon Johnson, 67, American writer, diplomat and civil rights leader; E. V. Lucas, 70, English writer; Andrew James Peters, 66, American politician

== June 27, 1938 (Monday) ==
- Two more British cargo ships in Spanish ports were attacked by warplanes. The Arlon was bombed at Valencia and the Farnham was hit at Alicante. Prime Minister Neville Chamberlain resisted calls in the House of Commons to equip British merchant ships with anti-aircraft guns, saying "A good many difficulties arise in connection with it."

== June 28, 1938 (Tuesday) ==
- The International Hockey League and Canadian–American Hockey League merged to form the International-American Hockey League, renamed the American Hockey League in 1940.
- Born:
  - John Byner, actor and comedian, in New York City
  - Leon Panetta, American politician and intelligence officer, (U.S. Representative from California, Director of the CIA, Secretary of Defense), in Monterey, California

== June 29, 1938 (Wednesday) ==
- 40,000 Austrian Jews and spouses of Jews were dismissed from their jobs in the private sector.
- A twin-engine Soviet aircraft flew non-stop from Moscow to Vladivostok in 24.5 hours.
- Olympic National Park in the U.S. state of Washington was designated a national park by President Roosevelt.
- Died: Frederick William Vanderbilt, 82, American railway magnate

== June 30, 1938 (Thursday) ==
- The Baker Bowl in Philadelphia, home of the Phillies, hosted its final major league baseball game. The New York Giants defeated the Phillies 4-1. Ownership decided to move the team to Shibe Park and pay rent to the Athletics because Baker Bowl had become much too small and obsolete to be worth renovating.
- The Federal Firearms Act went into effect in the United States.
- The House of Commons agreed to refer the Sandys Affair to a special committee that would determine the applicability of the Official Secrets Act to Members of Parliament. The committee's findings would eventually lead to the revised Official Secrets Act 1939.
