= United States v. Carolene Products Co. =

1938 U.S. Supreme Court case on regulating interstate commerce

Filled Milk Act
- Long title: An Act To prohibit the shipment of filled milk in interstate or foreign commerce
- Acronyms (colloquial): FMA
- Nicknames: The Voigt Act
- Enacted by: the 67th United States Congress
- Effective: March 4, 1923

Citations
- Public law: Public Law 67-513
- Statutes at Large: 42 Stat. 1486

Codification
- U.S.C. sections created: 21 U.S.C. §§ 61–64

Legislative history
- Introduced in the House of Representatives as H.R. 8086 by Edward Voigt (R‑WI) on August 4, 1921; Committee consideration by House Committee on Agriculture; Passed the House of Representatives on May 25, 1922 (250–40); Passed the Senate on March 1, 1923 (Voice vote) with amendment; House of Representatives agreed to Senate amendment on March 3, 1923 (Voice vote); Signed into law by President Warren G. Harding on March 4, 1923

Major amendments
- Act of August 27, 1935 (49 Stat. 885)

United States Supreme Court cases
- United States v. Carolene Products Co. (1938)

United States v. Carolene Products Co.
- Supreme Court of the United States

Argued April 6, 1938 Decided April 25, 1938
- Full case name: United States v. Carolene Products Company
- Citations: 304 U.S. 144 (more) 58 S. Ct. 778; 82 L. Ed. 1234; 1938 U.S. LEXIS 1022

Case history
- Prior: Demurrer to indictment sustained, 7 F. Supp. 500 (S.D. Ill. 1934)

Holding
- The Filled Milk Act did not exceed the power of Congress to regulate interstate commerce, or violate due process under the Fifth Amendment.

Court membership
- Chief Justice Charles E. Hughes Associate Justices James C. McReynolds · Louis Brandeis; Pierce Butler · Harlan F. Stone; Owen Roberts · Benjamin N. Cardozo; Hugo Black · Stanley F. Reed

Case opinions
- Majority: Stone, joined by Hughes, Brandeis, Roberts; Black (except the part designated "Third")
- Concurrence: Butler
- Dissent: McReynolds
- Reed and Cardozo took no part in the consideration or decision of the case.

Laws applied
- U.S. Const. art. I; U.S. Const. amend. V; 21 U.S.C. § 61-63 (1938) (Filled Milk Act § 61-63)

United States v. Carolene Products Company, 304 U.S. 144 (1938), was a case of the United States Supreme Court that upheld the federal government's power to prohibit filled milk from being shipped in interstate commerce. In his majority opinion for the Court, Associate Justice Harlan F. Stone wrote that economic regulations were "presumptively constitutional" under a deferential standard of review known as the "rational basis test".

The case is most notable for Footnote Four, in which Stone wrote that the Court would exercise a stricter standard of review when a law appears on its face to violate a provision of the United States Constitution, restricts the political process in a way that could impede the repeal of an undesirable law, or discriminates against "discrete and insular" minorities. Footnote Four would influence later Supreme Court decisions, and the higher standard of review is now known as "strict scrutiny".

== Background ==
The case dealt with a federal law that prohibited filled milk (skimmed milk compounded with any fat or oil other than milk fat to resemble milk or cream) from being shipped in interstate commerce. The defendant, a company that traded in a form of filled milk consisting of condensed skim milk and coconut oil (which the company labeled "Milnot" or "Milnut"), argued that the law was unconstitutional because of both the Commerce Clause and the Due Process Clause.

In its previous term, the Court had dramatically increased the number of activities considered to be in or to affect interstate commerce. It had also altered its settled jurisprudence in the area of substantive due process, the doctrine dealing with rights not specifically enumerated in the Constitution. The changes meant that many New Deal programs that the Court would previously have struck down as unconstitutional would now be found constitutional.

The defendant company, charged with breaking the law, at trial filed a motion to dismiss on the grounds that the law was unconstitutional. The United States District Court for the Southern District of Illinois granted the defendant's motion, and the Seventh Circuit Court of Appeals affirmed the District Court's ruling.

== Decision ==
Justice Harlan Stone, writing for the Court, held that the law was "presumptively constitutional" properly within legislative discretion. It was not for the courts to overrule because it was supported by substantial public-health evidence and was not arbitrary or irrational. In other words, the Court applied a "rational basis" test.

== Footnote Four ==
Carolene Products is best known for its Footnote Four, which is considered to be "the most famous footnote in constitutional law." Although the Court had applied minimal scrutiny (rational basis review) to the economic regulation in this case, Footnote Four reserved for other types of cases other, stricter standards of review.

Stone said that legislation aimed at "discrete and insular minorities" without the normal protections of the political process would be one exception to the presumption of constitutionality and justify a heightened standard of judicial review. The idea has greatly influenced jurisprudence on the Equal Protection Clause jurisprudence and judicial review. It recapitulated common law jurisprudence by which evidence of fraud or other significant legal defects in the transaction, such as self-dealing or other impropriety, may justify overturning a rule.

Louis Lusky, Stone's law clerk during the 1937 term, helped draft Footnote Four. The constitutional law scholar John Hart Ely based his major work, Democracy and Distrust, on Footnote Four's second and third paragraphs, which correspond to the "Democracy" and "Distrust" of his title.

=== Significance ===
In keeping with the New Deal Revolution, Carolene Products applies the "rational basis test" to economic legislation. An extremely low standard of judicial review, it presumes that the legislation in question is constitutional, thus requiring the challenging party to show that the law fails the test. Most legislation enacted by Congress or state legislatures that deals with economic regulation falls under rational basis review and, therefore, must only be rationally related to a legitimate state interest. However, Carolene Products is most famous for Footnote Four.

Footnote Four describes certain legislative acts that might give rise to a higher level of scrutiny. If a law:

1. appears on its face to violate a provision of the US Constitution, especially in the Bill of Rights,
2. restricts the political process that could repeal an undesirable law, such as restricting voting rights, organizing, disseminating information etc., or
3. discriminates against "discrete and insular" minorities, especially racial, religious, and national minorities and particularly those who lack sufficient numbers or power to seek redress through the political process.

This higher level of scrutiny, now called "strict scrutiny", was applied to strike down an inmate forced sterilization law in Skinner v. Oklahoma (1942) and in Justice Black's infamous opinion in Korematsu v. U.S. (1944) in which Japanese internment was upheld despite being subject to heightened scrutiny. Under strict scrutiny, a law will be struck down unless it serves a compelling governmental interest and is necessary to achieve that end, which means that less restrictive alternatives to the law must be considered by the government even if there is a compelling interest. Therefore, the law must be narrowly tailored to serve the governmental interest and employ the least restrictive alternative.

Intermediate scrutiny, which is often applied in gender discrimination cases, did not arise until decades later. When applied, the law must serve an important governmental interest and be substantially related to that end.

Some argue that the "most famous footnote" was in fact written by not Stone but his law clerk, Louis Lusky. In fact, the cited work above, while quite useful on the origin and growth of the footnote, does not claim that the law clerk was the author, and it implies the opposite, based on letters between the justices. In his later work, Our Nine Tribunes: The Supreme Court in Modern America, however, Lusky includes facsimiles of the original drafts of the footnote, the first of which is in his own hand. Stone edited the second, typed draft, and at the behest of the Chief Justice, he added certain passages.

== See also ==
- List of United States Supreme Court cases, volume 304
- Nebbia v. New York (1934)
- Obiter dictum
