= Louis Lusky =

American legal scholar

- Born: May 15, 1915
- Died: January 4, 2001 (aged 85)
- Title: Professor

Academic background
- Education: Louisville Male High School
- Alma mater: University of Louisville; Columbia University

Academic work
- Discipline: Law
- Sub-discipline: Civil Rights
- Institutions: Columbia Law School

Louis Lusky (May 15, 1915 – January 4, 2001) was an American legal scholar. Considered a pioneer in the field of civil rights law, he was the Betts Professor of Law at Columbia Law School, where he taught from 1963 to 1986.

A native of Louisville, Kentucky, Lusky graduated from Louisville Male High School in 1931. He later attended the University of Louisville and Columbia Law School and graduated as the highest-ranking member of the Columbia Law School Class of 1937. Lusky began his legal career as the clerk for United States Supreme Court Justice Harlan Fiske Stone. During that time he helped draft the famous "Footnote 4" of United States v. Carolene Products Co. (1938). The footnote asserts that the Supreme Court might adopt a higher level of judicial scrutiny in matters concerning noneconomic regulation, which has been applied in cases involving the protection of the integrity of the political process, particularly those involving religious, national, or racial minorities where prejudice might be operative.

During World War II Lusky served as an operations analyst for the Eighth Air Force in England and then returned to his hometown. He was in private practice there and in New York City for 16 years before joining the Columbia Law School faculty in 1963. He authored many articles on constitutional law, and the book By What Right?: A Commentary on the Supreme Court's Power to Revise the Constitution.

== See also ==
- List of law clerks for the ninth seat of the Supreme Court of the United States
