= Presumption of constitutionality =

Legal principle favouring constitutionality of a law

The presumption of constitutionality is a legal principle in the constitutional law of some jurisdictions that the judiciary should presume statutes enacted by the legislature to be constitutional, unless the law is clearly unconstitutional or a fundamental right is implicated.

The scope and effect of the presumption will depend on the particular approach taken in each jurisdiction.

== Canada ==
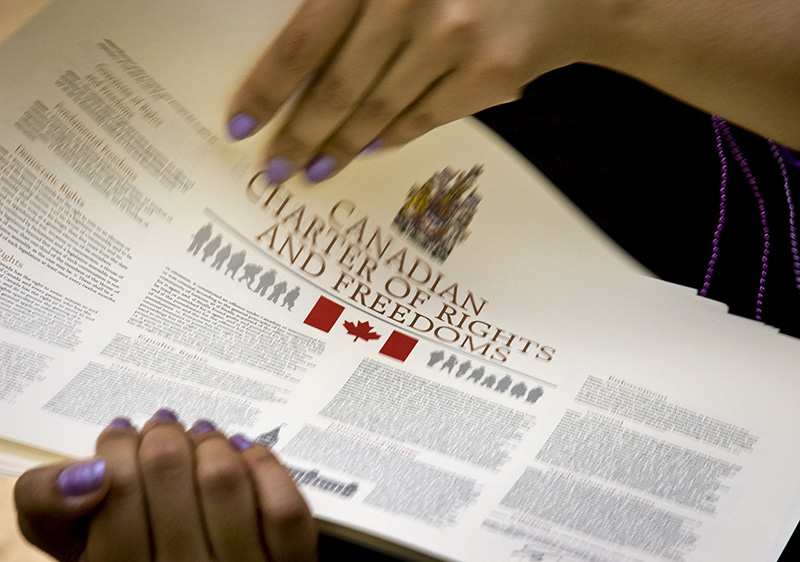
The presumption of constitutionality does not apply to cases under the Canadian Charter of Rights and Freedoms

The Supreme Court of Canada has recognised a presumption of constitutionality, but only in the context of cases dealing with the division of powers between the federal Parliament and the provincial legislatures. The presumption does not apply in cases involving the Canadian Charter of Rights and Freedoms.

In one division of powers case, Justice Ritchie of the Supreme Court stated for the majority:

In all such cases the Court cannot ignore the rule implicit in the proposition stated as early as 1878 by Mr. Justice Strong in Severn v. The Queen, that any question as to the validity of provincial legislation is to be approached on the assumption that it was validly enacted.

The onus is thus on the party challenging the validity of a statute under the division of powers to demonstrate that it is unconstitutional. As well, where there are different reasonable interpretations for a statute, the court should choose the interpretation which keeps the statute within the constitutional authority of the legislative body. That principle normally favours a narrower interpretation over a broader interpretation.

The presumption of constitutionality in division of powers cases is an example of judicial restraint, with the courts staying away from the policy decisions by the elected legislatures as much as possible. The presumption favours the action of the government which has enacted the legislation, possibly in the context of a federal-provincial dispute.

There is no presumption of constitutionality in cases involving the Canadian Charter of Rights and Freedoms. The Supreme Court established this point in an early Charter case, Manitoba (A.G.) v. Metropolitan Stores Ltd., decided in 1987. Speaking for the unanimous panel, Justice Beetz rejected the argument that a presumption of constitutionality applied in Charter cases. He held that such a presumption was not consistent with the basic principle of the Charter:

A reason of principle related to the character of the Charter also persuades me to dismiss the appellant's submission based on the presumption of constitutional validity. Even when one has reached the merits, there is no room for the presumption of constitutional validity within the literal meaning suggested above: the innovative and evolutive character of the Canadian Charter of Rights and Freedoms conflicts with the idea that a legislative provision can be presumed to be consistent with the Charter.

The Charter context is different from the division of powers. When the dispute is between two different orders of government, judicial restraint suggests the courts should stay away from the political dispute as much as possible, with the presumption favouring the validity of the legislation. That approach does not apply in a Charter case, where an individual asserts that a statute has affected their rights under the Charter. A presumption which favoured the government would go contrary to the basic purpose of the Charter, which is to give individuals rights which governments must respect.

Instead, the ordinary onus of proof in civil litigation applies in Charter cases. A plaintiff who alleges a Charter infringement must lead evidence which establishes the potential Charter breach. If the plaintiff meets that onus, the onus then shifts to the government to justify the infringement under section 1 of the Charter.

== United States ==
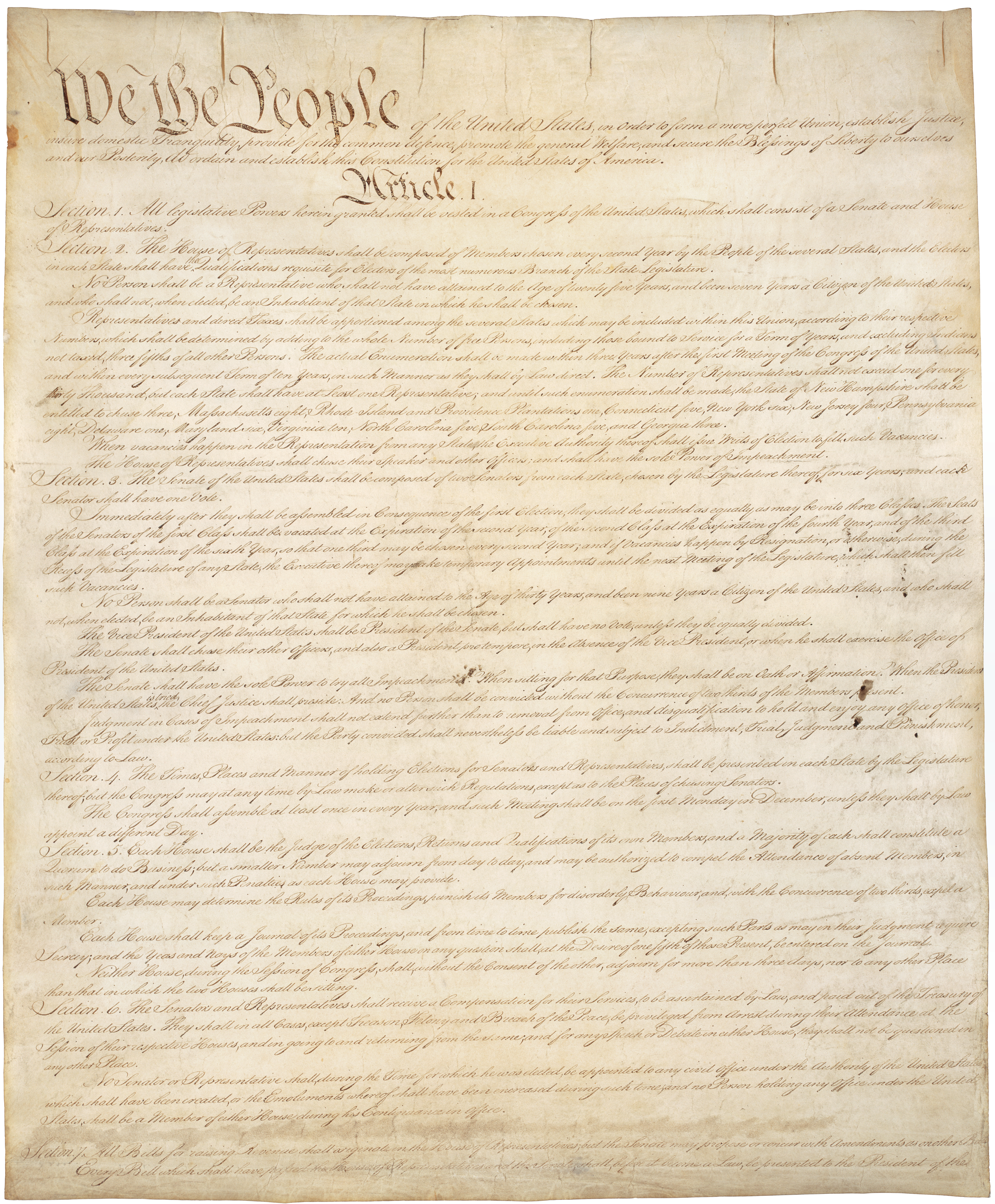
Constitution of the United States

In its strongest form—advocated most notably by James Bradley Thayer—the presumption of constitutionality gives Congress, rather than the courts, the primary responsibility for interpreting the Constitution. This view is in tension with the view of judicial review articulated in Marbury v. Madison, however. Thus, a less strong form of the presumption, repeatedly articulated by the Supreme Court of the United States, has become the dominant approach in American law: "[r]espect for a coordinate branch of Government forbids striking down an Act of Congress except upon a clear showing of unconstitutionality." Constitutional law scholars Gillian E. Metzger and Trevor Morrison summarize this principle as follows: "although the Court's determination of constitutional invalidity always trumps the contrary judgment of a coordinate branch, the Court should not lightly arrive at such a determination."

The presumption of constitutionality is linked to the doctrine of constitutional avoidance (the doctrine that courts will not make rulings on constitutional issues if the case can be resolved on a non-constitutional basis) and the rule that courts will not interpret an ambiguous statute to be unconstitutional in the absence of clear unconstitutionality. The presumption of constitutionality is the canonical principle of the doctrine of constitutional avoidance.

The Supreme Court has held that statutes implicating certain fundamental individual rights are not subject to the general presumption, and are evaluated instead through heightened levels of scrutiny. By contrast, economic legislation is subject to the presumption of constitutionality.

In Federalist 78, Alexander Hamilton wrote that courts should be able strike down a statute as unconstitutional only if there is an "irreconcilable variance" between the statute and the constitution. Otherwise, a statute should be upheld. Likewise, at the 1787 Philadelphia Convention, Virginia delegate George Mason said that judges "could declare an unconstitutional law void. But with regard to every law, however unjust, oppressive or pernicious, which did not come plainly under this description, they would be under the necessity as Judges to give it a free course."

Professor Randy Barnett from Georgetown Law argues that such a presumption is itself unconstitutional and suggests that government should be forced to prove that laws that violate liberty are necessary, replacing the presumption of constitutionality with what he calls the "presumption of liberty."

== Other countries ==
The presumption of constitutionality is part of the constitutional law of a number of other countries, including Ireland and Singapore.

== See also ==
- Presumption of regularity
- Burden of persuasion
- List of legal doctrines
- Rational basis review
