= Rufus Franklin =

American criminal

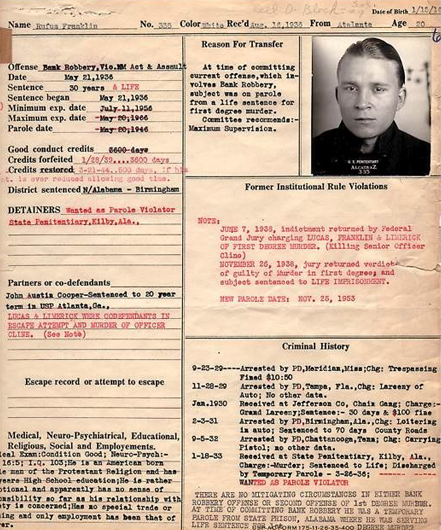
- Rufus Franklin's Inmate Form
- Born: Rufus William Franklin; January 15, 1916; Alabama, U.S.
- Died: May 26, 1975 (aged 59); Dayton, Ohio, U.S.
- Other name: Whitey
- Criminal charges: Bank robbery (before 1935); Murder (1938); Grand Theft Auto; Assault
- Penalty: Life imprisonment

Rufus William Franklin (January 15, 1916 – May 26, 1975) was an American criminal who served a life sentence in Alcatraz Federal Penitentiary. He is best known for taking part in the third documented attempted escape from Alcatraz Prison with Thomas R. Limerick and James C. Lucas on the night of May 23, 1938.

== Biography ==
Franklin was born on January 15, 1916 in Alabama, in Calhoun. Franklin was originally sentenced to imprisonment for bank robbery, car theft, and assault. He was then transferred to Alcatraz, where he became inmate number 335-AZ.

== Alcatraz escape attempt ==
In the spring of 1938, Franklin, Thomas R. Limerick and James C. Lucas planned an escape from Alcatraz Federal Penitentiary. Their escape plan began by incapacitating an unarmed guard supervising a work detail on the top floor. Once the supervisor was rendered unconscious, the convicts would escape through a window to the rooftop, where they would incapacitate an armed guard and leave the island via a seized police boat. They enacted their escape plan on May 23, 1938, in the prison's mat shop, where they assaulted Custodial Officer Royal Cline with hammer blows to his head. They proceeded to the roof, where armed guard Harold Stites (who was later killed in the 1946 Battle of Alcatraz) shot both Franklin and Limerick, although Lucas wasn't shot. Other guards arrived at the scene. Franklin, Limerick, and Lucas were cornered and surrendered to the guards.

Cline died of his injuries the next day, as did Limerick. Franklin and Lucas, the other surviving convict, were tried for murder and sentenced to life imprisonment, after the jury spared them from execution. Franklin spent many years of solitary confinement in Alcatraz's D Block. He was eventually transferred to the Atlanta federal prison where he was paroled in 1974. Franklin died a year later, on May 26, 1975.

== See also ==
- List of Alcatraz escape attempts
