= Rational basis review =

Normal standard of review in U.S. constitutional law

In U.S. constitutional law, rational basis review is the normal standard of review that courts apply when considering constitutional questions, including due process or equal protection questions under the Fifth Amendment or Fourteenth Amendment. Courts applying rational basis review seek to determine whether a law is "rationally related" to a "legitimate" government interest, whether real or hypothetical. The higher levels of scrutiny are intermediate scrutiny and strict scrutiny. Heightened scrutiny is applied where a suspect or quasi-suspect classification is involved, or a fundamental right is implicated. In U.S. Supreme Court jurisprudence, the nature of the interest at issue determines the level of scrutiny applied by appellate courts. When courts engage in rational basis review, only the most egregious enactments, those not rationally related to a legitimate government interest, are overturned.

Rational basis review tests whether the government's actions are "rationally related" to a "legitimate" government interest. The Supreme Court has never set forth standards for determining what constitutes a legitimate government interest. Under rational basis review, it is "entirely irrelevant" what end the government is actually seeking and statutes can be based on "rational speculation unsupported by evidence or empirical data". Rather, if the court can merely hypothesize a "legitimate" interest served by the challenged action, it will withstand rational basis review. Judges following the Supreme Court's instructions understand themselves to be "obligated to seek out other conceivable reasons for validating" challenged laws if the government is unable to justify its own policies.

== History ==
The concept of rational basis review can be traced to an influential 1893 article, "The Origin and Scope of American Constitutional Law", by Harvard law professor James Bradley Thayer. Thayer argued that statutes should be invalidated only if their unconstitutionality is "so clear that it is not open to rational question". Justice Oliver Wendell Holmes Jr., a student of Thayer's, articulated a version of what would become rational basis review in his canonical dissent in Lochner v. New York, arguing that

the word 'liberty', in the 14th Amendment, is perverted when it is held to prevent the natural outcome of a dominant opinion, unless it can be said that a rational and fair man necessarily would admit that the statute proposed would infringe fundamental principles as they have been understood by the traditions of our people and our law.

However, the court's extensive application of economic substantive due process during the years following Lochner meant that Holmes' proposed doctrine of judicial deference to state interest was not immediately adopted. It was not until Nebbia v. New York that the Court began to formally apply rational basis review, when it stated that "a State is free to adopt whatever economic policy may reasonably be deemed to promote public welfare, and to enforce that policy by legislation adapted to its purpose". In United States v. Carolene Products Co. the Court in Footnote Four left open the possibility that laws that seem to be within "a specific prohibition of the Constitution", which restrict the political process, or which burden "discrete and insular minorities" might receive more exacting review. Today, such laws receive strict scrutiny, whereas laws implicating unenumerated rights that the Supreme Court has not recognized as fundamental receive rational basis review.

Under rational basis review, laws are presumed to be constitutional in deference to legislators.

== Applicability ==
In modern constitutional law, the rational basis test is applied to constitutional challenges of both federal law and state law (via the Fourteenth Amendment). This test also applies to both legislative and executive action, whether those actions be of a substantive or procedural nature.

The rational basis test prohibits the government from imposing restrictions on liberty that are irrational or arbitrary, or drawing distinctions between persons in a manner that serves no constitutionally legitimate end. While a law "enacted for broad and ambitious purposes often can be explained by reference to legitimate public policies which justify the incidental disadvantages they impose on certain persons", it must nevertheless, at least, bear "a rational relationship to a legitimate governmental purpose".

To understand the concept of rational basis review, it is useful to understand what it is not. Rational basis review is not a genuine effort to determine the legislature's actual reasons for enacting a statute, nor to inquire into whether a statute does in fact further a legitimate end of government. A court applying rational basis review will virtually always uphold a challenged law unless every conceivable justification for it is a grossly illogical non sequitur. In 2008, Justice John Paul Stevens reaffirmed the lenient nature of rational basis review in a concurring opinion: "[A]s I recall my esteemed former colleague, Thurgood Marshall, remarking on numerous occasions: 'The Constitution does not prohibit legislatures from enacting stupid laws.'"

== See also ==
- Chevron deference
- Wednesbury reasonableness
- Due process
- Equal Protection Clause
- John Marshall
- Marbury v. Madison
- Plyler v. Doe
- Romer v. Evans
