= Johnson v. Zerbst =

- Supreme Court of the United States

Argued April 4, 1938 Decided May 23, 1938
- Full case name: Johnson v. Zerbst, Warden, United States Penitentiary, Atlanta, Ga.
- Citations: 304 U.S. 458 (more) 58 S. Ct. 1019; 82 L. Ed. 1461; 1938 U.S. LEXIS 896

Case history
- Prior: 92 F.2d 748 (5th Cir. 1937)

Holding
- Since the Sixth Amendment constitutionally entitles one charged with crime to the assistance of counsel, compliance with this constitutional mandate is an essential jurisdictional prerequisite to a federal court's authority to deprive an accused of his life or liberty.

Court membership
- Chief Justice Charles E. Hughes Associate Justices James C. McReynolds · Louis Brandeis; Pierce Butler · Harlan F. Stone; Owen Roberts · Benjamin N. Cardozo; Hugo Black · Stanley F. Reed

Case opinions
- Majority: Black, joined by Hughes, Brandeis, Stone, Roberts
- Concurrence: Reed
- Dissent: McReynolds
- Dissent: Butler
- Cardozo took no part in the consideration or decision of the case.

Johnson v. Zerbst, 304 U.S. 458 (1938), was a United States Supreme Court case, in which the petitioner, Johnson, had been convicted in federal court of feloniously possessing, uttering, and passing counterfeit money in a trial where he had not been represented by an attorney but instead by himself. Johnson filed for habeas corpus relief, claiming that his Sixth Amendment right to counsel had been violated, but he was denied by both a federal district court and the court of appeals.

== Supreme Court involvement ==
The United States Supreme Court agreed to hear the case and overturned the decisions of the lower courts. In a six to two decision, the Court held that the federal court had infringed upon Johnson's life and liberty by not giving him counsel to defend him during trial. In the majority opinion written by Justice Hugo Black, the Court held that,

Since the Sixth Amendment constitutionally entitles one charged with crime to the assistance of counsel, compliance with this constitutional mandate is an essential jurisdictional prerequisite to a federal court's authority to deprive an accused of his life or liberty. When this right is properly waived, the assistance of counsel is no longer a necessary element of the court's jurisdiction to proceed to conviction and sentence. If the accused, however, is not represented by counsel and has not competently and intelligently waived his constitutional right, the Sixth Amendment stands as a jurisdictional bar to a valid conviction and sentence depriving him of his life or his liberty.

This set the precedent that defendants have the right to be represented by an attorney unless they waive their right to counsel knowing full well the potential consequences. This precedent, however, only made this right applicable to federal defendants and did not extend to defendants in trials under state jurisdiction. Assistance of counsel was held to be requisite to due process of law in state felony proceedings with the Gideon v. Wainwright decision in 1963.

== See also ==
- List of United States Supreme Court cases, volume 304
