= Hinderlider v. La Plata River & Cherry Creek Ditch Co. =

- Supreme Court of the United States

Argued January 31, 1938 Decided April 25, 1938
- Full case name: Hinderlider v. La Plata River & Cherry Creek Ditch Co.
- Citations: 304 U.S. 92 (more) 58 S. Ct. 803; 82 L. Ed. 1202

Case history
- Prior: 101 Colo. 73, 70 P.2d 849 (1937)

Holding
- Federal common law applies to resolve water rights governed by an interstate compact.

Court membership
- Chief Justice Charles E. Hughes Associate Justices James C. McReynolds · Louis Brandeis; Pierce Butler · Harlan F. Stone; Owen Roberts · Benjamin N. Cardozo; Hugo Black · Stanley F. Reed

Case opinion
- Majority: Brandeis, joined by Hughes, McReynolds, Butler, Stone, Roberts, Black, Reed
- Cardozo took no part in the consideration or decision of the case.

Hinderlider v. La Plata River & Cherry Creek Ditch Co., 304 U.S. 92 (1938), is a US Supreme Court case that said a "general common law" or "general federal common law" no longer exists in the American legal system and is unconstitutional. However, federal courts retain the power to create federal common law in specific areas related to federal rights and interests.

== Facts ==
The La Plata River and Cherry Creek Ditch Company, a Colorado corporation, owned a ditch used to divert water from the La Plata River for irrigation. The La Plata River flows from Colorado into New Mexico, and its water is used beneficially in both states. In 1928, the State Engineers of Colorado and New Mexico agreed to rotate the river's water flow between the two states during a period of low water, pursuant to the La Plata River Compact. The Compact, ratified by both states and approved by Congress, apportioned the river's water between Colorado and New Mexico under varying conditions. The Ditch Company claimed that its rights to divert water, adjudicated in an 1898 Colorado decree, were violated by the Compact's implementation, as it deprived the company of water during the rotation period. La Plata River Co. sought a mandatory injunction against Michael Creed Hinderlider, State Engineer for the State of Colorado, and his subordinates from taking the water.

== Judgment ==
The Court emphasized that the La Plata River is an interstate stream, and its water must be equitably apportioned between Colorado and New Mexico. The 1898 Colorado decree could not grant the Ditch Company rights exceeding Colorado's equitable share of the river's water. The Compact, as a legislative agreement between the states with Congressional approval, was a valid mechanism for apportioning the river's water and binding on all water claimants, including those with pre-existing rights. The Court rejected the argument that the Compact violated the Ditch Company's vested rights, noting that the Compact's provisions, including the rotation of water flow, were designed to maximize the beneficial use of the river's water. The Court found no evidence of procedural infirmities or inequities in the negotiation, ratification, or implementation of the Compact.

The United States Supreme Court reversed the judgment of the Supreme Court of Colorado. The Court held that the La Plata River Compact was valid and binding, and the actions of the State Engineer in administering the Compact were lawful. The Ditch Company's rights under the 1898 decree were limited to Colorado's equitable share of the river's water, as determined by the Compact.

== Significance ==
An archetypical example of such federal common law is that relating to disputes between states of the United States. Hinderlider was the first case to reaffirm the existence of federal common law for other purposes, specifically here, the interpretation of an interstate compact governing water rights between states.

== See also ==
- List of United States Supreme Court cases, volume 304
