= Filled milk =

Milk reconstituted with non-dairy fats

Filled milk is any milk, cream, or skim milk that has been reconstituted with fats, usually vegetable oils, from sources other than dairy cows. Pure evaporated filled milk is generally considered unsuitable for drinking because of its particular flavor, but is equivalent to unadulterated evaporated milk for baking and cooking purposes. Other filled milk products with substituted fat are used to make ice cream, sour cream, whipping cream, and half-and-half substitutes among other dairy products. Coconut oil filled milk became a popular cost-saving product sold throughout the United States in the early 20th century. Coconut oil could be cheaply imported, primarily from the Philippines (at the time under American rule), and this product was able to undercut the market for evaporated and condensed milk. At the time, liquid milk was not widely available or very popular in cities because of the rarity of refrigeration and the problems of transportation and storage.

== History and importance in American law ==
In 1923, the United States Congress banned the interstate sale of filled milk "in imitation or semblance of milk, cream, or skimmed milk" via the "Filled Milk Act" of March 4, 1923 (c. 262, 42 Stat. 1486, 21 U.S.C. §§ 61–63), in response to intense lobbying by the dairy industry, attempting to protect its market against competition by cheaper foreign fat. Many states also passed bans or restrictions on the sale and production of filled milk products. The issue of filled milk came to the forefront in United States v. Carolene Products Co. from 1938, wherein Carolene Products Co. was indicted in the United States District Court for the Southern District of Illinois for violation of the Act by the shipment in interstate commerce of certain packages of "Milnot", a compound of condensed skimmed milk and coconut oil made in imitation or semblance of condensed milk or cream. The indictment stated, in the words of the statute, that Milnut "is an adulterated article of food, injurious to the public health," and that it is not a prepared food product of the type excepted from the prohibition of the Act.

Subsequently, most states have eliminated restrictions on filled milk and several states have gone against the Supreme Court and struck down restrictions on filled milk. Even the United States District Court for the Southern District of Illinois that originally ruled that a rational basis supported the Filled Milk Act reversed their decision in Milnot Co. v. Richardson, 350 F.Supp. 221 (S.D. Ill. 1972). Further, the United States Department of Agriculture has broadly refused to consider filled milk products to be "in imitation or semblance of milk" and therefore has declined to see them as within the statute. The Milnot Company, which still exists, in this case was a descendant of the original Carolene Products Company. Currently, filled milk continues to be widely available in supermarkets in the United States with the Milnot brand now owned by Eagle Foods, which is owned by private equity firm Kelso & Company
