= Easter Accords =

1938 series of agreements between Britain and Italy

- Signed: April 16, 1938
- Location: Chigi Palace, Rome
- Ratified: November 16, 1938
- Signatories: (British Empire) Eric Drummond; (Kingdom of Italy) Galeazzo Ciano
- Parties: United Kingdom; Italy
- Languages: English; Italian

The Anglo-Italian Agreements of 1938, also called the Easter Pact or the Easter Accords (Italian: Patto or Accordi di Pasqua), were a series of agreements concluded between the British and the Italian governments in Rome on 16 April 1938 to facilitate the Italian government's co-operation in keeping the existing world order and to prevent it from allying with Germany.

The agreements were registered in the League of Nations Treaty Series on 15 March 1939.

== Background ==
Since 1935, the British and French governments had been courting the Italian government under Mussolini in the hope of preventing the formation of an alliance between Italy and Nazi Germany. That concern led to the British and the French responses to the Italian invasion of Ethiopia and the Italian involvement in the Spanish Civil War to be weak and ineffectual.

Additionally, Italy had been broadcasting anti-British propaganda and supplying arms to Arab rebels in British Palestine.

Meanwhile, Italy sought to turn Britain away from France so that Britain would remain neutral when Italy would decide to attack France. That policy would last until the Italians entered the Second World War in June 1940.

== Terms ==
In the several agreements signed on the same day, the British and the Italian governments undertook to observe the order in the Mediterranean and to refrain from any actions against the sovereignty of the Kingdoms of Saudi Arabia and Yemen, where the British government had a foothold in Aden while the Italian government controlled Somalia, across the Straits of Aden. They also undertook to uphold the freedom of navigation in the Suez Canal and to preserve the peace between their colonial possessions in East Africa. Ethiopia was not named in the agreements, but it was clear the British government intended to ignore the issue to the benefit of Italian control there. The Italian government undertook to withdraw its forces from Spain to facilitate the restoration of peace in that country.

== Aftermath ==
The accords were largely a failure for both sides. Italy failed to drive a wedge in relations between France and Britain and the appeasement policy towards the Italian government did not prevent the formation of a German-Italian alliance, which was concluded in May 1939 as the Pact of Steel.
