= Collins v. Yosemite Park & Curry Co. =

- Supreme Court of the United States

Argued April 27–28, 1938 Decided May 31, 1938
- Full case name: Collins v. Yosemite Park & Curry Co.
- Citations: 304 U.S. 518 (more) 58 S. Ct. 1009; 82 L. Ed. 1502; 1938 U.S. LEXIS 1030

Case history
- Prior: 20 F. Supp. 1009 (N.D. Cal. 1937)

Court membership
- Chief Justice Charles E. Hughes Associate Justices James C. McReynolds · Louis Brandeis; Pierce Butler · Harlan F. Stone; Owen Roberts · Benjamin N. Cardozo; Hugo Black · Stanley F. Reed

Case opinions
- Majority: Reed, joined by Hughes, Brandeis, Butler, Stone, Roberts, Black
- Concurrence: McReynolds
- Cardozo took no part in the consideration or decision of the case.

Collins v. Yosemite Park & Curry Co., 304 U.S. 518 (1938), is a court case in which the appellee, the Yosemite Park and Curry Co., brought this suit to enjoin the California State Board of Equalization and the State Attorney General from enforcing the 'Alcoholic Beverage Control Act' of the State of California, within the limits of Yosemite National Park.

== Supreme Court involvement ==
The court distinguished between the State's power under the Twenty-first Amendment to regulate the importation of liquor to the state, and its "territorial jurisdiction" over a federal enclave like the park.

The court held that the sections of a California statute which levied excises on sales of liquor in Yosemite National Park were enforceable in the Park, while sections of the same statute providing regulation of the Park liquor traffic through licenses were unenforceable.

== See also ==
- List of United States Supreme Court cases, volume 304
