= Thomas R. Limerick =

American criminal (1902–1938)

Thomas Robert Limerick
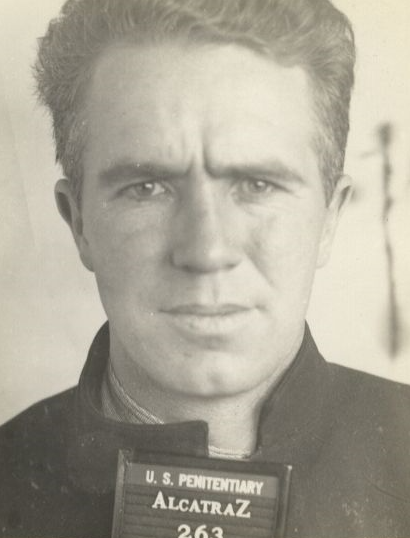
- Born: January 7, 1902; Council Bluffs, Iowa, U.S.
- Died: May 23, 1938 (aged 36); Alcatraz Federal Penitentiary, San Francisco, California, U.S.
- Cause of death: Gunshot wounds
- Status: Deceased
- Convictions: Bank robbery Kidnapping
- Penalty: Life imprisonment

Thomas Robert Limerick (January 7, 1902 – May 23, 1938) was an American criminal, who took part in the third documented escape attempt from Alcatraz Island on the night of May 23, 1938.

== Biography ==
Thomas Limerick was born on January 7, 1902 in Council Bluffs, Iowa. He grew up in a middle-class family until his father died when he was 15. His family was soon thrown into poverty and left Thomas, the oldest of 5 children, to get a job. Originally a boxcar bandit, he joined a gang of bank robbers headed by Maurice Denning based in Gage County, Nebraska in 1934. On August 23, 1934, the gang robbed a National Guard Armory, and between October and November of that year, robbed large banks in Hawarden, Iowa, Dell Rapids, South Dakota and Superior, Nebraska. They kidnapped three people during one of the robberies. Limerick was arrested in a nightclub in St. Joseph, Missouri on May 25, 1935, and eventually sentenced to life imprisonment at Leavenworth Penitentiary, but later transferred to Alcatraz.

== Alcatraz escape attempt ==
In the spring of 1938, Limerick, James Lucas, and Rufus Franklin planned an escape from Alcatraz. Their escape plan began by incapacitating an unarmed guard supervising a work detail on the top floor. Once the supervisor was rendered unconscious, the convicts would escape through a window to the rooftop, where they would incapacitate an armed guard and leave the island via a seized police boat. They enacted their escape plan on May 23, 1938, in the prison's mat shop, where they assaulted Custodial Officer Royal Cline with hammer blows to his head. They proceeded to the roof, where armed guard Harold Stites (who was later killed in the 1946 Battle of Alcatraz) shot both Franklin and Limerick, although Lucas wasn't shot. Other guards arrived at the scene. Franklin, Limerick, and Lucas were cornered and surrendered to the guards.

Cline died of his injuries the next day, as did Limerick. Lucas and the other surviving convict, Rufus Franklin, were tried for murder and sentenced to life imprisonment.

== See also ==
- List of Alcatraz escape attempts
