= July 1938 =

Month of 1938

<<	July 1938					>>
Su	Mo	Tu	We	Th	Fr	Sa
					1	2
3	4	5	6	7	8	9
10	11	12	13	14	15	16
17	18	19	20	21	22	23
24	25	26	27	28	29	30
31

The following events occurred in July 1938:

== July 1, 1938 (Friday) ==
- Jewish schools in Nazi Germany lost tax exemption status.
- The four-day 1938 Gettysburg reunion began, commemorating the 75th anniversary of the Battle of Gettysburg.
- Don Budge of the United States won his second straight Wimbledon title, defeating Harry Austin of the United Kingdom in the Gentlemen's Singles final.
- Born: Hariprasad Chaurasia, classical flautist, in Allahabad, British India

== July 2, 1938 (Saturday) ==
- Helen Wills Moody defeated fellow American Helen Hull Jacobs in the Ladies' Singles final for her eighth and last Wimbledon title.
- Died: John James Burnet, 81, Scottish architect

== July 3, 1938 (Sunday) ==
- France and Turkey signed a pact on the Sanjak of Alexandretta, agreeing to settle the future of the region with an election.
- A referendum in Switzerland approved a new penal code.
- U.S. President Franklin D. Roosevelt dedicated the Eternal Light Peace Memorial on the Gettysburg Battlefield.
- British locomotive Mallard set a new world record speed for steam engines of 126 miles per hour.
- Manfred von Brauchitsch of Germany won the French Grand Prix.

== July 4, 1938 (Monday) ==
- Benito Mussolini opened threshing season in Aprilia with the boast that Italy would never buy grain from "the so-called great democracies."
- The Cuban House and Senate passed a resolution proclaiming President Roosevelt "eminent citizen of the Americas" and "illustrious adoptive son of Cuba".
- Born: Bill Withers, singer-songwriter, in Slab Fork, West Virginia (d. 2020)
- Died: Otto Bauer, 56, Austrian philosopher and politician; Suzanne Lenglen, 39, French tennis player (pernicious anemia)

== July 5, 1938 (Tuesday) ==
- 6 Jews were killed in another day of violence in Palestine.
- Turkey sent troops into the Sanjak of Alexandretta to oversee the referendum.
- According to Japanese government official documents figure report, a torrential rain, resulting in flash flooding and debris flow hit around Mount Rokko area, including Kobe, Nishinomiya, killing at least 715 persons.
- Goiânia Esporte Clube was founded in Brazil.

== July 6, 1938 (Wednesday) ==
- An international conference opened in Évian-les-Bains on the Jewish refugee situation in Europe.
- The National League beat the American League 4-1 in the Major League Baseball All-Star Game at Crosley Field in Cincinnati, Ohio.
- American astronomer Seth Barnes Nicholson discovered Lysithea, the tenth moon of Jupiter to be identified from Earth.
- Born: Tony Lewis, cricketer and commentator, in Swansea, Wales; Luana Patten, actress, in Long Beach, California (d. 1996)

== July 7, 1938 (Thursday) ==
- A bomb thrown into a crowd of Arabs by Zionists in Jerusalem killed a man and wounded two others. The British sent two warships and an additional brigade to the region.
- An exhibition of art banned in Germany as "degenerate" opened in London, with paintings by Max Beckmann, Wassily Kandinsky and others.

== July 8, 1938 (Friday) ==
- Reg Whitcombe won the 73rd Open Championship.
- The historical biographical film Marie Antoinette starring Norma Shearer in the title role premiered in Los Angeles.
- Born: Justin Leiber, philosopher and science fiction writer, in Chicago, Illinois (d. 2016)

== July 9, 1938 (Saturday) ==
- A decree in Nazi Germany banned Jews from working in a number of professions, including private detective, real estate broker and tourist guide.
- Specify, with John Adams in the saddle, won the first-ever Hollywood Derby.
- Born: Brian Dennehy, actor, in Bridgeport, Connecticut (d. 2020)
- Died: Benjamin N. Cardozo, 68, Associate Justice of the United States Supreme Court

== July 10, 1938 (Sunday) ==
- Hitler opened the Great Exhibition of German Art in Munich with a speech attacking the London exhibition of banned German art, calling modern artists "cultural Neanderthalers" and "lamentable unfortunates who plainly suffer from defective sight."
- Associação Olímpica de Itabaiana was founded in Brazil.
- Born: Tura Satana, actress, in Hokkaido, Japan (d. 2011)

== July 11, 1938 (Monday) ==
- Nazi Germany banned Jews from health spas.

== July 12, 1938 (Tuesday) ==
- Venezuela informed the League of Nations of its intent to withdraw from the organization.
- Born: Wieger Mensonides, swimmer, in The Hague, Netherlands

== July 13, 1938 (Wednesday) ==
- The Kröller-Müller Museum opened in the Netherlands.
- Died: Emil Kirdorf, 91, German industrialist

== July 14, 1938 (Thursday) ==
- The Manifesto of Race was published in Italy. Benito Mussolini declared Italians to be Aryans and superior to non-Europeans.
- Howard Hughes completed a round-the-world flight in a Lockheed Model 14 Super Electra in 91 hours, 14 minutes and 10 seconds.
- Born: Tommy Vig, percussionist, composer and bandleader, in Budapest, Hungary

== July 15, 1938 (Friday) ==
- The refugee conference in Évian-les-Bains ended with little accomplished. No country, except for the Dominican Republic, was willing to accept any Jews.
- Howard Hughes received a ticker tape parade in New York City.

== July 16, 1938 (Saturday) ==
- The Nationalists pushed into the Province of Valencia.
- Japan notified the International Olympic Committee that it was forfeiting the 1940 Summer Olympics since it could not prepare for them while fighting the Second Sino-Japanese War. The mayor of Tokyo said the city would apply for the 1944 Games instead.
- Paul Runyan won the PGA Championship at Shawnee Country Club in Smithfield Township, Pennsylvania.
- Seabiscuit won the first-ever Hollywood Gold Cup.
- Died: Samuel Insull, 78, British-born American business magnate

== July 17, 1938 (Sunday) ==
- Douglas Corrigan took off from Floyd Bennett Field in Brooklyn, New York, supposedly heading back to the West Coast after being denied permission to fly across the Atlantic. To the bewilderment of a few onlookers present, his plane turned 180 degrees and vanished in a cloudbank.
- Died: Robert Wiene, 65, German film director

== July 18, 1938 (Monday) ==
- Douglas Corrigan landed in Dublin, Ireland claiming to have gotten lost. Authorities didn't buy his story and suspended his license, but "Wrong Way" Corrigan became a national celebrity back in America.
- On the second anniversary of the outbreak of the Spanish Civil War, Francisco Franco was given the rank of Capitán General del Ejército y de la Armada.
- Born: Ian Stewart, keyboardist and co-founder of the Rolling Stones, in Pittenweem, Scotland (d. 1985); Paul Verhoeven, filmmaker, in Amsterdam, Netherlands
- Died: Marie of Romania, 62, last Queen consort of Romania

== July 19, 1938 (Tuesday) ==
- The IOC awarded the 1940 Summer Olympics to Helsinki.
- George VI and Queen Elizabeth visited Paris and received a tremendous welcome.
- Salvador Dalí met one of his biggest influences, Sigmund Freud, in London. The Spanish Surrealist showed Freud his painting Metamorphosis of Narcissus and sketched his portrait. Freud wrote enthusiastically the next day of how much Dalí had impressed him and caused him to reassess his previous opinion of the Surrealists as "100 percent fools".
- Joan Crawford and Franchot Tone released a joint statement announcing their separation.
- Born: Jayant Narlikar, astrophysicist, in Kolhapur, British India (d. 2025)

== July 20, 1938 (Wednesday) ==
- Mayon Volcano was made a National Park in the Philippines.
- Born: Roger Hunt, footballer, in Glazebury, Cheshire, England (d. 2021); Tony Oliva, baseball player, in Pinar del Río, Cuba; Diana Rigg, actress, in Doncaster, England (d. 2020); Natalie Wood, actress, in San Francisco, California (d. 1981)

== July 21, 1938 (Thursday) ==
- Bolivia and Paraguay signed the final peace treaty ending the Chaco War of 1932–35.
- The Soviet Union rejected a Japanese demand to withdraw immediately from disputed territory near the junction of Manchukuo, Siberia and Korea.

== July 22, 1938 (Friday) ==
- The Popular Democratic Party of Puerto Rico was founded.
- Tientsin incident: Japanese forces stormed the Chinese parts of Tianjin in an amphibious assault.
- Died: Francesco Del Grosso, 38, Italian Olympic cyclist, was killed in action fighting for the Nationalist faction in the Spanish Civil War.

== July 23, 1938 (Saturday) ==
- Jews in Germany were ordered to report to police by December 31, 1938 to receive special identification cards that would be required for all dealings with government officials.
- Born: Juliet Anderson, adult film actress, in Burbank, California (d. 2010); Ronny Cox, actor and musician, in Cloudcroft, New Mexico; Götz George, actor, in Berlin, Germany (d. 2016); Bert Newton, radio and television host, in Fitzroy, Victoria, Australia (d. 2021)

== July 24, 1938 (Sunday) ==
- The Levante Offensive ended in failure for the Nationalists.
- At least 34 people were killed in Bogotá, Colombia when a stunt plane crashed into a crowd watching the inauguration of a new airfield. President Alfonso López Pumarejo and president-elect Eduardo Santos narrowly escaped injury when the plane crashed only a few feet from their grandstand.
- Richard Seaman of the United Kingdom won the German Grand Prix.
- Born: Eugene J. Martin, artist, in Lafayette, Louisiana (d. 2005)

== July 25, 1938 (Monday) ==
- The Battle of the Ebro began when 80,000 Republicans started crossing the Ebro.
- A bomb explosion killed 43 Arabs in a crowded market in Haifa. At least 4 Jews were killed and 8 wounded in the rioting that followed until a curfew was imposed.
- The fourth anniversary of the July Putsch was marked in Vienna as a day of "national pride".
- Italian Fascist leader Achille Starace said that the Manifesto of Race must be followed by "ulterior political action."
- Australia won the fourth test against England, leading to a drawn series and Australia retaining The Ashes.
- Franz Joseph II became Sovereign Prince of Liechtenstein.
- Died: Franz I, Prince of Liechtenstein, 84

== July 26, 1938 (Tuesday) ==
- Chinese troops retreated from Jiujiang.
- Died: Daisy Greville, Countess of Warwick, 76, British socialite

== July 27, 1938 (Wednesday) ==
- The British freighter Dellwyn was sunk by Nationalist warplanes in the port of Gandia.
- Born: Gary Gygax, game designer and co-creator of Dungeons & Dragons, in Chicago (d. 2008)

== July 28, 1938 (Thursday) ==
- Cunard White-Star liner RMS Mauretania was launched.
- Born: Luis Aragonés, footballer and manager, in Hortaleza, Spain (d. 2014); Alberto Fujimori, President of Peru, in Lima (d. 2024)
- Died: Yakov Alksnis, 41, Latvian-born commander of the Red Army Air Forces (executed in the Great Purge); Alexander Andreyevich Svechin, 59, Russian military leader (executed)

== July 29, 1938 (Friday) ==
- The conflict between Japan and the Soviet Union known as the Battle of Lake Khasan began.
- A revolt broke out on the Greek island of Crete. It was soon brutally suppressed by Greek troops.
- About 40 people were killed and over 250 injured in riots between Hindus and Muslims in Yangon.
- The musical drama film Little Miss Broadway starring Shirley Temple, Edna May Oliver and George Murphy was released.
- Born: Peter Jennings, journalist and news anchor, in Toronto, Canada (d. 2005)
- Died: Boris Shumyatsky, 51, Soviet film producer (executed in the Great Purge)

== July 30, 1938 (Saturday) ==
- On his seventy-fifth birthday, Henry Ford accepted the Grand Cross of the Order of the German Eagle with a message of personal congratulations from Hitler.
- Seth Barnes Nicholson discovered Carme, the eleventh moon of Jupiter to be discovered from Earth.

== July 31, 1938 (Sunday) ==
- The Siege of Gandesa began.
- 60 people were killed in a train crash in Jamaica.
- Gino Bartali of Italy won the Tour de France.
