= James Bradley Thayer =

American lawyer (1831–1902)

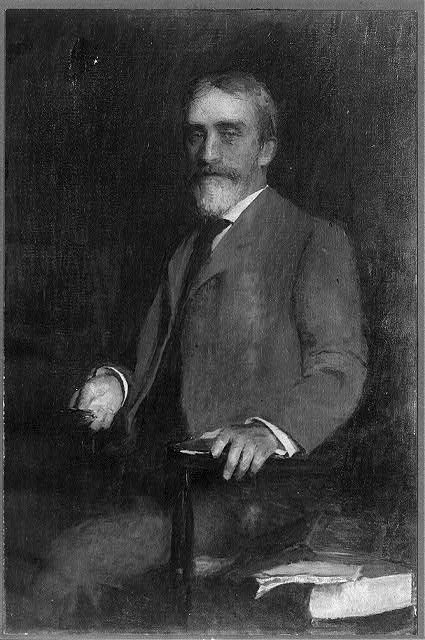
- Born: January 15, 1831; Haverhill, Massachusetts
- Died: February 14, 1902 (aged 71)
- Occupation: Legal scholar

Academic background
- Education: Harvard University

Academic work
- Sub-discipline: historical evolution of law
- Institutions: Harvard Law School
- Notable students: Oliver Wendell Holmes Jr. Learned Hand
- Notable ideas: conceptualize rational basis review

James Bradley Thayer (January 15, 1831 – February 14, 1902) was an American legal theorist and educator known for articulating the concept of rational basis review.

== Life ==
Born at Haverhill, Massachusetts, he graduated from Harvard College in 1852, where he established the overcoat fund for needy undergraduates. In 1856 he graduated from Harvard Law School, was admitted to the bar of Suffolk County and began to practice law in Boston. From 1873 to 1883 he was Royall professor of law at Harvard. In 1883 he was transferred to the professorship which after 1893 was known as the Weld professorship and which he held until his death on February 14, 1902. He took a special interest in the historical evolution of law.

He wrote The Origin and Scope of the American Doctrine of Constitutional Law (1893); Cases on Evidence (1892); Cases on Constitutional Law (1895); The Development of Trial by Jury (1896); A Preliminary Treatise on Evidence at the Common Law (1898), and a short life of John Marshall (1901); and edited the twelfth edition of Kent's Commentaries and the Letters of Chauncey Wright (1877), and A Westward Journey with Mr. Emerson (1884).

== Rational basis review ==
The concept of rational basis review can be traced to his influential 1893 article, "The Origin and Scope of American Constitutional Law." Thayer argued that statutes should be invalidated only if their unconstitutionality is "so clear that it is not open to rational question."

Justice Oliver Wendell Holmes Jr., a student of Thayer, articulated a version of what would become rational basis review in his canonical dissent in Lochner v. New York and argued that "the word 'liberty' in the Fourteenth Amendment is perverted when it is held to prevent the natural outcome of a dominant opinion, unless it can be said that a rational and fair man necessarily would admit that the statute proposed would infringe fundamental principles as they have been understood by the traditions of our people and our law."

== Bibliography ==
- Legal Essays BiblioBazaar, 2010, ISBN 9781240028337
- A Preliminary Treatise on Evidence at the Common Law, BiblioLife, 2015, ISBN 9781298978707
