= In re NLRB =

In re Labor Board
- Supreme Court of the United States

Argued May 23, 1938 Decided May 31, 1938
- Full case name: In re Labor Board
- Citations: 304 U.S. 486 (more) 58 S. Ct. 1001; 82 L. Ed. 1482; 1938 U.S. LEXIS 1098

Case history
- Prior: On appeal from the United States Circuit Court of Appeals for the Third Circuit

Holding
- National Labor Relations Act requires transcript filing for enforcement order to proceed in federal court; writs of prohibition and writ of mandamus are appropriate relief when no transcript has been filed.

Court membership
- Chief Justice Charles E. Hughes Associate Justices James C. McReynolds · Louis Brandeis; Pierce Butler · Harlan F. Stone; Owen Roberts · Benjamin N. Cardozo; Hugo Black · Stanley F. Reed

Case opinions
- Majority: Roberts, joined by Hughes, Brandeis, Black, Reed
- Dissent: Butler, joined by McReynolds
- Stone, Cardozo took no part in the consideration or decision of the case.

Laws applied
- National Labor Relations Act

In re Labor Board, 304 U.S. 486 (1938), is a 5-to-2 decision by the Supreme Court of the United States which held that the National Labor Relations Act requires the filing of a petition and a transcript in order for an enforcement order to proceed in federal court, and that a writ of prohibition and writ of mandamus are appropriate measures to take in quashing a petition when no transcript has been filed.

== Background ==
After the passage of the National Labor Relations Act (NLRA) in 1935, the National Labor Relations Board (NLRB) found itself attempting to enforce the law against hundreds of employers, most of whom refused to acknowledge the constitutionality of the NLRA or obey the Board's orders. The Board's practice was to have its Economic Division study the issues and report to the Board; order its attorneys in its Review Division to analyze the case and report to the Board; review the transcripts of the field office trial de novo; receive an oral report about the case from the trial examiner; and have the Chief Counsel's staff prepare a draft decision for Board consideration. But in Morgan v. United States, 298 U.S. 468 (1936) and Morgan v. United States, 304 U.S. 1 (1938), the Supreme Court held that parties in quasi-judicial hearings before the government had the right to be presented with the issues the government was considering, present the agency with a statement, review the proposed findings, review any tentative reports, and submit exceptions and argument to the agency before a final determination is made.

The Steel Workers Organizing Committee (SWOC), a union affiliated with the Congress of Industrial Organizations, had attempted to organize the plants of Republic Steel for several years. On May 26, 1937, members of SWOC to strike Republic Steel. The strike soon spread to Bethlehem Steel, Inland Steel, Jones and Laughlin Steel Company, and Youngstown Sheet and Tube—the so-called "Little Steel" group (because each company was smaller than the giant U.S. Steel). The Little Steel Strike became one of the most famous in American history. Violence quickly engulfed many of the strikes, with both side employing violence. On May 30, 1937, members of the Chicago Police Department shot and killed 10 unarmed union demonstrators near the Republic Steel plant in Chicago in what later became known as the Memorial Day massacre. However, almost 200 SWOC members pleaded guilty to various felony charges (possession of explosives, destruction of property, obstructing passage of the mails, carrying concealed weapons, obstruction of the railroads, etc.) as well.

On June 18, 1937, SWOC filed unfair labor practice charges against Republic Steel for its actions in the Little Steel strike. On April 8, 1938, the NLRB ruled against Republic Steel, ordering the company to reinstate all but 11 strikers on the grounds that the company's "brutal acts of violence" had prompted the union violence. It also ordered Republic Steel to lay off all the replacement workers it had hired. Republic Steel President Tom M. Girdler denounced the decision in a lengthy interview on the front-page of The New York Times the next day, and declared he would not obey it.

Republic Steel filed a suit in federal court on April 18 to have the NLRB's order overturned. The second Morgan decision was issued on April 25, 1938. On May 16, 1938, the NLRB filed a writ of prohibition and writ of mandamus with the U.S. Supreme Court to have the petition quashed, since the agency was considering withdrawing its decision in light of the Morgan decisions.

== Decision ==
=== Majority ruling ===
Associate Justice Owen Roberts wrote the decision for the majority, joined by Chief Justice Charles Evans Hughes and Associate Justices Louis Brandeis, Hugo Black, and Stanley Forman Reed.

Roberts held that filing and serving a petition are not enough to complete a filing with the court of appeals regarding NLRB enforcement actions, and that a transcript of the Board's proceedings also must be filed. If the transcript has not been filed, the NLRB (not the court of appeals) retains the power to withdraw the decision, and the court has no authority to force it to file the transcript. Failure to file the transcript does not deny the petitioner of due process. A writ of prohibition and writ of mandamus, Roberts concluded, were appropriate remedies if the NLRB decided to withdraw its decision before it had filed the transcript.

=== Dissent ===
Associate Justice Pierce Butler dissented, joined by Associate Justice James Clark McReynolds.

Relying on In re New York & Porto Rico Steamship Co., 155 U.S. 523 (1895) and Ex Parte Chicago, Rock Island & Pacific Railway Company, 255 U.S. 273 (1921), Butler held that writs of prohibition and mandamus were appropriate only when the lower court had no jurisdiction to hear a case. The majority's ruling was flawed, he said, because it would allow the NLRB to avoid judicial review of its orders simply by not filing transcripts. Butler would have refused the writs.

== Bibliography ==
- Gross, James A. The Reshaping of the National Labor Relations Board: National Labor Policy in Transition, 1937-1947. Albany, N.Y.: State University of New York Press, 1981.
- "Girdler Sees Bias in NLRB Decision." New York Times. April 11, 1938.
