= Battle of Bielsa pocket =

- Part of the Spanish Civil War
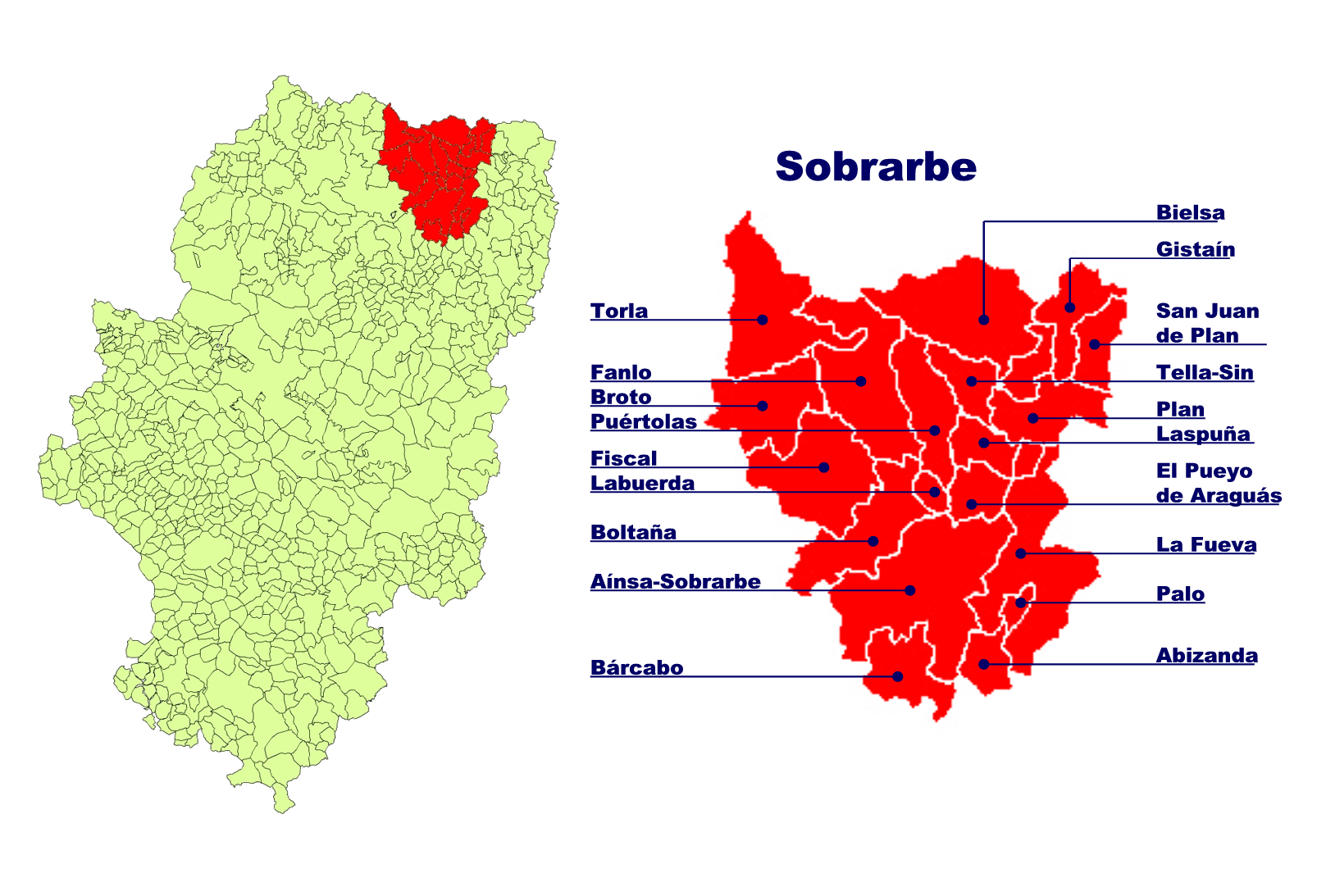
- Location of Bielsa in Aragon.
Date	14 April – 16 June 1938
Location	Huesca, Aragon, Spain 42°38′01″N 0°13′06″E
Result	Nationalist victory

Belligerents
Spanish Republic	Nationalist Spain

Commanders and leaders
Antonio Beltran; Andreu Xandri i Serrano	José Solchaga; José Iruretagoyena

Strength
7,000 men 4 artillery guns	14,000 men 30 artillery guns

Casualties and losses
Unknown but high	Unknown
- Location within Spain Battle of Bielsa pocket (Europe)

The Battle of Bielsa pocket took place between 14 April and 15 June 1938, during the Spanish Civil War. After the fall of the Aragon front, a Republican division, in April 1938, was surrounded by the Nationalists in the Cinca River Valley. The division, despite being heavily outnumbered, managed to hold until 6 July and then crossed the French frontier.

== Background ==
After the Battle of Teruel, the Nationalists led by the general Fidel Dávila, launched an offensive in the Aragon front in March 1938. The Nationalists broke the Republican lines, pursued them and by April, the Nationalists reached the Mediterranean sea at Vinaròs and the River Segre, occupying Aragon. One republican division was isolated by the Nationalist advance in the valley of the Alto Cinca river, near the French Frontier. By the end of March, the 43rd division of the Republican Army, led by Antonio Beltran, nicknamed El Esquinazado (The Dodger), was surrounded by the Nationalist troops in the Cinca River Valley.

== The Bielsa pocket ==
The 43rd division had around 7,000 men with four guns and no air cover. In this front the Nationalists concentrated a force of 14,000 men with 30 artillery guns and overwhelming air power. Virtually isolated, without ammunition reserves, and outnumbered, the Republican troops managed to halt the Nationalist attacks due to the difficult terrain, the bad weather, and the dogged resistance of the troops, but by the end of May it became clear that further resistance was impossible. The Republican troops evacuated 4,000 civilians to France and then retreated slowly across the French frontier. On 6 June the town of Bielsa fell and on the night of 15–16 June all the Republican troops crossed into France.

== Aftermath ==
This battle had no military importance, but the resistance of the Esquinazado division, after the disaster of the Aragon retreat, was a morale boost for the Republicans. Furthermore, the French government allowed the Republican soldiers to choose between returning to the Republican held territory or the Nationalist held territory. 411 soldiers and five nurses chose the Nationalist held territory, more than 6,000 the Republican held territory.

== See also ==
- List of Spanish Republican military equipment of the Spanish Civil War
- List of Spanish Nationalist military equipment of the Spanish Civil War

== Bibliography ==
- Thomas, Hugh. (2001). The Spanish Civil War. Penguin Books. London.
