= Plea bargaining in the United States =

Plea bargaining in the United States is very common; the vast majority of criminal cases in the United States are settled by plea bargain rather than by a jury trial. They have also been increasing in frequency—they rose from 84% of federal cases in 1984 to 94% by 2001. Plea bargains are subject to the approval of the court, and different States and jurisdictions have different rules. Game theory has been used to analyze the plea bargaining decision.

The constitutionality of plea bargaining was established by Brady v. United States in 1970, although the Supreme Court warned that plea incentives which were sufficiently large or coercive as to over-rule defendants' abilities to act freely, or used in a manner giving rise to a significant number of innocent people pleading guilty, might be prohibited or lead to concerns over constitutionality. Santobello v. New York added that when plea bargains are broken, legal remedies exist.

Several features of the American justice system tend to promote plea bargaining. The adversarial nature of the system puts judges in a passive role, in which they are completely dependent upon the parties to develop the factual record and cannot independently discover information with which to assess the strength of the case against the defendant. The parties thus can control the outcome of the case by exercising their rights or bargaining them away. The lack of compulsory prosecution also gives prosecutors greater discretion. And the inability of crime victims to mount a private prosecution and their limited ability to influence plea agreements also tends to encourage plea bargaining. These inducements to plea bargaining have been described as a "trial penalty", and prosecutors have been described as monopsonists.

== History and constitutionality ==
=== Early history ===
Plea bargaining has existed for centuries; in older legal systems convictions were at times routinely procured by confession, and laws existed covering such criminal confessions, although by the 18th century inducements had been forbidden in English Law to prevent miscarriage of justice. Accordingly, early US plea bargain history led to courts' permitting withdrawal of pleas and rejection of plea bargains, although such arrangements continued to happen behind the scenes. A rise in the scale and scope of criminal law led to plea bargaining's gaining new acceptance in the early 20th century, as courts and prosecutors sought to address an overwhelming influx of cases:

[F]ederal prosecutions under the Prohibition Act terminated in 1930 had become nearly eight times as many as the total number of all pending federal prosecutions in 1914. In a number of urban districts the enforcement agencies maintain that the only practicable way of meeting this situation with the existing machinery of the federal courts ... is for the United States Attorneys to make bargains with defendants or their counsel whereby defendants plead guilty to minor offenses and escape with light penalties.

However, even though over 90% of convictions were based upon plea bargaining by 1930, courts remained reluctant for some time to endorse these when appealed.

=== Modern history (c. 1950 onward) ===
The constitutionality of plea bargaining and its legal footing were established by Brady v. United States (1970). The U.S. Supreme Court warned, in the same decision, that this was conditional only and required appropriate safeguards and usage—namely that plea incentives so large or coercive as to overrule defendants' abilities to act freely, or used in a manner giving rise to a significant number of innocent people pleading guilty, might be prohibited or lead to concerns over constitutionality. Previously, the Court had held in United States v. Jackson that a law was unconstitutional that had the effect of imposing undue fear in a defendant (in that case, the fear of death) to the point it discouraged the exercise of a constitutional right (the 6th Amendment covering the right to a jury trial), and also forced the defendant to act as an unwilling witness against himself in violation of the 5th amendment. The Court stated that:

[T]he plea is more than an admission of past conduct; it is the defendant's consent that judgment of conviction may be entered without a trial—a waiver of his right to trial before a jury or a judge. Waivers of constitutional rights not only must be voluntary but must be knowing, intelligent acts done with sufficient awareness of the relevant circumstances and likely consequences.

The ruling distinguished Brady from other prior cases emphasizing improper confessions, concluding: "we cannot hold that it is unconstitutional for the State to extend a benefit to a defendant who in turn extends a substantial benefit to the State and who demonstrates by his plea that he is ready and willing to admit his crime and to enter the correctional system in a frame of mind that affords hope for success in rehabilitation over a shorter period of time than might otherwise be necessary." It laid down the following conditions for a plea to be valid:

- Defendant must be "fully aware of the direct consequences, including the actual value of any commitments made to him"
- Plea must not be "induced by threats (or promises to discontinue improper harassment), misrepresentation (including unfulfilled or unfulfillable promises), or perhaps by promises that are by their nature improper as having no proper relationship to the prosecutor's business (e. g. bribes)"
- Pleas entered would not become invalid later merely due to a wish to reconsider the judgment which led to them, or better information about the Defendant's or the State's case, or the legal position.
- Plea bargaining "is no more foolproof than full trials to the court or to the jury. Accordingly, we take great precautions against unsound results. [...] We would have serious doubts about this case if the encouragement of guilty pleas by offers of leniency substantially increased the likelihood that defendants, advised by competent counsel, would falsely condemn themselves. But our view is to the contrary and is based on our expectations that courts will satisfy themselves that pleas of guilty are voluntarily and intelligently made by competent defendants with adequate advice of counsel and that there is nothing to question the accuracy and reliability of the defendants' admissions".
- The ruling in Brady does not discuss "situation[s] where the prosecutor or judge, or both, deliberately employ their charging and sentencing powers to induce a particular defendant to tender a plea of guilty. In Brady's case there is no claim that the prosecutor threatened prosecution on a charge not justified by the evidence or that the trial judge threatened Brady with a harsher sentence if convicted after trial in order to induce him to plead guilty."

Santobello v. New York added that when plea bargains are broken, remedies exist; and it has been argued that given the prevalence of plea agreements, the most important rights of the accused may be found in the law of contracts rather than the law of trial procedure.

Litigation is pending that could determine whether alleged victims of federal crime have a right to be informed by a U.S. Attorney before plea bargains are entered with a defendant.

== Federal system ==
The Federal Sentencing Guidelines are followed in federal cases and have been created to ensure a standard of uniformity in all cases decided in the federal courts. A two- or three-level offense level reduction is usually available for those who accept responsibility by not holding the prosecution to the burden of proving its case.

The Federal Rules of Criminal Procedure provide for two main types of plea agreements. An 11(c)(1)(B) agreement does not bind the court; the prosecutor's recommendation is merely advisory, and the defendant cannot withdraw his plea if the court decides to impose a sentence other than what was stipulated in the agreement. An 11(c)(1)(C) agreement does bind the court once the court accepts the agreement. When such an agreement is proposed, the court can reject it if it disagrees with the proposed sentence, in which case the defendant has an opportunity to withdraw his plea.

== State systems ==
Plea bargains are so common in the Superior Courts of California that the Judicial Council of California has published an optional seven-page form (containing all mandatory advisements required by federal and state law) to help prosecutors and defense attorneys reduce such bargains into written plea agreements. New Hampshire and Wisconsin have also published similar forms, though they are much shorter than the California form because their state laws do not require as many advisements as California and do not require the defendant to repeatedly write his or her initials next to each separate group of advisements.

In California, plea bargaining is sometimes used in proceedings for involuntary commitment for mental disorder. Some individuals alleged to be dangerous to self and/or dangerous to others bargain to be classified instead as merely "gravely disabled."

== Controversy ==
The use of plea bargaining has inspired some controversy over issues such as its potentially coercive effect on incarcerated defendants, defendants who have been charged with more serious offenses than the facts warrant, and innocent defendants, all of whom might feel pressured to enter into a plea bargain to avoid the more serious consequences that would result from conviction. A 2024 study in the American Political Science Review found that under a range of scenarios ("for example, if criminals are more risk-seeking than the wrongfully accused, or if prosecutors derive a career benefit from trial wins"), the innocent are more likely to enter into guilty pleas than the guilty.

A theory was put forth that an informal courtroom work group is secretly formed between judge, defense attorney and prosecutor, wherein the goal then becomes to speed cases through rather than to ensure that justice is served.

=== Coercive effect ===
Plea bargaining is also criticized, particularly outside the United States, on the grounds that its close relationship with rewards, threats and coercion potentially endangers the correct legal outcome.

In the book Presumed Guilty: When Innocent People Are Wrongly Convicted (1991), author Martin Yant discusses the use of coercion in plea bargaining.

Even when the charges are more serious, prosecutors often can still bluff defense attorneys and their clients into pleading guilty to a lesser offense. As a result, people who might have been acquitted because of lack of evidence, but also who are in fact truly innocent, will often plead guilty to the charge. Why? In a word, fear. And the more numerous and serious the charges, studies have shown, the greater the fear. That explains why prosecutors sometimes seem to file every charge imaginable against defendants.

The theoretical work based on the prisoner's dilemma is one reason why, in many countries, plea bargaining is forbidden. Often, precisely the prisoner's dilemma scenario applies: it is in the interest of both suspects to confess and testify against the other suspect, irrespective of the innocence of the accused. Arguably, the worst case is when only one party is guilty—here, the innocent one is unlikely to confess, while the guilty one is likely to confess and testify against the innocent.

=== Judicial efficiency ===
The United States Supreme Court has recognized plea bargaining as both an essential and desirable part of the criminal justice system. The benefits of plea-bargaining are said to be obvious: the relief of court congestion, alleviation of the risks and uncertainties of trial, and its information gathering value.

In 1975 the Attorney-General of Alaska, Avrum Gross, ordered an end to all plea-bargaining; subsequent attorneys-general continued the practice. Similar consequences were observed in New Orleans, Ventura County, California, and in Oakland County, Michigan, where plea bargaining has been terminated. Bidinotto found:

...ending plea bargaining has put responsibility back into every level of our system: police did better investigating; prosecutors and lawyers began preparing their cases better; lazy judges were compelled to spend more time in court and control their calendars more efficiently. Most importantly, justice was served—and criminals began to realize that they could not continue their arrogant manipulation of a paper-tiger court system.

Some argue that plea bargaining in Alaska never fully ended, and that the result may not be a true indication of what could occur if plea bargaining was fully abolished.

Another argument against plea bargaining is that it may not actually reduce the costs of administering justice. For example, if a prosecutor has only a 25% chance of winning his case and sending the defendant away to prison for 10 years, he may make a plea agreement for a one-year sentence; but if plea bargaining is unavailable, he may drop the case completely.

Plea bargaining may allow prosecutors to allocate their resources more efficiently, such that they may direct more time and resources to the trial of suspects charged with serious offenses.

=== Impact on average sentences ===
The shadow-of-trial argument asserts that in the aggregate, plea agreements merely reflect the outcome that would have transpired had the case gone to trial. For example, if the accused faces 10 years and has a 50% chance of losing in court, then an agreement will result in a five-year sentence, less some amount deducted for saving the government the cost of trial. Theoretically, the shadow-of-trial should work even better in criminal cases than in civil cases, because civil judgments are discretionary, while criminal judgments are often regulated by mandatory minima and sentencing guidelines, making sentences more predictable.

A counter-argument is that criminal sentencing laws are "lumpy", in that the sentencing ranges are not as precise as the dollars-and-cents calibration that can be achieved in civil case settlements. Furthermore, because some defendants facing small amounts of prison time are jailed pending trial, they may find it in their interests to plead guilty so as to be sentenced to time served, or in any event to end up serving less time than they would serve waiting for trial. Outcomes in criminal cases are also made less predictable by the fact that, while a plaintiff in a civil case has a financial incentive to seek the largest judgment possible, a prosecutor does not necessarily have an incentive to pursue the most severe sentence possible.

=== Constitutionality ===
Some legal scholars argue that plea bargaining is unconstitutional because it takes away a person's right to a trial by jury. Justice Hugo Black once noted that, in America, the defendant "has an absolute, unqualified right to compel the State to investigate its own case, find its own witnesses, prove its own facts, and convince the jury through its own resources. Throughout the process, the defendant has a fundamental right to remain silent, in effect challenging the State at every point to 'Prove it!'" It is argued that plea bargaining is inconsistent with limits imposed on the powers of the police and prosecutors by the Bill of Rights. This position has been rejected by the nation's courts.
