= Courtroom workgroup =

American criminal justice term

In the United States criminal justice system, a Courtroom workgroup is an informal arrangement between a criminal prosecutor, criminal defense attorney, and the judicial officer. This foundational concept in the academic discipline of criminal justice recharacterizes the seemingly adversarial courtroom participants as collaborators in "doing justice." The courtroom workgroup was proposed by Eisenstein and Jacob in 1977 to explain their observations of the ways courts, especially lower level courts, actually come to decisions.

Because the courtroom workgroup deviates from the public consensus of how justice works, it has developed a deviant set of rules to continue its work and facilitate daily life for its participants. The academic theory of the courtroom workgroup has four cornerstone concepts that recognize this fact: Speed, Pragmatic Cynicism, Collegiality, and Secrecy. Efficient courtroom workgroups seek to process cases rather than dispense justice. This has been confirmed to greater and lesser extents in different courts. Defendants are assumed to be guilty. The procedural merits of the case are the true determinative factors of an outcome. Prosecutors and defense attorneys engage in a comparison of charges against possible procedural flaws and possible defenses to arrive at the going rate for a crime. These factors are used to determine how much punishment the plea bargain will offer. For example, group relationships and the desire to "maintain" a healthy working relationship are important to group members. The workings of the courtroom group and the "going rate" for given crimes are not matters for public disclosure. Estimates can be given to clients, but usually couched in terms of the prosecution's willingness to negotiate. (Summarized by O'Connor, T.R., 2005)

The courtroom workgroup is a mechanism for prosecutorial discretion. Various techniques are used to convince the defendant that the evidence against him or her is overwhelming. “Charge stacking” is a process by which police and prosecutors create a case with numerous charges or numerous instances of the same charge to convince the defendant that the risk of not pleading guilty is intolerable. The defendant may be convinced to plead guilty to a few of the charges in return for not being prosecuted for the remaining charges.

The courtroom workgroup is, in some sense, a response to a lack of resources for public defenders. Defense attorneys in public defender offices often do not have sufficient time to prepare a case in detail for all of their clients. Further, they often do not have the budget to fully investigate the facts of a case through either staff or private investigators. They often must rely solely on police reports for such information. In some jurisdictions, clients do not meet their attorneys until they are in court. Typically, public defenders will meet briefly with clients in holding facilities or jails. The defense attorney defends his or her client by seeking less punishment. Huemann (1977) indicates that many defense attorneys feel pressured to keep up with their caseloads. This pressure can manifest in the courtroom through rebukes by the judge for delays. Many subtle pressures combine to encourage participation in the courtroom workgroup.

The concept of a courtroom workgroup is associated with plea bargaining. The courtroom workgroup shows remarkable explanatory power in overburdened courts dealing with large caseloads. The courtroom workgroup model is best suited to explain jurisdictions where defense attorneys are more or less permanently assigned, but even occasionally appointed lawyers can participate in these practices. While many of the higher level prosecutions still follow the adversarial model, there is evidence that lower-level proceedings follow the courtroom workgroup model. Boland, Brady, Tyson, & Bassler (1983) indicate that approximately 90 percent of criminal cases are settled by plea bargain. This figure appears to be stable in the period between 1980 and 2000 (Rainville & Reaves, 2003). Some collaborative efforts on the part of the courtroom workgroup simply must be present to facilitate this high percentage of pleas.

In jurisdictions with drug courts, mental health courts, or pretrial diversion programs, the courtroom workgroup has expanded to include other actors and roles. Caseworkers and treatment providers often work closely with judges and prosecutors and influence their decision-making. Research on diversion has found that these new members can encourage other members of the workgroup to bring or keep more people under court supervision so that they can be referred to treatment.
