= The Process Is the Punishment =

1979 sociology book by Malcolm Feeley

The Process Is the Punishment is a seminal work in sociology of law written by Malcolm Feeley in 1979. The book is a case study of the New Haven Court of Common Pleas, a lower court that ruled on minor felonies and misdemeanors. The most important contribution of the book is the argument that punishment for minor crimes is meted out before guilt or innocence is determined and that a wide range of actors affect the severity of the punishment, including bondsmen and prosecutors, but generally excluding judges.

== Summary ==
The Process Is the Punishment meticulously describes the operation of the lower courts in New Haven, Connecticut, the defendants who face minor felony or misdemeanor charges there, and the process defendants face in court. Feeley found that pre-trial court processes were so expensive for defendants that they almost universally avoided trials and most cases were resolved by plea bargaining. There were no trials in the study of 1600 cases.

The three main themes of the book are

1. Understanding the courts as an open system where patronage and politics influence the court environment,
2. Substantive vs. procedural justice—arguing that the courts serve the former but neglect the latter, and
3. the importance of pre-trial costs.

Feeley's study found that defendants pled guilty because the expense of the pre-trial process outweighed the sentence for relatively minor charges that defendants face in the lower courts; and it wasn't worth the money to invoke their due process rights.

== Reception and legacy ==
The Michigan Law Review found that "fascinating vignettes" interspersed with analysis made interesting reading and that the book addressed a gap in socio-legal scholarship around lower courts and minor charges.

Reviewers found that the book was complex but easy to read. Some critics expressed that the organization of the book might have obscured some of its core themes.

Some of the book's arguments had a "truly substantial" impact on the field of socio-legal studies. Most initial reviews discussed the book's argument that punishment for crimes is meted out before guilt or innocence is determined and that a wide range of actors affect the severity of the punishment, including bondsmen and prosecutors, but generally excluding judges.

Although Feeley's arguments about the pre-trial process are the most important contribution of the book, The Process Is the Punishment also drew more scholarly attention to lower courts in general and the roles of ancillary actors on case outcomes. The book's discussion of substantive vs procedural justice also contributed to later work in court reform.

A 2019 review at the fortieth anniversary of the books publication suggested that arguments in The Process Is the Punishment could be adapted to make sense of mass incarceration in the criminal justice system, and that the book's central observation was more useful at that time than when it was written.

The book was republished in 1992 with a new foreword and preface.
