= Trial penalty =

In the United States, the trial penalty refers to the difference between the smaller sentence offered to a defendant in a plea bargain prior to a criminal trial versus the larger sentence the defendant could receive if they elect to go to trial. It sits at the center of a legal debate over whether trial penalties abridge defendants' Sixth Amendment right to trial.

== Background ==
In a plea bargain, a criminal defendant waives their right to trial and agrees to plead guilty to a lesser charge than would have been brought against them at trial or agrees to plead guilty to the original charge in exchange for a sentence that is less than the maximum possible. Plea bargaining is pervasive in the United States, with most criminal defendants accepting a plea deal rather than going to trial. At the federal level, just 2% of defendants elect to go to trial.

The constitutionality of plea bargaining has been repeatedly affirmed by the United States Supreme Court (e.g. Brady v. United States), provided that the defendant enter into the plea deal voluntarily.

== Definition ==
The trial penalty is the "discrepancy between the sentence the prosecutor is willing to offer in exchange for a guilty plea and the sentence that would be imposed after a trial". Many plea bargains require that the defendant waive certain constitutional rights, such as the right to challenge unlawfully procured evidence and the right to appeal; the loss of these rights is also sometimes considered part of the trial penalty.

== Criticism ==
=== Right to trial ===
Critics argue that the trial penalty has the effect of depriving defendants' of their Sixth Amendment right to "a speedy and public trial". A 2015 statistical analysis of federal cases by Andrew Chongesh Kim concluded that defendants who exercise their right to trial are penalized with sentences 64% longer than they would have received had they accepted a plea deal. Kim argues that this makes trial by jury "less of a right and more of a trap for fools".

The National Association of Criminal Defense Lawyers (NACDL) has been a particularly harsh critic of the trial penalty, arguing that it is "now so severe and pervasive that it has virtually eliminated the constitutional right to a trial", which has had the consequence of replacing the system of trial by jury laid out in the United States Constitution with a system of plea bargains. Trial penalties, they point out, impose such harsh sanctions on choosing to go to trial—with prosecutors sometimes threatening multi-decade prison sentences if a plea deal of only a few years is not accepted—that trial penalties amount to coercing defendants to plead guilty. This coercion, they argue, renders plea bargains unconstitutional.

The lawyer Alan Dershowitz has also called the trial penalty unconstitutional. In the Wall Street Journal, he argued that trial penalties render most plea bargains unconstitutional because they amount to a punishment for exercising the right to trial, and any right is abridged "when you're punished for exercising it".

=== Presumption of innocence ===
The National Association of Criminal Defense Lawyers (NACDL) has argued that trial penalties strip defendants of their presumption of innocence, pointing out that the "pressures defendants face in the plea bargaining process are so strong even innocent people can be convinced to plead guilty to crimes they did not commit". The Association argues that this casts doubt "on the assumption that defendants who plead guilty do so voluntarily".
