= Prosecutorial discretion =

Principle in numerous legal systems

In common law, the principle of prosecutorial discretion allows public prosecutors a wide latitude to decide whether or not to charge a person for a crime, and which charges to file. A similar principle in continental law countries is called the principle of opportunity.

There is a divide between countries where prosecutions are generally discretionary and where prosecutions are mandatory (known as the legality principle or compulsory prosecution). In addition, in some countries prosecutors operate independently with more discretion vs in a hierarchical system that require more conformity.

Countries following civil law are predominately based on the principle of compulsory prosecution, although the principle of opportunity is encoded in law in the Netherlands, Germany, Sweden, Slovenia, Belgian law and France. Some similar provisions exist in and in Estonian law.

== By country ==
=== United States ===
In the United States federal system, the prosecutor has wide latitude in determining when, who, how, and even whether to prosecute for apparent violations of federal criminal law. The prosecutor's broad discretion in such areas as initiating or forgoing prosecutions, selecting or recommending specific charges, and terminating prosecutions by accepting guilty pleas has been recognized on numerous occasions by the courts. Prosecutors may decide not to press the charges even when there is probable cause, if they determine that there is no reasonable likelihood of conviction. (Note: See State v. Gomez, 127 P.3d 873, 877 (Ariz. 2006) ("Indictments can be dismissed for various reasons, including a prosecutor's determination that the person charged did not in fact commit the crime or—as this case illustrates—that there is no reasonable likelihood of conviction.")..) Prosecutors may dismiss charges in this situation by seeking a voluntary dismissal or nolle prosequi.

The United States Supreme Court said in Wayte v. United States 470 U.S. 598 (1985):

In our criminal justice system, the Government retains "broad discretion" as to whom to prosecute. [...] This broad discretion rests largely on the recognition that the decision to prosecute is particularly ill-suited to judicial review. Such factors as the strength of the case, the prosecution's general deterrence value, the Government's enforcement priorities, and the case's relationship to the Government's overall enforcement plan are not readily susceptible to the kind of analysis the courts are competent to undertake.

Yick Wo v. Hopkins (1886) was the first case where the United States Supreme Court ruled that a law that is race-neutral on its face, but is administered in a prejudicial manner, is an infringement of the Equal Protection Clause in the Fourteenth Amendment to the U.S. Constitution.

Scholarly study of prosecutorial discretion in the US has reported a wide variance among prosecutors' responses to the same potential scenario. The scholars who conducted the study reported observing prosecutors who appeared to be motivated to do justice but who lacked guidelines and supervision.

=== France ===
The principle of opportunity to prosecute (opportunité des poursuites) belongs to the Public Prosecutor's Office. It is a power that is conferred by article 40-1 of the French code of criminal procedure.

The prosecutor may decide not to prosecute a case that has the characteristics of a criminal case, and instead to dismiss the charges. However, this does not prevent the initial suspect—and the victim who filed the complaint—from being registered in the System for Processing Recorded Offenses (Système de traitement des infractions constatées, STIC).

=== The Netherlands ===
In Dutch law it is called opportuniteitsbeginsel, lit. 'principle of opportunity'. Cancelling the prosecution of a crime is called a sepot or seponering in Dutch and is mentioned in the Dutch Criminal Procedure Code (Articles 12 to 13a).

There are three types of cancellation of prosecution:

- policy sepot: petty crimes are not prosecuted to free up capacity in the legal system and to prosecute serious crimes.
- technical sepot: there is not enough evidence to obtain a conviction from a court or such a conviction is highly unlikely.
- conditional sepot: the crime suspect is spared from being prosecuted if the suspect commits no other crimes. In Belgium, this is called a "praetorian probation".

A crime whose prosecution is cancelled can still be resumed later (the ne bis in idem principle does not apply to sepots), unless the Public Department has made a formal communication to the crime suspect that the suspect is no longer prosecuted (then, prosecution cannot be resumed according to the principle of administrative law trustworthiness).

According to Article 12 of the Dutch Criminal Procedure Code, a person with a direct concern in the prosecution of a crime may file a complaint at a court of law against the cancellation of the prosecution. If the council chamber of the court decides that the crime should be prosecuted, the crime must be prosecuted.

=== Japan ===
In order to encourage reconciliation and restitution, most cases in Japan are resolved through discretionary prosecution. Discretion may be exercised due a wide range of reasons including age, character, circumstances of the offense or even due to events following the offense.

=== Germany ===
In German law, it is called Opportunitätsprinzip, lit. 'opportunity principle'.

=== Singapore ===
Under Article 35(8) of the Constitution of Singapore, as well as Section 11 of the Criminal Procedure Code, the Attorney-General of Singapore is also the Public Prosecutor. Deputy Public Prosecutors (DPPs) and Assistant Public Prosecutors (APPs), legal officers from the Attorney-General's Chambers (AGC) Crime Division, act under the authority of the Public Prosecutor. As Public Prosecutor, the Attorney-General has prosecutorial discretion; i.e. he may, at his discretion, institute, conduct or discontinue any proceedings for any offense.

Prosecutorial discretion grants AGC the power to institute, conduct or discontinue any prosecution at his discretion. The prosecution bears the burden of proof and is required to prove its case beyond a reasonable doubt. This means that in order for a defendant to be found guilty, the case presented by the prosecution must be enough to remove any reasonable doubt in the mind of the judge(s) that the defendant is guilty of the crime with which he/she is charged.

== See also ==
- Miscarriage of justice
- Nolle prosequi, a generalised form of the principle of opportunity
- Selective enforcement, a general principle of law enforcement
- Selective prosecution, a defense strategy claiming discrimination
- Sentencing disparity

== Works cited ==
- République française; Secrétariat général du gouvernement (19 October 2022). "Légifrance Le service public de la diffusion du droit" [The public service for dissemination of the law]. Légifrance. Direction de l'information légale et administrative. ISSN 2270-8987. OCLC 867599055.
- Doucet, Jean-Paul (11 April 2019). "Dictionnaire de droit criminel" [Dictionary of Criminal Law] (in French). Archived from the original on 7 January 2023.
