= List of United States Supreme Court cases, volume 404 =

This is a list of all the United States Supreme Court cases from volume 404 of the United States Reports:

Case name	Citation	Date decided
Hicks v. Pleasure House, Inc.	404 U.S. 1	1971
Arciniega v. Freeman	404 U.S. 4	1971
Superintendent of Ins. v. Bankers Life & Cas. Co.	404 U.S. 6	1971
Younger v. Gilmore	404 U.S. 15	1971
McClanahan v. Morauer & Hartzell, Inc.	404 U.S. 16	1971
Engelman v. Amos	404 U.S. 23	1971
Jennings v. Mahoney	404 U.S. 25	1971
Doherty v. United States	404 U.S. 28	1971
Norfolk & W.R.R. Co. v. Nemitz	404 U.S. 37	1971
Slayton v. Smith	404 U.S. 53	1971
Harris v. Washington	404 U.S. 55	1971
Cruz v. Hauck	404 U.S. 59	1971
Schreiner v. United States	404 U.S. 67	1971
Camp v. Arkansas	404 U.S. 69	1971
Pease v. Hansen	404 U.S. 70	1971
Reed v. Reed	404 U.S. 71	1971
Richardson v. Belcher	404 U.S. 78	1971
Chevron Oil Co. v. Huson	404 U.S. 97	1971
NLRB v. Plasterers	404 U.S. 116	1971
NLRB v. Nash-Finch Co.	404 U.S. 138	1971
Chem. Workers v. Pitts. Plate Glass Co.	404 U.S. 157	1971
Mayer v. City of Chicago	404 U.S. 189	1971
Victory Carriers, Inc. v. Law	404 U.S. 202	1971
Britt v. North Carolina	404 U.S. 226	1971
North Carolina v. Rice	404 U.S. 244	1971
Wilwording v. Swenson	404 U.S. 249	1971
O'Keeffe v. Aerojet-General Shipyards, Inc.	404 U.S. 254	1971
Santobello v. New York	404 U.S. 257	1971
Picard v. Connor	404 U.S. 270	1971
Townsend v. Swank	404 U.S. 282	1971
United States v. Campos-Serrano	404 U.S. 293	1971
United States v. Marion	404 U.S. 307	1971
United States v. Bass	404 U.S. 336	1971
Schilb v. Kuebel	404 U.S. 357	1971
United States v. Louisiana (1971)	404 U.S. 388	1971
SEC v. Med. Comm. for Human Rights	404 U.S. 403	1972
Diffenderfer v. Cent. Baptist Church	404 U.S. 412	1972
Reliance Elec. Co. v. Emerson Elec. Co.	404 U.S. 418	1972
United States v. Tucker	404 U.S. 443	1972
FPC v. Fla. Power & Light Co.	404 U.S. 453	1972
Lego v. Twomey	404 U.S. 477	1972
Groppi v. Leslie	404 U.S. 496	1972
Cal. Motor Transport Co. v. Trucking Unlimited	404 U.S. 508	1972
Haines v. Kerner	404 U.S. 519	1972
Love v. Pullman Co.	404 U.S. 522	1972
Trbovich v. Mine Workers	404 U.S. 528	1972
Univ. of Tex. System v. New Left Ed. Project	404 U.S. 541	1972
United States v. Chas. Pfizer & Co.	404 U.S. 548	1972
Connor v. Williams	404 U.S. 549	1972
In re Little	404 U.S. 553	1972
United States v. Standard Oil Co.	404 U.S. 558	1972
United States v. Christian Echoes Nat'l Ministry, Inc.	404 U.S. 561	1972
Bradley v. United States	404 U.S. 567	1972
Mahan v. Howell	404 U.S. 1201	1971
NLRB v. Getman	404 U.S. 1204	1971
Edgar v. United States	404 U.S. 1206	1971
Russo v. United States	404 U.S. 1209	1971
Corpus Christi Sch. Dist. v. Cisneros	404 U.S. 1211	1971
Lopez v. United States	404 U.S. 1213	1971
Guey Heung Lee v. Johnson	404 U.S. 1215	1971
Jefferson Parish Sch. Bd. v. Dandridge	404 U.S. 1219	1971
Winston-Salem/Forsyth County Bd. of Ed. v. Scott	404 U.S. 1221	1971
Harris v. United States	404 U.S. 1232	1971
Gomperts v. Chase	404 U.S. 1237	1971
Pryor v. United States	404 U.S. 1242	1971
Kadans v. Collins	404 U.S. 1244	1972
