= Guey Heung Lee v. Johnson =

- Supreme Court of the United States

Decided August 25, 1971
- Full case name: Guey Heung Lee, et al. v. David Johnson, et al.
- Citations: 404 U.S. 1215 (more) 92 S. Ct. 14; 30 L. Ed. 2d 19; 1971 U.S. LEXIS 1458

Case history
- Prior: On application for stay pending appeal

Holding
- The Court declined to issue a stay of a Federal District Court's order reassigning pupils of Chinese ancestry to elementary public schools in San Francisco.

Court membership
- Chief Justice Warren E. Burger Associate Justices Hugo Black · William O. Douglas; John M. Harlan II · William J. Brennan Jr. Potter Stewart · Byron White; Thurgood Marshall · Harry Blackmun

Case opinion
- Majority: Douglas, in chambers

Guey Heung Lee v. Johnson, 404 U.S. 1215 (1971), was a United States Supreme Court case regarding the desegregation of schools in San Francisco.

In 1971, the San Francisco Unified School District attempted to desegregate the school system by reassigning pupils attending segregated schools to other public schools. The School District submitted a comprehensive plan for desegregation, which the District Court approved.

Brown v. Board of Education was not written for blacks alone. It rests on the Equal Protection Clause of the Fourteenth Amendment, one of the first beneficiaries of which were the Chinese people of San Francisco. See Yick Wo v. Hopkins, 118 U. S. 356. The theme of our school desegregation cases extends to all racial minorities treated invidiously by a State or any of its agencies.

— Guey Heung Lee v. Johnson, 404 U.S. 1215 (1971), at 1216-1217

Some Chinese parents protested the move, because in the Asian schools the students could learn about their cultural heritage, and they would lose this if they went to public schools.

The Court of Appeals for the Ninth Circuit entered a temporary stay pending a hearing in the District Court. Four days later, however, the Court of Appeals vacated that stay sua sponte. The District Court then denied the stay. Thereupon, a different three-judge panel of the Court of Appeals heard oral argument on the motions for a stay, and denied those motions.

The Supreme Court too denied the stay, saying

So far as the overriding questions of law are concerned, the decision of the District Court seems well within bounds. It would take some intervening event or some novel question of law to induce me as Circuit Justice to overrule the considered action of my Brethren of the Ninth Circuit.

== See also ==
- List of United States Supreme Court cases, volume 404
- Brown v. Board of Education of Topeka (1954)
