= Younger v. Gilmore =

- Supreme Court of the United States

Decided November 8, 1971
- Full case name: Younger v. Gilmore
- Citations: 404 U.S. 15 (more)

Holding
- Imprisoned people have a right to access a law library.

Court membership
- Chief Justice Warren E. Burger Associate Justices William O. Douglas · William J. Brennan Jr. Potter Stewart · Byron White; Thurgood Marshall · Harry Blackmun

Case opinion
- Per curiam

Younger v. Gilmore, 404 U.S. 15 (1971), was a United States Supreme Court case in which the Court held that imprisoned people have a right to access a law library.
