= Santobello v. New York =

- Supreme Court of the United States

Argued November 15, 1971 Decided December 20, 1971
- Full case name: Santobello v. New York
- Citations: 404 U.S. 257 (more) 92 S. Ct. 495; 30 L. Ed. 2d 427; 1971 U.S. LEXIS 1

Court membership
- Chief Justice Warren E. Burger Associate Justices William O. Douglas · William J. Brennan Jr. Potter Stewart · Byron White; Thurgood Marshall · Harry Blackmun

Case opinions
- Majority: Burger, joined by Douglas, White, Blackmun
- Concurrence: Douglas
- Concur/dissent: Marshall, joined by Brennan, Stewart

Santobello v. New York, 404 U.S. 257 (1971), is a United States Supreme Court case in which the Court ruled that the sentence of the defendant should be vacated because the plea agreement specified that the prosecutor would not recommend a sentence, but the prosecutor breached the agreement by recommending the maximum sentence.

== Case background ==
The defendant was charged with two felony counts of gambling; the district attorney agreed to a plea agreement where the defendant would plead guilt to the lesser offense of "possession of gambling records", with a maximum sentence of one year in jail. The prosecutor also agreed to not make a recommendation to the court regarding the sentence. The Court accepted the plea in June 1969 and set a date for subsequent sentencing. However, there was significant delay and Santobello did not appear for sentencing until January 1970. By this time, the original presiding judge had retired and the prosecutor had been replaced. The second prosecutor was ignorant of the plea agreement made by the predecessor and recommended, against the terms of the agreement, the maximum one-year sentence. However the new sentencing judge declared that his decision of the maximum one-year sentence was not influenced by the district attorney, and therefore there was no need to adjourn the sentencing, given the Santobello's probation report, showing him as a "professional criminal". The Court subsequently upheld that the prosecutor had breached the agreement.
