= Acceptance of responsibility =

Acceptance of responsibility is a provision in the United States Federal Sentencing Guidelines providing for a decrease by 2 or 3 levels in offenders' offense level for admitting guilt and otherwise demonstrating behavior consistent with acceptance of responsibility, such as ending criminal conduct and associations. It amounts to a sentence reduction of about 35%. The 3-level reduction is only available to defendants with an offense level of 16 or greater, and it requires a timely guilty plea. Federal plea agreements usually include a stipulation that the government will support granting the defendant the acceptance of responsibility reduction. The guideline states, in reference to the 2-level reduction:

This adjustment is not intended to apply to a defendant who puts the government to its burden of proof at trial by denying the essential factual elements of guilt, is convicted, and only then admits guilt and expresses remorse. Conviction by trial, however, does not automatically preclude a defendant from consideration for such a reduction. In rare situations a defendant may clearly demonstrate an acceptance of responsibility for his criminal conduct even though he exercises his constitutional right to a trial. This may occur, for example, where a defendant goes to trial to assert and preserve issues that do not relate to factual guilt (e.g., to make a constitutional challenge to a statute or a challenge to the applicability of a statute to his conduct). In each such instance, however, a determination that a defendant has accepted responsibility will be based primarily upon pre-trial statements and conduct.

Because the vast majority of federal criminal cases are settled by plea bargains, the application of this reduction is extremely common and has a great impact on the number of prisoner-years served altogether throughout the U.S. justice system. Research indicates that the offender's race/ethnicity, controlling for offender and offense characteristics, has a significant influence on the sentence reduction for acceptance of responsibility. The U.S. Court of Appeals for the Fifth Circuit has held that "lack of remorse" and "acceptance of responsibility" can be separate factors and that a district court may consider each independently of the other. The concept of remorse, within the framework of federal sentencing law, has been described as posing epistemological problems. Some courts use the "acceptance of responsibility" guideline to impose harsher punishments on defendants whose lawyers engage in aggressive forms of representation, such as making factually or legally dubious arguments, seeking tactical delays, or misleading the court. Whether or not a defendant has accepted responsibility for his crime is a factual determination to which most circuits have decided to apply the "clearly erroneous" standard of review. The guideline commentary states, "The reduction of offense level provided by this section recognizes legitimate societal interests. For several reasons, a defendant who clearly demonstrates acceptance of responsibility for his offense by taking, in a timely fashion, the actions listed above (or some equivalent action) is appropriately given a lower offense level than a defendant who has not demonstrated acceptance of responsibility." However, the specific "several reasons" are not provided. A defendant cannot be denied the reduction in sentence provided by § 3E1.1 of the Sentencing Guidelines because he refused to make self-incriminating statements relating to conduct included in counts to which he had not pleaded guilty and which were dismissed as part of a plea agreement.
