= United States v. Jackson =

- Supreme Court of the United States

Argued December 7, 1967 Decided April 8, 1968
- Full case name: United States v. Jackson et al.
- Citations: 390 U.S. 570 (more) 88 S. Ct. 1209; 20 L. Ed. 2d 138

Case history
- Prior: 262 F. Supp. 716 (D. Conn. 1967)
- Subsequent: Clarified in Brady v. United States

Holding
- The Federal Kidnapping Act unconstitutionally coerces defendants from exercising their right to a trial by jury.

Court membership
- Chief Justice Earl Warren Associate Justices Hugo Black · William O. Douglas; John M. Harlan II · William J. Brennan Jr. Potter Stewart · Byron White; Abe Fortas · Thurgood Marshall

Case opinions
- Majority: Stewart, joined by Warren, Douglas, Harlan, Brennan, Fortas
- Dissent: White, joined by Black
- Marshall took no part in the consideration or decision of the case.

Laws applied
- U.S. Const. amends. V, VI, Federal Kidnapping Act

United States v. Jackson, 390 U.S. 570 (1968), was a United States Supreme Court decision that ruled part of the Federal Kidnapping Act unconstitutional.

== Background ==
In the wake of the Lindbergh kidnapping Congress decided to adopt a federal kidnapping statute. It was designed to allow federal authorities to step in during kidnappings. Congress believed that federal agents would be more effective than local authorities. The act held that anyone who knowingly transports any person who is unlawfully kidnapped and held for ransom shall be punished by death if the kidnapped person is not liberated unharmed and the jury recommends it. On October 10, 1966 a federal grand jury in Connecticut returned an indictment charging the defendant under the Act. The District Court for the District of Connecticut dismissed this count of the indictment, holding that the Federal Kidnapping Act is unconstitutional because it makes the risk of death the price for asserting the right to a jury trial.

== Opinion of the Court ==
The decision of the court was delivered by Justice Stewart. The court partially agreed with the District Court. The court objected to the fact the Act stated the defendant "shall be punished...by death...". Under the law the trial judge is obliged to sentence the defendant to death if the jury recommends it. Sentencing in American courts has long been the right of the sitting judge and not the jury. While the jury may make recommendations the court found that the Congress has overstepped when it gave that power solely to the jury.

The court also objected, as the District Court had, that the Act could punish a defendant for asserting their right to a jury trial. Under the Act, a defendant who pleads guilty cannot be sentenced to death, since no jury has the chance to recommend the death penalty. However, if the defendant attempted an acquittal by going to trial, he would be risking his life if the jury found him guilty. The majority found that the "inevitable effect of any such provision is, of course, to discourage assertion of the Fifth Amendment right not to plead guilty and to deter exercise of the Sixth Amendment right to demand a jury trial."

However, the majority disagreed with the District Court's assertion that the Federal Kidnapping Act fails entirely because its penalty clause is deficient. The court determined that the part of the Act which details punishment is severable from the rest of the act. The judgment of the District Court was reversed and sent back for further proceedings.

=== Dissent ===
Justice White dissented, with Justice Black joining. While he agreed that some defendants would be coerced by the law, Justice White argued that because not every defendant would be coerced by the law it should not be ruled unconstitutional. He argued that pleas of guilt should be carefully examined before being accepted to make sure that they have been not coerced by the threat of capital punishment.

== Subsequent developments ==
The Court revisited the issue of the Federal Kidnapping Act in Brady v. United States (1970), in which the Court reinforced its decision that not all guilty pleas entered under the Act were invalid.

== See also ==
- Brady v. United States
- Federal Kidnapping Act
