= Compulsory prosecution =

Principle requiring prosecutors to file charges when evidence is sufficient

Compulsory prosecution is an aspect of certain justice systems in which the prosecutor is required to press charges if there is sufficient evidence to support a conviction. This stands in contrast with discretionary prosecution, where prosecutors are given a wide latitude whether and how to prosecute.

Compulsory prosecution system is used in Germany. It has also been required by the Constitution of Italy since 1948. In the United States and other countries that do not require compulsory prosecution, the lack of such a requirement has a tendency to encourage the practice of plea bargaining.

A 2012 comparison in the context of game theory suggests "that mandatory prosecution outperforms discretionary prosecution when evidence transmission from the prosecutor to the judge is accurate and/or when the cost of litigation incurred by the prosecutor is large."

== See also ==
- Prosecutorial discretion
- Public prosecutor
