= Brady v. United States =

- Supreme Court of the United States

Argued November 18, 1969 Decided May 4, 1970
- Full case name: Robert Malvais Brady v. United States
- Citations: 397 U.S. 742 (more) 90 S. Ct. 1463, 25 L. Ed. 2d 747

Case history
- Prior: 404 F.2d 601 (10th Cir. 1968); cert. granted, 395 U.S. 976 (1969).
- Subsequent: On remand, 433 F.2d 924 (10th Cir. 1970).

Holding
- The threat of the death penalty is not coercive if the guilty plea is made intelligently and willingly.

Court membership
- Chief Justice Warren E. Burger Associate Justices Hugo Black · William O. Douglas; John M. Harlan II · William J. Brennan Jr. Potter Stewart · Byron White; Thurgood Marshall

Case opinions
- Majority: White, joined by Burger, Harlan, Stewart
- Concurrence: Black
- Concurrence: Brennan, joined by Douglas, Marshall

Laws applied
- U.S. Const. amend. V Federal Kidnapping Act

Brady v. United States, 397 U.S. 742 (1970), was a United States Supreme Court case in which the Court refused to hold that large sentencing discounts and threats of the death penalty are sufficient evidence of coercion.

== Background ==
=== Trial ===
Robert Brady was indicted in 1959 for kidnapping and failing to release the hostage without harm, which under 18 U.S.C. § 1201(a) imposed a maximum penalty of death if the jury recommended it. When he learned that his co-defendant had confessed to the crime and agreed to testify against him Brady changed his plea from not guilty to guilty. The trial judge twice questioned him on whether the plea was made voluntarily.

The Court: …Having read the presentence report and the statement you made to the probation office, I want to be certain that you know what you are doing and you did know that when you entered a plea of guilty the other day. Do you want to let that plea of guilty stand, or do you want to withdraw it and plead not guilty?

Defendant Brady: I want to let that plea stand, sir

The Court: You understand that, in doing that, you are admitting and confessing the truth of the charge contained in the indictment and that you enter a plea of guilty voluntarily, without persuasion, coercion of any kind? Is that right?

Defendant Brady: Yes, your Honor.

The Court: And you do do that?

Defendant Brady: Yes, I do.

The Court: You plead guilty to the charge?

Defendant Brady: Yes, I do.

Upon his acceptance of his plea the trial judge imposed sentence of fifty years imprisonment, later reduced to thirty.

=== Appeal ===
In 1967 Brady sought post-conviction relief arguing that 18 U.S.C. § 1201(a) was coercive in nature and impermissible under United States v. Jackson which was decided after his conviction. In United States v. Jackson, the court ruled that 18 U.S.C. § 1201(a) was unconstitutional because the death sentence could only be imposed by a jury. The court concluded that the statute made death the risk of a jury trial and that this was impermissible. Brady argued that every guilty plea entered under § 1201 was invalid when the fear of death is shown to have been a factor. The District Court for the District of New Mexico denied relief. The District Court concluded that Brady changed his plea to guilty after learning that his codefendant would plead guilty, not due to the threat of death under § 1201. The Appeals Court for the Tenth Circuit agreed with the District Court and denied relief.

== Opinion of the Court ==
Justice White delivered the unanimous opinion of the court. He quotes from United States v. Jackson "the fact that the Federal Kidnapping Act tends to discourage defendants from insisting upon their innocence and demanding a jury trial by jury hardly implies that every defendant who enters a guilty plea to a charge under the Act does so involuntarily." By ruling that all guilty pleas entered under § 1201 "would rob the criminal process of much of its flexibility." The court ruled that Brady was not coerced by § 1201. He entered his guilty plea with full knowledge and willingness; it was not the court's fault that the defendant did not anticipate United States v. Jackson.

== See also ==
- Federal Kidnapping Act
- United States v. Jackson
