= Prosecutor =

Legal profession

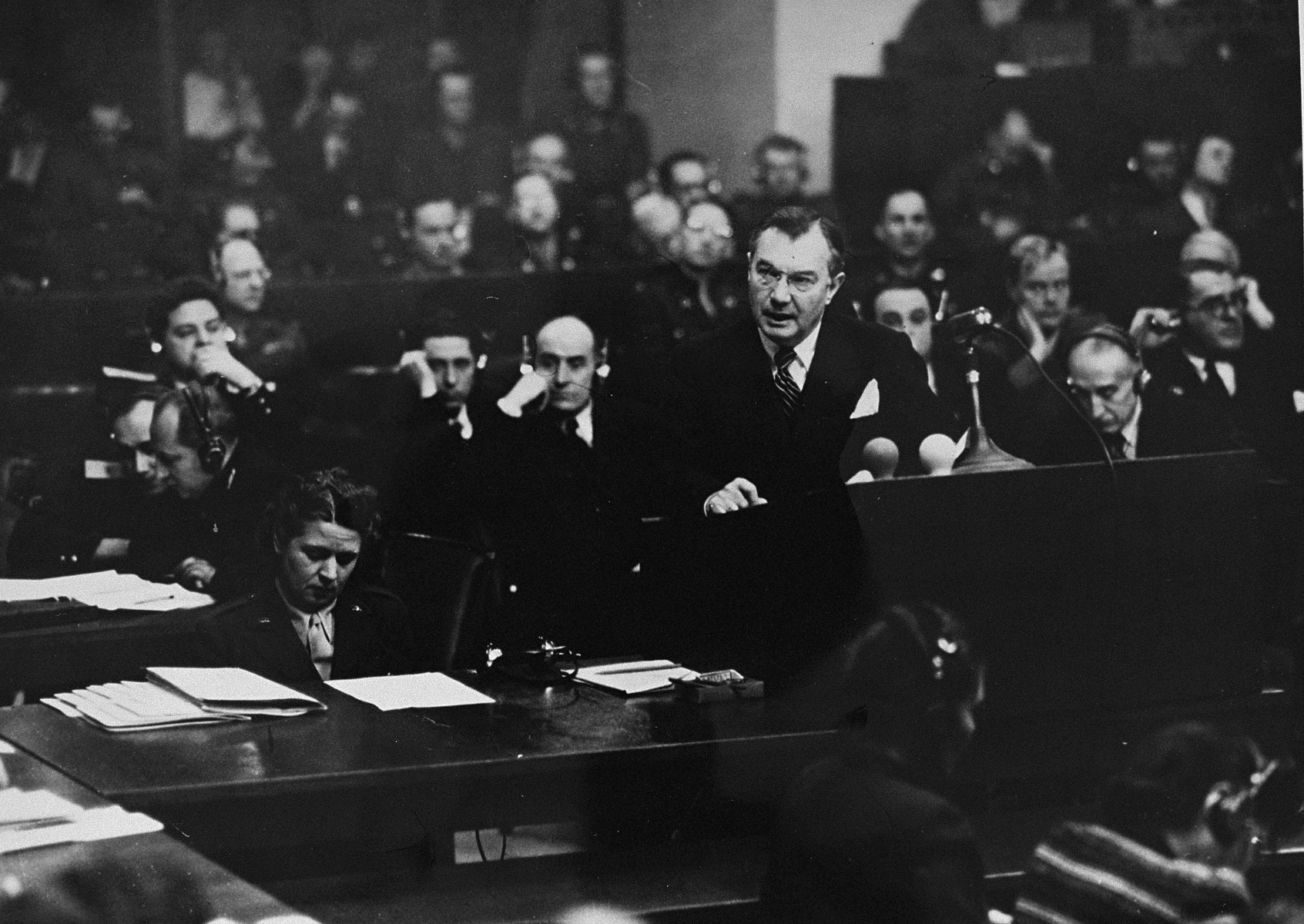
- Chief Prosecutor Robert H. Jackson (on the pulpit) at the Nuremberg Trials

Occupation
- Occupation type: Profession
- Activity sectors: Law, law enforcement

Description
- Competencies: Advocacy skills, analytical mind, sense of justice
- Education required: Typically required to be authorised to practice law in the jurisdiction, a law degree, in some cases a traineeship.
- Fields of employment: Government legal service
- Related jobs: Barrister, solicitor, advocate, judge, magistrate

A prosecutor is a legal representative of the prosecution in states with either the adversarial system, which is adopted in common law, or inquisitorial system, which is adopted in civil law. The prosecution is the legal party responsible for presenting the case in a criminal trial against the defendant, an individual accused of breaking the law. Typically, the prosecutor represents the state or the government in the case brought against the accused person.

== Prosecutor as a legal professional ==
Prosecutors are typically lawyers who possess a law degree and are recognised as suitable legal professionals by the court in which they are acting. This may mean they have been admitted to the bar or obtained a comparable qualification where available, such as solicitor advocates in England law. They become involved in a criminal case once a suspect has been identified and charges need to be filed. They are employed by an office of the government, with safeguards in place to ensure such an office can successfully pursue the prosecution of government officials. Multiple offices exist in a single country, especially in those countries with federal governments where sovereignty has been bifurcated or devolved in some way.

Since the power of the state backs prosecutors, they are subject to special professional responsibility rules in addition to those binding all lawyers. For example, in the United States, Rule 3.8 of the ABA Model Rules of Professional Conduct requires prosecutors to "make timely disclosure to the defense of all evidence or information that tends to negate the guilt of the accused or mitigates the offense." Not all U.S. states adopt the model rules; however, U.S. Supreme Court cases and other appellate cases have ruled that such disclosure is required. Typical sources of ethical requirements imposed on prosecutors come from appellate court opinions, state or federal court rules, and state or federal statutes (codified laws).

=== Directors of public prosecutions ===
In most Commonwealth Nations, the head of the prosecuting authority is known as the director of public prosecutions (DPP) and is appointed, not elected. A DPP may be subject to varying degrees of control by the attorney general, a formal written directive which must be published.

In Australia, the Offices of the Director of Public Prosecutions institute prosecutions for indictable offences on behalf of the Crown. At least in the case of very serious matters, the DPP will be asked by the police, during the investigation, to advise them on the sufficiency of evidence and may well be asked to prepare an application to the relevant court for search, listening device or telecommunications interception warrants.

More recent constitutions, such as South Africa's, guarantee the independence and impartiality of the DPP.

== Common law jurisdictions ==
=== Australia ===
Prosecutors in Australia come in a few distinct species. Prosecutors of criminal cases in lower courts are sometimes police officers with a traineeship in prosecution and advocacy; admitted lawyers may also be appointed. Crown Prosecutors are always lawyers and typically barristers, and they represent the state or Commonwealth in criminal proceedings in higher courts, such as the County or District Courts, or Supreme Court. Aside from police prosecutors and Crown prosecutors, government agencies have the authority to appoint non-lawyers to prosecute on their behalf, such as RSPCA Inspectors.

=== Canada ===
In Canada, public prosecutors in most provinces are called Crown Attorney or Crown Counsel. They are generally appointed by the provincial Attorney General.

=== England and Wales ===
The prosecution landscape in England and Wales is highly varied, meaning that a prosecutor can refer to a number of different individuals and roles.

==== Types of prosecutor ====
The primary prosecutor in the jurisdiction is the Crown Prosecution Service (CPS), which is led by the Director of Public Prosecutions (DPP). The CPS prosecutes on behalf of the Crown and also takes forward prosecutions originating from police investigations. While the DPP must be a suitably qualified lawyer under section 71 of the Courts and Legal Services Act 1990, the DPP does not take on cases themselves and instead plays an administrative and leadership role. In this way, while the DPP may be referred to as a prosecutor, the individual in the role would not take any cases to court. The DPP is appointed by His Majesty's Attorney General for England and Wales, and the Attorney General also has supervisory authority as the sponsor of the CPS; however, the CPS is an independent body and the Attorney General cannot direct particular prosecutions. Unlike in the United States and other jurisdictions, the Attorney General is not a prosecutor in England and Wales. Instead, the role is a political office of the chief legal advisor to the executive.

Crown Prosecutors are lawyers who work for the CPS. They are responsible for researching, advising police investigations, preparing cases for trial and sometimes presenting the case at trial. These lawyers may also be referred to as prosecutors. A number of other bodies have authority to bring prosecutions in England and Wales, including the Serious Fraud Office (SFO), Service Prosecuting Authority (SPA), and Financial Conduct Authority (FCA). These organisations and their legal representatives may be called prosecutors. This is the same for any person, organisation, or their representatives during a private prosecution. Finally, when cases are brought to trial, a barrister or solicitor with higher rights of audience may present the case before a magistrate or a judge (with or without a jury). In these instances, referring to the prosecutor would refer to the lawyer conducting the case during trial. In most serious offences, the CPS or other prosecuting authority will instruct a barrister to represent them. In the most serious cases, this may be a King's Counsel, and barristers may work in teams with a leader directing juniors. Unlike in the United States, these prosecuting barristers will work on a case-by-case basis, and so may also engage in defence work; they will not be employed solely to undertake prosecution advocacy.

==== Approach of the CPS to prosecutions ====
Crown Prosecutors are bound by a strict code of conduct, known as the Code for Crown Prosecutors, which governs how cases are charged and trials conducted. This fundamental code is supported by a range of other policies, most notably the Director's Guidance on Charging. The first stage in prosecuting a case is deciding to charge the suspect, and it is this process which begins the prosecution. The CPS has the authority to decide whether a person is charged in all offences. However, the police may charge all summary offences, and either-way offences when there is an anticipated guilty plea. The nature of the offence is suitable for sentence in the magistrates' court.

In order to charge, the circumstances must meet the Full Code Test. In some urgent cases, a lower Threshold Test can be applied to get a charge quickly; however, the Full Code Test must then be applied at the earliest opportunity. The Full Code Test has two stages; both parts are equal and must be met before a prosecution can be brought.

Evidential stage
Prosecutors must be satisfied that there is sufficient evidence to provide a realistic prospect of conviction against each suspect on each charge. They must consider what the defence case may be, and how it is likely to affect the prospects of conviction. A case which does not pass the evidential stage must not proceed, no matter how serious or sensitive it may be.
The finding that there is a realistic prospect of conviction is based on the prosecutor's objective assessment of the evidence, including the impact of any defence and any other information that the suspect has put forward or on which they might rely. It means that an objective, impartial, and reasonable jury or bench of magistrates or judge hearing a case alone, properly directed and acting in accordance with the law, is more likely than not to convict the defendant of the charge alleged. This is a different test from the one that the criminal courts themselves must apply. A court may only convict if it is sure that the defendant is guilty.
Public Interest stage
In every case where there is sufficient evidence to justify a prosecution or to offer an out-of-court disposal, prosecutors must go on to consider whether a prosecution is required in the public interest.
It has never been the rule that a prosecution will automatically take place once the evidential stage is met. A prosecution will usually take place unless the prosecutor is satisfied that there are public interest factors tending against prosecution which outweigh those tending in favour. In some cases the prosecutor may be satisfied that the public interest can be properly served by offering the offender the opportunity to have the matter dealt with by an out-of-court disposal rather than bringing a prosecution.

===== Thresholds =====
The Threshold Test must be kept under proactive and continuous review, and should only be used in rare and urgent circumstances.

There are reasonable grounds to suspect that the person to be charged has committed the offence
Prosecutors must be satisfied, on an objective assessment of the evidence, that there are reasonable grounds to suspect that the person to be charged has committed the offence. The assessment must consider the impact of any defence or information that the suspect has put forward or on which they might rely. In determining whether there are reasonable grounds to suspect, prosecutors must consider all of the material or information available, whether in evidential format or otherwise. Prosecutors must be satisfied that the material to be relied on at this stage is capable of being:
1. put into an admissible format for presentation in court;
2. reliable; and
3. credible.
Further evidence can be obtained to provide a realistic prospect of conviction
Prosecutors must be satisfied that there are reasonable grounds to believe that the continuing investigation will provide further evidence, within a reasonable period of time, so that when all the evidence is considered together, including material which may point away from as well as towards a particular suspect, it is capable of establishing a realistic prospect of conviction in accordance with the Full Code Test.
The seriousness or the circumstances of the case justifies the making of an immediate charging decision
The seriousness and the circumstances of the case should be assessed in relation to the alleged offending and should be linked to the level of risk created by granting bail.
There are continuing substantial grounds to object to bail in accordance with the Bail Act 1976 and in all the circumstances of the case it is proper to do so
This determination must be based on a proper risk assessment, which reveals that the suspect is not suitable to be bailed, even with substantial conditions. For example, a dangerous suspect who poses a serious risk of harm to a particular person or the public, or a suspect who poses a serious risk of absconding or interfering with witnesses. Prosecutors should not accept, without careful enquiry, any unjustified or unsupported assertions about risk if release on bail were to take place.
It is in the public interest to charge the suspect
Prosecutors must apply the public interest stage of the Full Code Test based on the information available at that time.

==== Prosecutions by other government agencies ====
State investigative agencies such as the Serious Fraud Office (SFO) and the Financial Conduct Authority (FCA), alongside independent prosecutors like the Service Prosecuting Authority, may all bring prosecutions themselves without using the CPS. Nevertheless, these prosecutors will follow the standards set by the Code of Crown Prosecutors alongside their own prosecution policies, which may deal with issues specific to the types of crime they engage with. There may, at times, be confusion as to which agency is responsible for having brought a prosecution. Which agency is prosecuting may affect whether an offence can be properly tried, as not all agencies can investigate and prosecute all offences. In R v Stafford Justices ex parte Customs and Excise Commissioners (1991) 2 All ER 201, it was found by the court that a prosecution is instituted by the police only when they have investigated, arrested and brought the arrested person to the custody officer. A case is not instituted by the police simply because a custody officer at a police station charges the suspect. Applying the same principle, proceedings are instituted by another prosecuting agency when they have been solely responsible for the investigation and arrest of the suspect, even though the suspect is taken to the police station to be charged by a custody officer.

The CPS advise that another prosecuting authority should probably conduct a case if any of the following factors apply:

- the police did not conduct the majority of the investigation;
- the police were only involved in overseeing a search, effecting an arrest or assisting other investigators in the conduct of an interview;
- the other authority is in possession of all the main exhibits; and
- someone other than a police officer is named on the charge sheet as the person accepting the charge or as the officer in the case.

==== Prosecutions requiring special consent ====
Prosecutions under certain acts require the consent of the Attorney General or DPP before they can proceed. In practice, the following types of consent may be required:

Consent type	Details
Attorney General's consent	Offences stipulating Attorney General's consent require the explicit consent of either the Attorney or Solicitor General. These roles together are known as the Law Officers. Under section 1 of the Law Officers Act 1997, the Solicitor General can undertake any role assigned to the Attorney General.
DPP's consent	Where an offence requires the consent of the DPP to proceed, this consent may be granted by a Crown Prosecutor under section 1(7) of the Prosecution of Offences Act 1985. The prosecutor should apply all the normal tests before granting consent.
DPP's personal consent	Where an offence requires the personal consent of the DPP, this must be sought from the serving DPP by prosecutors, though the exact process varies depending on the offence.
Inchoate offences	Where an inchoate offence is based on an underlying offence which requires consent to prosecute, the inchoate offence will also need consent.

The range of offences which require consent is wide, a list of the offences can be found at Annex 1 of Consents to Prosecute.

==== Private prosecutions ====
In England and Wales, there is a statutorily protected common law right for any person to institute a private prosecution. This right is retained by section 6(1) Prosecution of Offenders Act 1985. Some organisations regularly use private prosecutions on a large scale to achieve an institutional goal, for example the vast majority of prosecutions under the Animal Welfare Act 2006 are prosecuted by the Royal Society for the Prevention of Cruelty to Animals (RSPCA) as private prosecutions. The Post Office also undertook a wide array of private prosecutions against post masters, leading to a subsequent scandal in which these prosecutions have widely come to be seen as a miscarriage of justice. The RSPCA have come under strong criticism for lacking sufficient independence to act as a prosecutor from the independent 'Wooler' review; the Environmental, Food and Rural Affairs Committee and the Justice Select Committee, given they also investigate the offences and campaign politically for animal rights. The ongoing issues with private prosecutions outlined above has led to the Justice Select Committee calling for a closer examination of the process and regulation by government.

It is usually practically difficult for an individual to bring a private prosecution given the high cost – estimated by the Ministry of Justice at £8,500 on average. Even if a private prosecutor is not legally qualified, they must meet the usual legal requirements lawyers must undertake including the Criminal Procedure Rules and appropriate disclosure standards.

==== DPP's power to take over private prosecutions ====
The DPP has authority to take over any prosecution instituted by another person or organisation, and to discontinue the prosecution if they see fit. The CPS have set out public guidance on when they will take over a prosecution; this indicates that the CPS should take over and continue with the prosecution if the papers clearly show all of the following:

- the evidential sufficiency stage of the Full Code Test is met;
- the public interest stage of the Full Code Test is met; and
- there is a particular need for the CPS to take over the prosecution.

The final consideration is designed to cover the situation where, for whatever reason, the investigative authorities with which the CPS usually deals have not brought the case to the CPS' attention and yet it is a case that merits the prosecution being conducted by a public prosecuting authority rather than by a private individual.

=== New Zealand ===
In New Zealand, most crimes are prosecuted by a Police Prosecutor, an employee of the New Zealand Police. The most serious crimes, which are about 5% of all crimes, is outsourced to a lawyer working at private law firm known as a Crown prosecutor.

=== Scotland ===
Although Scots law is a mixed system, its civil law jurisdiction indicates its civil law heritage. Here, all prosecutions are carried out by Procurators Fiscal and Advocates Depute on behalf of the Lord Advocate, and, in theory, they can direct investigations by Police Scotland. In very serious cases, a Procurator Fiscal, Advocate Depute, or even the Lord Advocate may take charge of a police investigation. It is at the discretion of the Procurator Fiscal, Advocate Depute, or Lord Advocate to take a prosecution to court, and to decide on whether to prosecute it under solemn procedure or summary procedure. Other remedies are open to a prosecutor in Scotland, including fiscal fines and non-court based interventions, such as rehabilitation and social work. All prosecutions are handled within the Crown Office and Procurator Fiscal Service. Procurators fiscal will usually refer cases involving minors to Children's Hearings, which are not courts of law, but a panel of lay members empowered to act in the interests of the child.

=== United States ===
The United States is the only country in the world where citizens elect prosecutors. The director of a prosecution office is known by any of several names depending on the jurisdiction, most commonly district attorney. Other names include state's attorney, state attorney, county attorney, and commonwealth's attorney. The prosecution is the legal party responsible for presenting the case against an individual or a corporation suspected of breaking the law, initiating and directing further criminal investigations, guiding and recommending the sentencing of offenders, and are the only attorneys allowed to participate in grand jury proceedings.

The titles of prosecutors in state courts vary from state to state and level of government (i.e. city, county, and state) and include the terms District Attorney in New York, California, Texas, Pennsylvania, Delaware, Massachusetts, North Carolina, Georgia, Nevada, Wisconsin, Oregon, and Oklahoma; City Attorney in California cities (typically prosecute only minor and misdemeanor offenses) Commonwealth's Attorney in Kentucky and Virginia; County Attorney in Nebraska, Minnesota, and Arizona; County Prosecutor in New Jersey, Ohio, and Indiana; District Attorney General in Tennessee; Prosecuting Attorney in Arkansas, Hawaii, Idaho, Michigan, Washington, and West Virginia, as well as in Missouri where cities additionally use City Attorneys to prosecute on their behalf; State's Attorney in Connecticut, Florida, Illinois, Maryland, North Dakota, and Vermont; State Prosecutor; Attorney General in Delaware and Rhode Island; and Solicitor in South Carolina.

Prosecutors are most often chosen through local elections, and typically hire other attorneys as deputies or assistants to conduct most of the actual work of the office. United States Attorneys are appointed by the President and confirmed by the United States Senate. They represent the federal government in federal court in both civil and criminal cases. Private attorneys general can bring criminal cases on behalf of private parties in some states. Prosecutors are required by state and federal laws to follow certain rules. For example, the government must disclose exculpatory evidence to the defense; must disclose matters affecting the credibility of prosecution witnesses, such as an agreement to dismiss the witness's own charges in exchange for their testimony; must not destroy potentially useful evidence in bad faith; and must not use false testimony to secure a conviction. Failure to follow these rules may result in a finding of prosecutorial misconduct, although a 2013 investigation found that actual discipline for prosecutorial misconduct was lacking.

Prosecutors are also tasked with seeking justice in their prosecutions. "The United States Attorney," explained the U.S. Supreme Court,

is the representative not of an ordinary party to a controversy, but of a sovereignty whose obligation to govern impartially is as compelling as its obligation to govern at all, and whose interest, therefore, in a criminal prosecution is not that it shall win a case, but that justice shall be done. As such, he is in a peculiar and very definite sense the servant of the law, the two-fold aim of which is that guilt shall not escape or innocence suffer. He may prosecute with earnestness and vigor—indeed, he should do so. But, while he may strike hard blows, he is not at liberty to strike foul ones. It is as much his duty to refrain from improper methods calculated to produce a wrongful conviction as it is to use every legitimate means to bring about a just one.

In Kentucky, Massachusetts, Pennsylvania, and Virginia, criminal prosecutions are brought in the name of the Commonwealth. In California, Colorado, Illinois, Michigan, and New York, criminal prosecutions are brought in the name of the People. In the remaining states, criminal prosecutions are brought in the name of the State.

Prosecutors have broad discretion to decide whether to bring charges after an arrest, regardless of the strength of the evidence, and they decide what and how many charges to bring. Those decisions are "virtually unreviewable" by the courts. Prosecutors can also choose to dismiss criminal charges at any point by seeking a voluntary dismissal or nolle prosequi. They often bring additional charges that they know they cannot prove, to give them more leverage during the plea bargaining process and more charges to drop in exchange for guilty pleas. They also frequently promise to drop charges if defendants complete pretrial diversion programs, which typically require defendants to attend appointments, submit to drug testing, and pay fees over a period of months or years.

== Civil law jurisdictions ==
Prosecutors are typically civil servants who possess a university degree in law and additional training in the administration of justice. In some countries, such as France and Italy, they are classed as judges.

=== Belgium ===
In Belgium, the Senior Crown prosecutor (Procureur du Roi/Procureur des Konings in trial courts and Procureur Général/Procureur-Generaal in appellate courts) is supported by subordinate Crown prosecutors (substituts/substituten). They open preliminary investigations and can hold a suspect in custody for up to 48 hours. When necessary, a Crown prosecutor will request an examining judge (juge d'instruction/onderzoeksrechter) be appointed to lead a judicial inquest. With a judge investigating, Crown prosecutors do not conduct the interrogatories, but simply lay out the scope of the crimes which the judge and law enforcement forces investigate (la saisine). Like defense counsel, Crown prosecutors can request or suggest further investigation be carried out. The Crown prosecutor is in charge of policy decisions and may prioritize cases and procedures as need be.

During a criminal trial, prosecutors must introduce and explain the case to the trier of fact, i.e., judges or jury. They generally suggest a reasonable sentence which the court is not obligated to follow; the court may decide on a tougher or softer sentence. Crown prosecutors also have a number of administrative duties. They may advise the court during civil actions. Under Belgian law, judges and prosecutors are judicial officers with equal rank and pay. The Minister of Justice can order a criminal investigation but cannot prevent one (droit d'injonction positive/positief injunctierecht).

=== Brazil ===
In Brazil, the public prosecutors form a body of autonomous civil servants—the Public Ministry (Ministério Público)—working both at the federal and state level. Members of the Federal Prosecution Service are divided in three ranks, according to the jurisdiction of the courts before which they officiate. Federal Prosecutors (Procuradores da República) officiate before single judges and lower courts, Federal Circuit Prosecutors (procuradores regionais da República) before federal appellate courts, and Associate Federal Prosecutors General (subprocuradores gerais da República) before superior federal courts. The Prosecutor General of the Republic (Procurador Geral da República) heads the federal body, and tries cases before the Brazilian Supreme Court.

At the state level, the career is usually divided in state prosecutors (promotores de Justiça) who practice before the lower courts and state appellate prosecutors (procuradores de Justiça) who practice before the state courts of appeals. There are also military prosecutors whose career, although linked to the federal prosecutors, is divided in a manner similar to state prosecutors. In Brazil, the prosecutors' main job is to promote justice, as such they have the duty of not only trying criminal cases, but, if during the trial, they become convinced of a defendant's innocence, requesting the judge to acquit him. The prosecutor's office has always the last word on whether criminal offenses will or will not be charged, with the exception of those rare cases in which Brazilian law allows for private prosecution. In such cases, the prosecutor will officiate as custos legis, being responsible to ensure that justice is indeed carried out. Although empowered by law to do so, prosecutors conduct criminal investigations only in major cases, usually involving police or public officials' wrongdoings. Also, they are in charge of external control over police activity and requesting the initiation of a police investigation.

The power of individual prosecutors to hold criminal investigations was controversial and, although massively supported by judges, prosecutors and the general population, it was contested before the Supremo Tribunal Federal, but in 2015, this Court decided favorably to its power (RGE n. 593.727-MG). According to a 2012 law, the chief of police (delegado de polícia), as the police authority, is responsible for conducting the criminal investigation in Brazil by means of a police investigation (inquérito policial) or other procedure provided by law that has the purpose of ascertaining the circumstances, materiality, and authorship of criminal offenses. Similar provisions are found in the Code of Criminal Procedure and in article 144 of the federal constitution. Beside their criminal duties, Brazilian prosecutors are among those authorized by the Brazilian constitution to bring action against private individuals, commercial enterprises, and the federal, state and municipal governments, in the defense of minorities, the environment, consumers, and the civil society in general.

=== France ===
In France, the Office of the Prosecutor includes a Chief Prosecutor (Procureur de la République in trial courts and procureur général in appellate courts or the Court of Cassation) and his deputies and assistants (avocats généraux and substituts). The Chief Prosecutor generally initiates preliminary investigations and, if necessary, asks that an examining judge (juge d'instruction) be assigned to lead a formal judicial investigation. When an investigation is led by a judge, the prosecutor plays a supervisory role, defining the scope of the crimes being examined by the judge and law enforcement forces. Like defense counsel, the chief prosecutor may petition or move for further investigation. During criminal proceedings, prosecutors are responsible for presenting the case at trial to either the bench or the jury. Prosecutors generally suggest advisory sentencing guidelines, but the sentence remains at the court's discretion to decide, to increase or reduce as it sees fit. In addition, prosecutors have several administrative duties.

Prosecutors are considered magistrates under French law, as in most civil law countries. While the defense and the plaintiff are both represented by common lawyers, who sit (on chairs) on the courtroom floor, the prosecutor sits on a platform as the judge does, although he does not participate in deliberation. Judges and prosecutors are trained at the same school, and regard one other as colleagues.

=== Germany ===
In Germany, the Staatsanwalt ("state attorney") is a life-tenured public official in the senior judicial service belonging to the same corps as judges. The Staatsanwalt heads pre-trial criminal investigations, decides whether to press a charge or drop it, and represents the government in criminal courts. The Staatsanwalt not only has the "professional responsibility" not to withhold exculpatory information, but is also required by law to actively determine such circumstances and to make them available to the defendant or the defense attorney. If the Staatsanwalt is not convinced of the defendant's guilt, the state attorney is required to plead against or in favor of the defendant according to the prosecutor's own assessment. Prosecution is compulsory if the prosecutor has sufficient evidence to convict.

=== Italy ===
In Italy, a Prosecutor's Office is composed of a Chief Prosecutor (procuratore capo) assisted by deputies (procuratori aggiunti) and assistants (sostituti procuratori). Prosecutors in Italy are judicial officers just like judges and are ceremonially referred to as Pubblico Ministero ("Public Ministry" or P.M.). Italian Prosecutors officiate as custos legis, being responsible to ensure that justice is indeed carried out. They are obligated under the Constitution to initiate preliminary investigations once they are informed or take personal notice of a criminal act—notitia criminis—or receive a bill of complaint. They can direct investigations or conduct them through orders and directives given to (judicial) police detectives, who can make their own parallel investigations in coordination with the Prosecutor. If enough evidence has been gathered in order to proceed, the prosecution is compulsory and it must move from preliminary investigations to initiate trial proceedings. At trial, the prosecuting attorney has to handle the prosecution but has an overarching duty to promote justice. In practice, this duty means that prosecutors are prohibited from withholding exculpatory evidence and must request that the judge acquit the defendant if, during the trial, the prosecutor becomes convinced of the defendant's innocence, or agrees that there is no evidence that proves his guilt beyond any reasonable doubt.

In appellate courts, the Office of the Prosecutor is called Procura Generale and the Chief Prosecutor the Procuratore Generale (PG). The Procuratore Generale presso la Corte di Cassazione is the Chief General Prosecutor before the Corte di Cassazione, the Supreme Court of Italy. Prosecutors are allowed during their career to act in the other's stead, although a ruling by the Constitutional Court of Italy stated that prosecutors who wish to become judges must relocate to another region and are prohibited to sit or hear trials that they themselves initiated.

=== Japan ===
In Japan, Public Prosecutors (検察官, kensatsu-kan) are professional officials who have considerable powers of investigation, prosecution, superintendence of criminal execution and so on. Prosecutors can direct police for investigation purposes, and sometimes investigate directly. Only prosecutors can prosecute criminals in principle, and prosecutors can decide whether to prosecute. High-ranking officials of the Ministry of Justice are largely prosecutors.

=== Poland ===
The highest-ranking prosecutor office of the Prokuratura in Poland is the Prokurator Generalny (General Prosecutor), who is the chief of the Prokuratura Krajowa (National Public Prosecutor's Office). The GP has 5 deputies. The structure of Public Prosecution in Poland is four-level: Prokuratura Krajowa — National Public Prosecutor's Office; prokuratury regionalne — provincial public prosecutor's offices (11); prokuratury okręgowe — regional public prosecutor's offices (45); and prokuratury rejonowe — district public prosecutor's offices (358). Apart from a brief period between 2010 and 2016, the position of Public Prosecutor General has been held concurrently by the Minister of Justice.

=== South Korea ===
Prosecutors are public officials who are members of the Prosecutor's Office. Prosecutors can conduct crime investigations directly or indirectly. They are responsible for the entire process of investigations and court prosecutions. Since Korean modern law was modeled after civil law, the role of Korean prosecutors is similar or identical to that of European equivalents in leading investigations, determining indictable cases, and prosecuting. Due to the recent turn of events including the unconstitutional martial law declaration of 3 December 2024, followed by a sequence of political chaos and societal debacle involving the former Prosecutor General and 20th President of South Korea, Yoon Suk-yeol, the public has collectively expressed outrage at the politicized prosecutors who were accused of active involvement in devastating Yoon's political opponents and cracking down on the public sentiment through the lens of outdated Cold War political worldview, painting them as pro-DPRK sympathizers. After the impeachment of Yoon Suk-yeol followed by a snap election on 3 June 2025 (KST), the newly elected 21st President Lee Jae-myung and his government proceeds to significantly reform the current prosecution authority weld by both main and supreme prosecutors through a due process led on by the Minister of Justice Department soon to be elected after the congressional hearing and the Chief of Civil Affairs duly appointed by the president, as the Constitution of the Republic of Korea mandates. A prosecutor has the power to prohibit a defendant or an accused individual from departing the Republic of Korea via an "international hold".

=== Spain ===
In Spain, the Prosecution Ministry (or Public Prosecutor’s Office) is the constitutional body entrusted with defending the rule of law, the rights of citizens, and the public interest protected by law, as well as ensuring the independence of the courts and seeking the satisfaction of the general interest before them. It is an autonomous part of the judiciary, although the executive branch exerts considerable influence, as it is the one that appoints the Prosecutor General of the State.

The Prosecution Ministry is composed of the Prosecutor General and their support and advisory bodies, and the other Public Prosecutor's Offices in the various courts of justice. The Prosecutor General heads both the Prosecutor General's Office and the Supreme Court Prosecutor's Office, although, in practice, the latter is headed by the Lieutenant Prosecutor of the Supreme Court.

Prosecutors in Spain are divided into three categories:

- Prosecutors of the Supreme Court (Spanish: Fiscales de Sala del Tribunal Supremo, lit. 'Chamber Prosecutors of the Supreme Court'), equivalent to Supreme Court Magistrates.
- Prosecutors (Spanish: Fiscales), equivalent to Magistrates.
- Junior Prosecutors (Spanish: Abogados Fiscales, lit. 'Lawyer-Prosecutors'), equivalent to Judges.

The Prosecutor General is not part of any category and is equated in honors to the President of the Supreme Court, while the Lieutenant Prosecutor of the Supreme Court, who must be a Supreme Court Prosecutor, is considered equivalent to a Chamber President of the Supreme Court (Spanish: Presidente de Sala del Tribunal Supremo).

The first prosecution category includes the heads of the prosecutor's offices and units dependent on the Prosecutor General's Office, the main prosecutors of the Supreme Court Prosecutor's Office, the heads of the prosecutor's offices before the Audiencia Nacional, before the Constitutional Court and before the Court of Auditors, and any other that may be established in the staff.

Below the national organization, each region has a Senior Prosecutor's Office, whose head belongs to the second category and exercises their functions before a High Court of Justice. The level immediately below is the provincial level, with a Prosecutor's Office before a Provincial Court, and at the lowest level are the Area Prosecutor's Offices, which serve in territorial units smaller than the province.

=== Sweden ===
In Sweden, public prosecutors are lawyers who work out of the Swedish Prosecution Authority (Swedish: Åklagarmyndigheten) and direct police investigations of serious crimes. For all criminal cases, public prosecutors decide arrests and charges on behalf of the public and are the only public officers who can make such decisions. Plaintiffs also have the option of hiring their own special prosecutor (enskilt åtal). The exception is cases concerning crimes against the freedom of the press for which the Chancellor of Justice acts as the prosecuting attorney. In court, the prosecutor is not necessarily in an adversarial relationship to the defendant, but is under an obligation to investigate and present information that may incriminate or exonerate the defendant. The prosecutor is not a judicial officer, nor do they participate in the private deliberations of the court. Public prosecutors are the only public officers who can decide to appeal cases to appellate courts. Otherwise, appeals are initiated by defense counsel, the plaintiff, their representatives, and other parties to the case (målsäganden). When a case has been decided by an appellate court, the right to appeal to the Supreme Court passes from the case's prosecutor to the Prosecutor-General (Swedish: Riksåklagaren).

== Socialist law jurisdictions ==
A Public Procurator is an office used in socialist law, which in some ways corresponds to that of a public prosecutor in other legal systems but with more far-reaching responsibilities, such as handling investigations otherwise performed by branches of the police. Conversely, the policing systems in socialist countries, such as the Militsiya of the Soviet Union, were not aimed at fulfilling the same roles as police forces in democratic countries.

=== People's Republic of China ===
A Public Procurator is a position in the People's Republic of China, analogous to both detective and public prosecutor. Legally, they are bound by Public Procurators' Law of the People's Republic of China. According to Article 6, the functions and duties of public procurators are as follows:

1. Supervise the enforcement of laws according to law.
2. Public prosecution on behalf of the State.
3. Investigate criminal cases directly accepted by the People's Procuratorates as provided by law.
4. Other functions and duties as provided by law.

=== Vietnam ===
The Supreme People's Procuracy is the highest office of public procurators in Vietnam.

== Independence and accountability ==
Political bias by prosecutors was found. In many countries, the prosecutor's administration is directly subordinate to the executive branch (e.g., the United States Attorney General is a member of the President's cabinet). In some other countries, such as Brazil or Italy, the prosecutors are judicial civil servants, so they have the same liberties and independence that judges traditionally enjoy. In other countries, a form of private prosecution is available, meaning persons or private entities can directly petition the courts to hold trial against someone they feel is guilty of a crime, should the prosecutor refuse to indict. Prosecutor independence and accountability to the people can reduce selective prosecution.

== Private prosecution ==
In the early history of England, victims of a crime and their family had the right to hire a private attorney to prosecute criminal charges against the person alleged to have injured the victim. In the 18th century, prosecution of almost all criminal offences in England was private, usually by the victim. In Colonial America, because of Dutch and possibly French practice and the expansion of the office of attorney general, public officials came to dominate the prosecution of crimes; however, privately funded prosecutors constituted a significant element of the state criminal justice system throughout the nineteenth century. The use of a private prosecutor was incorporated into the common law of Virginia but is no longer permitted there. Private prosecutors were also used in North Carolina as late as 1975. Private prosecution has been used in Nigeria, although the practice is being phased out.

== See also ==
- Public procurator
- Public prosecutor's office
- Magistrats Européens pour la Démocratie et les Libertés (European Association of Judges and Public Prosecutors)

== Bibliography ==
- Gad Barzilai. The Attorney General and the State Prosecutor: Is Institutional Separation Warranted? (Jerusalem: The Israel Democracy Institute, 2010). The Index of Arab-Jewish Relations in Israel 2012 (English).
- Hugo Nigro Mazzilli. Regime Juridico do Ministério Público, 5ª edição, São Paulo: Saraiva, 2001.
- Raoul Muhm, Gian Carlo Caselli (Hrsg.), Die Rolle des Staatsanwaltes Erfahrungen in Europa–Il ruolo del Pubblico Ministero Esperienze in Europa–Le role du Magistrat du Parquet Expériences en Europe The role of the Public Prosecutor Experiences in Europe, Vecchiarelli Editore Manziana (Roma) 2005. ISBN 88-8247-156-X
- Raoul Muhm, "The role of the Public Prosecutor in Germany" in The Irish Jurist, Volume XXXVIII, New Series 2003, The Law Faculty, University College, Dublin LARCHIVIO - Finance Journal.
- Erick Maurel, Paroles de procureur (Paris: Gallimard, 2008), ISBN 978-2-07-011977-6.
