= Social Hall (Alcatraz) =

Building in San Francisco, California, United States

Coordinates: 37°49′40″N 122°25′23″W

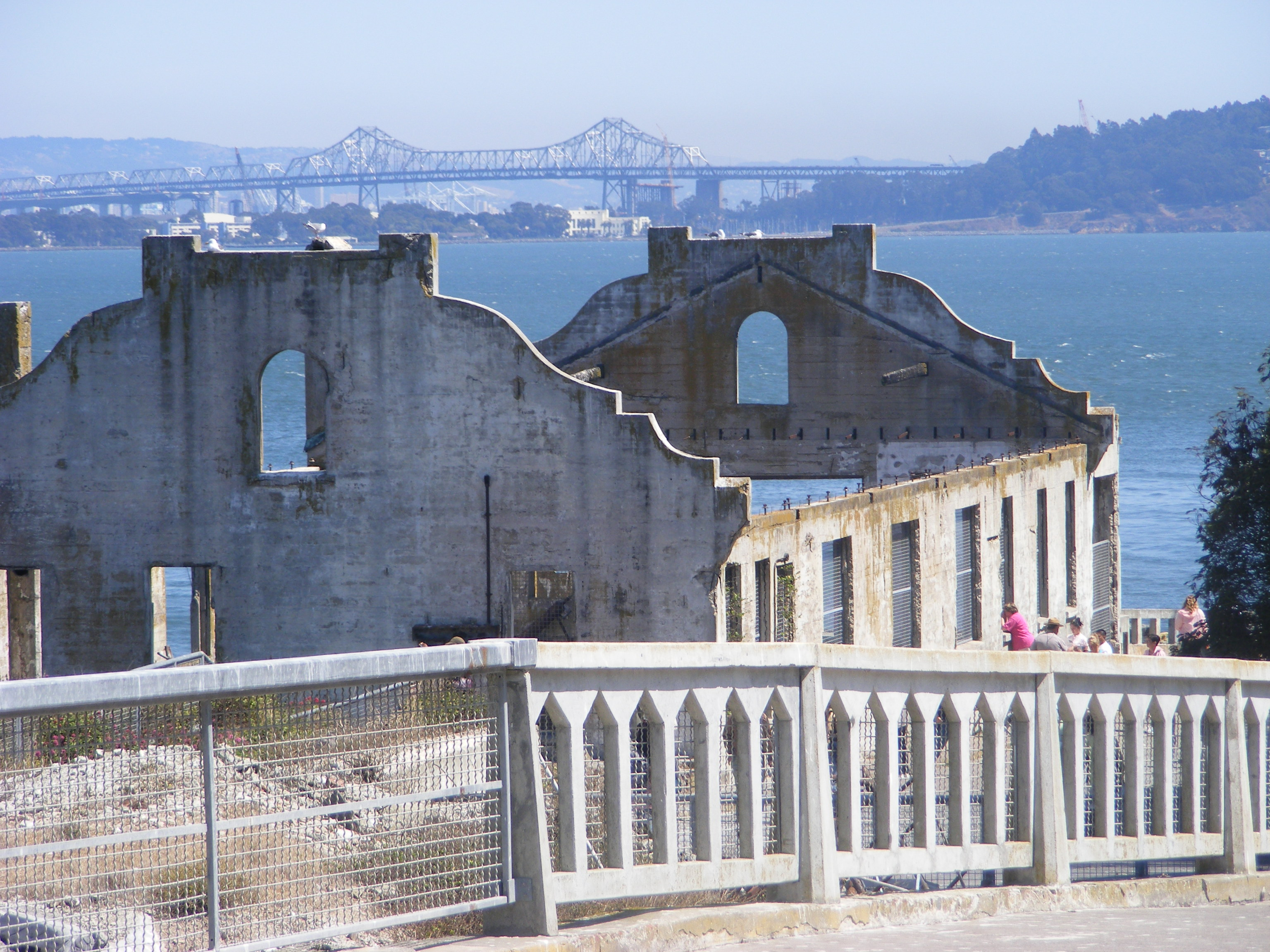
The ruined Social Hall of Alcatraz

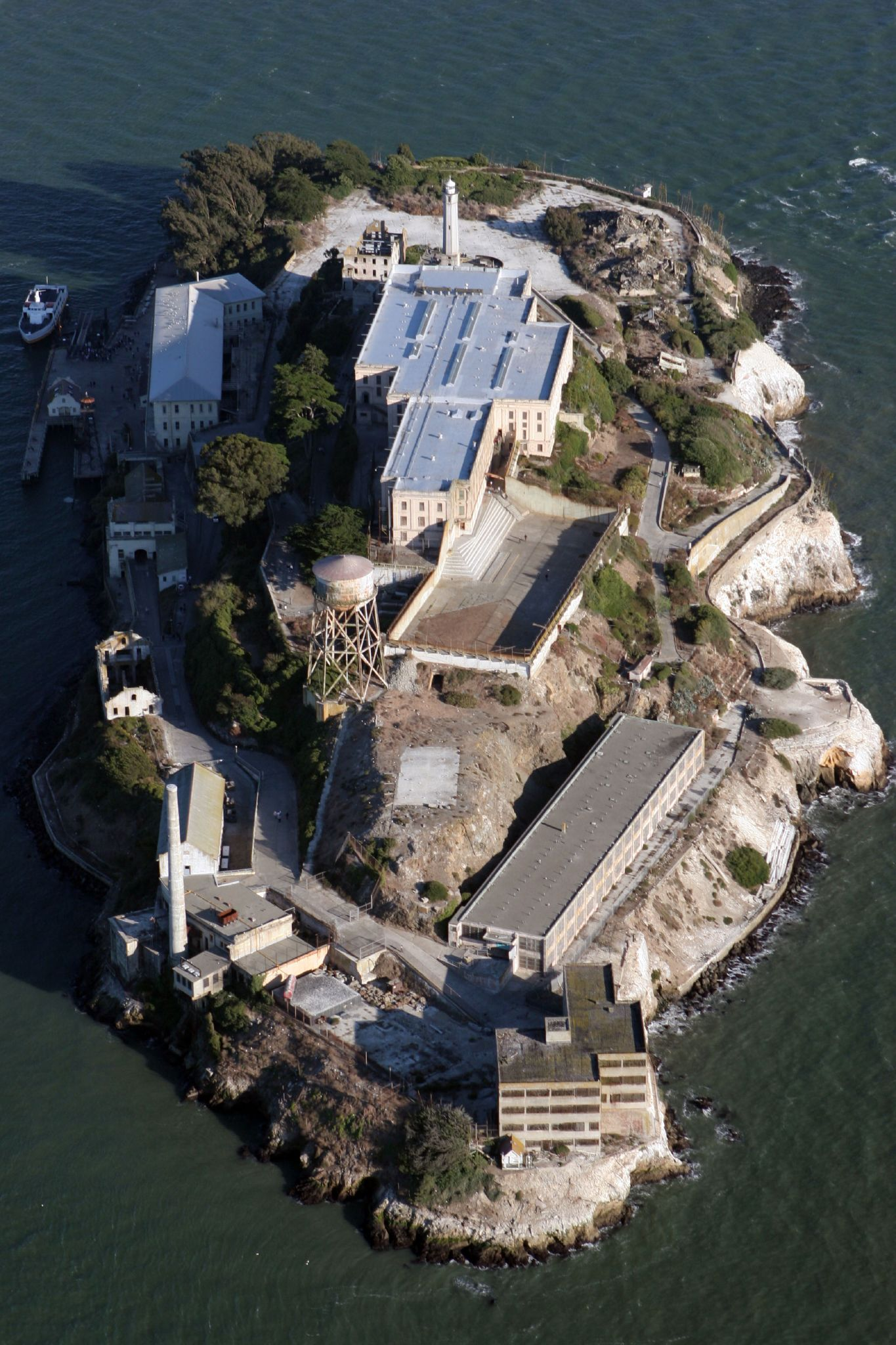
The Social Hall is located on the left of the picture, beyond the white tower

The Social Hall, also known as the Officers' Club, was a social club located on the northwestern side of the island of Alcatraz, off the coast of San Francisco, USA. Located in close proximity to the Power House, water tower and Former Military Chapel (Bachelor Quarters), it formerly housed the post exchange. The club was a social venue for the Federal Penitentiary workers and their families on the island to unwind after they'd been locked up at 17:30. It was burned down by a fire of disputed origins during the Occupation of Alcatraz in 1970; leaving a shell which still remains.

== Facilities and organization ==
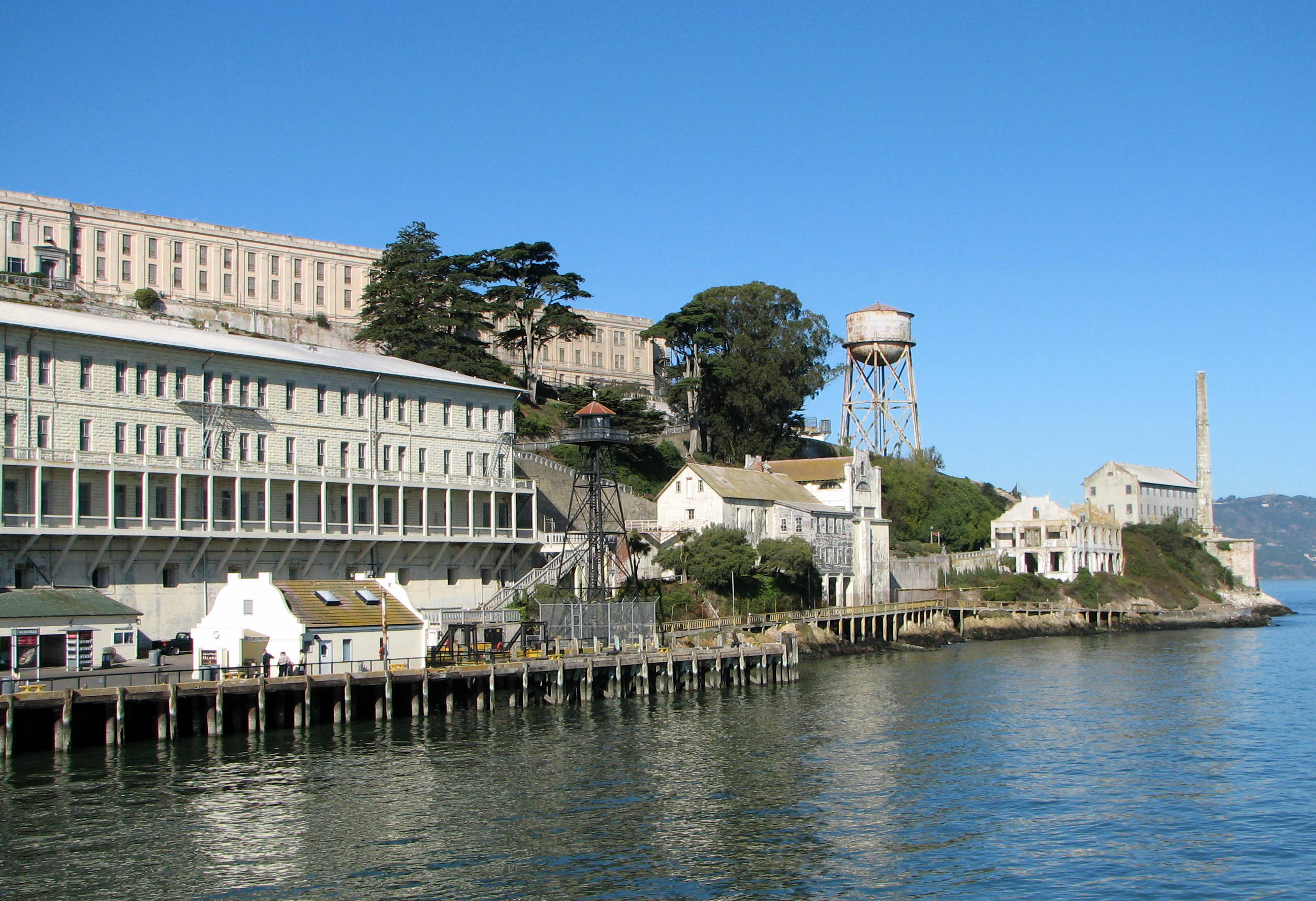
The Social Hall building can be seen between the water tower and the powerhouse on the right

The club had a small bar, library, large dining and dance floor, billiards table, ping pong table and a two-lane bowling alley, and was the center of social life on the island for the employees of the penitentiary. It regularly hosted dinners, bingo events, and from the 1940s onwards showed movies every Sunday night after they had been shown to the inmates during the day on Saturday and Sunday. The employees formed bowling leagues and held championships Food was supplied from leftovers in the kitchen and often brought by the attendees so it was usually free for the guests of the parties held here.

The club was responsible for organizing numerous special events on the island (held either in the hall or the Parade Grounds) and the fundraising associated with it, including ice cream and watermelon feasts, Halloween and Christmas parties.
