= Social Hall =

Social Hall may refer to:

- Social Hall (Alcatraz), a social club on Alcatraz Island, off the coast of San Francisco, California, USA
- Social Hall (Salt Lake City), a former theater and community center in Salt Lake City, Utah, USA

== See also ==
- Community centre
- Cultural center
- Village hall
