= Philip Grosser =

American anarchist

Philip Grosser (1890 – October 1933) was an American anarchist and anti-militarist, who was imprisoned in Alcatraz Federal Penitentiary for refusing to fight in World War I. Grosser is notable for writing one of the first exposés of Alcatraz Prison, the 32-page pamphlet Alcatraz – Uncle Sam's Devil's Island.

== Biography ==
Philip Grosser was born in 1890 in Slavuta, Ukraine.

He was imprisoned at the federal military prison on Alcatraz Island, having refused the draft during the First World War. By the end of 1920, two years after the war ended, he was the only remaining conscientious objector at Alcatraz, and in poor health. He wrote one of the first exposés of Alcatraz Prison, the 32-page pamphlet Alcatraz – Uncle Sam's Devil's Island, which told of his experience in the prison. It was republished in 2007.

Grosser was hailed by fellow anarchist Alexander Berkman as "one of [my] finest comrades".

He died by suicide in Boston, Massachusetts, in October 1933 and was buried on October 20, 1933.
