= Alcatraz Island =

Island in San Francisco Bay, California, US

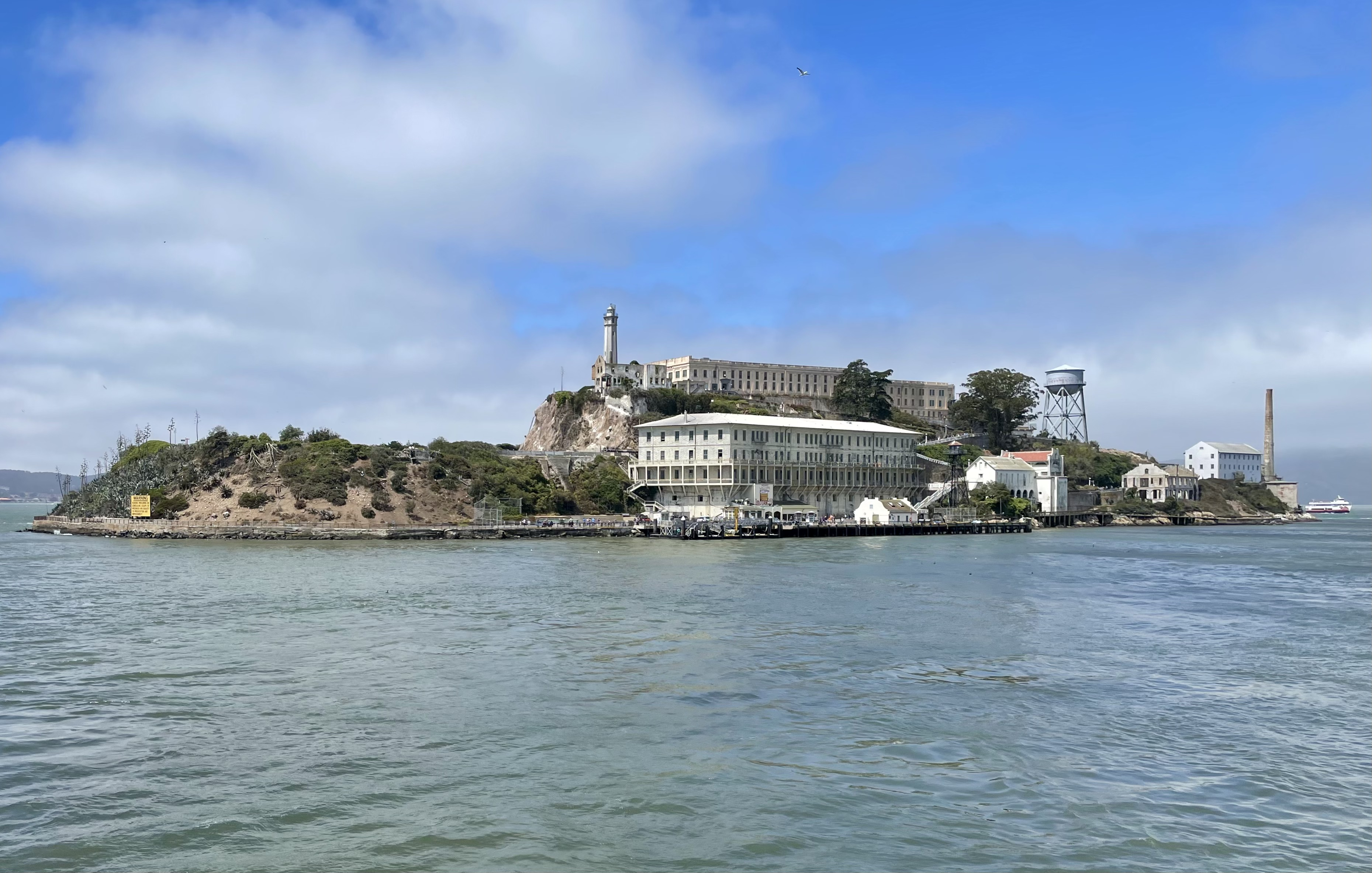
- Alcatraz Island in San Francisco Bay from the east

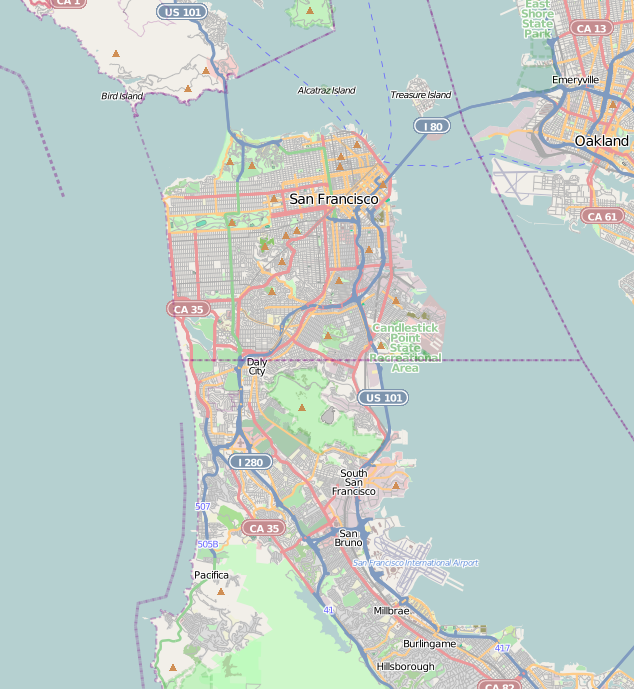
- Location within San Francisco Location within California Location within the United States
- Location: San Francisco Bay, California, U.S.
- Nearest city: San Francisco, California
- Coordinates: 37°49′36″N 122°25′22″W
- Area: 22 acres (8.9 ha)
- Established: 1934; 92 years ago
- Governing body: National Park Service
- Website: Alcatraz Island
- Alcatraz
- U.S. National Register of Historic Places
- U.S. National Historic Landmark District
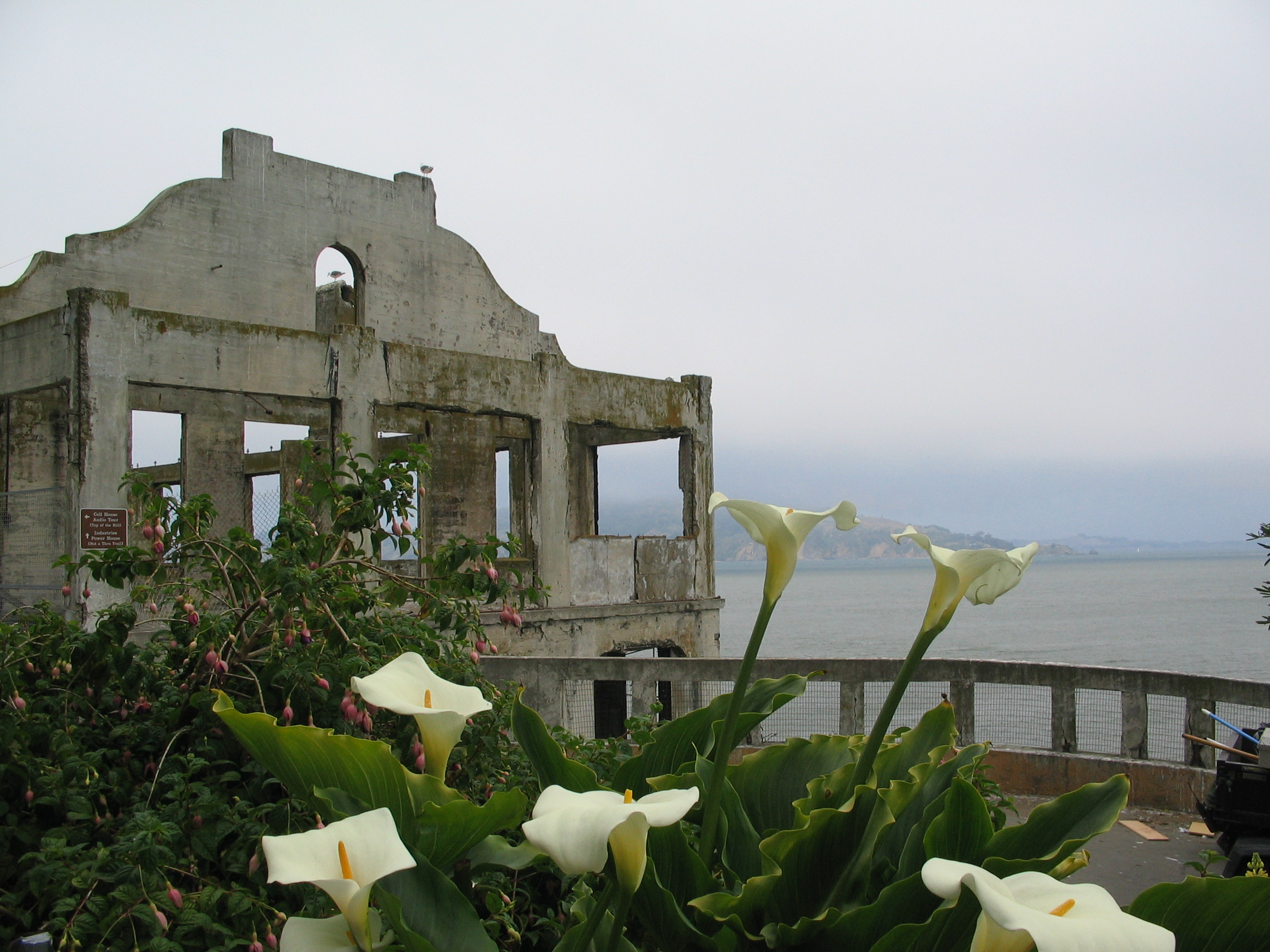
- The Social Hall, destroyed by fire during the Native American occupation
- Area: 47 acres (19 ha)
- Built: 1847
- Architects: U.S. Army, Bureau of Prisons; U.S. Army
- Architectural style: Mission/Spanish Revival
- NRHP reference No.: 76000209

Significant dates
- Added to NRHP: June 23, 1976
- Designated NHLD: January 17, 1986

Alcatraz Island (/ˈælkəˌtræz/) is a small island about 1.25 miles offshore from San Francisco in San Francisco Bay, California, near the Golden Gate strait. The island was developed in the mid-19th century with facilities for a lighthouse, a military fortification, and a military prison. In 1934, the island was converted into a federal prison, Alcatraz Federal Penitentiary. The strong tidal currents around the island and cold water temperatures made escape nearly impossible, giving the prison one of the most notorious reputations of its kind in American history. The prison closed on March 21, 1963, leaving the island a major tourist attraction today with nearly 1.4 million people visiting the island annually.

Alcatraz Island has the oldest operating lighthouse on the West Coast of the United States, early military fortifications, and natural features such as rock pools and a seabird colony (mostly western gulls, cormorants, and egrets). According to a 1971 documentary on the history of Alcatraz, the island measures 1,675 feet (511 m) by 590 feet (180 m) and is 135 feet (41 m) at highest point during mean tide. The total area of the island is reported to be 22 acres (8.9 ha).

Beginning in November 1969, the island was occupied for more than 19 months by a group of Native Americans, initially primarily from San Francisco, who were later joined by the American Indian Movement and other urban Native Americans from other parts of the country, who were part of a wave of Native American activists organizing public protests across the US through the 1970s.

In 1972, Alcatraz was transferred to the Department of Interior to become part of Golden Gate National Recreation Area. The island's facilities are managed by the National Park Service. It was designated as a National Historic Landmark in 1986. Hornblower Cruises, operating under the name Alcatraz City Cruises, is the official ferry provider at Pier 33, located between the San Francisco Ferry Building and Fisherman's Wharf.

Landmarks on the island include the Main Cellhouse, Dining Hall, Lighthouse, the ruins of the Warden's House and Social Hall, Parade Grounds, Building 64, Water Tower, New Industries Building, Model Industries Building, and the Recreation Yard.

== History ==
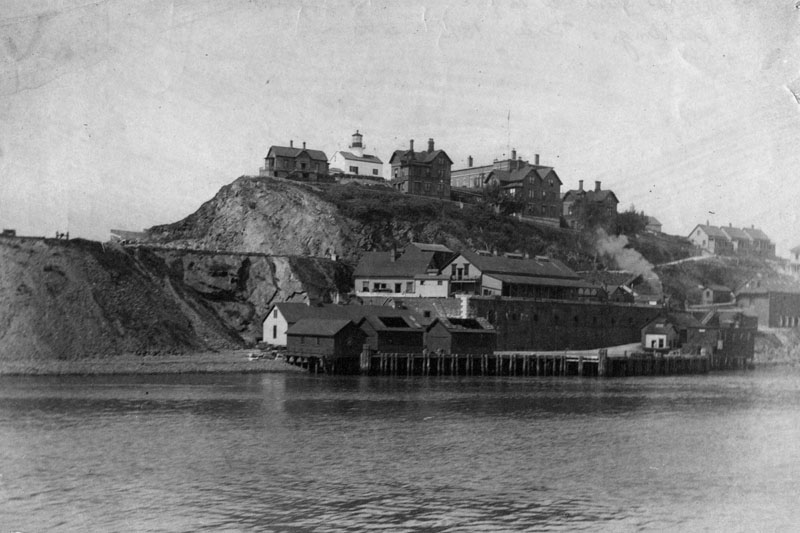
Alcatraz Island, 1896

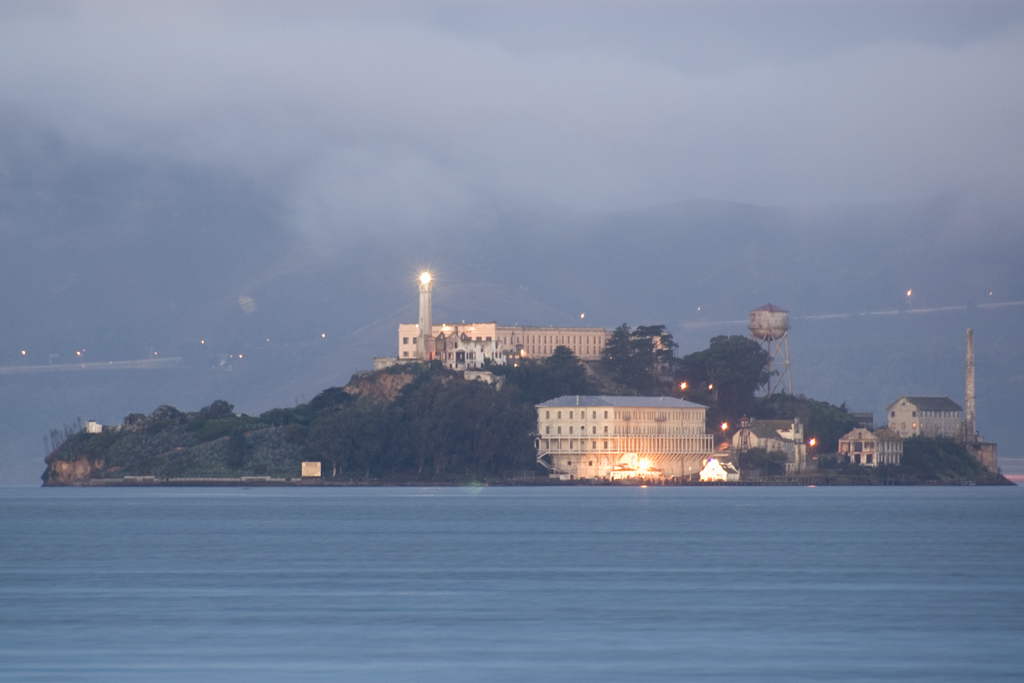
Alcatraz in the dawn mist, from the east. The "parade ground" is at left.

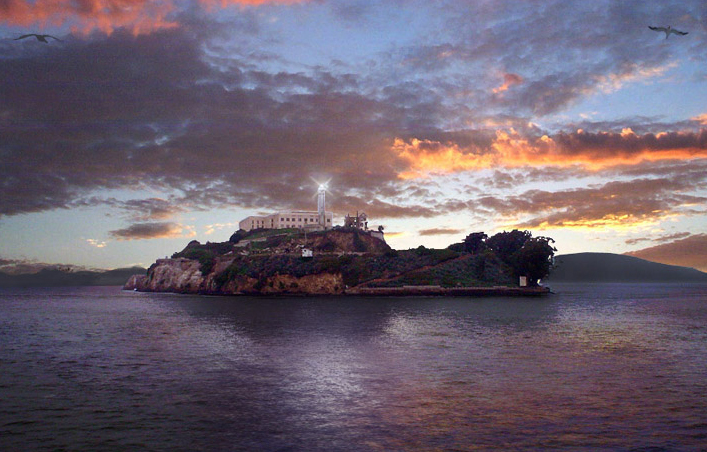
Alcatraz Island and lighthouse at sunset

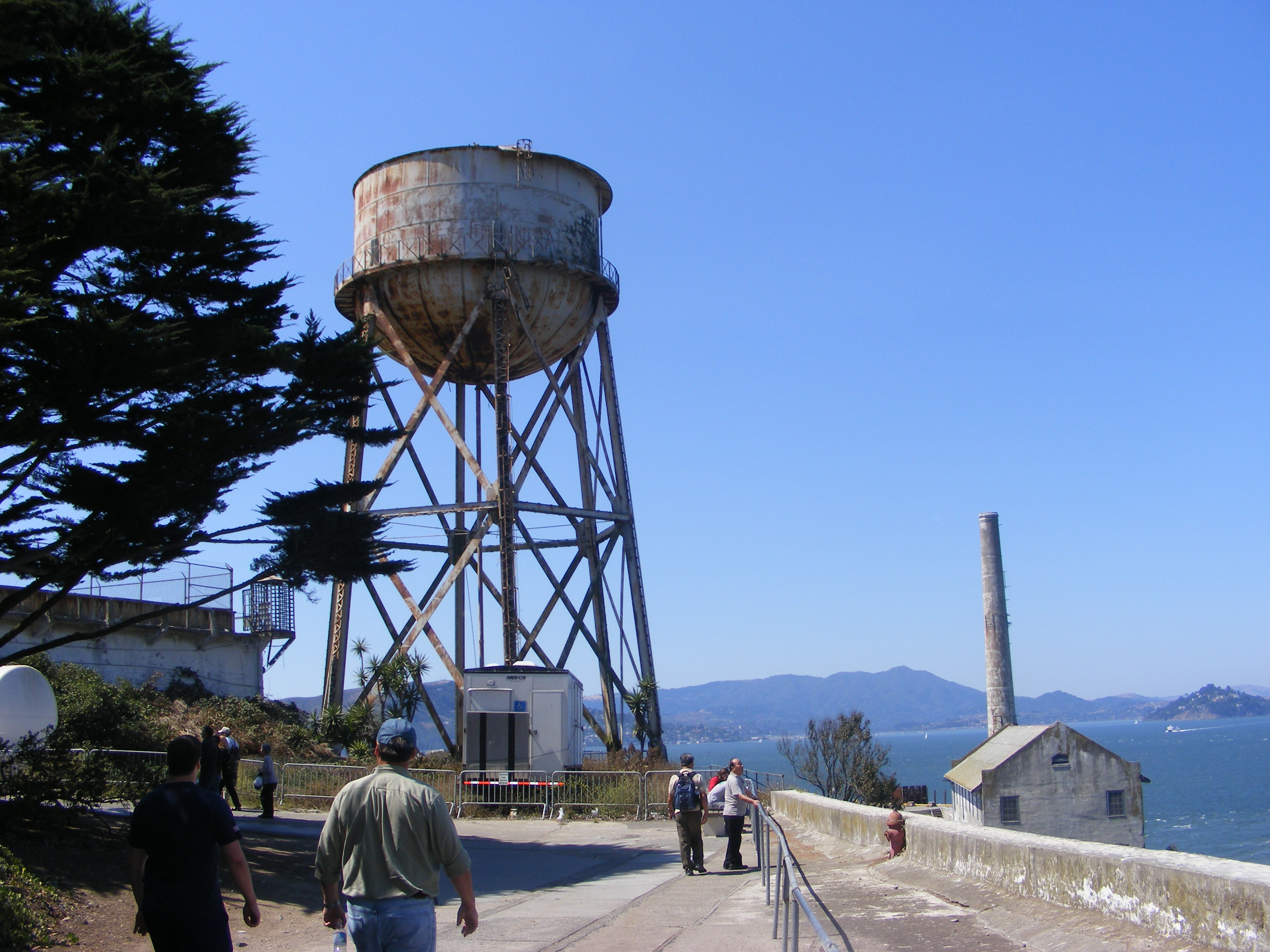
The water tower and powerhouse (at right), which generated electricity for the island

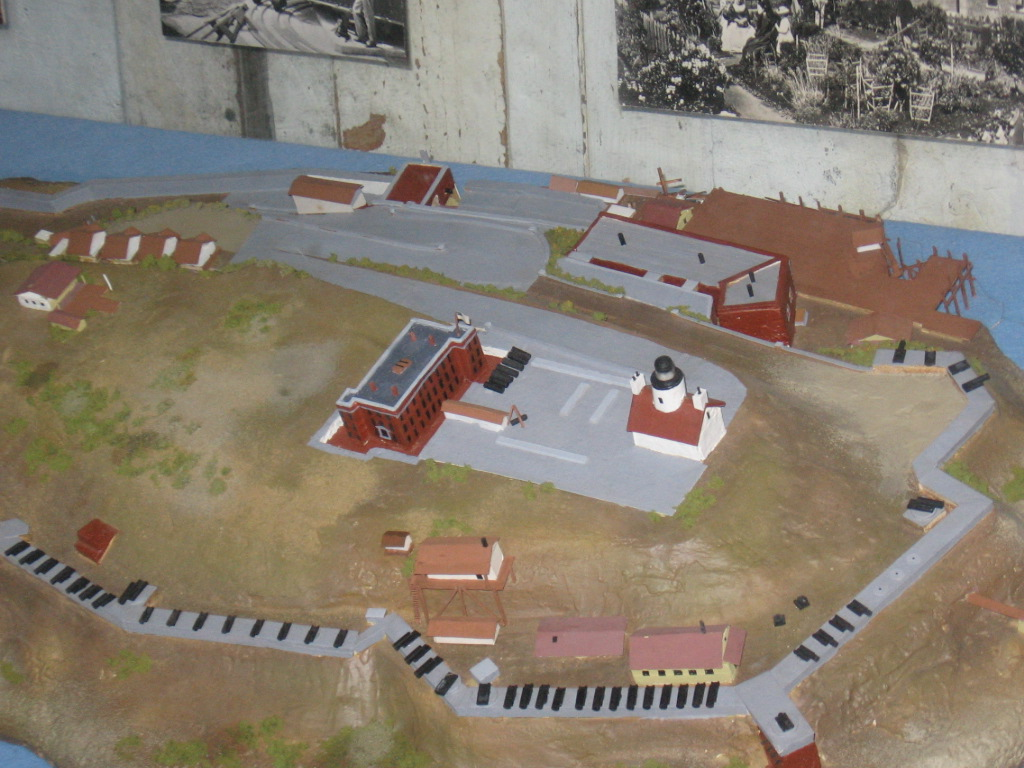
A model of Military Point Alcatraz, 1866–1868, now on display at Alcatraz Island

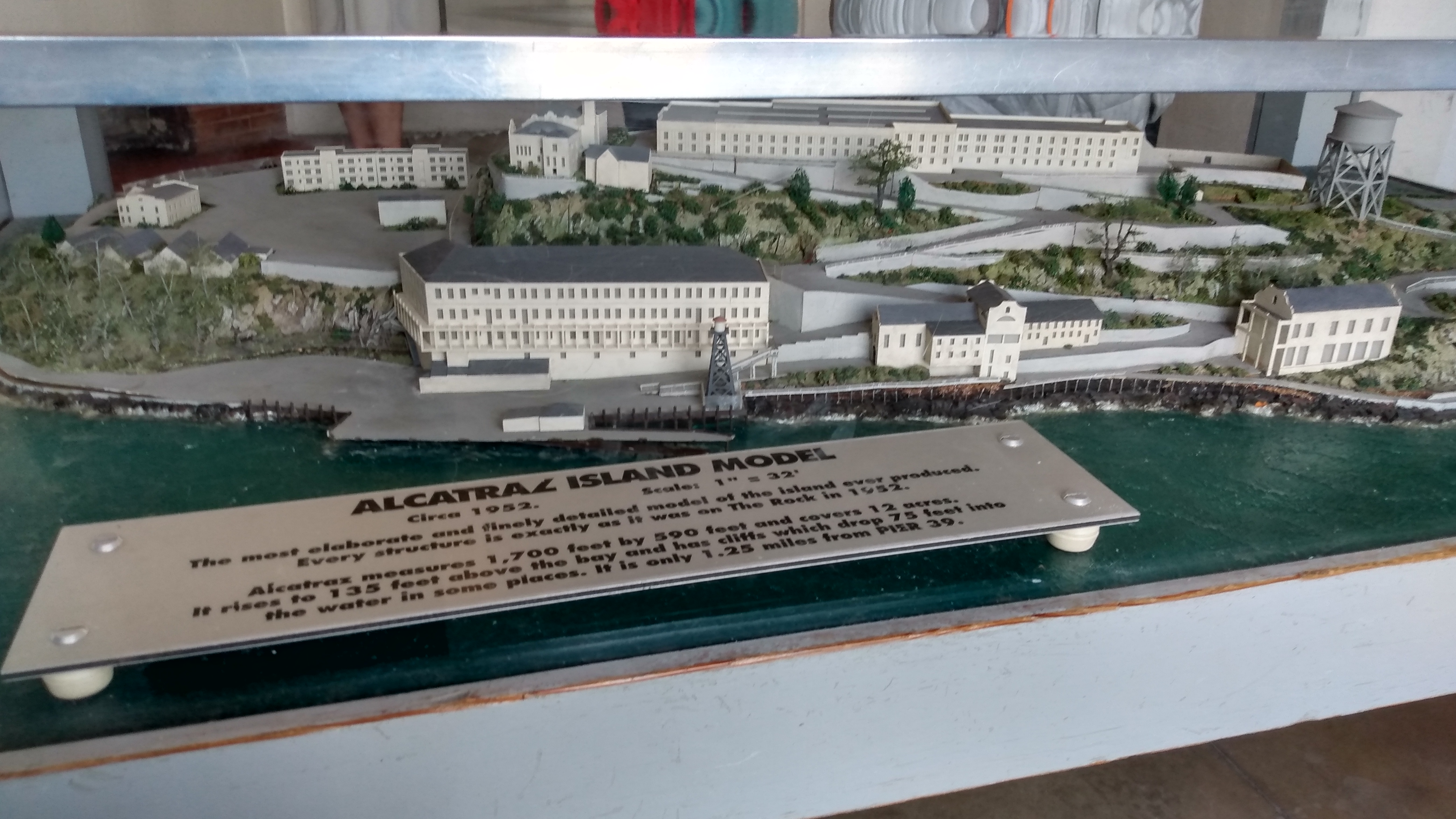
Model of the prison circa 1952, now on display at Alcatraz Island

The first European to document the islands of San Francisco Bay was Spanish naval officer and explorer Juan Manuel de Ayala during the Spanish rule of California; he charted San Francisco Bay in 1775. He named today's Yerba Buena Island as "La Isla de los Alcatraces", which translates as "The Island of the Gannets", but is commonly believed to translate as "The Island of the Pelicans" (the modern Spanish word for pelican is pelícano), from the archaic Spanish alcatraz ("pelican"). No gannets are native to the Pacific Coast, making the older Spanish usage more likely.

Yerba Buena Island was labeled on Ayala's 1775 chart of San Francisco Bay as "Isla de Alcatraces". The name was later applied to the rock now known as Alcatraz Island by Captain Frederick W. Beechey, an English naval officer and explorer.

Over time, the Spanish version "Alcatraz" became popular and is now widely used. In August 1827, for instance, French Captain Auguste Bernard Duhaut-Cilly wrote "... running past Alcatraze's (Pelicans) Island ... covered with a countless number of these birds. A gun fired over the feathered legions caused them to fly up in a great cloud and with a noise like a hurricane." The California brown pelican (Pelecanus occidentalis californicus) is not known to nest on the island today. The Spanish built several small buildings on the island and other minor structures.

=== Fort Alcatraz ===
The earliest recorded private owner of the island of Alcatraz is Julian Workman, to whom it was given by Mexican Governor Pio Pico in June 1846, with the understanding that Workman would build a lighthouse on it. Julian Workman is the baptismal name of William Workman, co-owner of Rancho La Puente and a personal friend of Pio Pico. Later in 1846, acting in his capacity as military governor of California, John C. Frémont bought the island for $5,000 in the name of the United States government from Francis Temple.

In 1850, President Millard Fillmore ordered that Alcatraz Island be set aside specifically as a United States military reservation, for military purposes based upon the U.S. acquisition of California from Mexico following the Mexican–American War. Frémont had expected a large compensation for his initiative in purchasing and securing Alcatraz Island for the U.S. government, but the U.S. government later invalidated the sale and paid Frémont nothing. Frémont and his heirs sued for compensation during protracted but unsuccessful legal battles that extended into the 1890s.

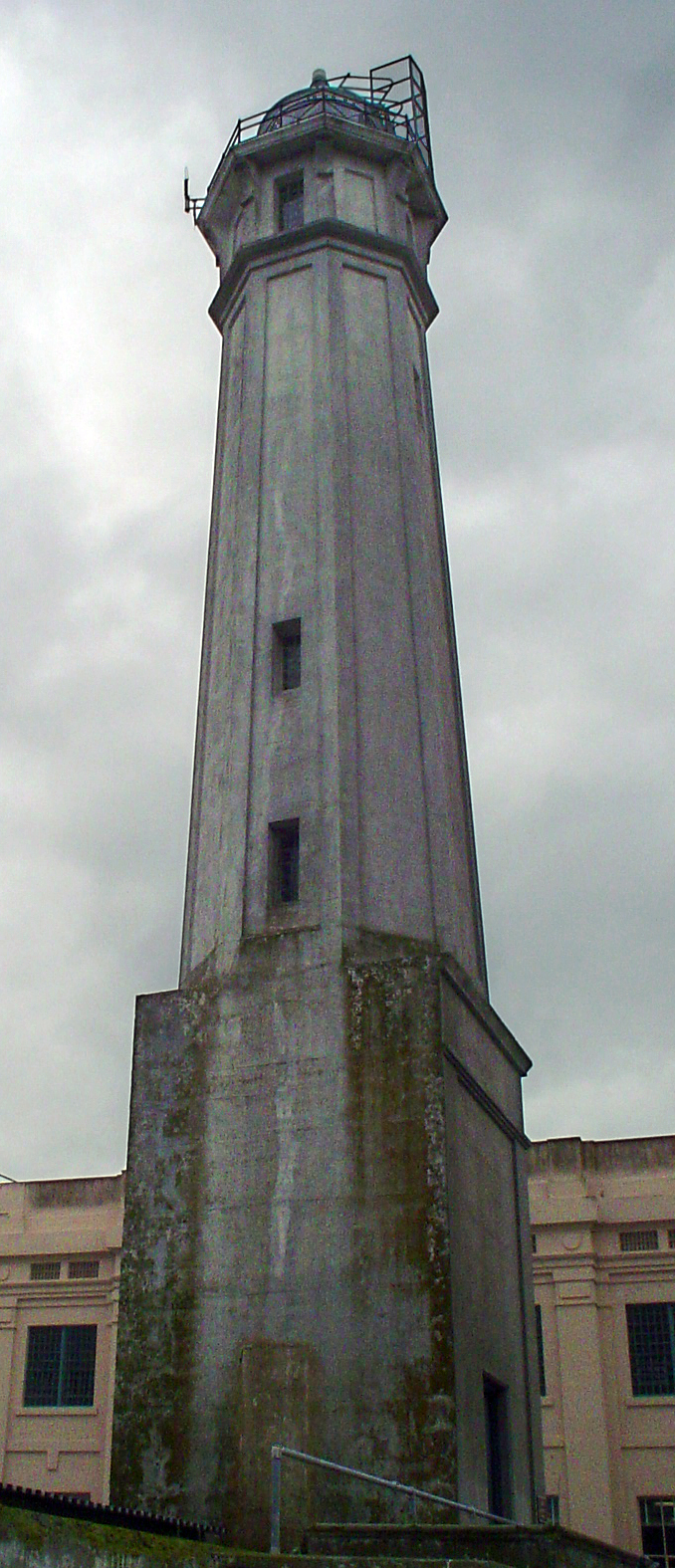
The lighthouse tower adjacent to the prison cell house

Following the acquisition of California by the United States as a result of the Treaty of Guadalupe Hidalgo (1848), which ended the Mexican–American War, and the onset of the California Gold Rush the following year, the U.S. Army began studying the suitability of Alcatraz Island for the positioning of coastal batteries to protect the approaches to San Francisco Bay. In 1853, under the direction of Zealous B. Tower, the United States Army Corps of Engineers began fortifying the island, work which continued until 1858, when the initial version of Fort Alcatraz was complete. The island's first garrison, numbering about 200 soldiers, arrived at the end of that year.

When the American Civil War broke out in 1861, the island mounted 85 cannons (increased to 105 cannons by 1866) in casements around its perimeter, though the small size of the garrison meant only a fraction of the guns could be used at one time. At this time, it also served as the San Francisco Arsenal for storage of firearms to prevent them falling into the hands of Confederate sympathizers. Alcatraz, built as a "heavily fortified military site on the West Coast", was to form a "triangle of defense" with Fort Point and Lime Point, but the contemplated work on Lime Point was never built. The first operational lighthouse on the West Coast of the United States was also built on Alcatraz. During the war, Fort Alcatraz was used to imprison Confederate sympathizers and privateers on the west coast, but its guns were never fired at an enemy.

Studies of the island and its fortifications have included archeological surveys relying on contemporary technology. In 2019 "Binghamton University archaeologist Timothy de Smet and colleagues located historical remains beneath the former recreation yard of the Alcatraz Federal Penitentiary." Using ground-penetrating radar (GPR) data and georectifications, Smet and colleagues discovered structures, including "a 'bombproof' earthwork traverse along with its underlying vaulted brick masonry tunnel and ventilation ducts," in surprisingly good condition. Archaeologists also found the remains of ammunition magazines, and tunnels below the penitentiary that was built later.

Because of the isolation created by the cold, strong currents of the waters of San Francisco Bay, as early as 1859, Alcatraz was used to house soldiers convicted of crimes. By 1861, the fort was the military prison for the Department of the Pacific. It housed Civil War prisoners of war (POWs) as early as that year.

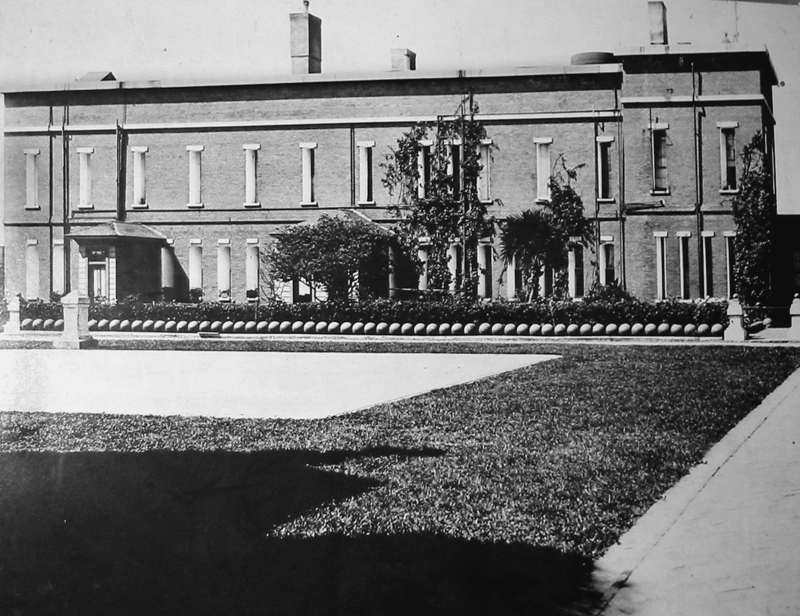
Alcatraz citadel built in the early 1850s; 1908 photo

Starting in 1863, the military also held private citizens accused of treason, after the writ of habeas corpus in the United States was suspended. Hundreds of troops were trained on the island, with more than 350 military personnel in place by April 1861. As enlistees were assigned to units, new green troops reported for training. In early 1865, the number of men reached 433, the peak of the war.

During the Civil War-era, rapid changes in artillery and fortification were generated. Alcatraz's defenses were obsolete by the postwar years. Modernization efforts, including an ambitious plan to level the entire island and construct shell-proof underground magazines and tunnels, were undertaken between 1870 and 1876 but never completed (the so-called "parade ground" on the southern tip of the island represents the extent of the flattening effort). Instead, the army switched the focus of its plans for Alcatraz from coastal defense to detention, a task for which it was well suited because of its isolation.

In 1867, a brick jailhouse was built (previously inmates had been kept in the basement of the guardhouse), and in 1868, Alcatraz was officially designated as a long-term detention facility for military prisoners. The facility was later discontinued for Prisoners of War in 1846. Among those incarcerated at Alcatraz were Confederates caught on the West Coast and some Hopi Native American men in the 1870s, who refused orders to send their children away from their families to Indian boarding schools.

In 1898, due to the Spanish–American War, the prison population rose from 26 to over 450. From 1905 to 1907 it was commanded by U.S. Army Major George W. McIver. After the 1906 San Francisco earthquake, civilian prisoners were transferred to Alcatraz for safe confinement. On March 21, 1907, Alcatraz was officially designated as the Western U.S. Military Prison, later Pacific Branch, U.S. Disciplinary Barracks, 1915.

In 1909 construction began on the huge concrete main cell block, designed by Major Reuben Turner, which remains the island's dominant feature. It was completed in 1912. To accommodate the new cell block, the Citadel, a three-story barracks, was demolished down to the first floor, which was below ground level. The building had been constructed in an excavated pit, creating a defensive dry moat. The first floor was incorporated as a basement to the new cell block, giving rise to the popular legend of "dungeons" below the main cell block. The US Disciplinary Barracks was deactivated in October 1933 and transferred to the Bureau of Prisons.

During World War I, the prison was used to hold conscientious objectors, including Philip Grosser, who wrote a pamphlet entitled Uncle Sam's Devil's Island about his experiences.

=== Alcatraz Federal Penitentiary ===
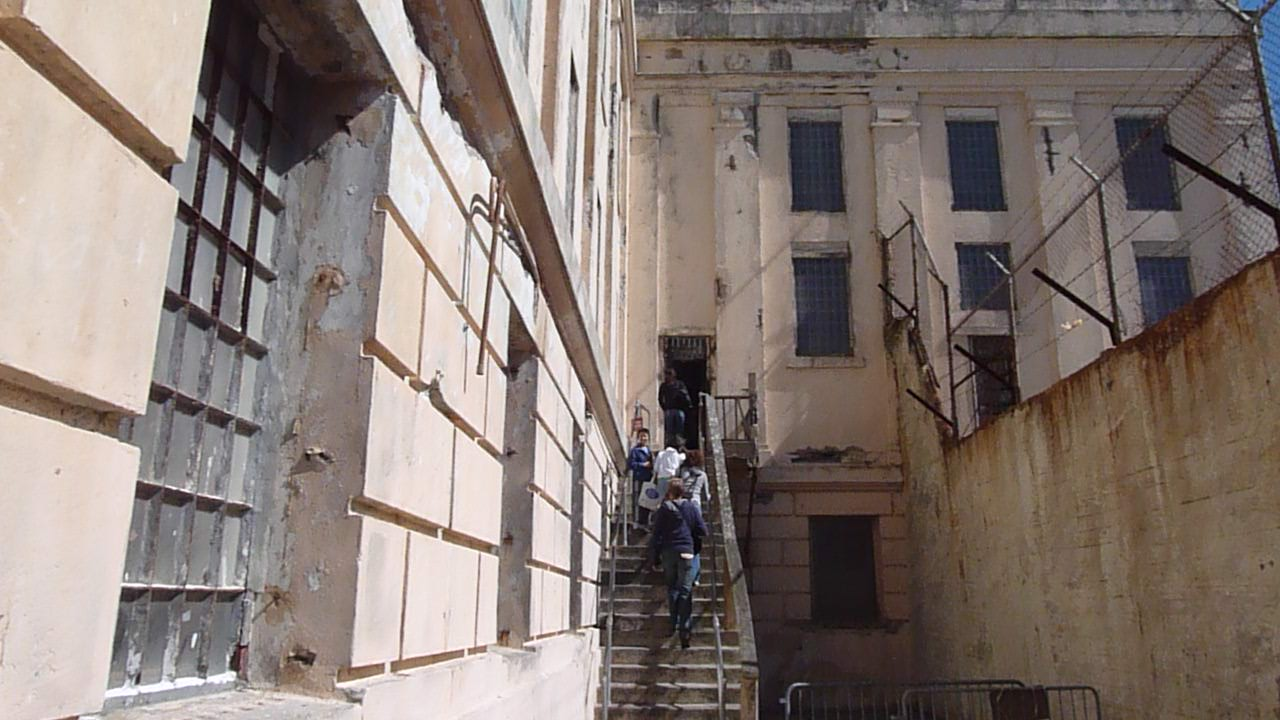
An exterior view of the Alcatraz main cell block from the exercise yard

The United States Disciplinary Barracks on Alcatraz were acquired by the United States Department of Justice on October 12, 1933, and the island was designated as a federal prison in August 1934. Alcatraz was designed to hold prisoners who continuously caused trouble at other federal prisons. At 9:40 am on August 11, 1934, the first batch of 137 prisoners arrived at Alcatraz, arriving by railroad from the United States Penitentiary in Leavenworth, Kansas, to Santa Venetia, California. They were escorted to Alcatraz, while handcuffed in high security coaches and guarded by 60 special FBI agents, U.S. Marshals and railway security officials.

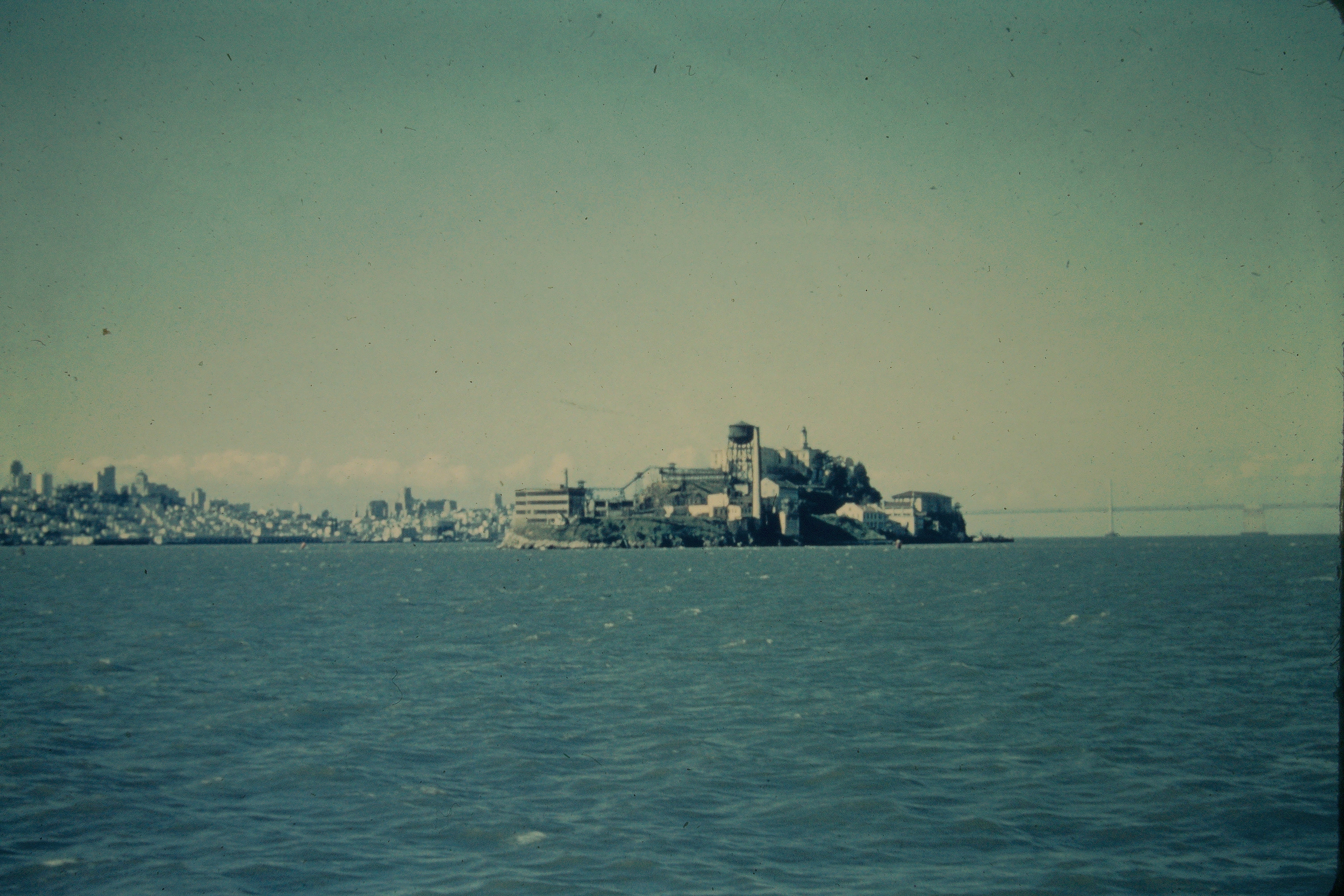
Alcatraz Island seen from San Francisco in 1955 when the penitentiary was in operation

Most of the prisoners were notorious bank robbers and murderers. The prison initially had a staff of 155, including the first warden James A. Johnston and associate warden J. E. Shuttleworth, both considered to be "iron men". The staff were highly trained in security, but not rehabilitation. Despite what was said about the jail, prisoners requested to be transferred to Alcatraz Island due to its single-cell occupancy and high quality of food.

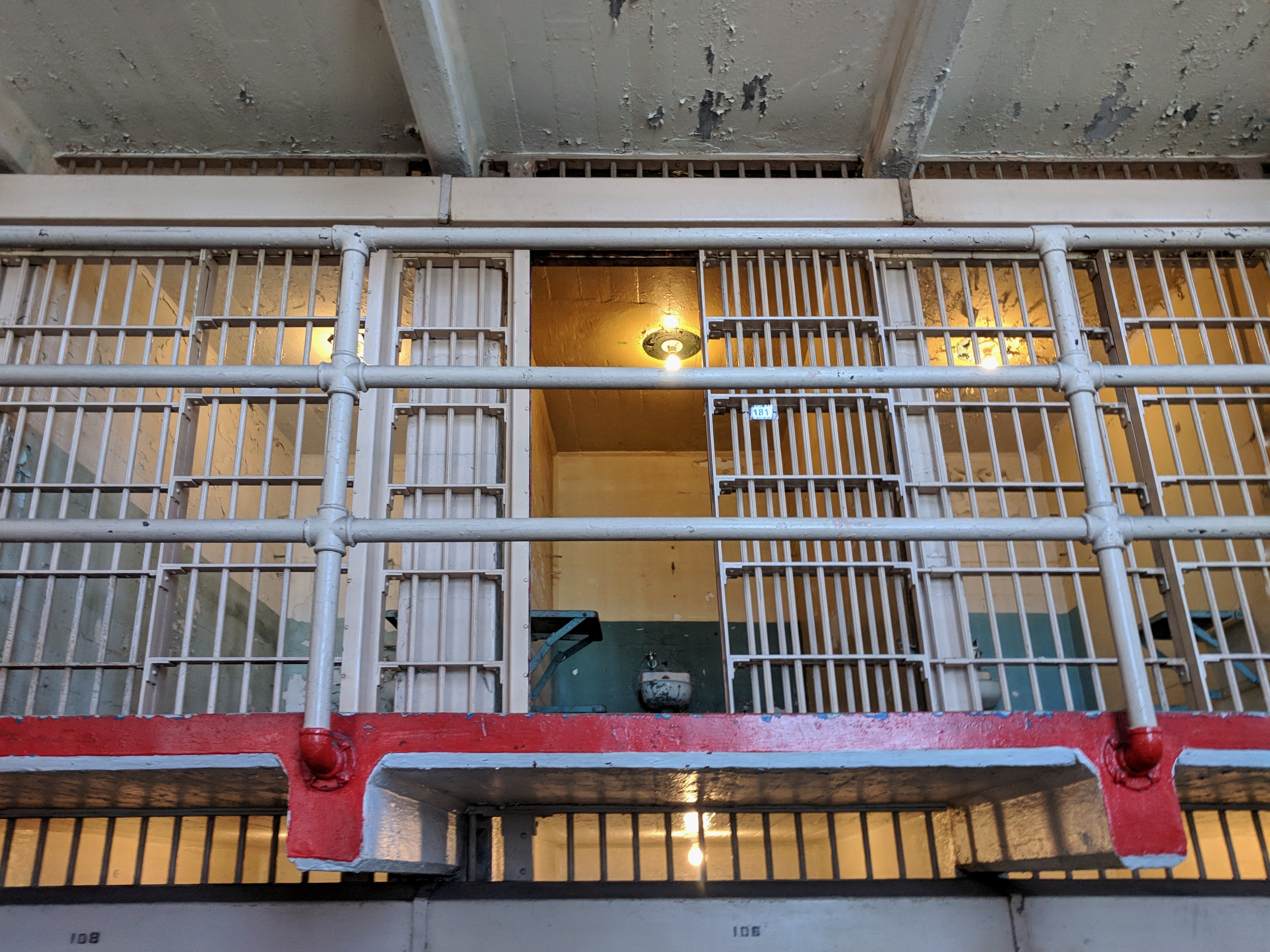
Cell 181 in Alcatraz where Al Capone was imprisoned

During the 29 years it was in use, the prison held some of the most notorious criminals in American history, including gangsters such as Al Capone, Robert Franklin Stroud (the "Birdman of Alcatraz"), George "Machine Gun" Kelly and Bumpy Johnson, and political terrorists such as Rafael Cancel Miranda, a member of the Puerto Rican Nationalist Party who attacked the United States Capitol building in 1954. Others included Mickey Cohen, Arthur R. "Doc" Barker, and Alvin "Creepy" Karpis, who served more time at Alcatraz than any other inmate.

Alcatraz Island also served as a residential community for Bureau of Prisons staff and their families. Correctional officers and their families lived in designated apartment buildings on the island. Children attended a dedicated school and, years later, many created an Alumni Association to share memories and reflect on their distinctive experience growing up on “The Rock.”

Contrary to popular belief, it was possible to escape and swim all of the way to shore. During its 29 years of operation, the penitentiary claimed that no prisoner successfully escaped. A total of 36 prisoners made 14 escape attempts, two men trying twice. 23 were caught alive, six were shot and killed during their escape, two drowned, and five are listed as "missing and presumed drowned". The most violent incident occurred on May 2, 1946, when a failed escape attempt by six prisoners led to the Battle of Alcatraz. Perhaps the most famous is the intricate escape, carried out on June 11, 1962, by Frank Morris, John Anglin, and Clarence Anglin. The three men are believed to have drowned in their attempt. No bodies were ever found, sparking speculation that they made it to shore and escaped.

On June 11, 1962, brothers John and Clarence Anglin and Frank Morris escaped Alcatraz prison. John, Clarence, and Frank were all doing time for committing crimes such as bank robbery. They did this by digging through a vent for approximately three months, once they reached the top it took additional time to file down the bolts of the roof vents. They used sharpened spoons, a vacuum cleaner motor drill, and any other tools they could find to make the hole in the vent bigger and get through the bolted roof top vent. To fulfill their plan of escaping they made realistic dummy heads by using papier-mâché to disguise them while the guards did nightly checks. They used hair clippings to make it believable that they were still sleeping in their beds during nightly checks. Getting out of the prison was only half their plan: they had to make it 1.25 miles to shore in shark infested waters. They created rafts out of prison rain jackets and several life preservers; they contracted this idea from magazines they had read while in prison. They came up with a waterproof glue as well to keep the raft together in the water. Then they made wooden paddles out of leftover wood scraps and plywood found around the prison. To inflate their raft, they stole a concertina. At around 10pm on June 11th 1962 they made the escape and were never seen again. A fourth prisoner, Allen West, had intended to escape with Morris and the Anglins, but failed to get out of his cell in time. He later cooperated with the FBI during their investigation, revealing the finer details of the escape plan.

Although most escapees were caught or drowned, in 1962, prisoner John Paul Scott made it to the shore. He was so weary that police found him unconscious and in hypothermic shock. The annual Escape from Alcatraz Triathlon includes a required 1.5-mile (2.4 km) swim from the island to the bay shore.

=== Closing of the prison ===
There are several reasons that Alcatraz closed as a penitentiary in 1963. The penitentiary cost much more to operate than other prisons (nearly $10 per prisoner per day, as opposed to $3 per prisoner per day at Atlanta). Additionally, there was no source of fresh water on the island; nearly one million gallons per week had to be transported from the mainland. Half a century of salt water saturation had severely eroded the buildings and three prisoners had purportedly escaped in 1962. In the years after its closure, the San Francisco mayor's office received various public proposals to repurpose Alcatraz Island.

=== Native American occupation ===
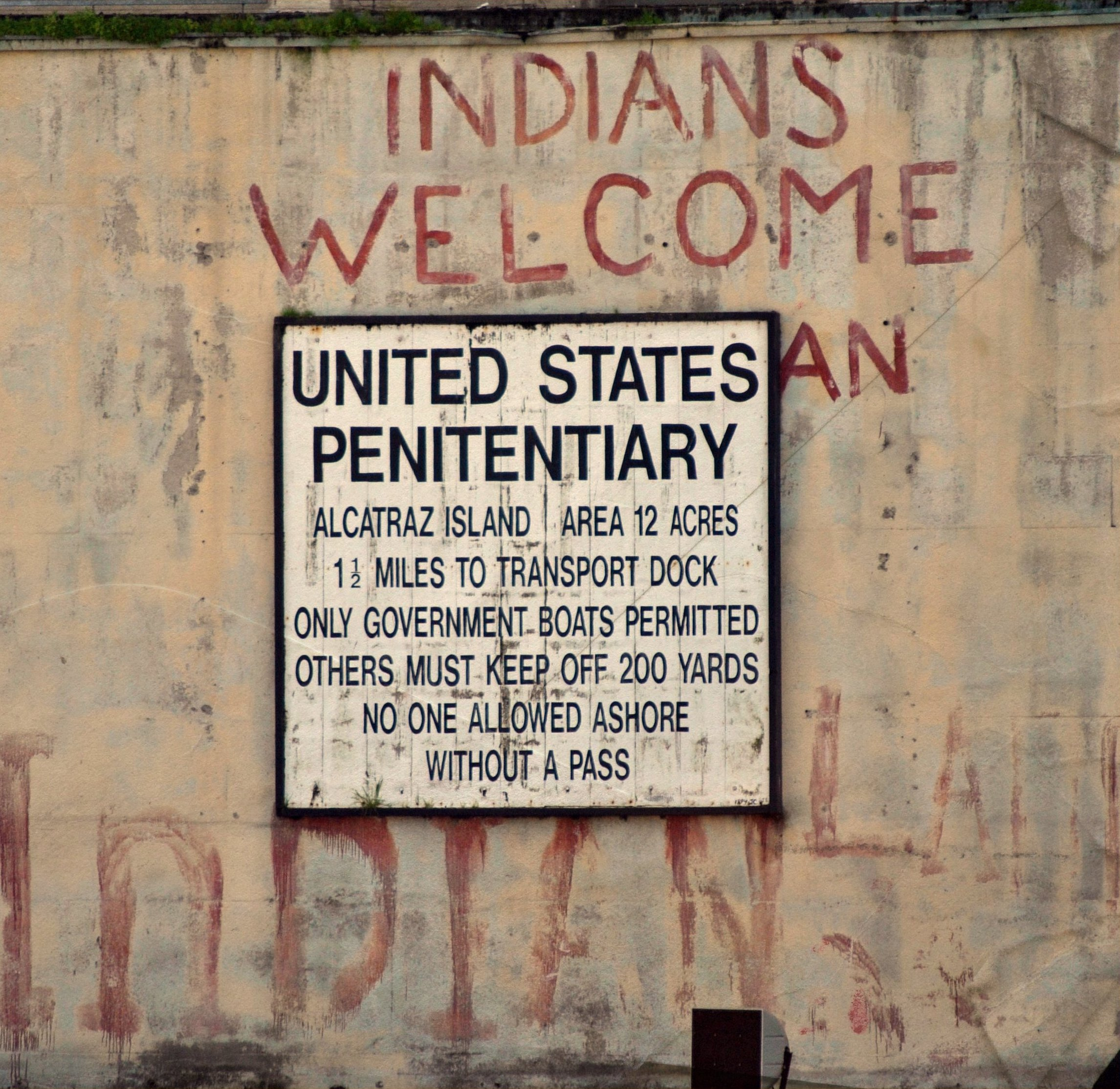
A lingering sign of the 1969–1971 Native American occupation

Alcatraz Island was occupied by Native American activists for the first time on March 8, 1964. The protest, proposed by Lakota Sioux activist Belva Cottier and joined by about 35 others, was reported by, among others, the San Francisco Chronicle and the San Francisco Examiner.

Beginning on November 20, 1969, a group of Native Americans called United Indians of All Tribes, mostly college students from San Francisco, occupied the island to protest federal policies related to American Indians. Some of them were children of Native Americans who had relocated in the city as part of the Bureau of Indian Affairs' (BIA) Indian termination policy, which was a series of laws and policies aimed at the assimilation of Native Americans into mainstream US society. It encouraged Native Americans to move away from the Indian reservations and into cities to take advantage of health, educational and employment opportunities. A number of employees of the Bureau of Indian Affairs also occupied Alcatraz at that time, including Doris Purdy, an amateur photographer, who later produced footage of her stay on the island.

The occupiers, who stayed on the island for nearly two years, demanded that the island's facilities be adapted and new structures built for an Indian education center, ecology center, and cultural center. The American Indians claimed the island by provisions of the Treaty of Fort Laramie (1868) between the US and the Sioux; they said the treaty promised to return all retired, abandoned, or out-of-use federal lands to the native peoples from whom they were acquired. Indians of All Tribes claimed Alcatraz Island by the "Right of Discovery"; as historian Troy R. Johnson states in The Occupation of Alcatraz Island, generations of indigenous peoples knew about Alcatraz at least 10,000 years before any European knew about any part of North America. Begun by urban Indians of San Francisco, the occupation attracted other Native Americans from across the country, including American Indian Movement (AIM) urban activists from Minneapolis.

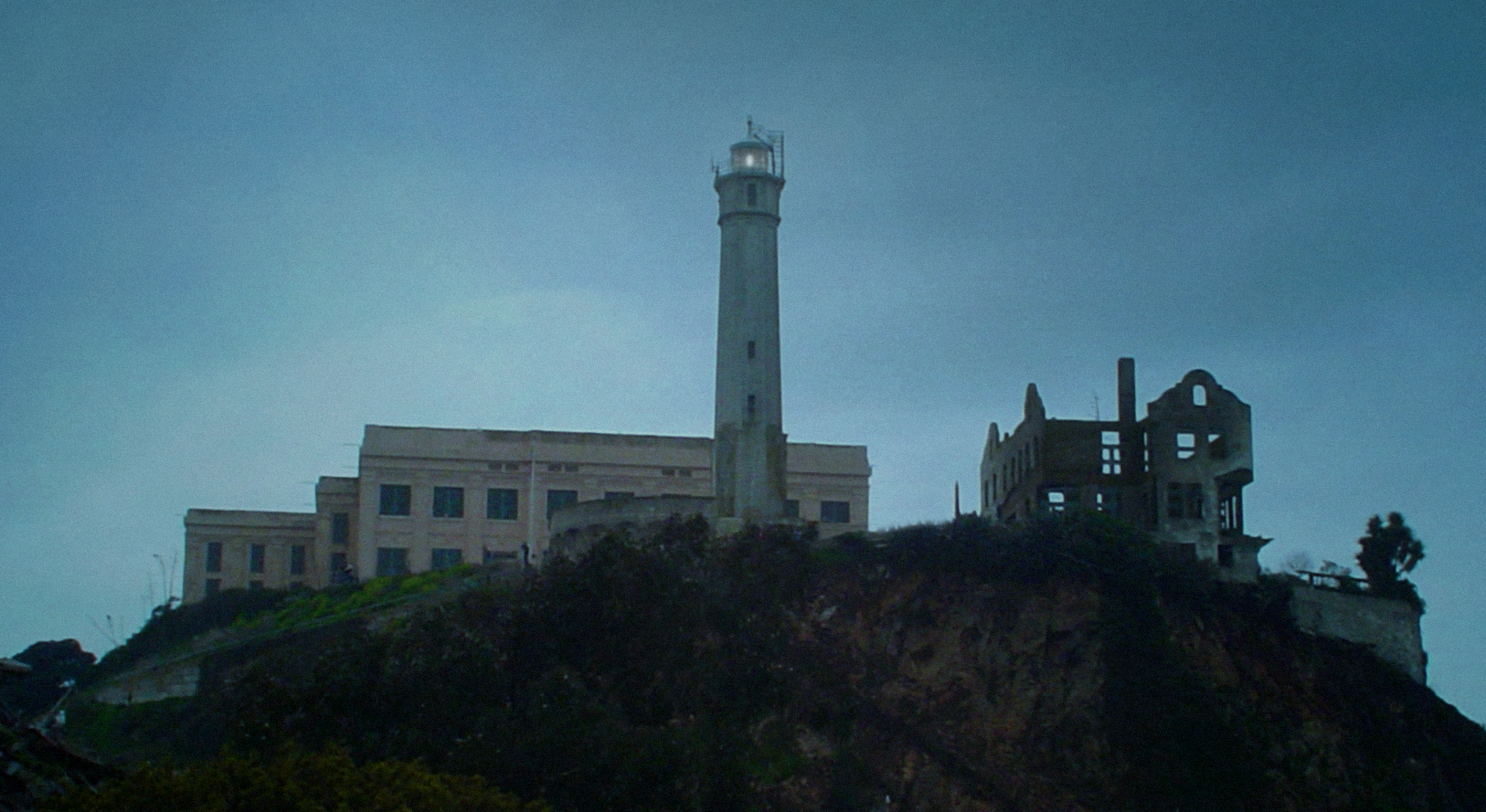
The Alcatraz cellhouse, lighthouse, and Warden's House, which was burned out during the 1969–1971 Native American occupation

During the nineteen months and nine days of occupation by the American Indians, several buildings at Alcatraz were damaged or destroyed by fire, including the lighthouse keeper's home, the warden's home, the Officers' Club, the recreation hall, and the Coast Guard quarters. The origin of the fires is disputed. The US government demolished a number of other buildings (mostly apartments) after the occupation had ended. Graffiti from the period of Native American occupation is still visible at many locations on the island.

During the occupation, President Richard Nixon rescinded the Indian termination policy, designed by earlier administrations to end federal recognition of many tribes and their special relationship with the US government. He established a new policy of self-determination, in part as a result of the publicity and awareness created by the occupation. The occupation ended on June 11, 1971.

=== Alcatraz under the National Park Service ===
In 1972, the National Park Service purchased Alcatraz along with Fort Mason from the U.S. Army to establish the Golden Gate National Recreation Area. Under "An Act to Establish the Golden Gate National Recreation Area" President Richard Nixon allocated $120 million for land acquisition and development of the area. It operates as a tourist site and museum dedicated to its time as a federal penitentiary. Operating costs still remain one of its biggest challenges.

On May 4, 2025, President Donald Trump proposed reopening the island's prison. Later that night, Trump told reporters that his Alcatraz plan was "just an idea I've had" to counter the "radicalized judges [that] want to have trials for every single—think of it—every single person that's in our country illegally," a reference to his invocation of the Alien Enemies Act to conduct mass deportations of Venezuelan and Salvadoran illegal immigrants, which had been blocked by multiple judges. The White House budget in 2026 requested $152 million to reopen the prison as a secure facility.

== Landmarks ==
Part of the Golden Gate National Recreation Area since 1972, the entire Alcatraz Island was listed on the National Register of Historic Places in 1976. In 1986 it was designated as a National Historic Landmark, the highest recognition.

In 1993, the National Park Service published a plan entitled Alcatraz Development Concept and Environmental Assessment. This plan, approved in 1980, doubled the area of Alcatraz accessible to the public, in order to enable visitors to enjoy its scenery and bird, marine, and animal life.

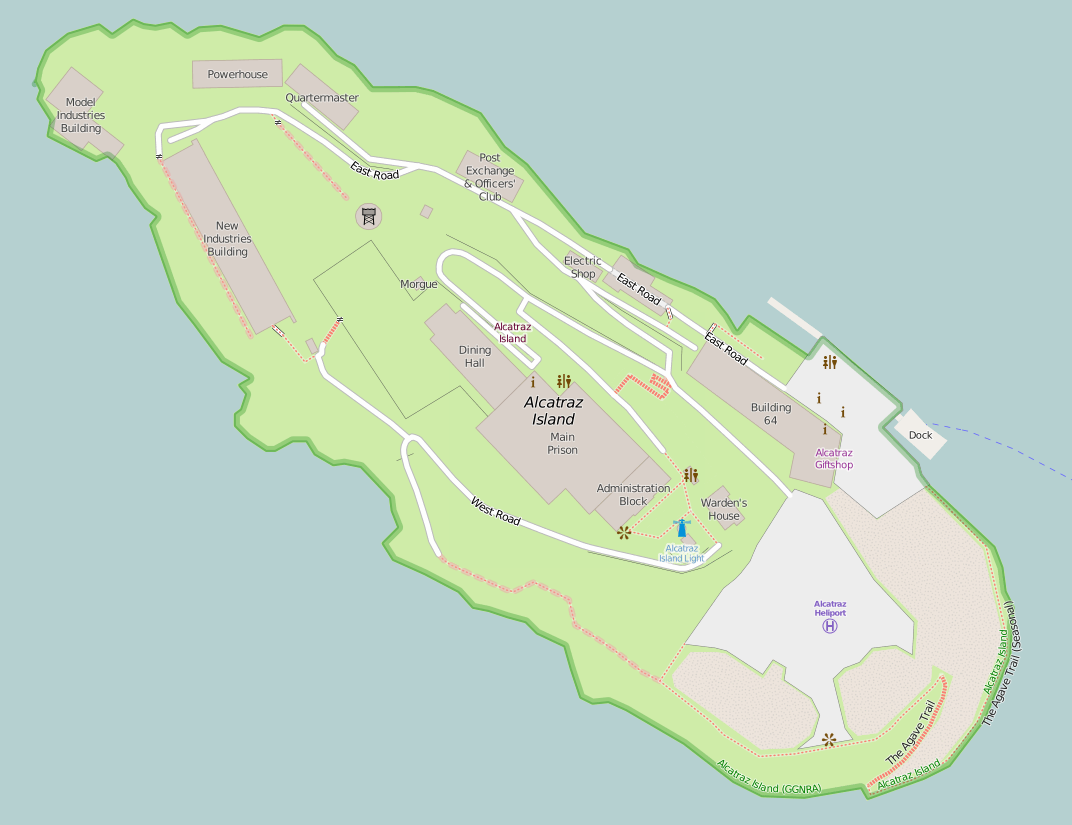
Map of Alcatraz

Major sites in the cultural landscape include:

- Boat Dock
- Building 64
- Citadel
- Dining Hall
- Former Military Chapel (Bachelor Quarters)
- Helipad (FAA LID: CA27)
- Library
- Lighthouse
- Main Cellhouse
- Model Industries Building
- Morgue
- New Industries Building
- Officers' Club
- Parade Grounds
- Power House
- Recreation Yard
- Warden's House
- Water Tower

== Development ==
American Indigenous groups, such as the International Indian Treaty Council, occasionally hold ceremonies on the island, most notably, their "Sunrise Gatherings" every Columbus Day and Thanksgiving Day.

Around 2007, the Global Peace Foundation proposed to raze the prison and build a peace center in its place. Supporters collected 10,350 signatures – sufficient to have it placed as a proposition on the presidential primary ballots in San Francisco for February 5, 2008. The proposed plan was estimated at US$1 billion. For the plan to pass, Congress would have to have taken Alcatraz out of the National Park Service. Critics of the plan said that Alcatraz is too rich in history to be destroyed. On February 6, 2008, the Alcatraz Island Global Peace Center Proposition C failed to pass, with 72% of voters rejecting the proposition.

The coastal environment of the San Francisco Bay Area has caused deterioration and corrosion of building materials throughout Alcatraz. Beginning in 2011, the National Park Service began major renovations on the island, including the installation of solar panels on the cell house roof, slope stabilization near the Warden's House, and the stabilization and rehabilitation of the outer cell house walls.

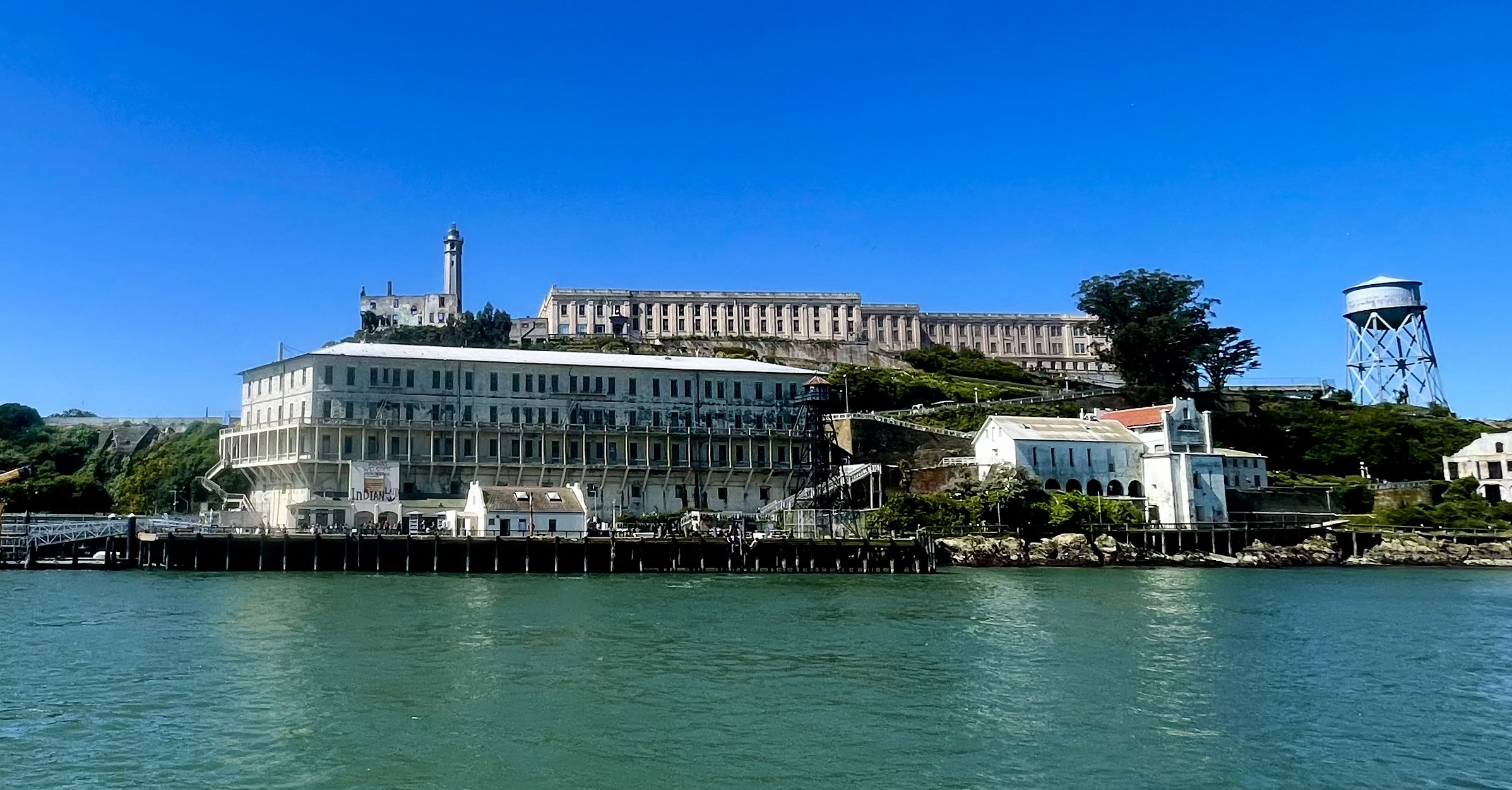
Boat dock in 2024

Now one of San Francisco's major tourist attractions, Alcatraz drew some 1.7 million visitors annually according to a 2018 report. Visitors arrive by ferry, operated under contract by Alcatraz Cruises LLC at Pier 33. The 2018 report indicated that "former prison buildings are being conserved and seismically upgraded and additional areas of the Island are opened to the public as safety hazards are removed". During the COVID-19 pandemic, the buildings and the island remained closed to the public for more than a year (and ferry services were suspended), reopening in March 2021.

== Art ==
Alcatraz has been home to several art installations. In 2014, Chinese artist/dissident Ai Weiwei staged an exhibition which explored "questions about human rights and freedom of expression" called @Large. This exhibition included Lego portraits of famous political prisoners. The creation of the exhibition was featured in a 2019 documentary film, Ai Weiwei: Yours Truly. In 2016, Nelson Saiers used math and prison slang as central elements in a six-month installation that called attention to the imposition of long prison sentences.

== Fauna and flora ==
=== Habitat ===
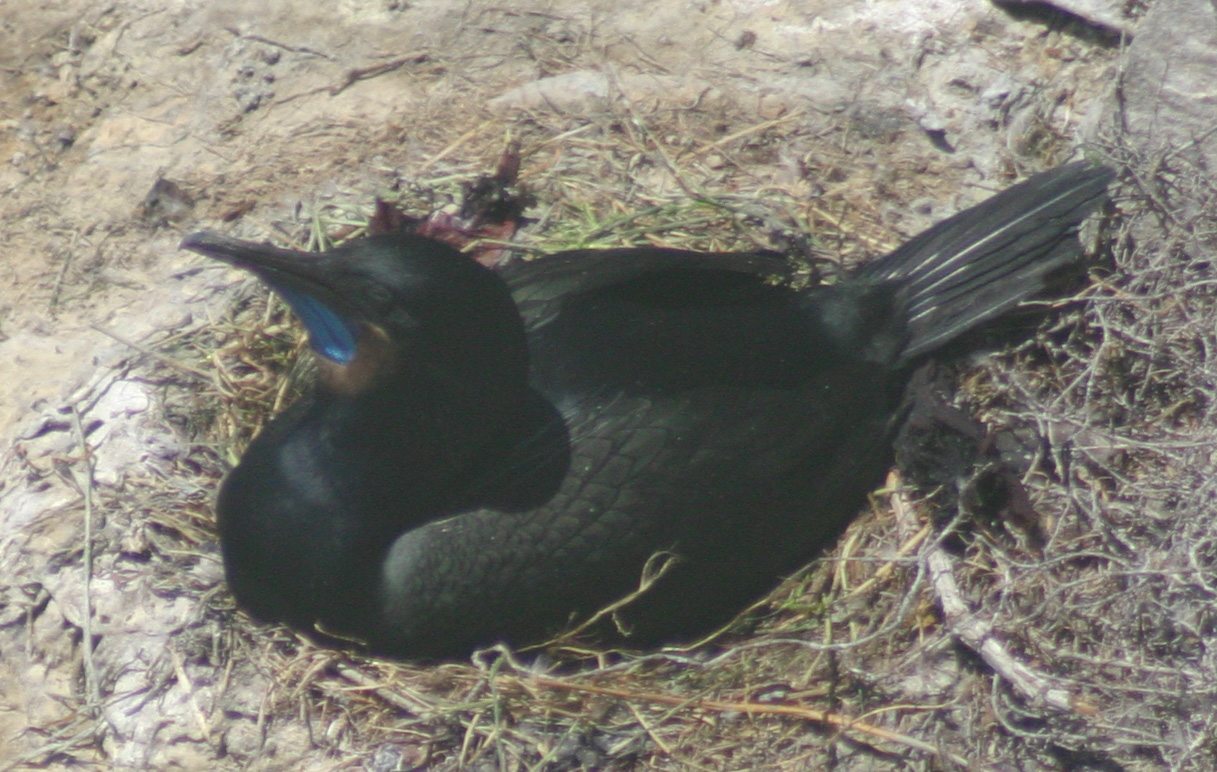
Brandt's cormorant nesting on Alcatraz Island

- Cisterns: A bluff that, because of its moist crevices, is believed to be an important site for California slender salamanders.
- Cliff tops at the island's north end: Containing a onetime manufacturing building and a plaza, the area is listed as important to nesting and roosting birds.
- The powerhouse area: A steep embankment where native grassland and creeping wild rye support a habitat for deer mice.
- Tide pools: One of the few complexes in San Francisco Bay, the island's tide pools were created by quarrying activities, and contain a variety of typical invertebrate species.
- Western cliffs and cliff tops: Rising to heights of nearly 100 feet (30 m), they provide nesting and roosting sites for seabirds including pigeon guillemots, cormorants, Heermann's gulls, and western gulls. Harbor seals can occasionally be seen on a small beach at the base.
- The parade grounds: Carved from the hillside during the late 19th century and covered with rubble since the government demolished guard housing in 1971, the area has become a habitat and breeding ground for black-crowned night herons, western gulls, slender salamanders, and deer mice.
- The Agave Path, a trail named for its dense growth of agave: Located atop a shoreline bulkhead on the south side, it provides a nesting habitat for night herons.
- In recent years from the months of August to October, large numbers of cormorant flies can be found on the island.

=== Flora ===
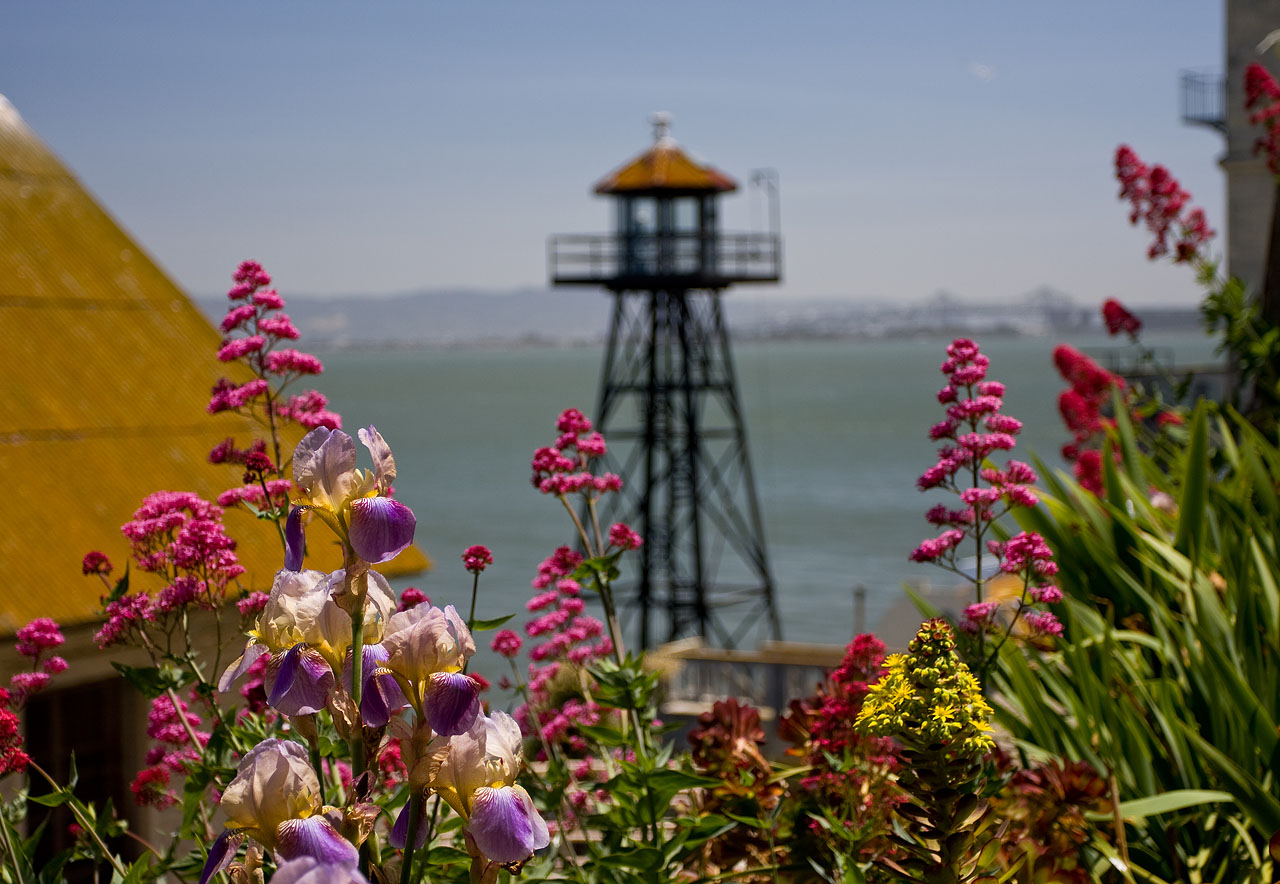
Flowers on Alcatraz

Gardens planted by families of the original Army post, and later by families of the prison guards, fell into neglect after the prison closure in 1963. After 40 years, they are being restored by a paid staff member and many volunteers, thanks to funding by the Garden Conservancy and the Golden Gate National Parks Conservancy. The untended gardens had become severely overgrown and had developed into a nesting habitat and sanctuary for numerous birds. Now, areas of bird habitat are being preserved and protected, while many of the gardens are being restored to their original state.

In clearing out the overgrowth, workers found that many of the original plants were growing where they had been planted – some more than 100 years ago. Numerous heirloom rose hybrids, including a Welsh rose (Bardou Job) that had been believed to be extinct, have been discovered and propagated. Many species of roses, succulents, and geraniums are growing among apple and fig trees, banks of sweet peas, manicured gardens of cutting flowers, and wildly overgrown sections of native grasses with blackberry and honeysuckle.

== In popular culture ==
Alcatraz Island appears often in media and popular culture, including films: Birdman of Alcatraz (1962), Point Blank (1967), The Enforcer (1976), Escape from Alcatraz (1979), Slaughterhouse Rock (1988),The Super Mario Bros. Super Show! (1989), Carmen Sandiego (1991), Murder in the First (1995), The Rock (1996), Catch Me If You Can (2002), X-Men: The Last Stand (2006), The Book of Eli (2010), and Resident Evil: Death Island (2023). The island also appears in J. J. Abrams' 2012 television series Alcatraz.

It also was featured in the anime Yu-Gi-Oh! Duel Monsters, the book Al Capone Does My Shirts and the video game Tony Hawk's Pro Skater 4 as a playable level. It is also showcased as a playable racetrack in the 1997 arcade racing video game San Francisco Rush the Rock: Alcatraz Edition. Alcatraz has been portrayed often as a safe haven or base of operations in many post-apocalyptic movies, such as The Book of Eli.

Escape from Alcatraz and The Rock are two films that show how inescapable the island is. Escape from Alcatraz is based on the true story of a few inmates trying to flee the island. The Rock is an action film featuring Alcatraz.

Alcatraz Island also appeared in the zombies gamemode of Call of Duty: Black Ops II, as "Mob of the Dead", and later in the game Call of Duty: Black Ops 4 zombies map "Blood of the Dead".

== Gallery ==
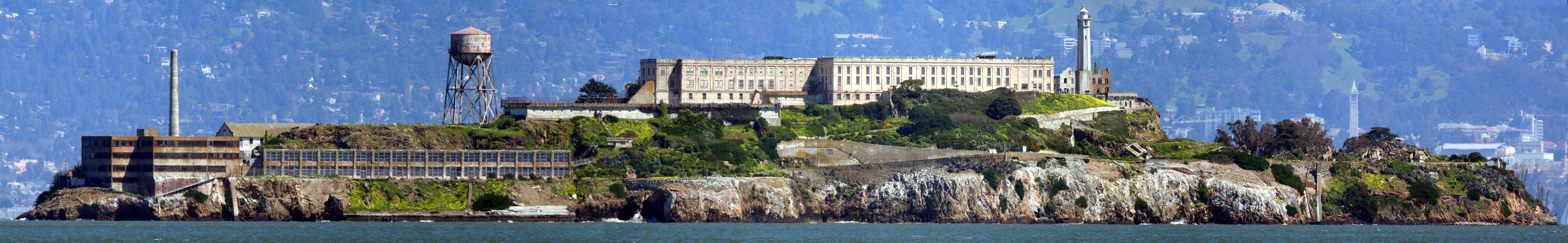
A panorama of Alcatraz as viewed from San Francisco Bay, facing east. Sather Tower and UC Berkeley are visible in the background on the right.

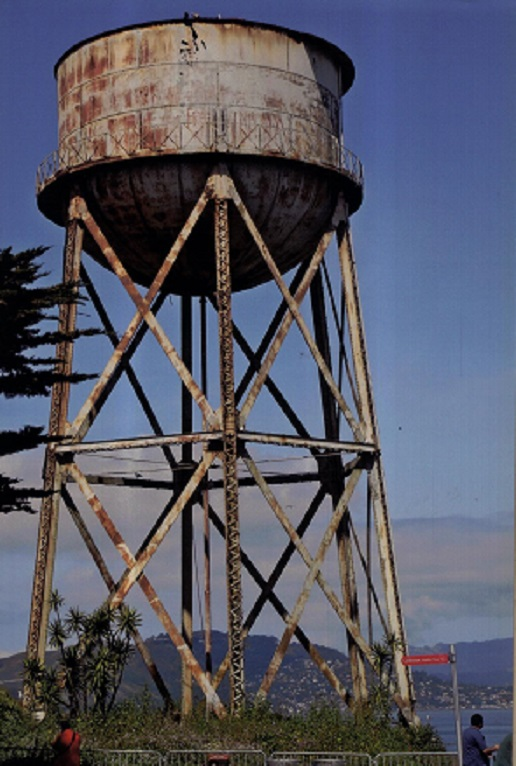
Different view of the Water Tower built in 1940.

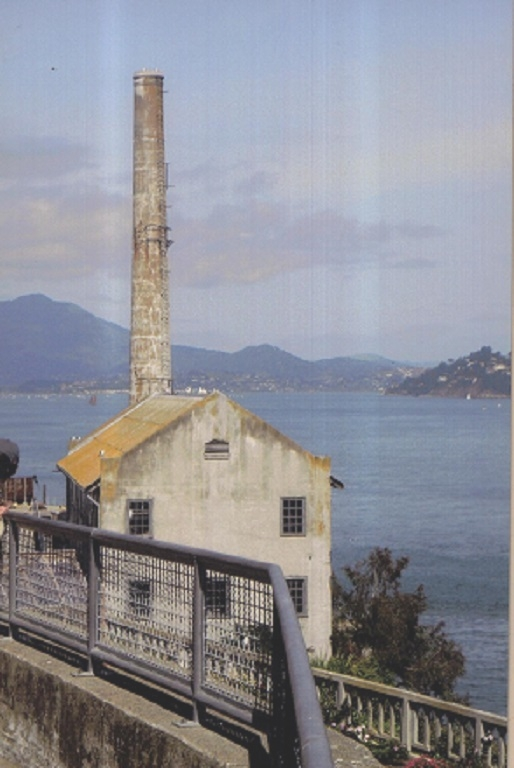
Alcatraz Utility House and Power Plant Chimney, built in 1939.

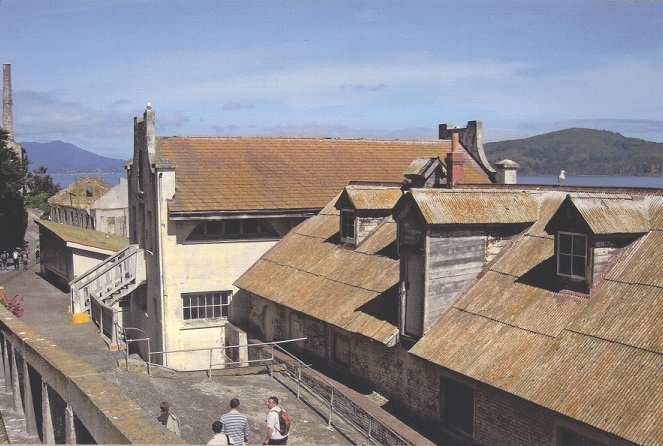
School House (two-story building in the middle) and the Electric Repair shop (foreground) built in 1930s.

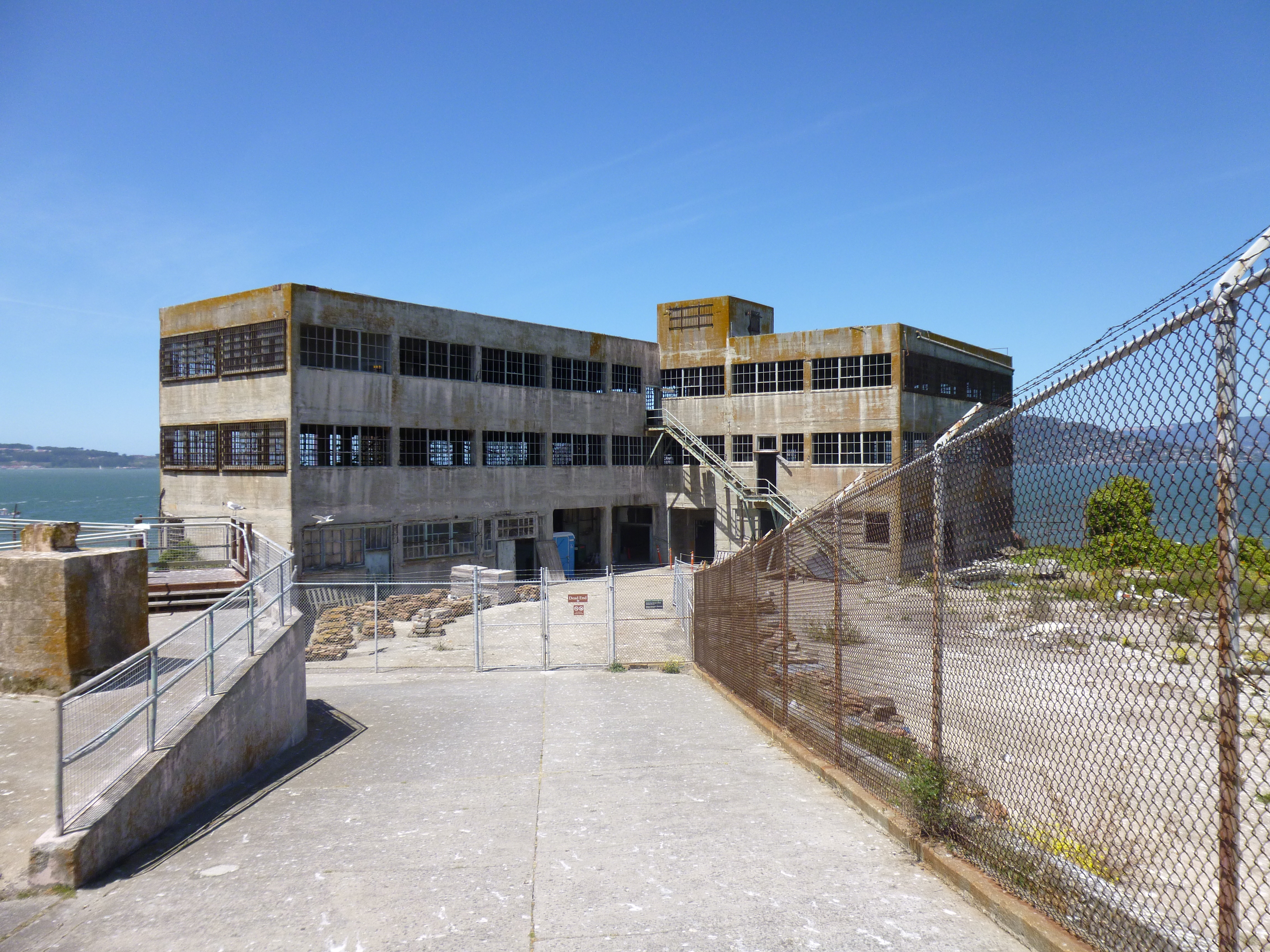
Alcatraz, outside (2012)

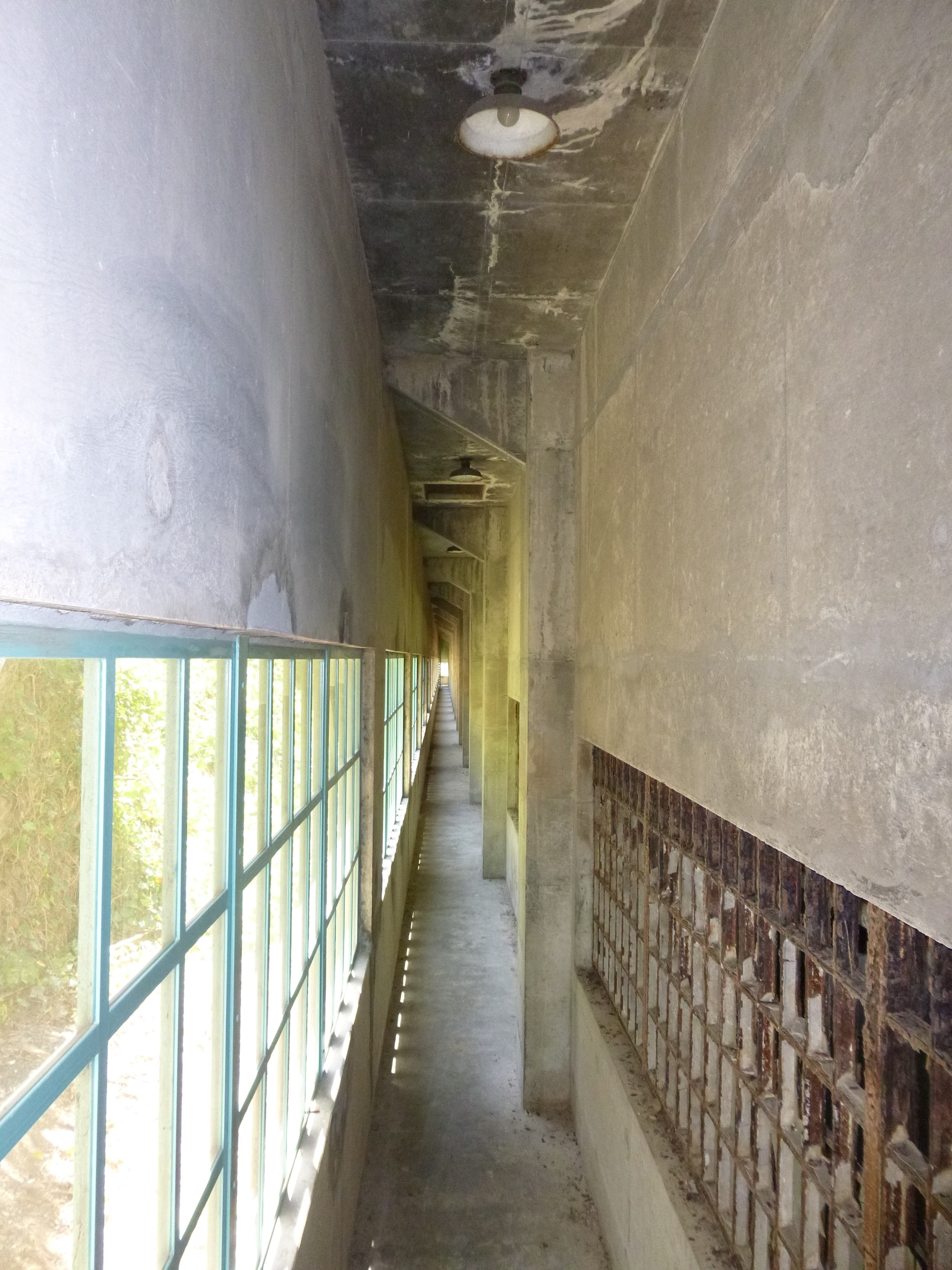
Alcatraz, hallway (2013)

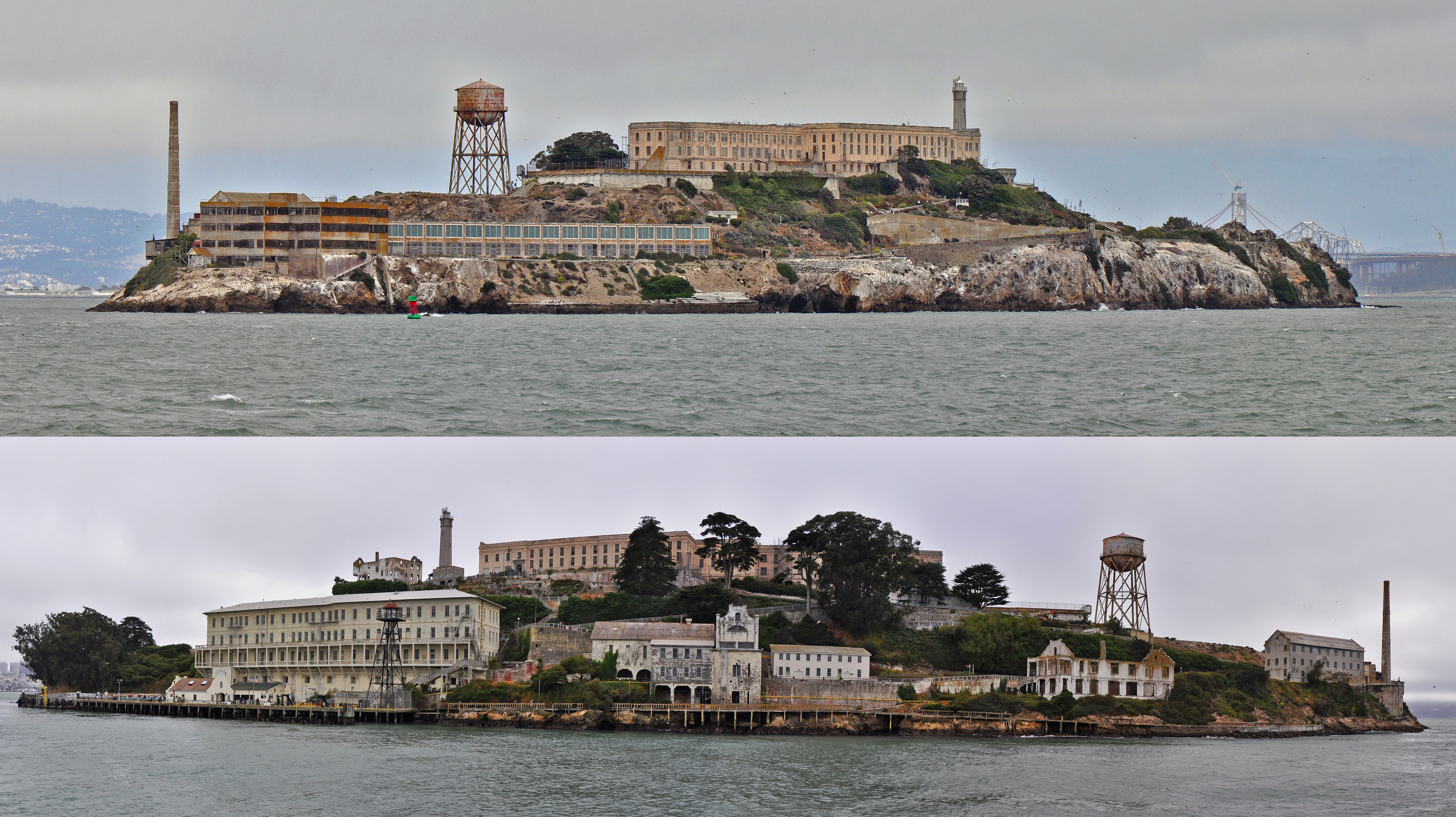
Views of both long sides of the island.

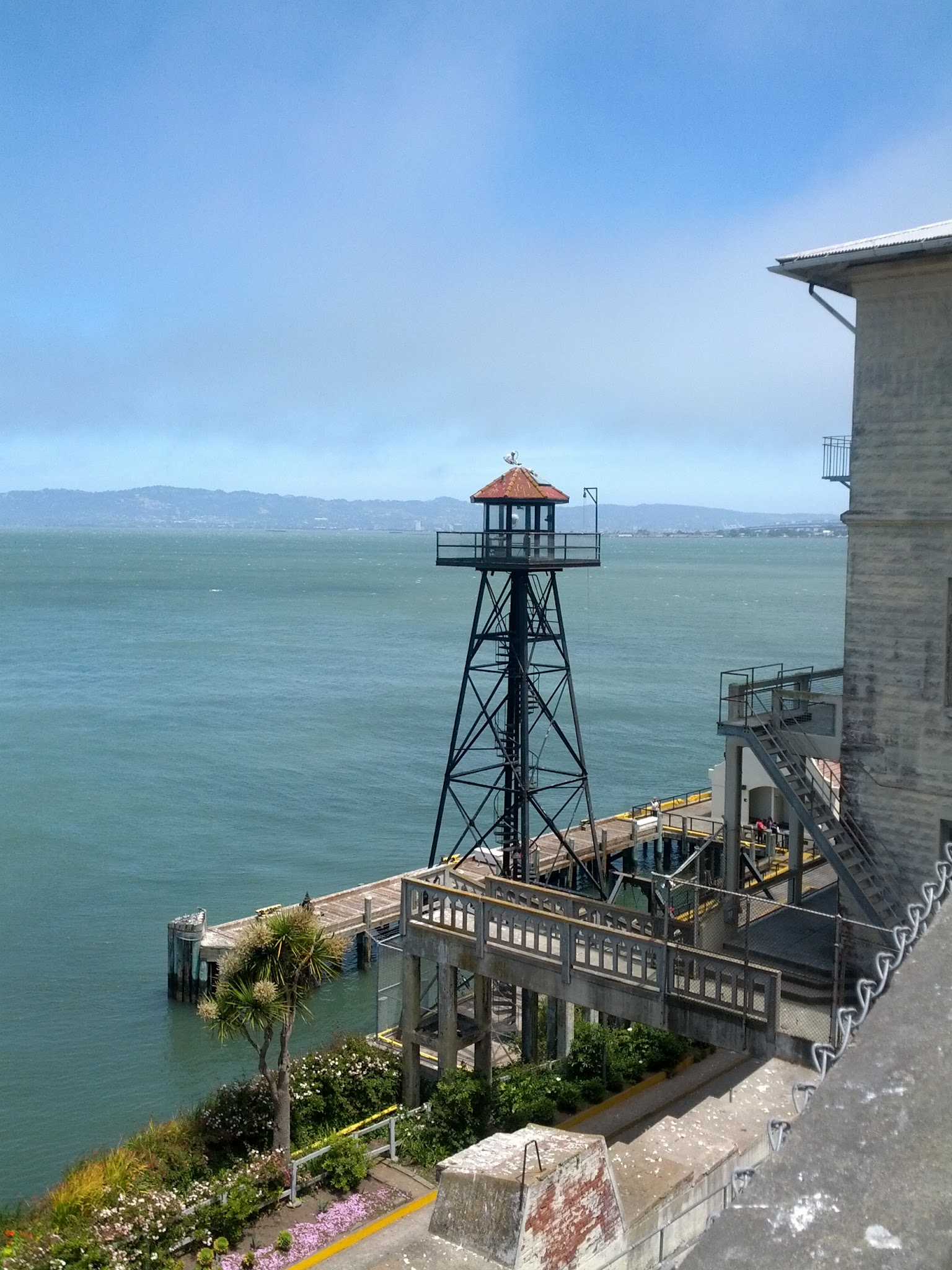
Alcatraz Island harbor guards tower.

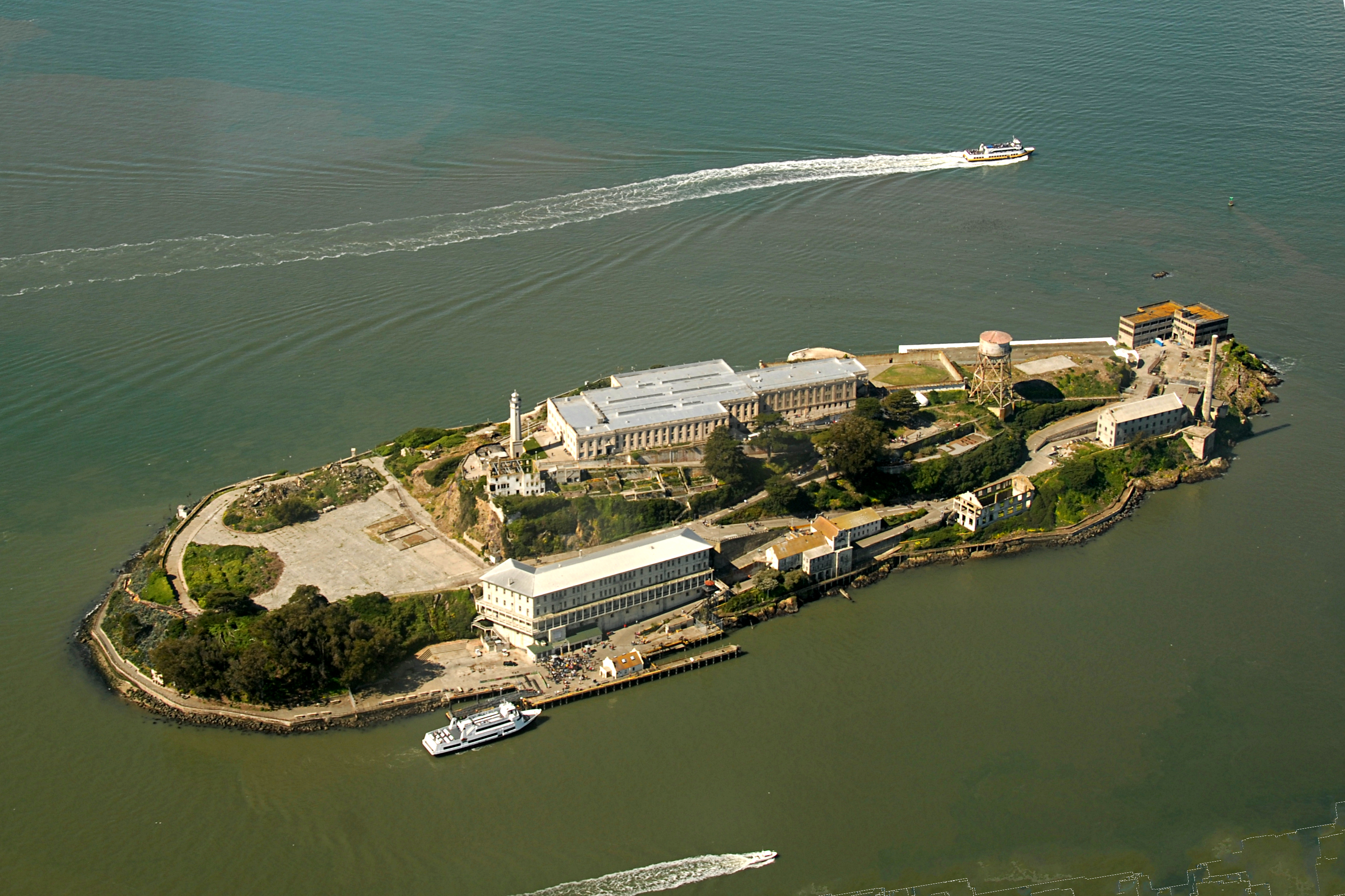
Alcatraz Island view from the west. Image shot from an altitude of approximately 1,800 ft (549 m).

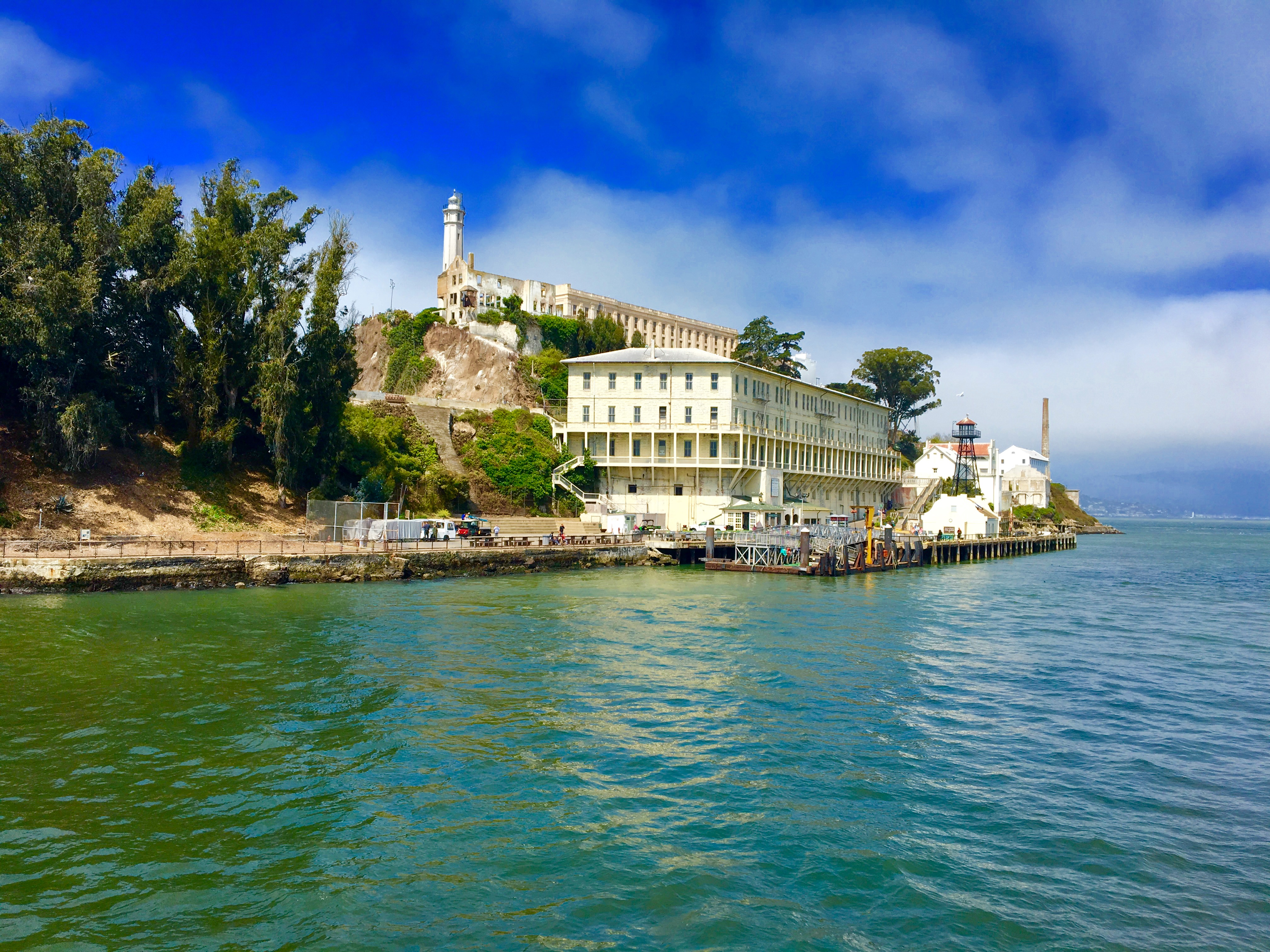
Alcatraz view from tour boat.

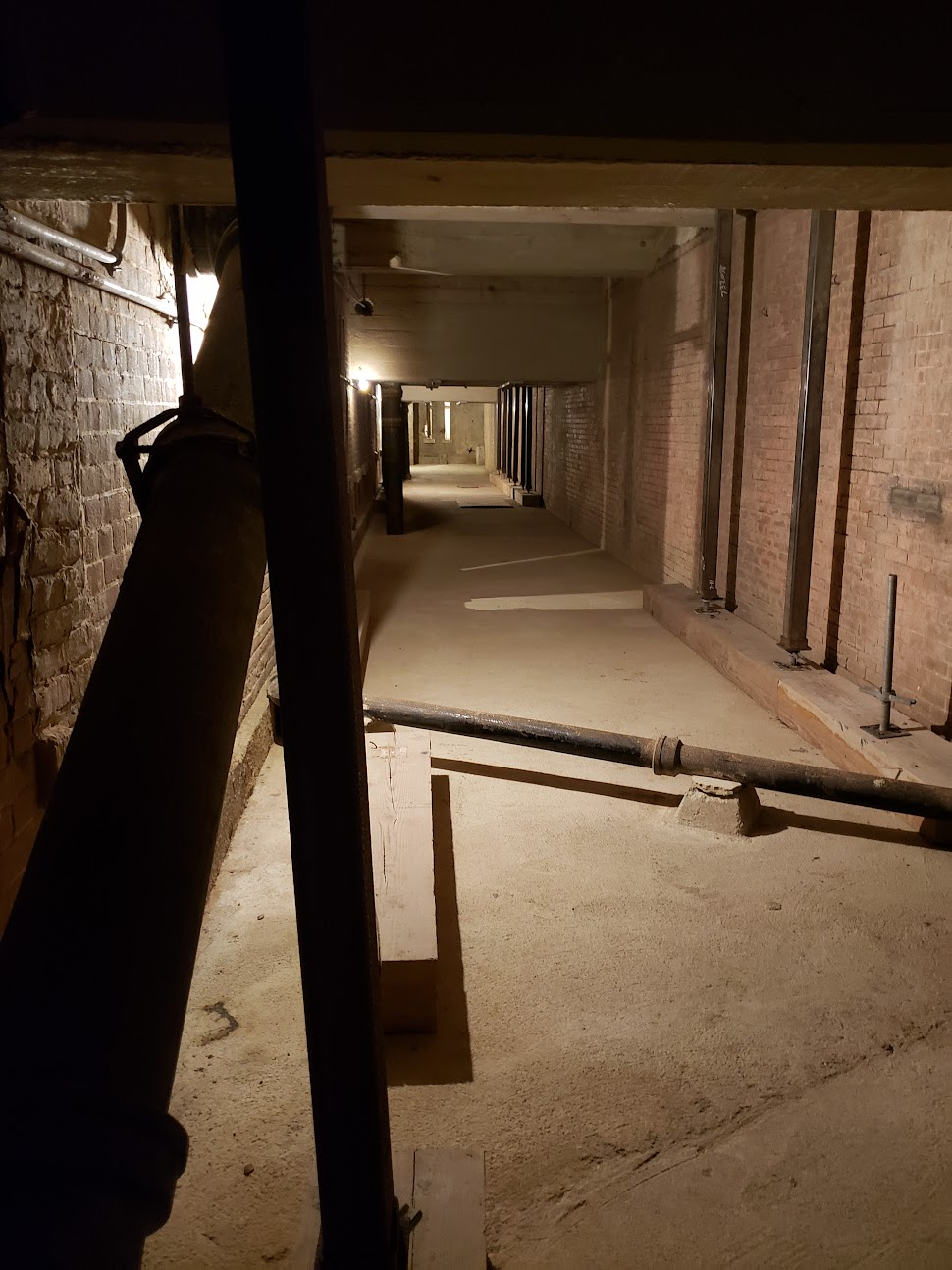
Basement of Alcatraz

== See also ==
- Alligator Alcatraz
- Asinara
- Cellular Jail
- Château d'If
- Devil's Island
- Fort Denison
- List of islands of California
- Nusa Kambangan
- Robben Island
- San Lucas Island
