= Power House (Alcatraz) =

Building in San Francisco, California, US

Coordinates: 37°49′41″N 122°25′28″W

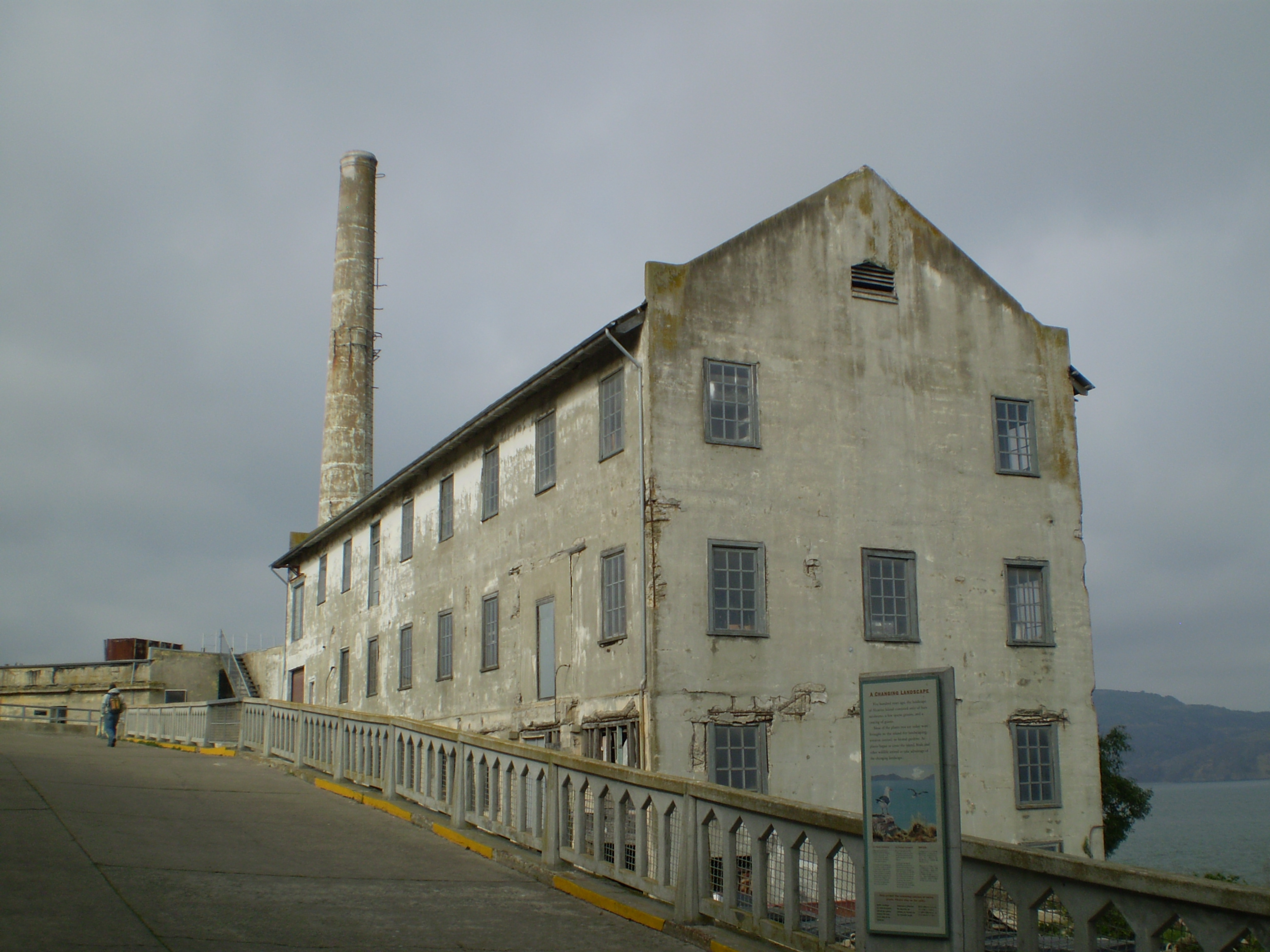
The Power House

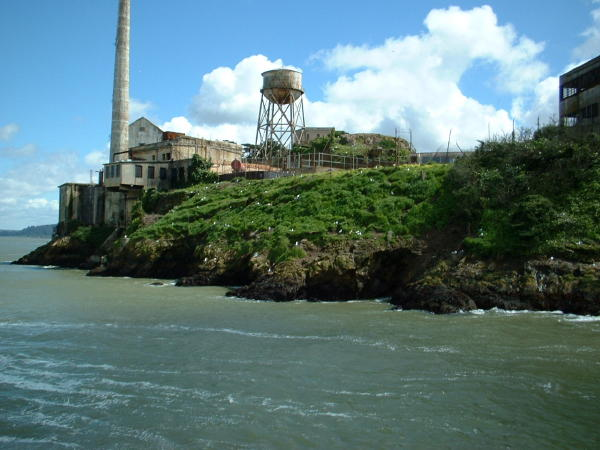
View towards the Power House

The Power House is an electrical supply building on the northwest coast of Alcatraz Island, off the coast of San Francisco, USA. It was constructed in 1939 for $186,000 as part of a $1.1 million modernization scheme which also included the water tower, New Industries Building, officers quarters and remodeling of the D-block. The white powerhouse smokestack and lighthouse were said to give an "appearance of a ship's mast on either side of the island." A "Warning. Keep Off. Only Government permitted within 200 yards" sign lay in front of the powerhouse to deter people landing on the island at the point.

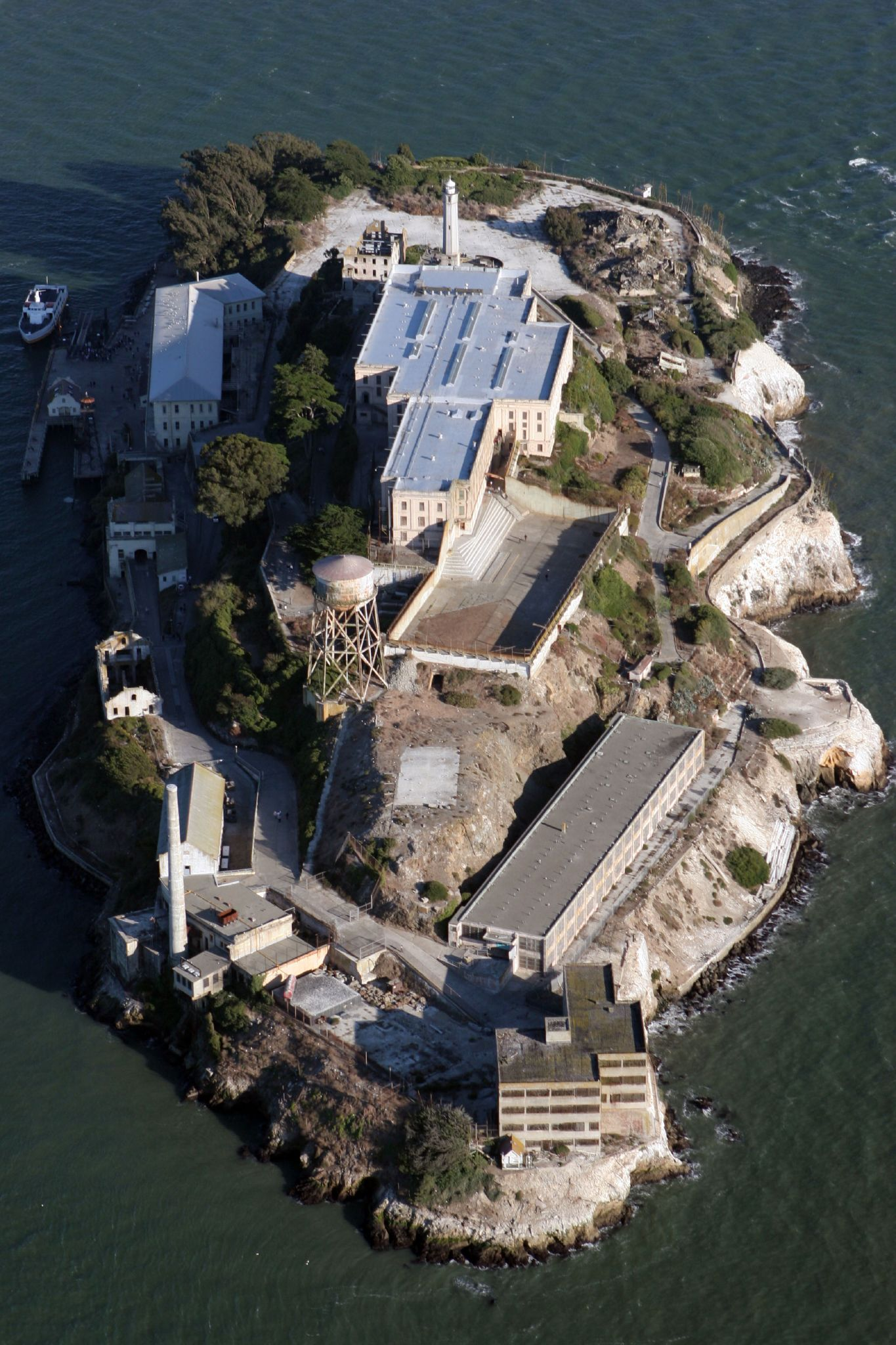
The power house is located on the front left of the picture with the white tower

Between 1939 and 1963 it supplied power to the Federal Penitentiary and other buildings on the island. The powerhouse had a tower duty station which was guarded with a "30-caliber Winchester rifle with 50 rounds of ammunition, a Colt .45 semiautomatic pistol with three seven-round magazines, three gas grenades, and a gas mask."
