= Former Military Chapel (Bachelor Quarters) (Alcatraz Island) =

Building in San Francisco, California, United States

Coordinates: 37°49′38″N 122°25′21″W

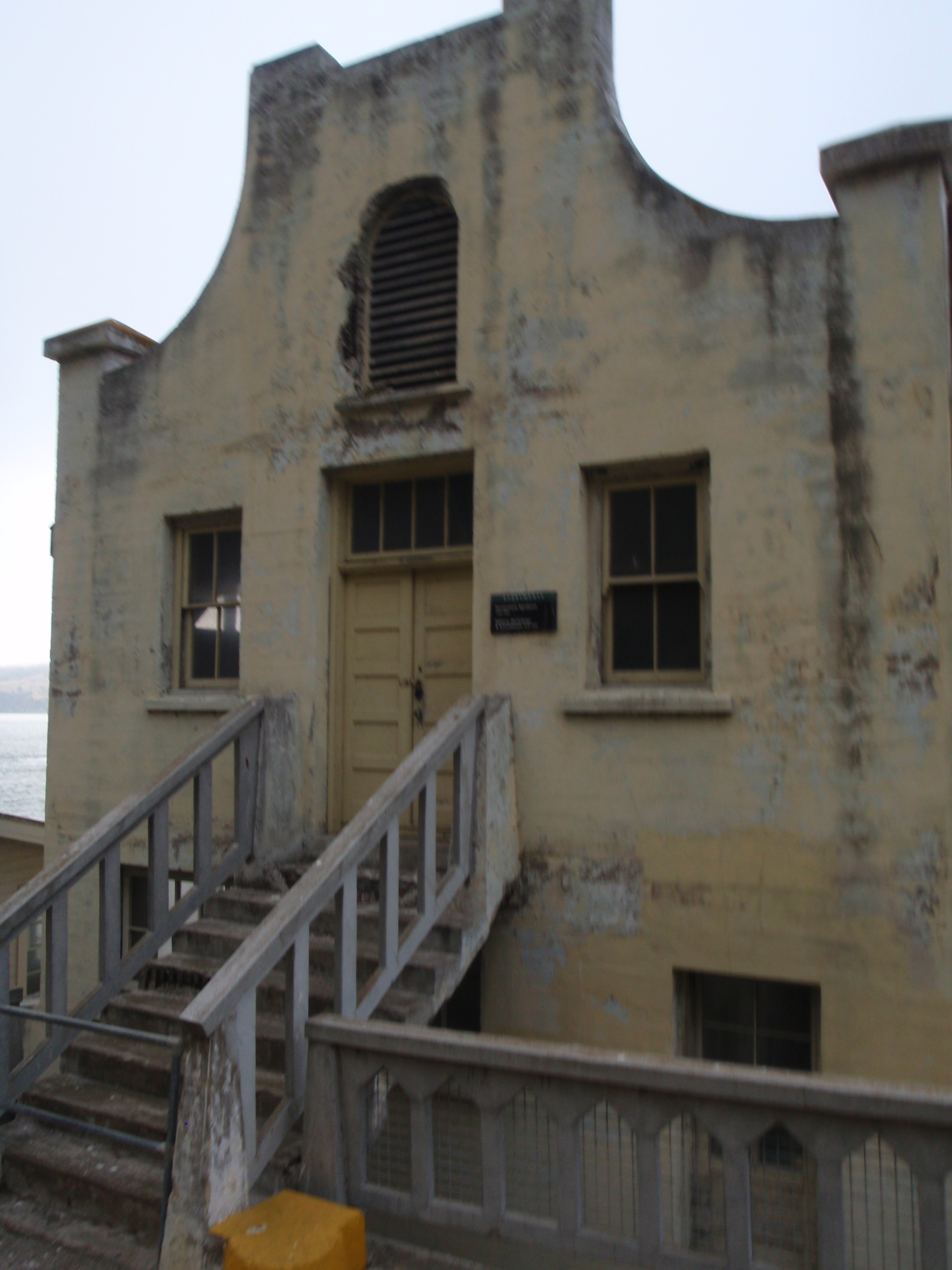
The chapel

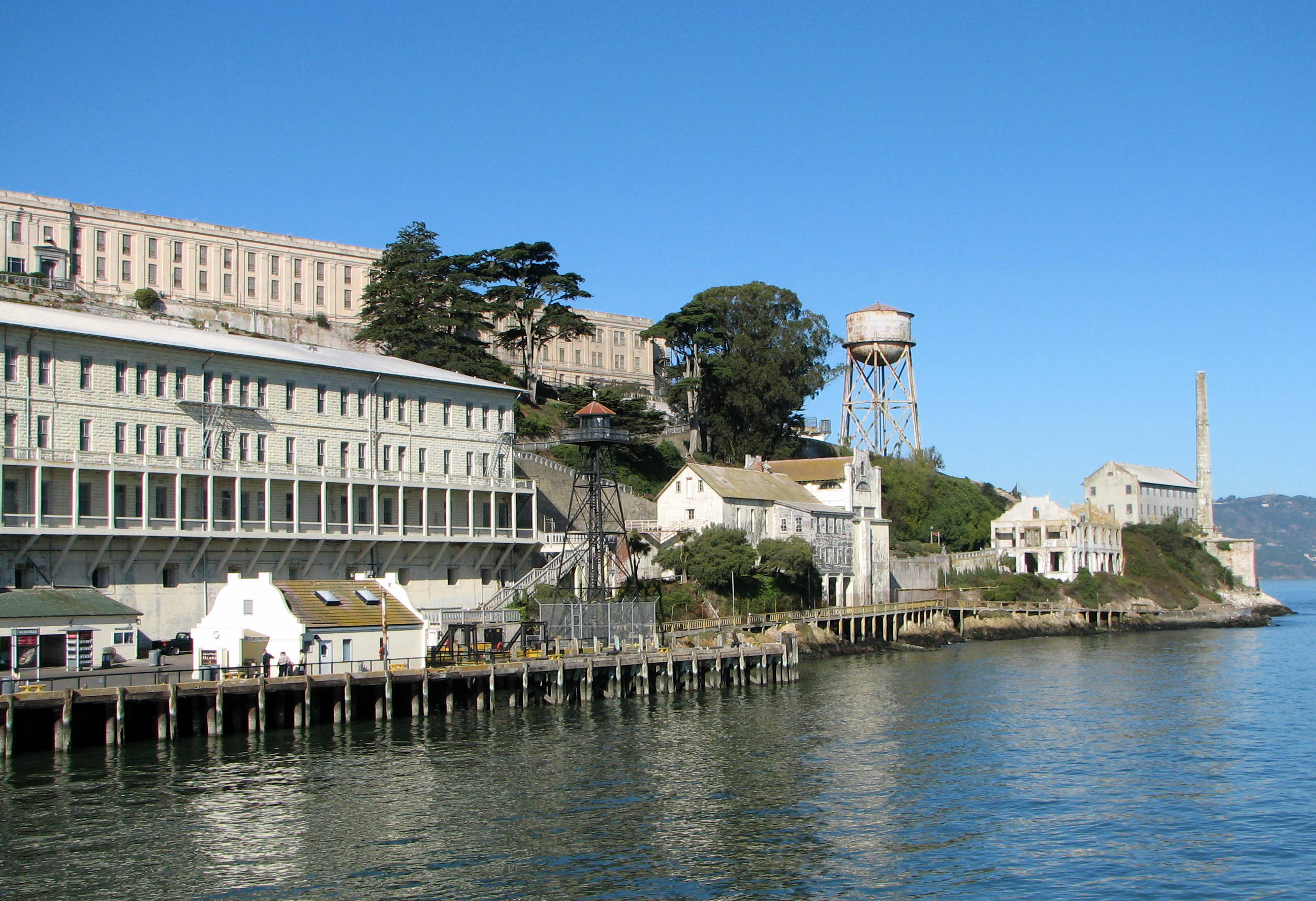
The former chapel can be seen just to the bottom left of the water tower

The Former Military Chapel (Bachelor Quarters) is a building on Alcatraz Island off the coast of San Francisco, United States. It is located next to the Sally Port and Dock and the Building 64 residential apartments. It was built in the 1920s in the mission-revival style to accommodate for the officers at the military prison on the island. The ground floor had quarters for the officers and their families who worked at the military prison and the top floor was used as a school and chapel.

In 1934, when Alcatraz became a Federal Penitentiary, the building was used as a Bachelor Quarters for unmarried officers.
