= Camp Reynolds =

Former WW2 Military Facility in Shenago, Pennsylvania

Coordinates: 41.33805°N 80.39994°W

Camp Reynolds was a World War II United States Army facility from 1942 to '46. Its original name was Shenango Personnel Replacement Depot (commonly referred to as Camp Shenango). On September 21, 1943, it was renamed Camp Reynolds after PA Civil War hero Major General John Fulton Reynolds who was killed on July 1, the first day of the Battle of Gettysburg. The camp was located in Pymatuning & Delaware Township in Mercer County, Pennsylvania.

In 1994, the Pennsylvania Historical & Museum Commission placed a historical marker there to note the historic importance of the location.

== History ==
On June 24, 1942, the United States Department of War announced the authorization and award of contracts totaling more than $3,000,000 for construction of a military installation near Shenango, Pennsylvania to receive, process, and forward both officers and enlisted men for service during World War II. Acquisition of land in Pymatuning Township, Pennsylvania, began almost immediately with cooperative landowners from a total of 26 farms paid an average of $70 per acre for their potato fields. The first parcel of 57 acres was purchased for $40,500 and included space for warehouses. An additional 114 acres were then acquired at a cost of $10,252. By the time land procurement ended in November 1942, 3,300 acres had been acquired at a total cost of $182,000.

Initially, military leaders determined that time spent at the camp by individual members of the military would depend on the demand for replacements and each serviceman's branch of operations. Ultimately, more than a million troops passed through the camp on their way to East Coast ports of embarkation and the war's European theater of operations.

=== Construction phase ===
Upon receiving their contract awards, Gannett, Eastman, Fleming of Harrisburg, and Mellon-Stuart Construction Co. of Pittsburgh designed and built the encampment to last just three years, but also to be unlike any other military depot at the time. Upon completion, it would include barracks for 30,000 troops, chapels, dayrooms, fire stations and hundreds of fire hydrants, guest quarters, gymnasiums and three obstacle courses, a 100-bed hospital, latrines, libraries, mess halls, motor pool, post exchanges, rifle range, service clubs, theaters, and warehouses. The base would also be equipped with its own infrastructure, including more than 100 miles of electric lines, 25 miles of paved roads, 22 miles of water lines, two 250,000-gallon water tanks (painted in a large red-and white checker pattern and situated at the southern end of the encampment), a sewage treatment plant, 18 miles of sewer lines, and a waste disposal facility.

Civil Service examiners began taking applications for immediate employment hires. The project then ramped up quickly as thousands of engineers and construction workers arrived and 4,200 men employed by the main contractors and 24 subcontractors began working 10-hour days and six-day weeks after ground for the first supply building was broken near the overhead highway bridge on Route 18 on July 8. In short order, the War Department ordered the expansion of the camp's battalion area to accommodate an additional 30,000 troops, followed by a subsequent expansion of the camp's housing capacity to 90,000 troops.

Although trailer camps were established to handle the sudden influx of workers and their families, housing facilities were limited. As a result, Greenville's population increased by 60 percent - from 8,149 in 1940 to 13,015 in 1943 (or higher, according to Mellon-Stuart records which showed a workforce high of 16,500 at one point).

Although the final project cost for construction of the entire camp complex was never officially announced, one figure revealed that just one segment of the project (10 dormitory units erected on the west side of Route 18 to provide housing for 180 families) cost $624,466. The cost for the entire camp complex was reported to have topped $19,000,000. Post-war, the ten dormitory units to the west of Route 18 were converted into a county-owned housing project (known today as Fay Terrace) while the 250,000-gallon, red and white water tanks continued to supply water to the area for many years, and helped contribute to the area's housing growth during the 1950s.

1943, and November 30, 1944. Servicemen also made their own fun, organizing baseball, boxing and track and field events, a drum and bugle corps, several dance bands, stage productions, and bowling, handball and basketball leagues with one cage tournament attracting roughly 23 GI teams. Allegheny, Westminster, Geneva, and Bethany Colleges also made exhibition basketball appearances.[5]

Stage, screen and radio headliners also offered troops a break from military life. Among those making appearances at the camp were: Louis Armstrong, Bonnie Baker, Blue Barron, Major Bowes and his Amateur Hour, the Camel Caravan, Stu Erwin and the cast of "Goodnight Ladies", Judy Garland, Benny Goodman, the Harmonic Rascals, Andy Kerr, Wayne King, the Mills Brothers, Olsen and Johnson's "Helzapoppin", June Preisser, Art Rooney, contralto Alice Stewart, Bob Strong, the cast of the "Truth or Consequences" radio show, and Virginia Weidler. Boxers Joe Louis, Sugar Ray Robinson, Two-Ton Tony Galento, and Fritzie Zivic also made appearances, as did billiard experts Irving Crane and Charles Peterson, members of the Pittsburgh Pirates and Cleveland Indians, Governor Edward Martin, and a number of touring OSO shows and amateur theatrical groups from Pittsburgh, Cleveland, Ohio, Youngstown, Ohio, and Sharon, Pennsylvania.

In addition, attractive bus and rail fares enabled many soldiers to travel to Sharon, New Castle, Farrell, Youngstown, and other nearby cities to seek rest and relaxation before their departure overseas, and the United Service Organization (USO) also helped ensure that men were kept busy during their off-du

== Commanders ==
Camps Shenango and Reynolds had six commanders. First to arrive during the very early construction days was Lt. Col. G.H. Sunderman, who came Oct. 1, 1942, and was followed by a quartermaster detachment of seven men from Fort Monroe, VA. On Nov. 4, Lt. Col. George H. Cherrington arrived and was followed by the first components of the headquarters company from New Cumberland, PA. Colonel Zim E. Lawhon took over on May 27, 1943, coming from the general staff of the War Department. It was during Colonel Lawhon's command that the name of the camp was changed from Shenango on September 21, 1943, to Reynolds in honor of General John F. Reynolds, who was a hero of the Civil War and had been felled by a Confederate sharpshooter on the opening day of the Battle of Gettysburg.

After Lawhon's death came Col. George E. Couper, who commanded until Dec. 23 when Brig. Gen. Jesse A. Ladd was designated commander. He served in that capacity until the replacement depot was deactivated to the Indiantown Gap Military Reservation on Dec. 11, 1944. After his departure Camp Reynolds assumed a ghost town appearance.

The last commander was Lt. Co. George Blaney. He took over after the post became the army's first full-time canvas and webbing repair facility. At that time it had a complement of about 300 to man the hospital and to guard the more than 1,000 German prisoners of war. Repatriation of the last prisoners was completed in mid-January 1946.

After the camp's final deactivation the Trimble Company of Pittsburgh was awarded the general contract for razing the hundreds of barracks. The city of Erie acquired 200, Cleveland more than 100, Jamestown, NY 50, Johnstown 50, Connellsville 30, etc. The city of Pittsburgh and several area colleges, among them Thiel, Allegheny, and Westminster, bought additional dozens, as did many individuals seeking to convert them to garages, hunting camps, and other uses. How the many other structures and facilities and the campsite itself were acquired by the Greenville Business Men's Association for future industrial and residential development.

The community, now known as Reynolds, had not one but three names during its wartime history. In 1942 Reynolds came into being as the Shenango Personnel Replacement Depot and was originally named for the nearby village of Shenango. On railroad timetables it bore the Victory, PA designation. Possibly because the original name was somewhat unwieldy, the War Department decreed in July 1943 that the military depot should bear the name of Camp Reynolds in honor of one of the Keystone State's military heroes of the American Civil War. The new designation paid tribute to the memory of Major General John Fulton Reynolds, one of the 51 Union generals ‘who died in battle during the Civil War’. He was killed by a 16-year-old Confederate sharpshooter on July 1, 1863, the first day of the bloody action at Gettysburg. John F. Reynolds was one of the most universally admired officers of the Army of the Potomac. A compassionate man, he was said to be genuinely concerned for the wellbeing of the soldiers under his command.

== German prisoners ==
When World War II began to wind down there were still more than 1,800 German prisoners of war housed in Camp Reynolds barracks. They were among the 15,000-plus German POWS under army control in the Maryland-Pennsylvania-West Virginia area near the war's end. Most of theriticism in some areas. They were assigned to factories and plants in the Shenango Valley, Meadville, Youngstown, and Warren, OH. There is no record of any German soldiers assigned to Greenville shops or plants.

Under terms of the Geneva Convention all of the prisoners with the exception of officers could be made to work as the U.S. Army saw fit. Some worked at logging camps in the area of North East, Kane, Sheffield, and Marienville.

According to John Gessner, who was an Army captain at the time and worked with the Germans on frequent occasions, still other prisoners worked at the Reynolds sewing center after the civilian employees had left for the day.

Now an attorney living in Cortland, OH, Gessner recalled that for the most part the Germans were a docile lot. There was one occasion in November 1945 when it became necessary to place 280 of the POWs on a bread-and-water diet after they staged a sit-down strike because their Nazi spokesman had been shipped out of camp. The strike was short-lived.

A few of the prisoners did attempt to escape from Reynolds but in all instances except one the escapees were caught and returned to camp. One man who got away never was captured.

Perhaps the most notorious of the Reynolds' escapees was a young man named Heinz Golz. He attempted three escapes. He was recaptured the first time near Oil City and on another occasion had to be rescued by police from atop a suburban Pittsburgh dwelling where he had been chased by two dogs. In October 1945 a total of 450 German war prisoners were brought to Reynolds after a detainee camp at North East had been closed. About the same time others held at Kane, Marienville and Sheffield arrived at Reynolds to await repatriation.

Some 500 more were moved out on the 25th day of November, with several hundred more awaiting their turn to depart for their homeland. The army's Center for Military History reported that the total number of prisoners based at Reynolds at the end of the conflict totaled 1,868, including 1,839 enlisted men and 29 non-commissioned officers.

Not long before the last of the prisoners departed several hundred of their number was ushered into a post theater and shown motion picture footage they probably never will forget during the balance of their lives. This first area showing of the U.S. SGerman people were incapable of such atrocities, they said.

The prisoner of war camp, which had been established April 4, 1944, was discontinued Jan, 15, 1946, approximately one month after the closing of the military camp itself.

== The race riot ==
The manner in which many Black soldiers were treated during the early days and months of the Shenango Personnel Replacement Depot (SPRD) operation is a blot the War Department has never been proud of and has always been reluctant to talk about. When the SPRD was conceived during the early phase of World War II, military units were strictly segregated. At the local depot there were separate barracks, post exchanges, theaters and other facilities for white and Black troops. Southern officers and GIs especially did not mix well with the Black soldiers and consequently, the treatment of the African Americans probably was what was considered to be about normal for that period in history. There was no civil rights movement at the time, nor were there marches or demonstrations to advance the cause of the minorities. Some excesses in the treatment of Black troops during the early days of the camp were evident, however. For example, the late Joseph G. Magargee of Greenville, a civilian employee at the camp who later became a Reynolds High School teacher and something of an authority on camp history, once recalled how the first contingent of Black soldiers was not fed at the base but were placed in leg chains and trucked to the nearby Blue Sky Inn for their meals. Magargee wrote that according to the Blue Sky owner the Black troops were not permitted to enter the inn when Southern soldiers were inside. Under military guard, the Black troops were served their meals outdoors on the parking lot.

Before he died a few years back Magargee also mentioned that in the camp's early days there was but a single theater for Black troops although they were permitted to occupy the back row seats in a theater for whites. The only other entertainment originally afforded the Black troops consisted of card games, pick-up baseball and other diversions of their own making.

Ultimately, the ill feelings harbored by some Black and white troops alike eventually flared into a race riot that ended up with a deadly exchange of gunfire lasting several hours.

Area newspapers and radio stations (there was no television in those days) did their level best to get a line on what transpired that mid-July day in 1943. The camp's public relations officials would say only that one Black soldier had been killed and six others wounded in a racial flare-up. This was later described as a "spoon-fed" accounting of the rioting.

The Department of the Army's Center of Military History, in response to a communication from this writer and Congressman Tom Ridge, supplied one version of the flare-up by providing a single page copied from Ulysses Lee's publication titled The Employment of Negro Troops. Lee wrote that not all of the violence and disorder in which Negro troops became involved resulted from racial friction or mass grievances. Much of it was purely indigenous in nature, sometimes growing out of cultural traits and patterns of behavior brought into the Army from Civilian life.

In the Camp Shenango instance, an altercation between Black and white soldiers in the post exchange area expanded until it involved a large number of troops in the exchange area. This first instance, brought under control by white and Black military police using tear gas, was followed by another when two new prisoners, picked up for a pass violation, spread news of the earlier fracas to men in the guardhouse. Black prisoners broke out of the guardhouse and joined by other soldiers, seized firearms and munitions from supply rooms.

Military police, again white and Black, killed one and wounded five other soldiers in quelling the second disturbance. John W. Kerpan, now a Greenville funeral director, was a first lieutenant and second in command of the camp's military police forces at that time of the rioting. He recalls that after several white soldiers went into the 10th Street post exchange for Black soldiers that a number of them retaliated by attempting to enter the white PX on Seventh Street. The Black soldiers were met with stiff resistance. Tempers flared and the resulting melee soon got out of hand. Kerpan's recollection is that at least two Black soldiers were killed and several others probably were wounded in the resulting gunfire which lasted from about 5 o'clock in the afternoon until long after dark. Some of the Black troops disappeared under the cover of darkness but were later picked up in various communities throughout Western Pennsylvania and Eastern Ohio. The rioters were immediately sent to overseas destinations. William F. Kerfoot, Sr., now of the Vernon, OH area, was a military police sergeant who said that he had a "front row seat" during the gunfire display in which not a single military policeman was wounded.

After the rioting, Kerfoot said, he was working in the provost marshal's office and heard that 30 to 35 Black soldiers were killed that day and many more were wounded.

Studs Terkel, the Chicago author who won a general non-fiction Pulitzer prize for his The Good War, an Oral History of World War II, presented still another version of the Camp Shenango rioting after interviewing Dempsey Travis, now a Chicago realtor.

Travis was a 21-year-old Black Army Private when he arrived at Shenango aboard a "Jim Crow train." He told Terkel that on the day of the flare-up he and a friend he knew only as "Kansas" had just emerged from a theater to find a group of Black soldiers engaged in what he described as a "big discussion." He claimed that a caravan of six trucks loaded with white soldiers arrived at the scene and began shooting at the Black soldiers. "Kansas" was killed on the spot, Travis said, and he himself fell with three gunshot wounds in the hip and legs which resulted in several months of hospitalization.

While in the base hospital, Travis claimed he "saw 14 or 15 wounded blacks within a radius of 40 feet." He recalled a Red Cross worker saying that "I don't know how may died and how many were wounded."

He maintained that the hostilities were not completely quelled for 48 to 72 hours. The public may never know for certain how many Black soldiers were killed or wounded that day in July.

Some of the facts about this chapter of the camp's history are now in the public realm and may answer some previously unanswered questions.

== The Conversion ==
Camp Reynolds was converted to its present stature as an industrial-residential community after the war. When the war ended and plans were under way for abandonment of the camp a wide variety of ideas for its post-war use sprang up. Many concerned people wanted to see the land developed rather than watch it revert to potato farms.

The idea of developing an air express terminal was advanced by more than half a dozen Mercer County communities. The site was approved by the Pennsylvania Aeronautics Commission, but the project never got off the ground. Community leaders from Greenville and Sharon, together with other interests from throughout the county, then came up with another idea and attempted to conclude arrangements for the building of a 1,800-bed veteran's hospital. Test borings were made but this effort also came to naught when word came from President Harry S. Truman that the Reynolds site was "unsuitable." The White House directed the Veterans Administration to proceed with plans for development of the veterans’ hospital at Deshon, near Butler.

By this time the War Assets Administration controlled the area for disposition. In 1946 Silas Moss was elected president of the Greenville Business Men's Association (GBMA) and work began in earnest to acquire Camp Reynolds to be developed industrially for the benefit of the entire area. With behind-the-scenes help from Congressman Carroll D. Kearns, many months of work ensued until finally, in the summer of 1947, fifty-seven acres of the camp, including the warehouse area with buildings totaling 251,164 square feet of floor space and some two miles of railroad sidings, were purchased by the GBMA.

The original price the government was asking for the 57 acres was $200,000 but the trustees managed to have the figure reduced to $40,500.

The businessmen sold the Westinghouse Electric Corporation, located in Sharon, the idea of leasing three of the warehouses. They also entered into an agreement whereby lessor would pay the first year's rent in advance and, as a result, the association could be certain of eventually having an additional $30,643 added to the GBMA funds on a three-year lease-purchase agreement.

== Gamble paid off ==
One troublesome problem remained. The association could not charge Westinghouse rent for property it did not own. In order to expedite the collection of the rental from Westinghouse Electric Corporation, three members of the association, Luther Kuder, Norman Mortensen, and Jess Dart, supplied $38,000 from their own resources and $2,500 was allocated and borrowed from the GBMA's post-war fund. The total amount was paid to the War Assets Administration and after a lapse of five months the deed for the property arrived on Oct. 27, 1947. The loans were repaid without interest.

After having rented the balance of the warehouse area to three other firms on three-year lease-purchase arrangements, the trustees turned their attention to additional lands. Another problem was encountered. William Templeton, who owned 258 acres of land in the center of the area, induced many of the former landowners to exercise their priority to re-purchase their land. Then he attempted to buy their land from them. After months of negotiations the trustees were able to purchase all of the land in the area with the exception of that owned by Mr. Templeton. Negotiations with an engineering firm for development of the site already had begun and the land belonging to the association completely surrounded Mr. Templeton's 258 acres with the exception of his property's east boundary. After several more conferences Mr. Templeton offered to sell his property. His offer was accepted and the purchase was made.

After purchasing the area the association trustees and acquired five additional structures with floor space of over 300,000 square feet, over two miles of railroad sidings, about eight miles of paved roads, 639,000 square yards of walks, parking areas and water-bound roads. The purchase price for the land and buildings was $76,629. By the end of 1950, the association had received about $170,000 from rentals and lease-purchase agreements.

There were enough surpluses to allow the trustees to make loans to under-capitalized firms that were attracted to the area. In 1949 there were 10 new industries at Reynolds. During 1950, a total of 61 one-family homes were built and sold within the limits of the area.

The following year the size of the project and the volume of transactions made it impossible for committee members to handle the project on their own. At that time they hired Robert B. Parker, Jr., a graduate engineer who had previously represented an engineering consulting firm not only in the building of Camp Reynolds but as a professional consultant to the committee. In addition to serving as managing engineer for Reynolds Development, Parker became general manager of the water company, the sewage disposal company and the Pymatuning Independent Telephone Company.

Prior to Parker's arrival, operation of the development corporation was under the control of a board of trustees appointed by officers and directors of the Business Men's Association.

== Industrial parks ==
Today there are three industrial parks totaling over 1,200 acres. They are the largest planned and managed industrial developments in the Tri-State area and are located in a metropolitan area of approximately 130,000 persons. The parks are owned and operated by Greenville-Reynolds Development Corporation. The original park consisted of a 430-acre portion of the one-time army training center now occupied by numerous industrial, warehouse, and service-related operations. An additional 40-acre site called the Reynolds North Industrial Park was opened in the late 1980s to meet a demand for smaller, fully developed business sites.

In the early 1990s the corporation acquired and began the development of a new 750-acre tract located east of the Shenango River, known as Reynolds East. The United States Department of Commerce's Economic Development Administration contributed $990,000 to help get the park project off the ground. Over 45 industrial, warehouse, and service related operations are located at Reynolds.

Still other Reynolds firms provided a wide variety of design and building services, warehouse distribution, auto repair and detailing, upholstering, miscellaneous storage, aluminum smelting, structural steel and building erection, metal recovery, hydrous ammonia distribution and technical engineering service to a 30-state area, paving contracting, auction services, telecommunication products and services, general construction, tin mill processing, retail building products, distribution of vinyl and aluminum siding, warehousing, general contracting, and warehouse operations. Also operating under the Reynolds Development umbrella are the Reynolds Water Company and the Reynolds Disposal Company. The original water company had a supply of five million gallons available daily, which was enough to supply a small city.

== Reynolds schools ==
Only one elementary school building was located on the land selected by the government for what eventually was to become Camp Reynolds. It was known as the Rocky View School and was said to be a perfect example of the "little red schoolhouse" type. All but two of the families sending children to Rocky View resided within the confines of the camp area. In the late 1950s Reynolds High School was constructed and graduated its first class in 1961. Reynolds School District embraces 98 square miles. In addition to the junior-senior high building the system includes one elementary building located beside the high school.
