= Fort Alcatraz =

United States Army coastal fortification

Alcatraz Citadel
- San Francisco Bay, California, US
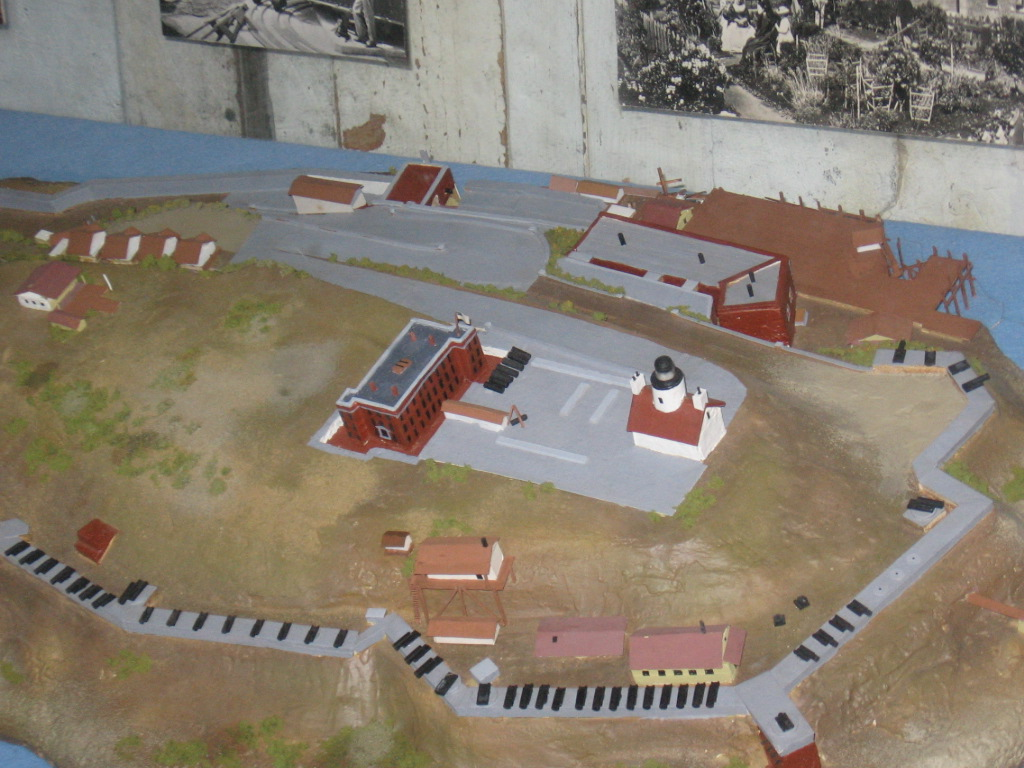
- Model of Alcatraz, 1866–1868

Site information
- Type: Military defense; military prison
- Owner: United States Army
- Controlled by: Golden Gate National Recreation Area
- Open to the public: Yes

Location
- Coordinates: 37°49′36″N 122°25′24″W

Site history
- Built: 1859
- Materials: Masonry, earthworks

Garrison information
- Past commanders: James B. McPherson, Joseph Stewart, William A. Winder

Fort Alcatraz was a United States Army coastal fortification on Alcatraz Island near the mouth of San Francisco Bay in California, part of the Third System of fixed fortifications, although very different from most other Third System works. Initially completed in 1859, it was also used for mustering and training recruits and new units for the Civil War from 1861 and began secondary use as a long-term military prison in 1868.

Major improvements, needed because of changes in artillery, began in the 1870s, but were underfunded and never fully completed, as the post came to be seen less as defense and more as a jail. The site was not used for any major works of the Endicott Board’s plan for the defense of the Bay.

A large concrete prison block was erected between 1910 and 1912. In 1933–1934, this was modernized and became the Alcatraz Federal Penitentiary.

== History ==
=== Early history ===
Native Americans, known as Ohlone (A Miwok Indian word), were the earliest known inhabitants. They gathered bird eggs and other products there, but did not generally permanently live on the island.

=== 19th century ===
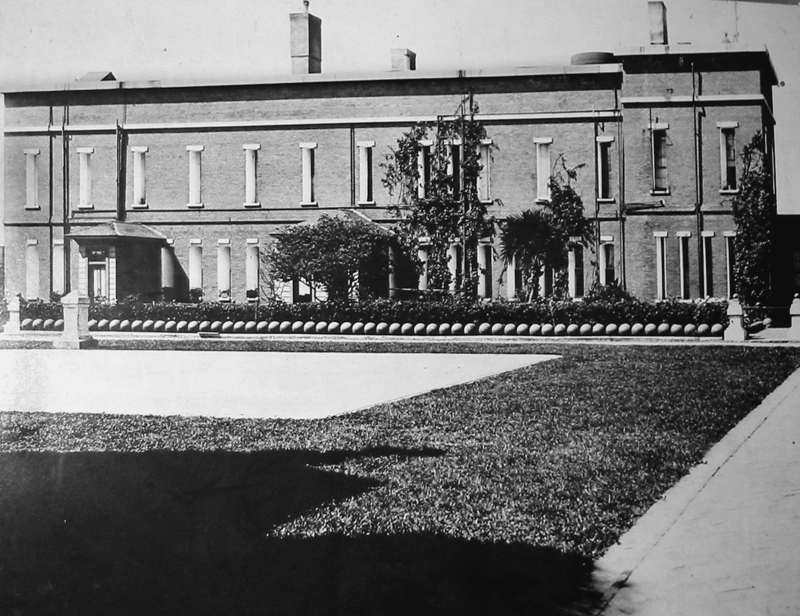
The Alcatraz citadel building, completed in the 1850s and razed in 1909; 1908 photo

The earliest recorded owner of Alcatraz was William Workman, of the Workman-Temple family to whom it was given by Mexican governor Pio Pico in June 1846, with the understanding that Workman would build a lighthouse on it. Workman was co-owner of Rancho La Puente and personal friend of Pio Pico. Later in 1846, acting in his capacity as Military Governor of California, John C. Fremont, champion of Manifest Destiny and leader of the Bear Flag Republic, bought the island for $5,000 in the name of the United States government from Francis Temple.

In 1850, President Millard Fillmore ordered that Alcatraz Island be set aside specifically for military purposes based upon the U.S. acquisition of California from Mexico following the Mexican–American War. Fremont had expected a large compensation for his initiative in purchasing and securing Alcatraz Island for the U.S. government, but the U.S. government later invalidated the sale and paid Fremont nothing. Fremont and his heirs sued for compensation during protracted but unsuccessful legal battles that extended into the 1890s.

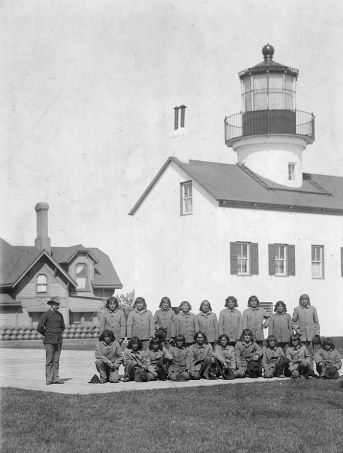
Hopi inmates of Alcatraz citadel

Following the acquisition of California by the United States as a result of the Treaty of Guadalupe Hidalgo which ended the Mexican–American War (1848), and the onset of the California Gold Rush the following year, the U.S. Army began studying Alcatraz Island for coastal batteries to protect the entrance to San Francisco Bay. In 1853, under the direction of Zealous B. Tower, the United States Army Corps of Engineers began fortifying the island, continuing until 1859, at cost of $87,698

The start of construction was a citadel, in this case meaning a lightly fortified barracks, at the top of sandstone rock outcrops. In every other Third System works, such structures are masked from direct fire by more solid fortifications, but not here. The upper part of the island was encircled with walls built of stone and bricks abutting the rock faces, unlike most other Third System works, which laid a heavier hand on the natural landscape. Near the wharf, though, a later sallyport and a fortified barracks showed a more conventional design. A lighthouse was built and 11 cannons were fixed.

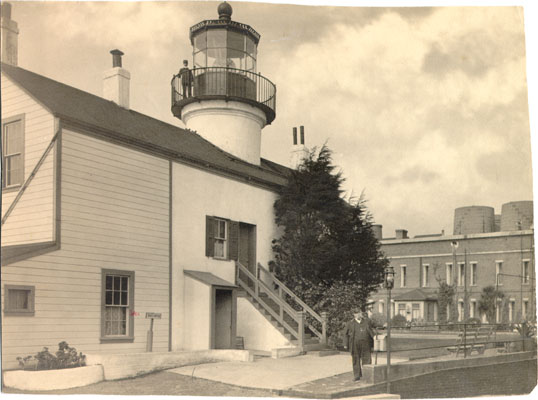
Lighthouse and citadel building, c. 1893

Army engineer James B. McPherson, later to become a prominent general during the Civil War, was one of the earliest commanders to serve on Alcatraz in 1858. In 1859 Captain Joseph Stewart became commander of the active fort.

Alcatraz was used to house soldiers who were guilty of crimes as early as 1859. By 1861, the fort was the military prison for the Department of the Pacific and housed Civil War prisoners of war (POWs) as early as that year. Starting in 1863, the military also held private citizens accused of treason, after the writ of habeas corpus in the United States was suspended.

The number of cells were increased in 1867 and the facility became a long-term military prison in 1868. Alcatraz was crucial to defense during the American Civil War (1861–1865), having some 111 cannons encircling the island at peak, and was also used as a war camp. During the Civil War, the local federal forces had the onerous task of preventing local fighting between the Union and Confederate supporters who were both part of the population of California, and to protect San Francisco.

For example, in 1863, Asbury Harpending outfitted a schooner, the J. M. Chapman as a confederate privateer, intending it to prey on the Pacific Mail ships, which often carried cargoes of precious metals. The plan was interrupted early by the USS Cyane, among others. Consequent to this, more and more were arrested for treason or enemy sympathies. To hold the increased number of prisoners, a temporary makeshift wooden prison was built in 1863 to the north of the guardhouse. In 1864, 15-inch Rodman cannons were added to the fort's armament, and more bombproof barracks built. By end of the Civil War in 1865, there were more than one hundred cannon on the island.

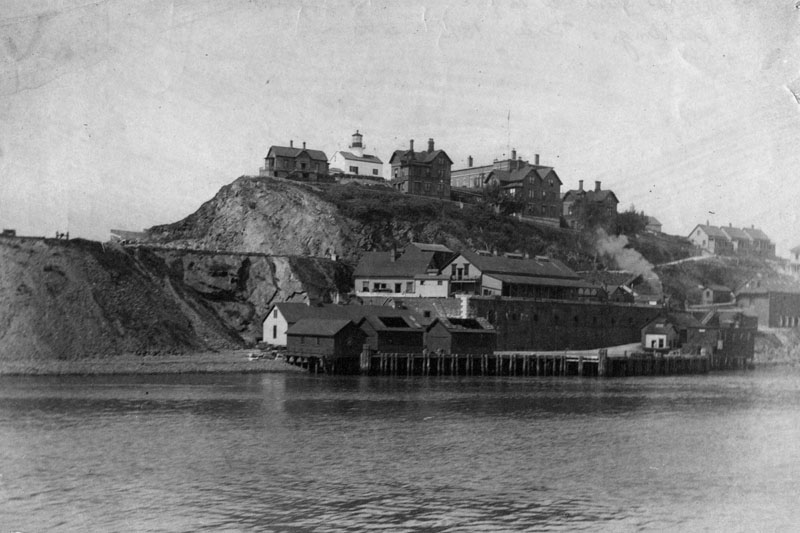
Alcatraz Island, 1895

As the civil war ended, the military prison housed Confederate sympathizers who celebrated Lincoln's death. During the Indian Wars that followed the civil war, Indians who went against the government were sent to the Alcatraz prison. On June 5, 1873, Paiute Tom was the first Native American who was imprisoned there on transfer from Camp McDermit in Nebraska. In the 1870s, Major George Mendell ordered the prisoners, aided by mules, to assist in changing the natural landscape of the island and creating a top level, dumping debris into the coves and bay.

In 1882 the citadel was enlarged to provide more accommodation for the families of the military officers working on Alcatraz. Between 1873 and 1895, 32 Native Americans were imprisoned at the citadel on Alcatraz, including 19 Hopi men held in captivity there between January and August 1895 after being transferred from Fort Defiance.

The island continued to develop in the 1880s and in 1898 the population of Alcatraz increased dramatically from 26 to over 450 due to the Spanish–American War and placed a demand for new buildings. The original barracks evolved into Building 64 in 1905. The first hospital on Alcatraz opened in 1893.

As the number of prisoners to be housed in the citadel increased, more space was built in the form of the Upper Prison, which consisted of three wooden structures, each of two tiers, with the lower prison getting converted as a workshop. However, both Upper and Lower Prison cells, being made of wood, were frequently subject to fire hazards, and this led to change of the structural form of the barracks; concrete structures were built, replacing the wooden ones.

=== 20th century ===
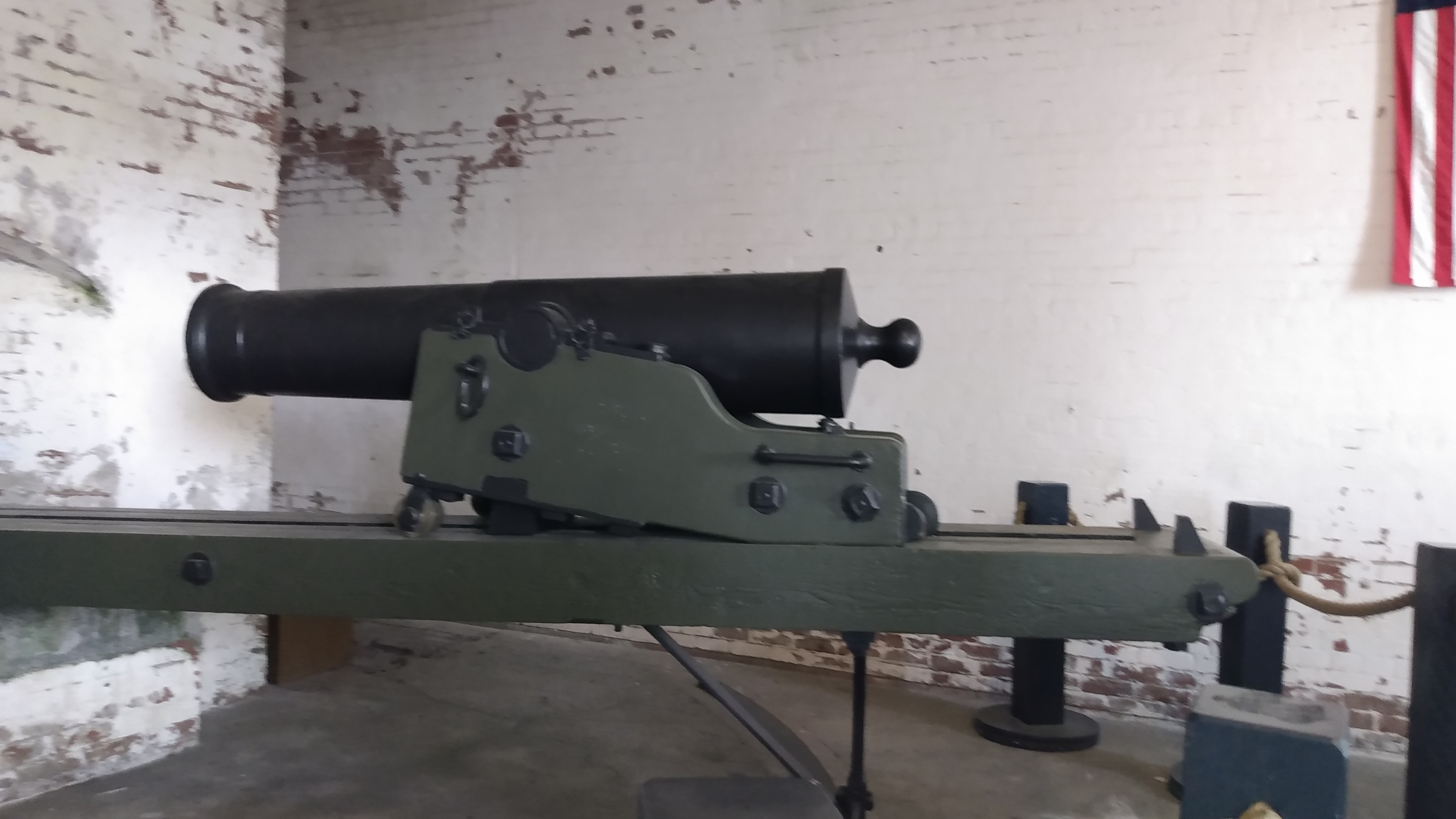
Cannon at the fort

During the Spanish–American War, the number of prisoners increased substantially to 461 by 1902. In 1904, an upper prison building was built at a higher level on the island and replaced the lower prison, with a capacity of 307 inmates.

Alcatraz was renamed as the "Pacific Branch, U.S. Military Prison" in 1907, and as the importance of the Island citadel became less and less obvious due to modernization of the naval facilities, infantry soldiers were shifted and prison guards brought in their place. It developed a reputation for its brutal methods of torturing prisoners.

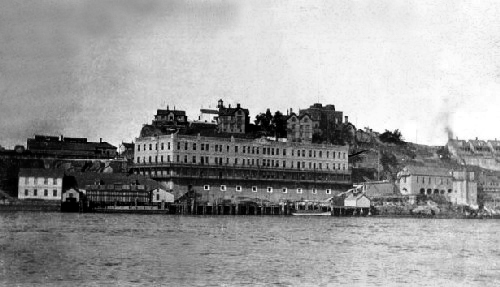
A view of the island and citadel in 1908

Alcatraz was barely affected by the 1906 San Francisco earthquake which devastated the city, and the prison population dramatically increased as prisoners were temporarily transferred to the island due to damage in the city. In 1907, Alcatraz Citadel ceased function as a military defense and became the Pacific Branch, U.S. Military Prison solely. When the original 1860s citadel collapsed in 1908, the Citadel was demolished in 1909 up to its basement over which the new prison was built by the military prisoners between 1909 and 1911 and named as "the Pacific Branch, U.S. Disciplinary Barracks for the U.S. Army," which became popular as "The Rock."

The prison was entirely rebuilt in concrete in 1910–1912 under the command of Colonel Reuben Turner on a $250,000 budget on the site of the remains and short-lived upper prison building. Many of the former tunnels and chambers of the original fort remain today and are still accessible. This building was modernized in 1934 when it reopened as a federal penitentiary, the notorious Alcatraz prison which held America's most ruthless criminals until 1963.

In 1915 Alcatraz was renamed the "Pacific Branch, U.S. Disciplinary Barracks", to indicate that rehabilitation as well as punishment were to be provided. Soldiers with minor offences could be re-trained and returned to the army. As a result, many reformed prisoners returned to active service. Although the facility was a military establishment, it had its fair share of prison escapes. 29 escapes were reported involving 80 convicts out of which 62 were caught and tried while the rest of the prisoners were not traced. In the prison escape of November 28, 1918, there were four prisoners who escaped in rafts, and they were seen at Sutro Forest. However, only one was caught and the others escaped.

==== Transfer to the Justice Department ====
With a small peacetime budget, and a small military, the Army was amenable to transferring the post to the Bureau of Prisons which sought a high-security site to combat prison escapes and prison breaks connected to the Prohibition and Depression-era crime wave.

Modernization of the prison began in October 1933 and Alcatraz Federal Penitentiary opened in August 1934, ending some eighty years of U.S. Army occupation. 32 hardened Army prisoners remained at Alcatraz while the rest were shifted to Fort Leavenworth, Kansas, United States Penitentiary, Atlanta, Fort Jay, New Jersey and several others.

== Architecture and fittings ==
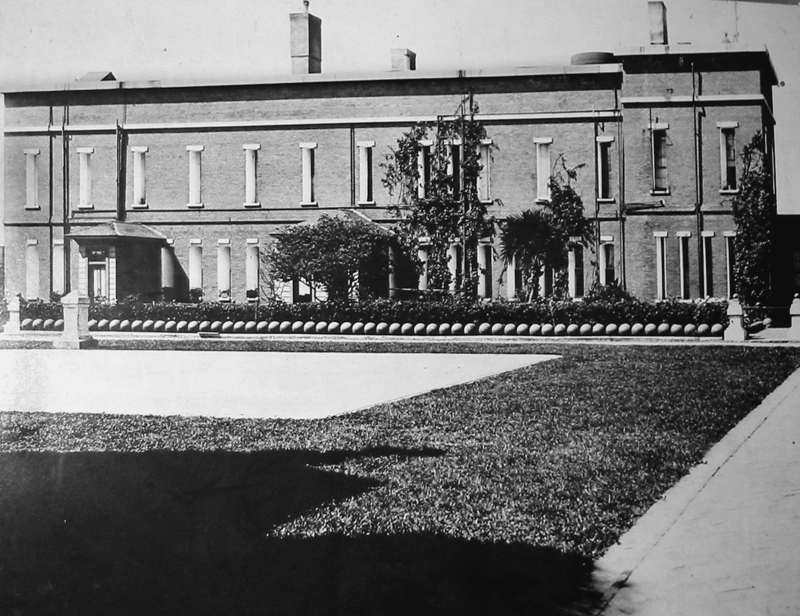
Citadel in 1908

The main mode of transport accessing the island was the General McPherson. Upon embarking at the wharf, the citadel building was reached by going up through the sloping passage behind the sally port, continuing to the top of the island, and crossing a drawbridge over the 12 feet (3.7 m) deep dry moat. It could hold up to 200 men during an emergency and enough supplies to last four months.

Alcatraz Citadel consisted of a basement, which contained the kitchen, bakery, bedrooms, storerooms and jail cells, and two levels above ground which contained the military personnel quarters, servant quarters, parlors and a mess room. In-ground water tanks and water tanks were situated on the roof of the citadel. Other buildings included Batteries Rosecranz and Halleck in the north, the barracks building in the northeast, Battery McClellan and Fog Bell House in the south, Battery McPherson in the west and Batteries Stevens and Mansfield in the northwest and the lighthouse aside the main citadel.

Battery McClellan was equipped with a 15-inch Rodman gun weighing over 25 tons, capable of launching a 330-pound explosive 4,680 yards when angled at 25 degrees. The Parade Grounds were located in the left centre. When the new concrete prison was built in 1910–1912, iron staircases in the interior were retained from the old citadel and massive granite blocks originally used as gun mounts were reused as the wharf's bulkheads and retaining walls.
