= Alcatraz Wharf =

Coordinates: 37.826836°N 122.420825°W

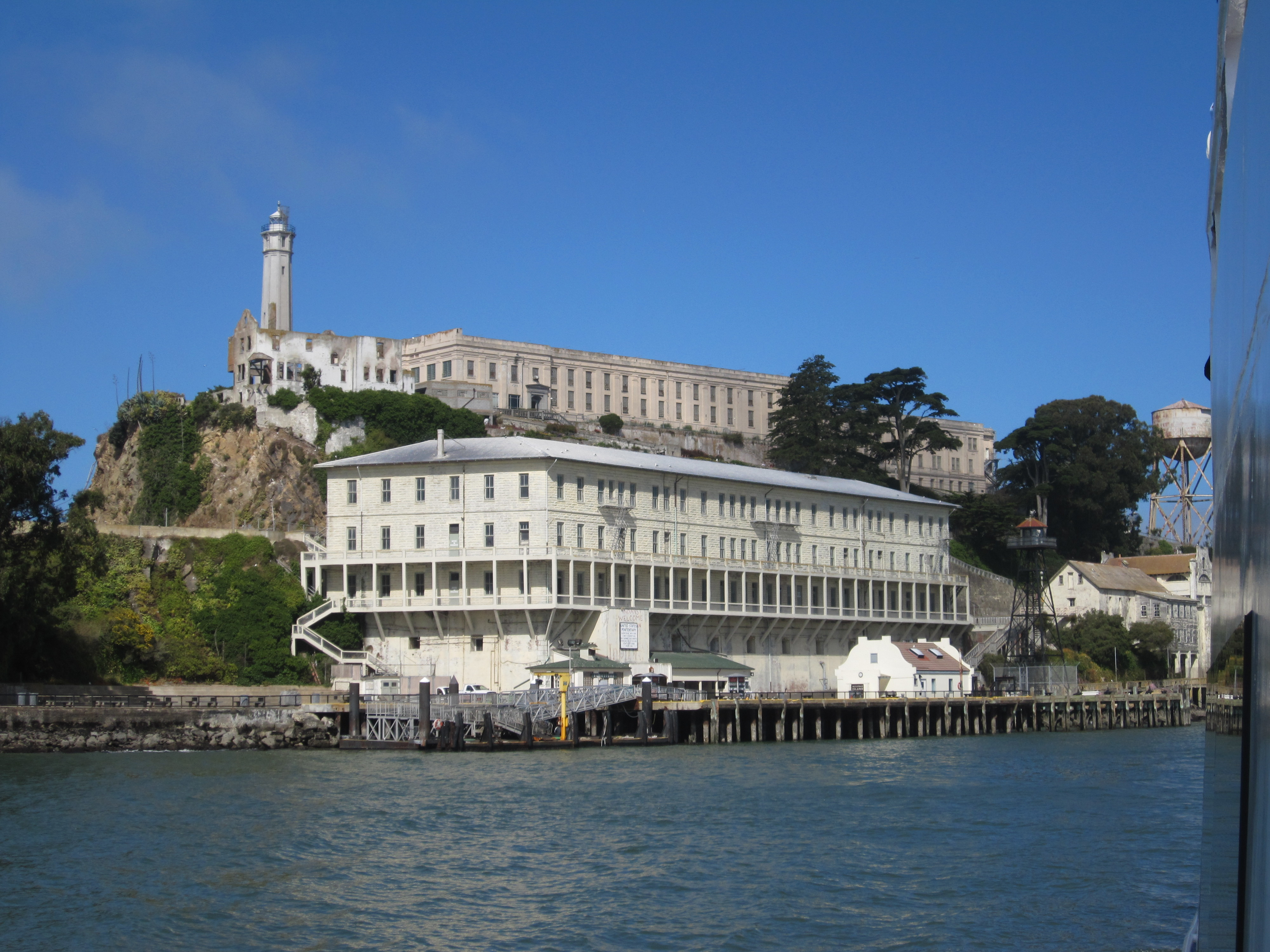
Alcatraz wharf

Alcatraz Wharf is located on the southeast side of Alcatraz Island, in San Francisco Bay, California, US. Classified as building number 33 of the Alcatraz Island National Historic Landmark, its historic name variants were "Alcatraz Dock" and "Alcatraz Pier". It is the main access point to Alcatraz. Another dock on the island's northwest side was only used for rock loading. The wharf contained many of the islands historic buildings, including Building 64 (Alcatraz Defensive Barracks), the Bombproof Barracks, Chinatown, Ranger Office, Garage, Dock Tower, Storage Vault, and Firebox #3.

== History ==
"From the moment a convict sets foot on the Alcatraz wharf, he has, according to the guards, one consuming thought: how to get off." (J. Campbell Bruce, Escape from Alcatraz)

—

The wharf, or boat dock, was established on Alcatraz in the 1850s to permit the landing of men and building materials to construct a fort completed in 1859. In 1867, the General McPherson was built to serve the island and other military institutions in the San Francisco Bay Area, as Alcatraz became a long-term military prison from 1868. The steamer towed officers, prisoners and food and water supplies to island between 1867 and 1886, landing at the dock twice daily before being replaced.

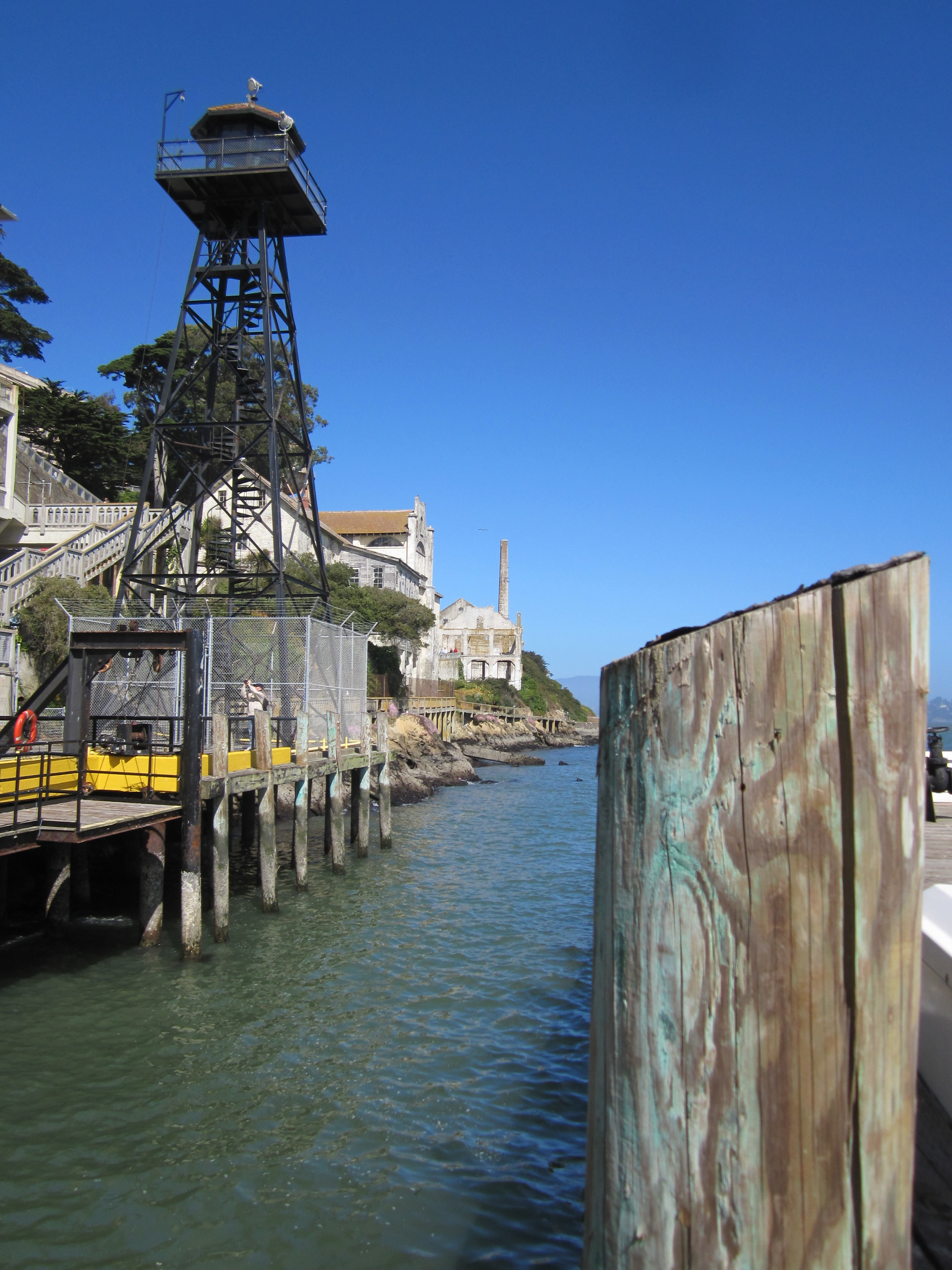

During the time as a federal penitentiary, a prisoner once attempted to escape on a boat from the boat by dressing as an officer. The Sally Port led from the dock to the original citadel on Alcatraz along a walkway, 12 feet (3.7 m) above a dry moat. Today the dock meets visitors to the museum on the island and is served by boat trips daily. Building 64 lies in front of the dock, built in 1905.

In the mid-1880s, work on the wharf area was undertaken to repair it and to create coal sheds and a boathouse. The fort's engine house was located on the wharf. The oil steamer "Rosecrans," owned by the Associated Oil Company, was destroyed by fire above the water line and sank in deep water off the wharf in the early 1910s. Her crew of forty-two men escaped by jumping into the bay and swimming ashore. Additionally, at just 10 years old, David Finney was the youngest person to swim to Alcatraz and back.

Seismic rehabilitation of the wharf occurred in the early 2000s. The retrofit to the existing wharf and its facilities consisted of concrete demolition, excavation, and installation of tiebacks. Reinforced steel and concrete were added to a new deck. Work was also done on the deteriorated piles under the wharf deck.
