= Reynolds School District =

Reynolds School District may refer to:

- Reynolds School District (Oregon)
- Reynolds School District (Pennsylvania)
