= Fredonia, Pennsylvania =

Borough in Pennsylvania, US

- Borough
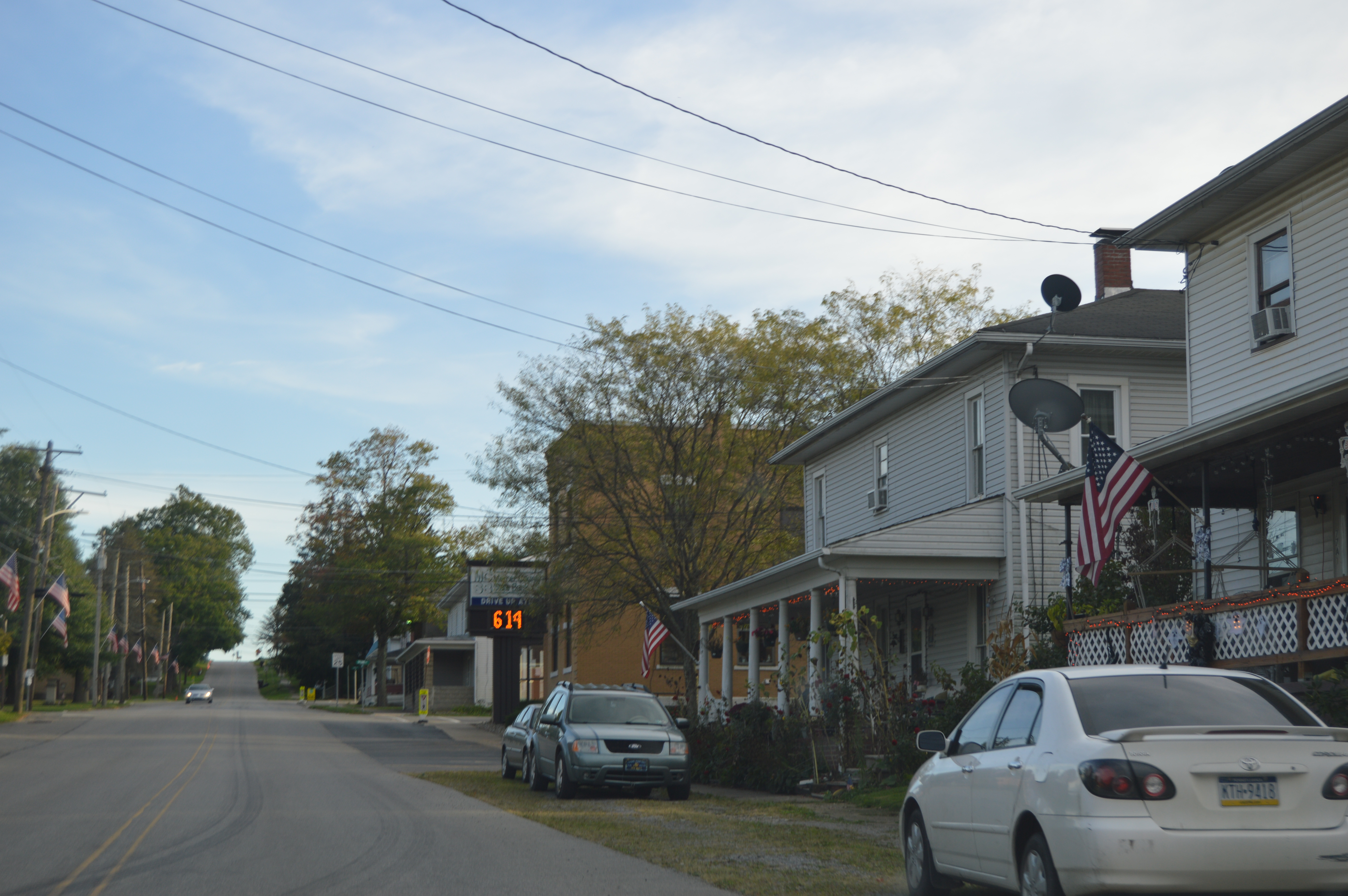
- Main Street

- Location of Fredonia in Mercer County, Pennsylvania.
- Coordinates: 41°19′17″N 80°15′31″W
- Country: United States
- State: Pennsylvania
- County: Mercer
- Established: 1876

Government
  - Mayor: Richard Nagel

Area
  - Total: 0.36 sq mi (0.92 km^{2})
  - Land: 0.36 sq mi (0.92 km^{2})
  - Water: 0 sq mi (0.00 km^{2})
- Elevation (center of town): 1,175 ft (358 m)
- Highest elevation (southwest end of township): 1,280 ft (390 m)
- Lowest elevation (Mill Run): 1,125 ft (343 m)

Population (2020)
  - Total: 436
  - Density: 1,221.3/sq mi (471.54/km^{2})
- Time zone: UTC-4 (EST)
  - Summer (DST): UTC-5 (EDT)
- Zip code: 16124
- Area code: 724
- FIPS code: 42-27688

Fredonia is a borough in central Mercer County, Pennsylvania, United States. The population was 435 at the 2020 census. It is part of the Hermitage micropolitan area.

== History ==
The first resident of the area that became Fredonia was Levi Arnold. Arnold build a grist mill there between 1837 and 1838 and was, over time, joined by several other businesses and residences. William Simmons built the first store in the small village. Based upon the success of his business and the further gains that could be made after the construction of a proposed railroad, Simmons purchased the land that became the borough of Fredonia and had it surveyed and divided into lots. The land came was purchased from two “Donation tracts,” which were tracts of land given to Revolutionary War soldiers in an attempt to encourage them to continue to serve. The name “Fredonia” came from Simmon’s “free” donation of the land for the town square and as a nod to the “Donation” tracts from which the land was purchased. The first post office was established in 1870 and Fredonia was officially incorporated in August 1876. Fredonia was serviced by Bessemer and Lake Erie Railroad passenger trains between 1869 and 1955. The Fredonia Volunteer Fire Department was established in 1934 and has continued to host their “Old Home Week” festival each summer since 1935.

Fredonia was home to the Fredonia Institute, also known as a “normal academy” or “select school.” This higher education institution trained individuals who went on to become physicians, attorneys, teachers, ministers, and enter into other professions. It was incorporated in 1874 and boasted a library established by Andrew Carnegie.

During the Depression, the borough applied for and received Works Progress Administration funds. The funds were used to pave streets and construct a water system to provide water service to the town that had previously relied on streams, individual wells, and cisterns. The WPA also provided workers who helped construct Fredonia-Delaware High School. This stone building was built in 1942 on Delaware Road and served first as a high school until 1960 when it began to be used as an elementary school within Reynolds School District. The elementary school was closed by the district in the mid-1990s, and the building was subsequently purchased and converted into a personal care and independent living facility.

Since the 1940s, Fredonia has also been home to a diner created from a trolley car. The trolley car came from the Harmony Line of the interurban trolley line that ran from New Castle, PA to Pittsburgh, PA. Ownership has changed several times, but the diner is still currently open at its original location.

Fredonia is also home to Pennsylvania’s largest Swiss cheese manufacturer. Fairview Swiss Cheese, which opened in 1955, is operated by John Koller and Son Inc. The company produces over 7 million pounds of Swiss cheese each year.

== Geography ==
Fredonia is located at 41°19′17″N 80°15′31″W (41.321460, -80.258563).

Fredonia is also the proven geographic center of Mercer County, Pennsylvania. A brass placard denoting the spot is located on the premises of "Fredonia Stainless Exhaust", at the southwestern corner of Main and 1st Streets. According to the United States Census Bureau, the borough has a total area of 0.4 square miles (1.0 km^{2}), all land.

== Demographics ==
Historical population
Census	Pop.	Note	%±
1880	323		—
1890	429		32.8%
1900	437		1.9%
1910	443		1.4%
1920	422		−4.7%
1930	476		12.8%
1940	536		12.6%
1950	588		9.7%
1960	657		11.7%
1970	731		11.3%
1980	712		−2.6%
1990	683		−4.1%
2000	652		−4.5%
2010	502		−23.0%
2020	436		−13.1%
2021 (est.)	431	▼	−1.1%

As of the census of 2000, there were 652 people, 252 households, and 184 families residing in the borough. The population density was 1,641.3 inhabitants per square mile (633.7/km^{2}). There were 272 housing units at an average density of 684.7 per square mile (264.4/km^{2}). The racial makeup of the borough was 99.69% White, 0.15% Asian, and 0.15% from two or more races. Hispanic or Latino of any race were 0.31% of the population.

There were 252 households, out of which 34.5% had children under the age of 18 living with them, 56.0% were married couples living together, 12.3% had a female householder with no husband present, and 26.6% were non-families. 23.0% of all households were made up of individuals, and 9.5% had someone living alone who was 65 years of age or older. The average household size was 2.59 and the average family size was 3.03.

In the borough the population was spread out, with 27.6% under the age of 18, 9.2% from 18 to 24, 26.7% from 25 to 44, 23.6% from 45 to 64, and 12.9% who were 65 years of age or older. The median age was 36 years. For every 100 females there were 96.4 males. For every 100 females age 18 and over, there were 87.3 males.

The median income for a household in the borough was $37,917, and the median income for a family was $39,643. Males had a median income of $32,857 versus $19,500 for females. The per capita income for the borough was $14,233. About 17.6% of families and 19.2% of the population were below the poverty line, including 35.6% of those under age 18 and 13.2% of those age 65 or over.
