= Reynolds School District (Pennsylvania) =

School district in Pennsylvania

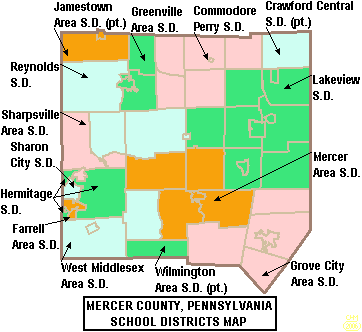

Address
- 531 Reynolds Road Greenville, Mercer County, Pennsylvania, 16125-8804; United States

District information
- Type: Public

Other information
- Website: www.reynolds.k12.pa.us

The Reynolds School District is a rural, public school district serving parts of Mercer County, Pennsylvania. Reynolds School District encompasses approximately 88 square miles (230 km^{2}) encompassing the communities of Fredonia, West Salem Township, Delaware Township, and Pymatuning Township. The western border of the district is part of the Pennsylvania - Ohio border. According to 2000 federal census data, it served a resident population of 10,158. By 2010, the district's population declined to 9,611 people. It is built on what was once a military camp during World War II, Camp Reynolds. In 2009, the district residents' per capita income was $16,380 while the median family income was $42,200. In the Commonwealth, the median family income was $49,501 and the United States median family income was $49,445, in 2010.

Reynolds School District operates two schools: Reynolds Elementary School and Reynolds Junior/Senior High School.

== Extracurriculars ==
Reynolds School District offers a variety of clubs, activities and an extensive sports program.

=== Sports ===
The District funds:

Boys

- Baseball - AA
- Basketball- A
- Cross Country - A
- Football Varsity and JV teams - A
- Golf - AA
- Track and Field - AA
- Wrestling - AA

Girls

- Basketball - A
- Cross Country - A
- Golf - AA
- Softball - A
- Track and Field - AA
- Volleyball - A

Junior High School Sports

Boys

- Basketball
- Cross Country
- Football
- Track and Field
- Wrestling

Girls

- Basketball
- Cross Country
- Track and Field
- Volleyball

According to PIAA directory July 2013

In the year 2020, the Reynolds Jr/Sr High School Football team made it to the State Championships. Their best record in 2020 was 10-0-0.
