= New Hamburg Historical Area =

Historic district in Pennsylvania, United States

- U.S. National Register of Historic Places
- U.S. Historic district
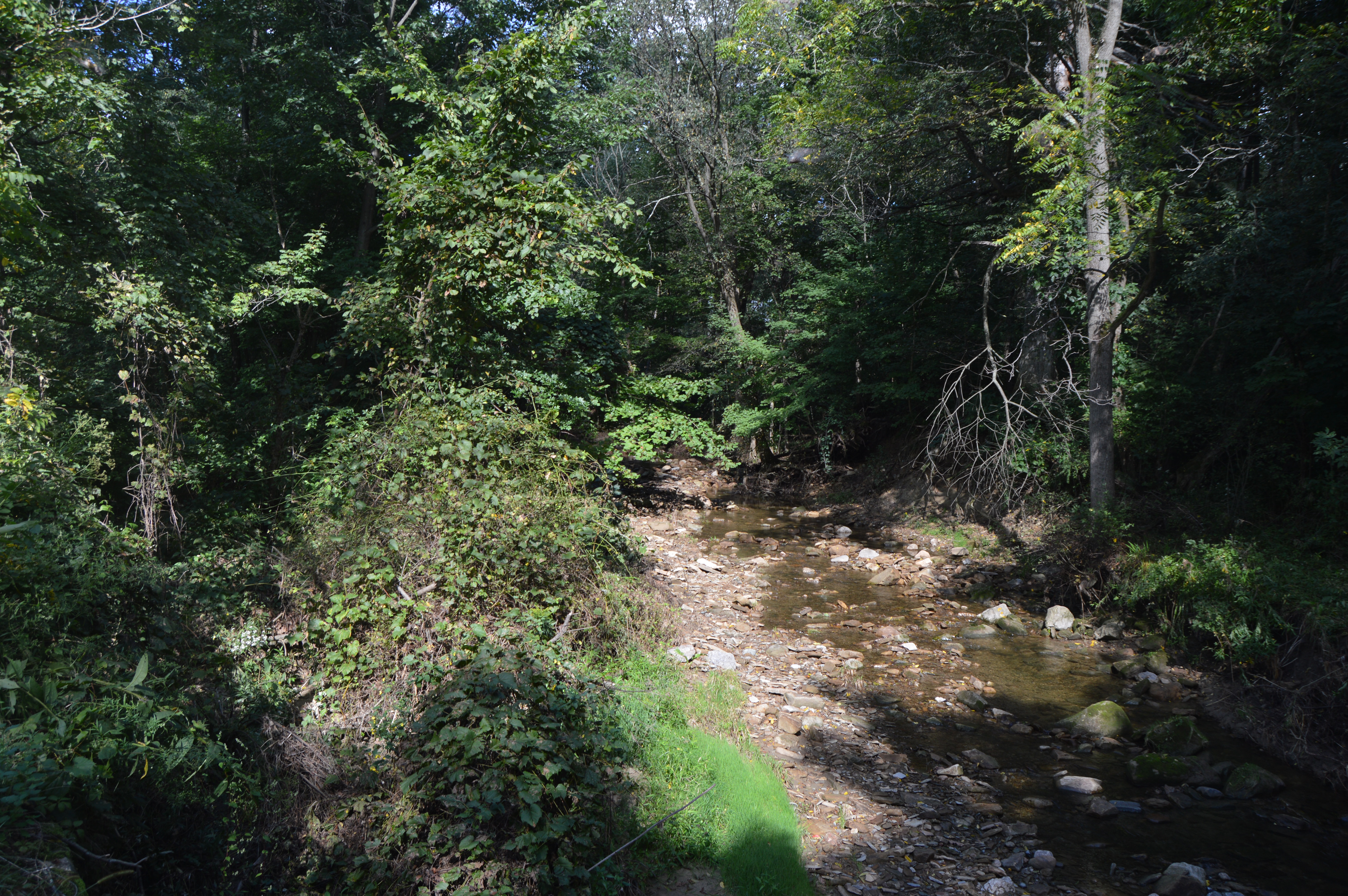
- Wooded land in the district

- Location within Pennsylvania Location within the United States
- Location: 7 miles south of Greenville off Pennsylvania Route 58, Delaware Township, Pennsylvania
- Coordinates: 41°19′14″N 80°20′17″W
- Area: 159 acres (64 ha)
- Built: 1834
- NRHP reference No.: 74001794
- Added to NRHP: December 2, 1974

The New Hamburg Historical Area is a national historic district located at Delaware Township, Mercer County, Pennsylvania.

It was added to the National Register of Historic Places in 1974.

== History and notable features ==
This district includes one contributing building, four contributing sites, and one contributing structure. It includes the site of the Hamburg Iron Furnace (1846), railroad bed, Shenango Division of the Erie Extension Canal loading bay, grist mill and millrace, remains of canal lock and towpath, and canal official's dwelling.
