= List of Pennsylvania state historical markers in Mercer County =

Location of Mercer County in Pennsylvania

This is a list of the Pennsylvania state historical markers in Mercer County.

This is intended to be a complete list of the official state historical markers placed in Mercer County, Pennsylvania by the Pennsylvania Historical and Museum Commission (PHMC). The locations of the historical markers, as well as the latitude and longitude coordinates as provided by the PHMC's database, are included below when available. There are 19 historical markers located in Mercer County.

== Historical markers ==
Marker title	Image	Date dedicated	Location	Marker type	Topics
Albert Bushnell Hart		April 30, 1948	S side PA 258 at PA 18, across from Tara restaurant, just N of Sharpsville; 41.28335°N 80.42853°W	Roadside	Education, Professions & Vocations
Bigler Graves		November 12, 1946	PA 58 (628 Mercer Rd.) at Salem Rd., SE of Greenville; 41.36298°N 80.35499°W	Roadside	Government & Politics, Government & Politics 19th Century, Governors
Bigler Home		November 12, 1946	Pa. 58 SE of Greenville (MISSING)	Roadside	Government & Politics, Government & Politics 19th Century, Governors
Camp Reynolds		September 1, 1994	Rte. 18 S of Greenville (MISSING)	Roadside	Military, Military Post-Civil War
Clay Furnace		January 20, 1949	N side of US 62 at Clay Furnace Rd., W of Charleston; 41.23742°N 80.38486°W	Roadside	Business & Industry, Coal, Furnaces, Iron
Erie Extension Canal		April 30, 1948	Wasser Bridge Rd. (SR 4003) just E of Pa. 18, S of Greenville (Missing)	Roadside	Canals, Environment, Navigation, Transportation
Erie Extension Canal		November 12, 1946	PA 18 & 518 (Lamar Rd.), Lamonts Corners, east of Sharpsville; 41.25722°N 80.45276°W	Roadside	Canals, Navigation, Transportation
Erie Extension Canal		November 12, 1947	Wasser Bridge Road, .3 mile E of Pa. 18, S of Greenville (Missing)	Roadside	Canals, Environment, Navigation, Transportation
Freedom Road		August 23, 1948	US 62, across from Great Stoneboro Fair, SW of Sandy Lake; 41.33535°N 80.09734°W	Roadside	African American, Underground Railroad, Women
General Hugh Mercer - PLAQUE		n/a	N Diamond St., N side of Co. courthouse, right column support, Mercer; 41.22717°N 80.23911°W	Plaque	American Revolution, Forts, French & Indian War, Military
James Sheakley		March 6, 1967	E side of US 19, across from church, N end of Sheakleyville; 40.44521°N 79.98542°W	Roadside	Government & Politics, Government & Politics 19th Century
Johnston Tavern		August 24, 1948	US 19 (across from 1561 Perry Hwy.), near Dydek's Lane, N of Leesburg; 41.14998°N 80.22333°W	Roadside	Buildings, Business & Industry, Inns & Taverns
Kidd's Mill Covered Bridge		July 15, 1995	SR 4012 at Kidd's Mill Rd. (Kidd's Mill State Park), 5 miles S of Greenville; 41.35481°N 80.39709°W	Roadside	Bridges, Transportation
Mercer County		May 12, 1983	N Diamond St. at N side of Co courthouse, at Courthouse Square, Mercer; 40.44521°N 79.98542°W	City	Government & Politics, Government & Politics 19th Century
Pennsylvania		n/a	S side of Tamarack Dr. (Rt. 718), Five Points, NW of Sharpsville, at state line 41.31065°N 80.5181°W	Roadside	Early Settlement, Government & Politics, Government & Politics 17th Century, William Penn
Pennsylvania		January 1, 1948	SR 358 (Vernon Rd.) at state line, ~3 miles W of Maysville; 41.38729°N 80.51867°W	Roadside	Government & Politics 17th Century, Government & Politics 18th Century, William Penn
Pymatuning		November 12, 1946	Pa. 258 E of Clark (Missing)	Roadside	Early Settlement, Native American
Pymatuning		November 12, 1946	Pa. 258 E of Clark (Missing)	Roadside	Early Settlement, Native American
Shenango Town		March 14, 1947	Pa. 118 SE of West Middlesex (Missing)	Roadside	Cities & Towns, Early Settlement, Native American

== See also ==
- List of Pennsylvania state historical markers
- National Register of Historic Places listings in Mercer County, Pennsylvania
