= Kidd's Mills Covered Bridge Historic District =

Historic district in Pennsylvania, United States

- U.S. National Register of Historic Places
- U.S. Historic district
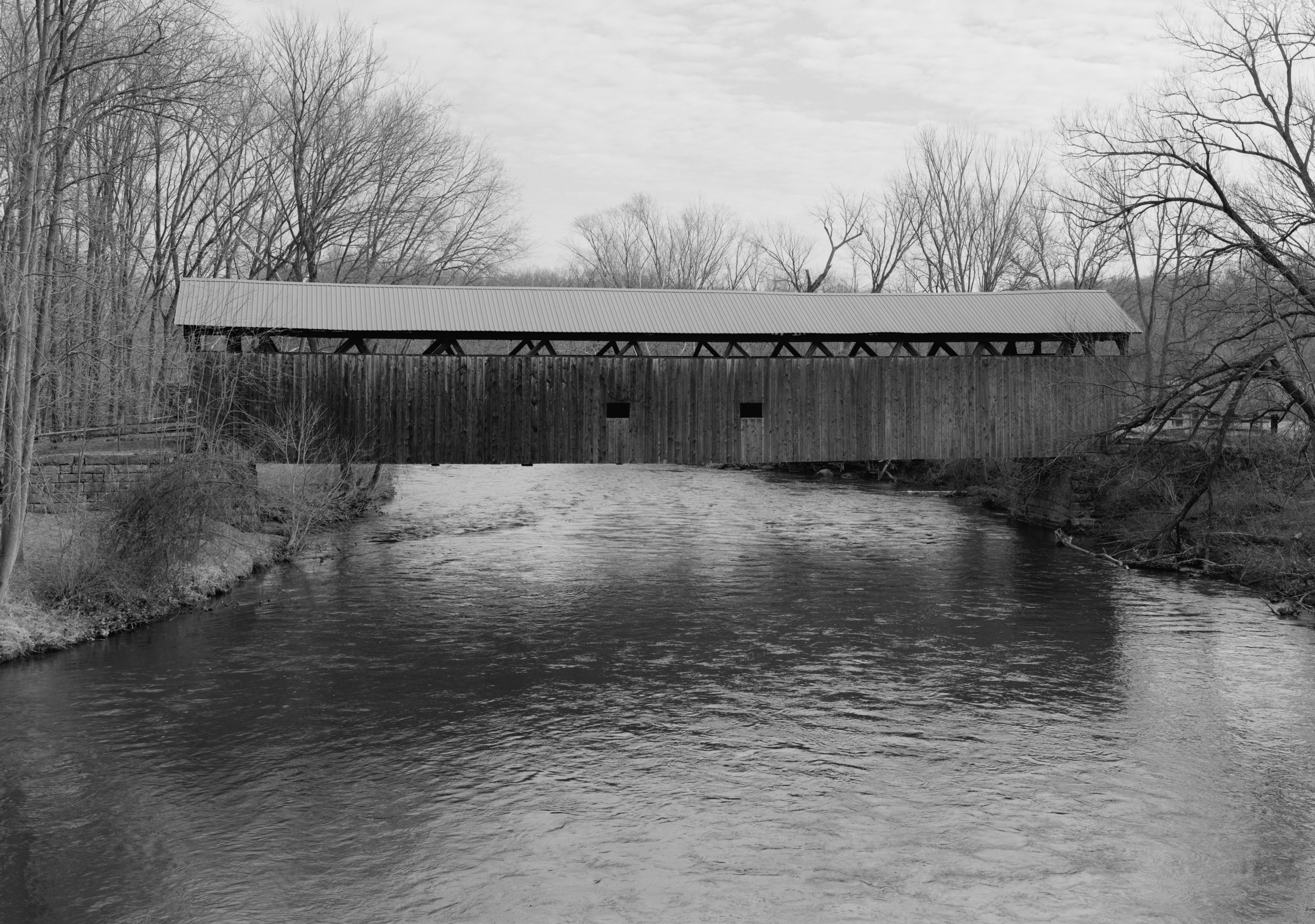
- Kidd's Mills Covered Bridge, 2006

- Location within Pennsylvania Location within the United States
- Location: 5 miles (8.0 km) south of Greenville off Pennsylvania Route 58, Pymatuning Township, Pennsylvania
- Coordinates: 41°21′15″N 80°23′48″W
- Area: 33 acres (13 ha)
- Built: 1868
- Architectural style: Smith Cross Truss
- NRHP reference No.: 74001793
- Added to NRHP: December 2, 1974

The Kidd's Mills Covered Bridge Historic District is a national historic district that is located in Pymatuning Township, Mercer County, Pennsylvania.

It was added to the National Register of Historic Places in 1974.

== History and architectural features ==
This district includes two contributing sites and one contributing structure. The Kidd's Mills Covered Bridge is an historic wooden covered bridge that was built in 1868. It is a rare example of a Smith Cross Truss bridge in the eastern United States. The district also includes the sites of two grist mills.

== See also ==
- List of bridges documented by the Historic American Engineering Record in Pennsylvania
