= General McPherson (ship) =

United States military ship

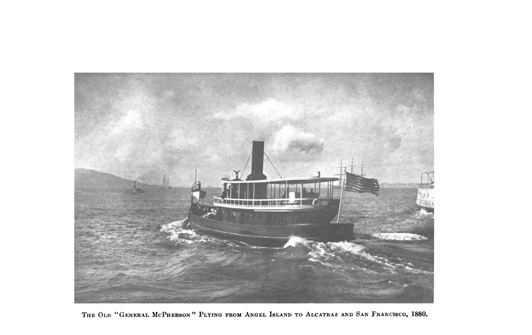
- General McPherson in 1880

History
- Owner: War Department
- Operator: Quartermaster Corps
- Route: San Francisco Bay
- Cost: $40,000
- Acquired: September 1, 1867
- In service: September 1, 1867
- Out of service: March 31, 1887
- Fate: Sold at auction to Williams Diamond & Co., San Francisco for $7,755.

General characteristics
- Tonnage: 104.23 tons (measurement method unstated)

The General McPherson was a ship used by the U.S. military as a transport between military installations in the San Francisco Bay area. Named after Union General James Birdseye McPherson, a prominent figure in the American Civil War. The ship was the main mode of transport to Alcatraz Island during its function as a military defense and war camp after the ship was built in 1867. In addition to people is also carried military supplies and water. A time schedule dated 1885 shows that it traveled between San Francisco, Fort Mason, the Presidio, Alcatraz Island and Angel Island twice a day and took 20 minutes to travel between Camp Reynolds and Washington Street Wharf.

The vessel was purchased by the War Department, Quartermaster Corps on September 1, 1867, for $40,000. It was described as a "steam-propeller" vessel distinguishing its propulsion from the then common side and stern paddle wheel steamers. The Quartermaster steamer was docked at Pier 7, Pacific Street Wharf. It was a small boat, reportedly "not much larger than a tug". The official registry of United States personnel and assets of July 1887 shows the vessel at 104.23 tons (measurement unstated) but gives no other dimensions. (Note: Dimensions are indicated by those given for the "new and larger steamer", General McDowell, of steel construction to replace General McPherson. General McDowell was 124.75 ft (38.0 m) extreme length, 118.5 ft (36.1 m) on waterline, and 23.75 ft (7.2 m) molded beam.) Unlike other vessels of the Corps, General McPherson and a much smaller vessel named Dispatch are shown as "Serviceable" rather than in good condition.

On February 2, 1869, the vessel was badly damaged following an accidental collision with the British ship Duke of Edinburgh. It was repaired and continued activities until 1886. On November 2, 1886, the vessel was disabled by a broken propeller. For years the vessel had been reported as worn out and even unsafe. On June 16, 1885, the commanding general of the Division of the Pacific had warned the Secretary of War of "some great disaster, involving the loss of many lives, may occur with further delay" in replacing the vessel. The replacement, General McDowell, (Note: The Quartermaster's report notes this vessel was being built at Union Iron Works, San Francisco, at a cost of $56,150.) was not delivered on time so that General McPherson continued in service until delivery of the General McDowell November 17, 1886.

General McPherson and all property aboard was advertised for sale and subsequently sold on March 31, 1887, to the Williams Diamond & Co., San Francisco for $7,755.
