= Building 64 =

First building constructed on Alcatraz

Coordinates: 37°49′36″N 122°25′18″W

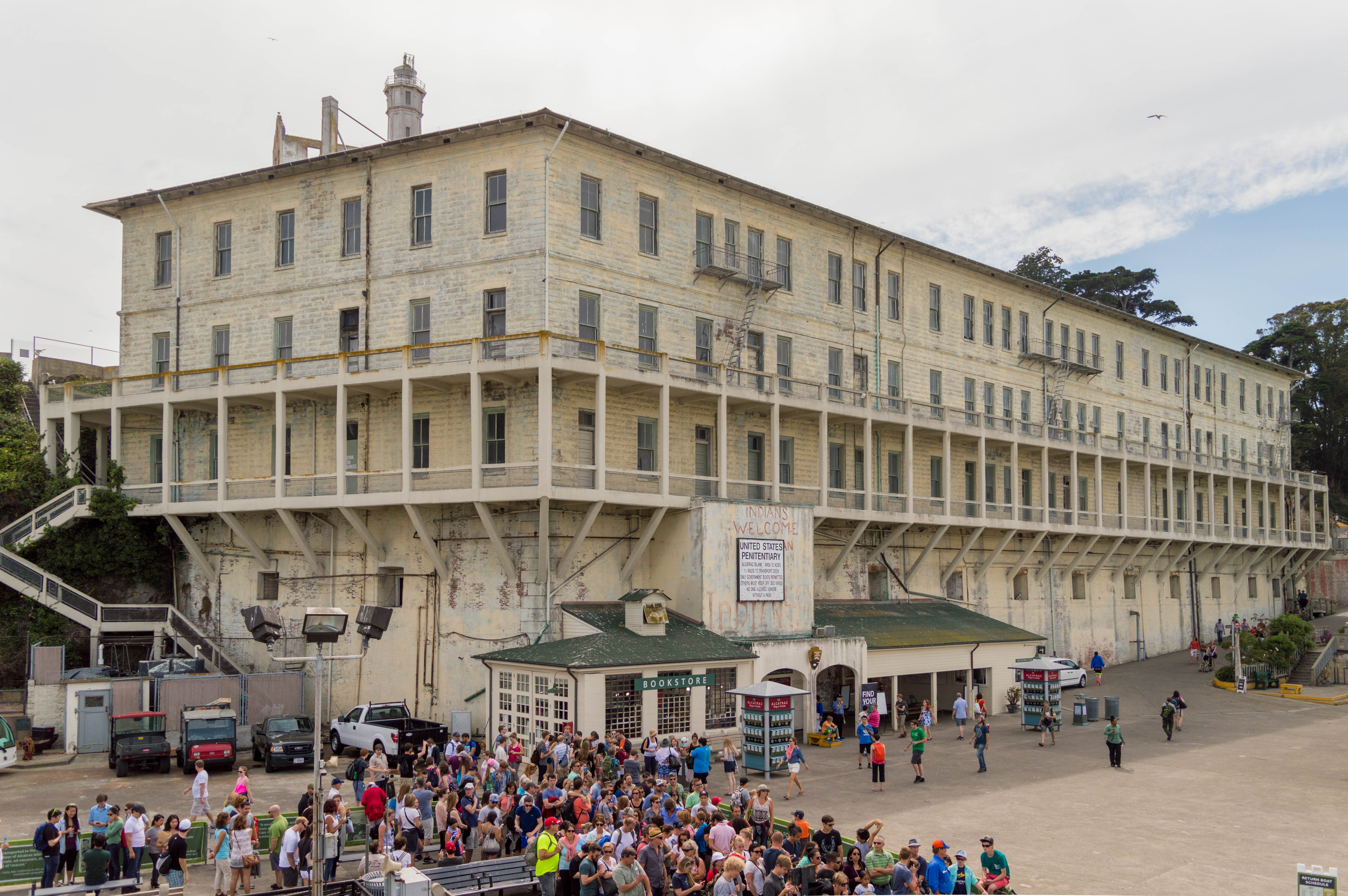
Building 64

Building 64, also known as the Building #64 or the Building 64 Residential Apartments, was the first building constructed on the island of Alcatraz off the coast of San Francisco, U.S., entirely for the purpose of accommodating the military officers and their families living on the island. Located next to the dock on the southeastern side of the island below the Warden's House, the three-story apartment block was built in 1905 on top of the U.S. Army barracks which had been there from the 1860s. It functioned as the Military Guard Barracks from 1906 until 1933. One of its largest apartments in the southwest corner was known as the "Cow Palace" and a nearby alleyway was known as "Chinatown".

During Federal prison times from 1934, the building gradually fell into a shabby state, and new quarters were built on the Parade Grounds, but most families arriving on the island stayed in Building 64 until a room in the newer quarters was available. Most of the other residential quarters have since been demolished, but Building 64 remains and has since been renovated. During the Occupation of Alcatraz, in 1970 the Native Americans drew graffiti in red around the "United States Penitentiary" sign saying "Indians welcome" and "Indian land". There is a book store on the ground floor on the left side of the building.

== Gallery ==
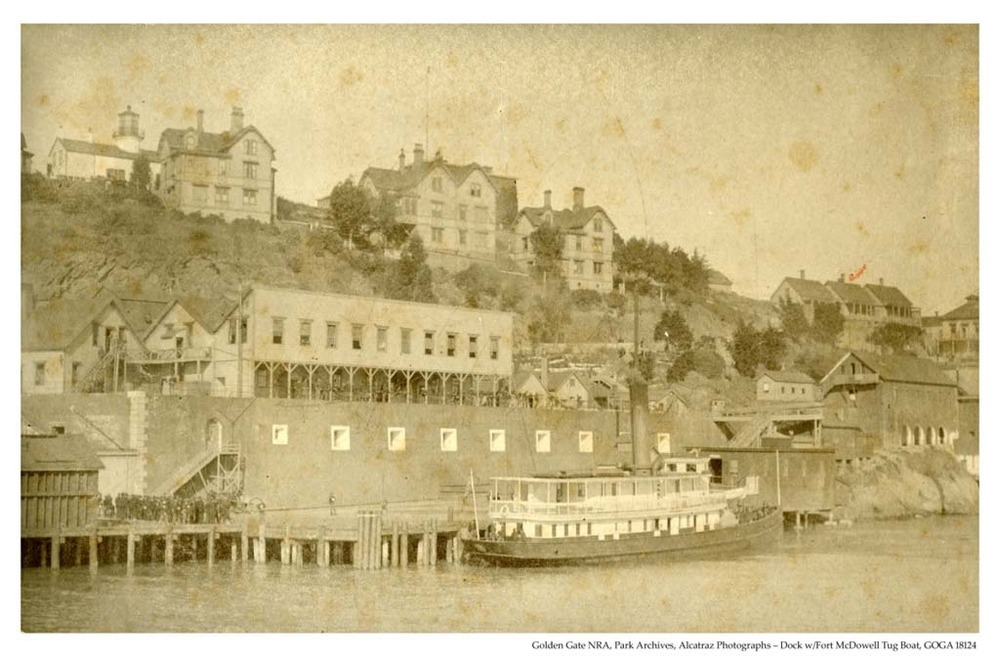
c.1900, The original Civil War-era structure before the top 3 floors were added.

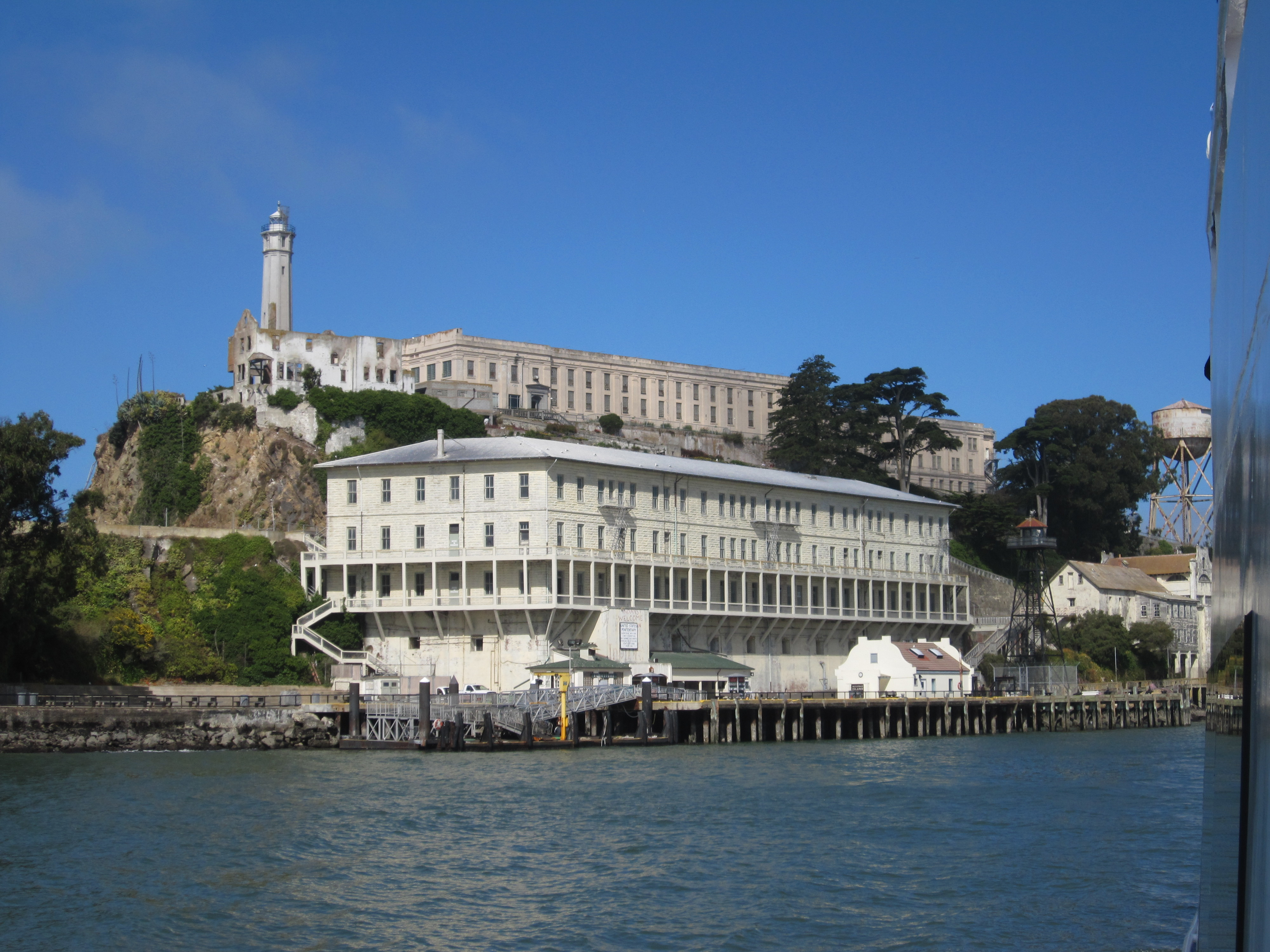
Alcatraz wharf and Building 64

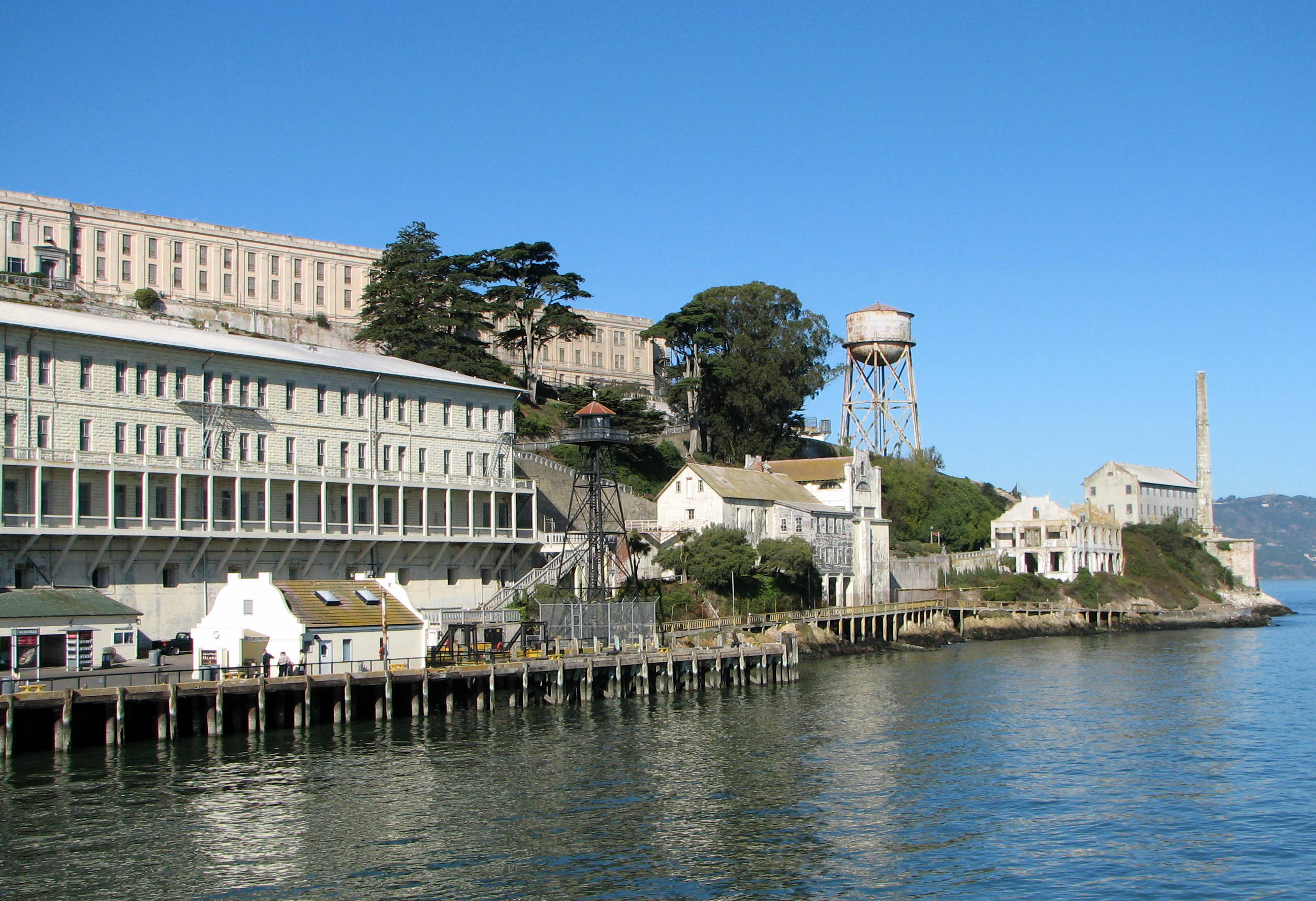
Building 64 is the large pillared building on the lower left.

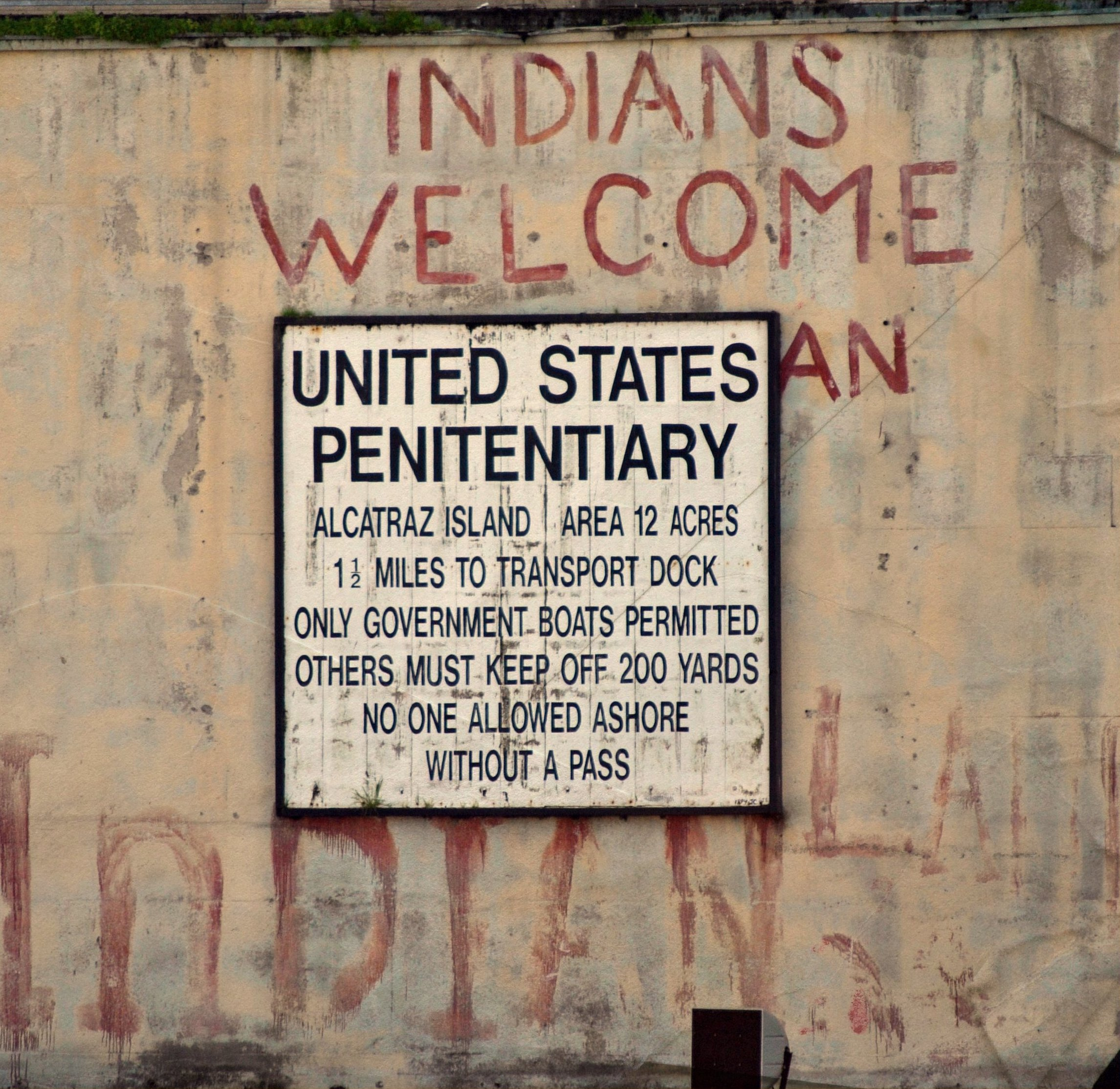
Prison sign on building and the Indian graffiti

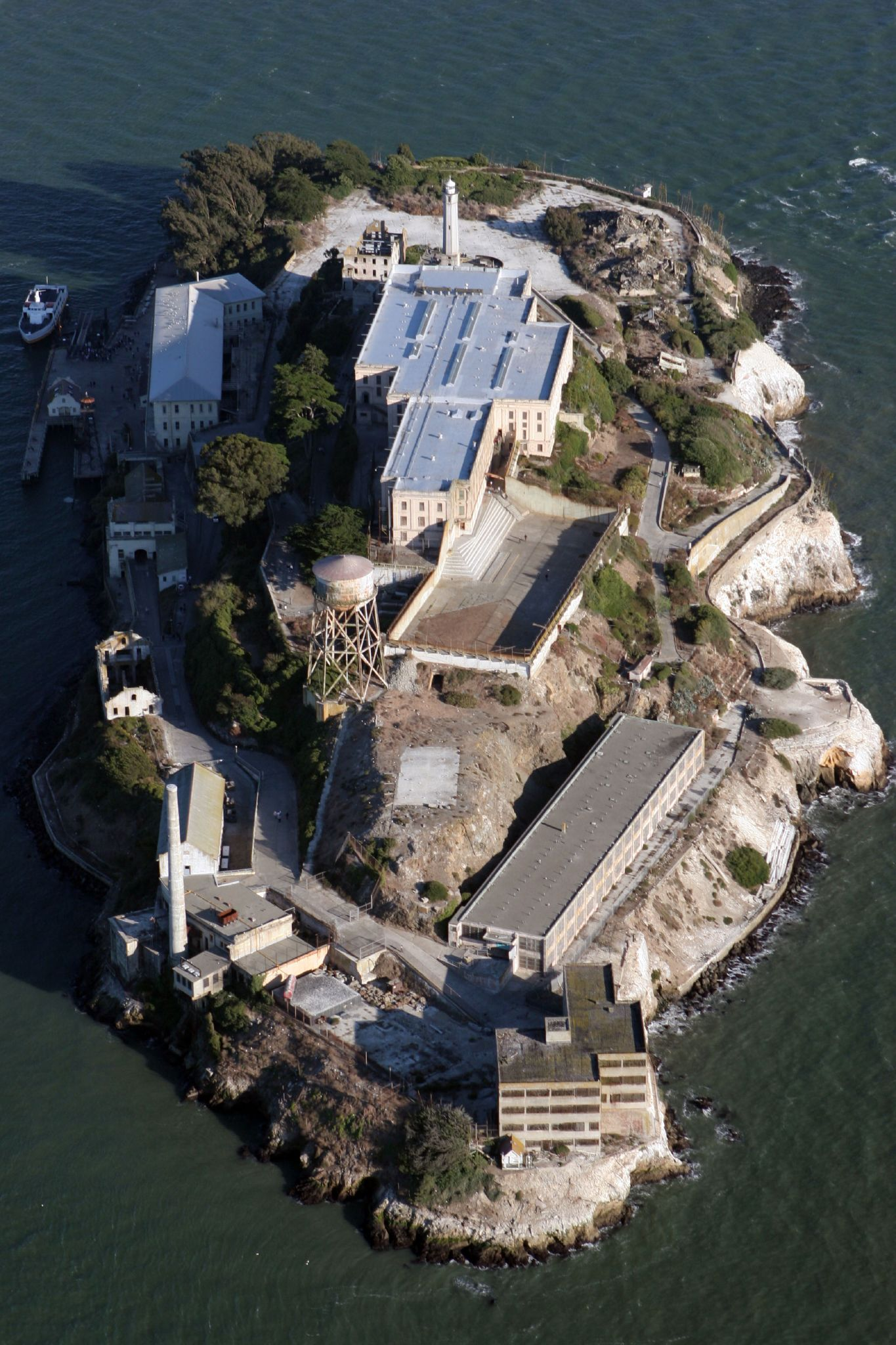
Building 64 can be seen furthest to the top left.
