= Delaware Township, Mercer County, Pennsylvania =

Township in Pennsylvania, US

Coordinates: 41°20′00″N 80°19′59″W

Delaware Township
- Township
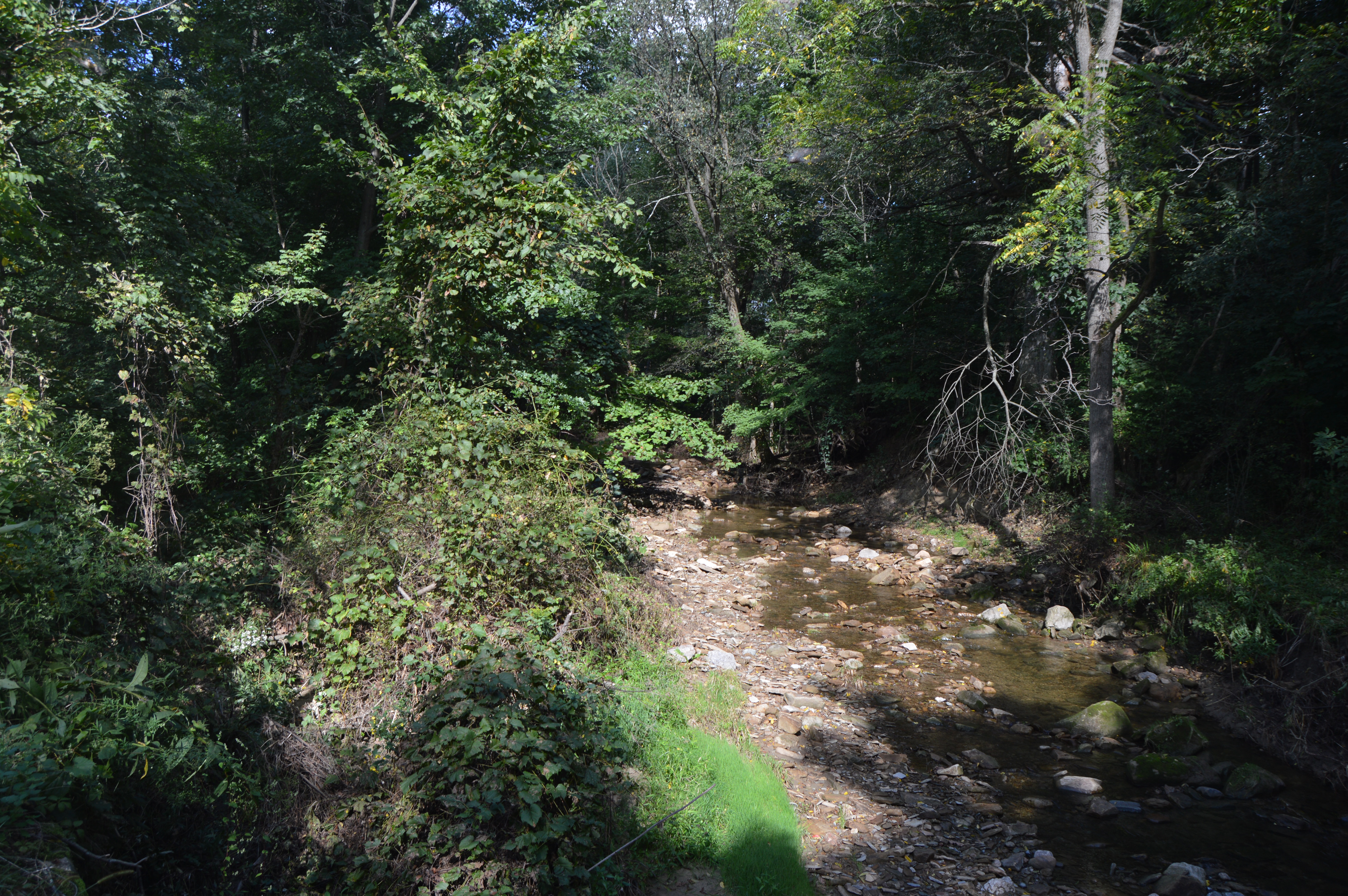
- Along a creek at New Hamburg

- Seal

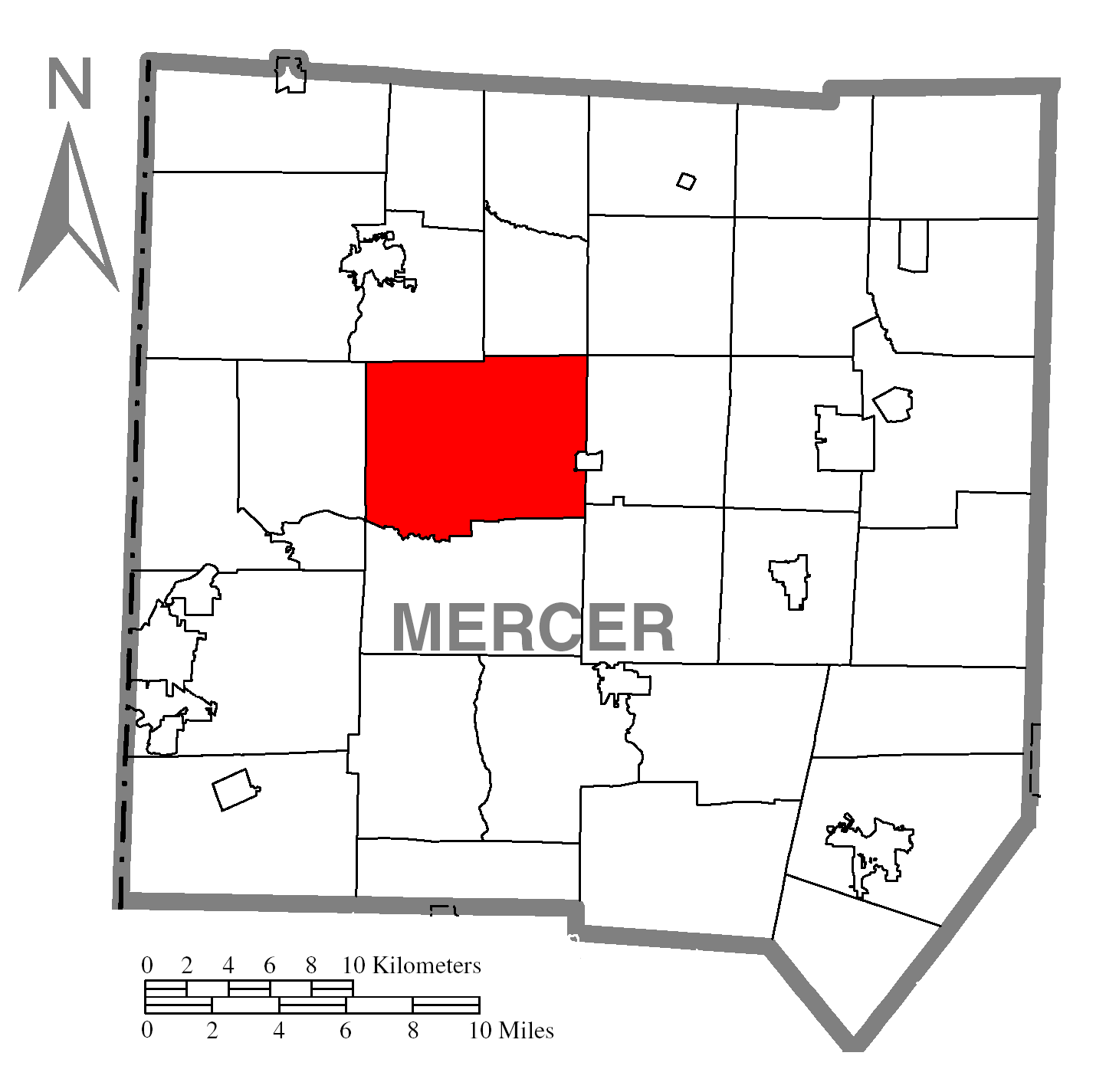
- Location of Delaware Township in Mercer County

- Location of Mercer County in Pennsylvania
- Country: United States
- State: Pennsylvania
- County: Mercer

Area
  - Total: 33.04 sq mi (85.57 km^{2})
  - Land: 32.68 sq mi (84.65 km^{2})
  - Water: 0.36 sq mi (0.93 km^{2})

Population (2020)
  - Total: 2,089
  - Estimate (2023): 2,062
  - Density: 68.0/sq mi (26.27/km^{2})
- Time zone: UTC-4 (EST)
  - Summer (DST): UTC-5 (EDT)
- Area code: 724
- FIPS code: 42-085-18688
- Website: delawaretownshipmc.com

Historical population
| Census | Pop. | Note | %± |
|---|---|---|---|
| 2000 | 2,159 | | — |
| 2010 | 2,291 | | 6.1% |
| 2020 | 2,088 | | −8.9% |
| 2023 (est.) | 2,062 | | −1.2% |
U.S. Decennial Census

Delaware Township is a township in Mercer County, Pennsylvania, United States. The population was 2,088 at the 2020 census, a decline from the figure of 2,291 in 2010.

== History ==
The New Hamburg Historical Area was added to the National Register of Historic Places in 1974.

== Geography ==
According to the United States Census Bureau, the township has a total area of 32.8 square miles (85 km^{2}), of which 32.5 square miles (84 km^{2}) is land and 0.3 square miles (0.78 km^{2}) (0.98%) is water.

== Demographics ==
As of the census of 2000, there were 2,159 people, 806 households, and 643 families residing in the township. The population density was 66.5 inhabitants per square mile (25.7/km^{2}). There were 842 housing units at an average density of 25.9 per square mile (10.0/km^{2}). The racial makeup of the township was 98.98% White, 0.09% African American, 0.14% Native American, 0.09% Asian, 0.19% from other races, and 0.51% from two or more races. Hispanic or Latino of any race were 0.28% of the population.

There were 806 households, out of which 32.4% had children under the age of 18 living with them, 69.9% were married couples living together, 6.2% had a female householder with no husband present, and 20.2% were non-families. 17.5% of all households were made up of individuals, and 7.4% had someone living alone who was 65 years of age or older. The average household size was 2.63 and the average family size was 2.97.

In the township the population was spread out, with 22.9% under the age of 18, 6.3% from 18 to 24, 27.9% from 25 to 44, 26.6% from 45 to 64, and 16.2% who were 65 years of age or older. The median age was 41 years. For every 100 females there were 109.4 males. For every 100 females age 18 and over, there were 102.2 males.

The median income for a household in the township was $42,240, and the median income for a family was $47,656. Males had a median income of $35,500 versus $24,917 for females. The per capita income for the township was $18,410. About 7.2% of families and 9.3% of the population were below the poverty line, including 14.6% of those under age 18 and 5.3% of those age 65 or over.
