= Pymatuning Township, Pennsylvania =

Township in Pennsylvania, US

Coordinates: 41°20′N 80°27′W

Pymatuning Township
- Township
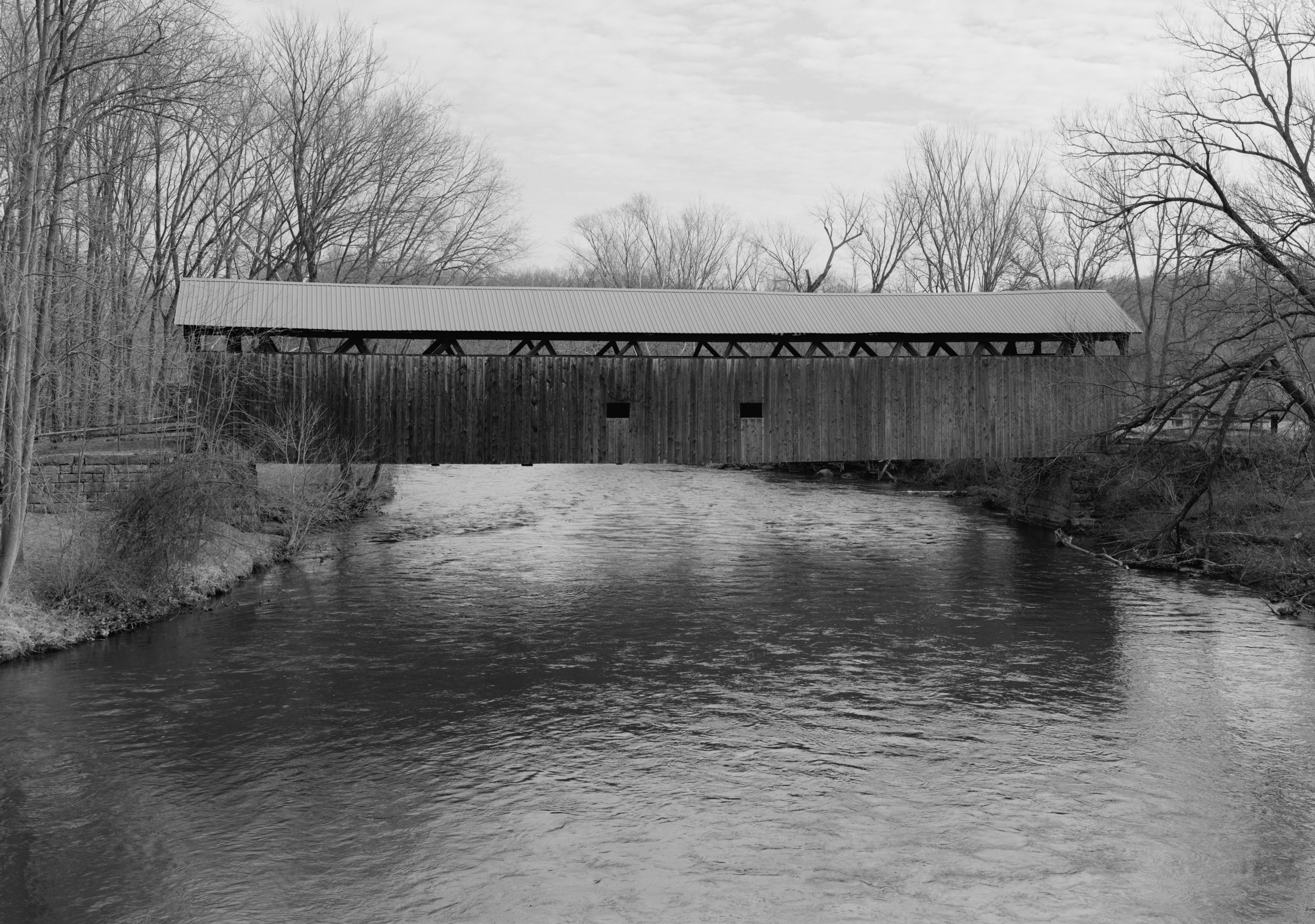
- Kidd's Mills Covered Bridge

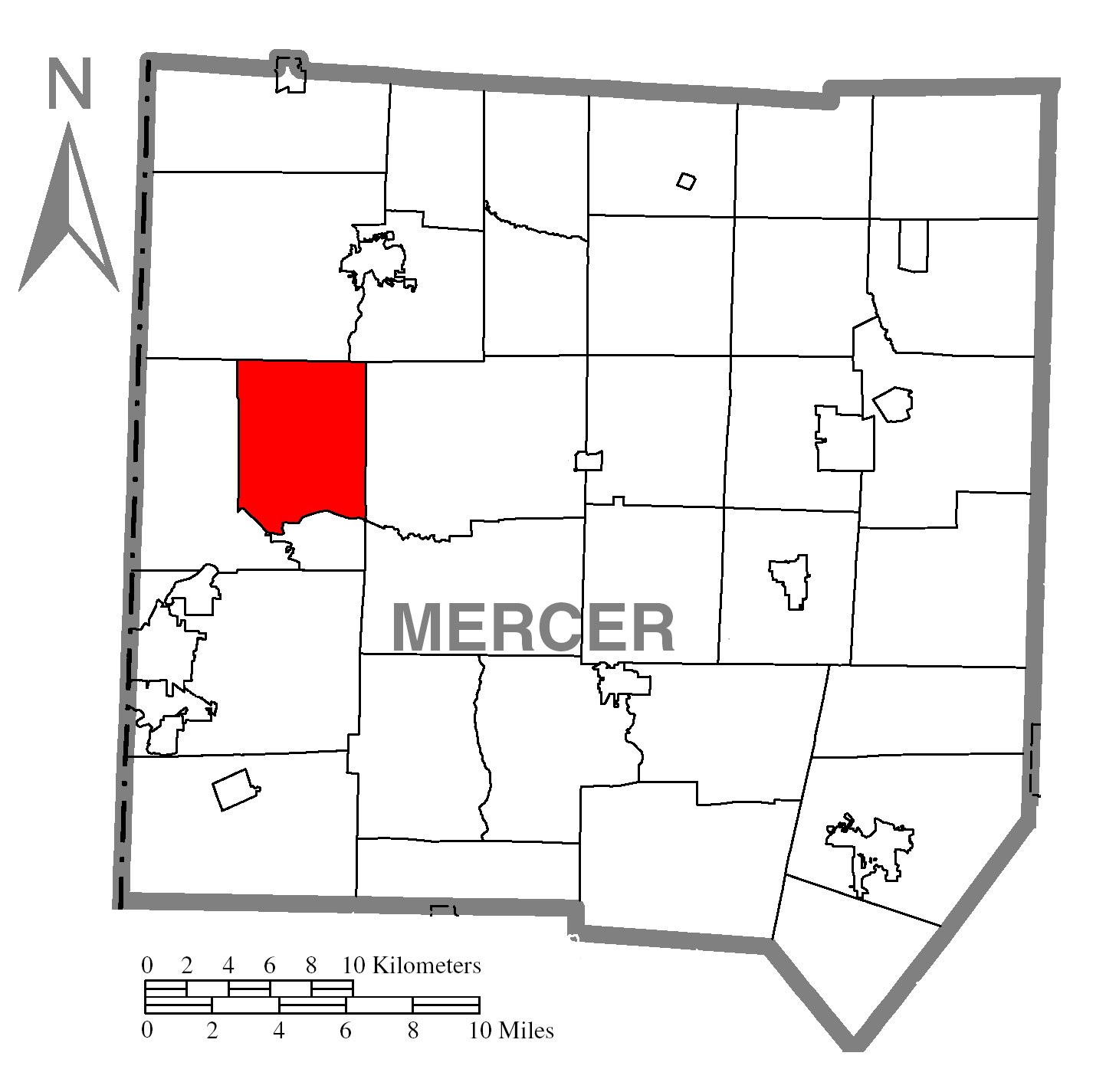
- Location of Pymatuning Township in Mercer County

- Location of Mercer County in Pennsylvania
- Country: United States
- State: Pennsylvania
- County: Mercer County

Area
  - Total: 17.72 sq mi (45.89 km^{2})
  - Land: 16.16 sq mi (41.85 km^{2})
  - Water: 1.56 sq mi (4.04 km^{2})

Population (2020)
  - Total: 3,117
  - Estimate (2022): 3,063
  - Density: 194.5/sq mi (75.09/km^{2})
- Time zone: UTC-4 (EST)
  - Summer (DST): UTC-5 (EDT)
- Area code: 724
- FIPS code: 42-085-63008
- Website: http://www.pymatuningtwp.com/

Historical population
Census	Pop.	Note	%±
2000	3,782		—
2010	3,281		−13.2%
2020	3,114		−5.1%
2022 (est.)	3,063		−1.6%
U.S. Decennial Census

Pymatuning Township is a township in Mercer County, Pennsylvania, United States. The population was 3,114 at the 2020 census, down from 3,281 in 2010.

== History ==
The Kidd's Mills Covered Bridge Historic District was added to the National Register of Historic Places in 1974.

== Geography ==
According to the United States Census Bureau, the township has a total area of 18.1 square miles (46.8 km^{2}), of which 16.5 square miles (42.7 km^{2}) is land and 1.6 square miles (4.1 km^{2}) (8.69%) is water. It contains part of the census-designated place of Reynolds Heights.

== Demographics ==
As of the census of 2000, there were 3,782 people, 1,519 households, and 1,093 families residing in the township. The population density was 229.3 inhabitants per square mile (88.5/km^{2}). There were 1,632 housing units at an average density of 98.9 per square mile (38.2/km^{2}). The racial makeup of the township was 98.31% White, 0.63% African American, 0.11% Native American, 0.16% Asian, 0.24% from other races, and 0.56% from two or more races. Hispanic or Latino of any race were 0.66% of the population.

There were 1,519 households, out of which 35.7% had children under the age of 18 living with them, 51.8% were married couples living together, 15.2% had a female householder with no husband present, and 28.0% were non-families. 23.6% of all households were made up of individuals, and 9.9% had someone living alone who was 65 years of age or older. The average household size was 2.49 and the average family size was 2.89.

In the township the population was spread out, with 27.6% under the age of 18, 7.2% from 18 to 24, 29.0% from 25 to 44, 22.4% from 45 to 64, and 13.7% who were 65 years of age or older. The median age was 37 years. For every 100 females there were 93.5 males. For every 100 females age 18 and over, there were 88.4 males.

The median income for a household in the township was $33,048, and the median income for a family was $37,500. Males had a median income of $32,055 versus $21,667 for females. The per capita income for the township was $15,164. About 16.1% of families and 16.2% of the population were below the poverty line, including 26.5% of those under age 18 and 3.1% of those age 65 or over.
