= Dillinger Gang =

American gang group of robbers

The Dillinger Gang
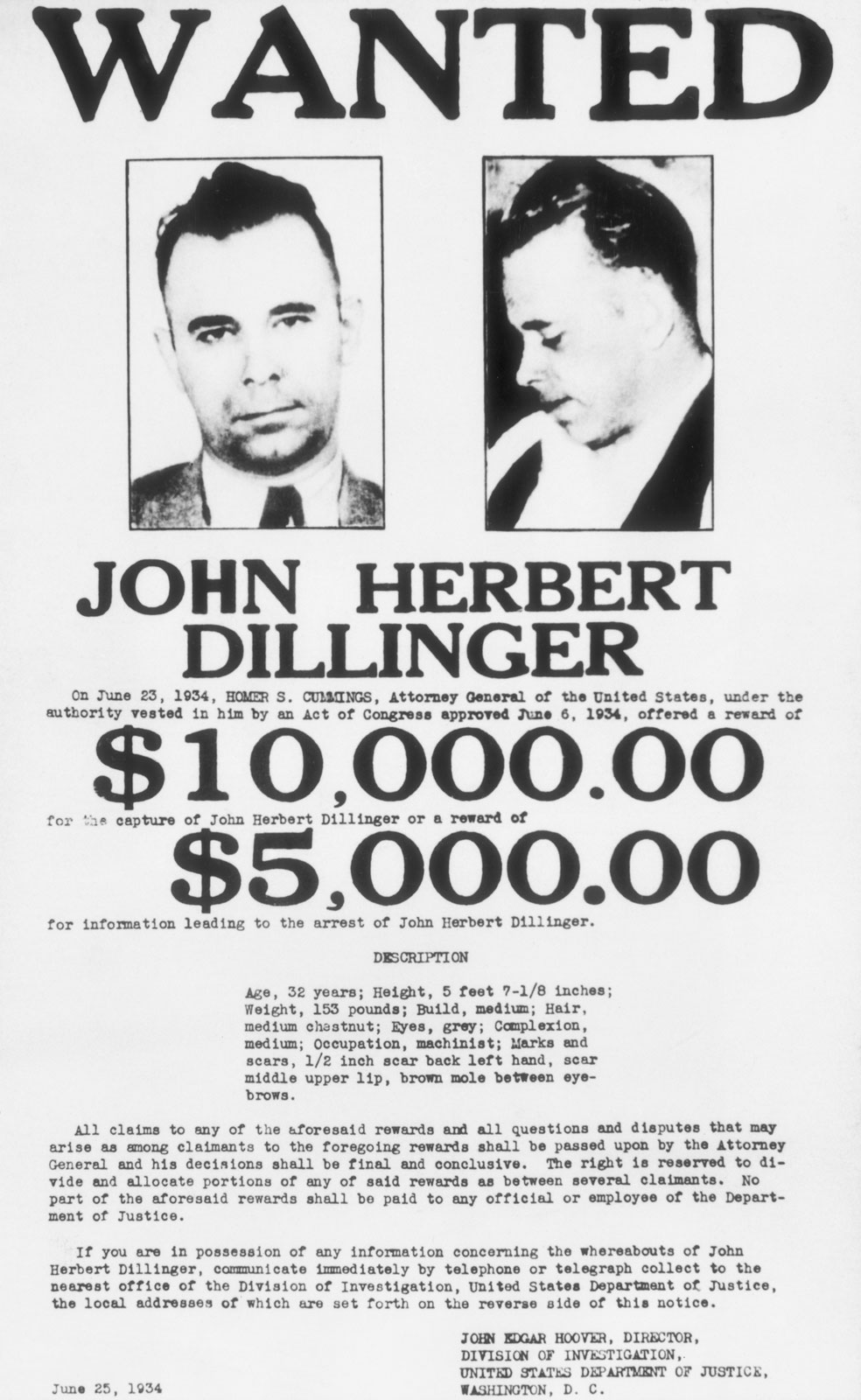
- Founded: 1933
- Founder: John Dillinger
- Founding location: Chicago, Illinois, United States
- Years active: 1933–1934
- Territory: Midwestern United States
- Ethnicity: Caucasian
- Membership: 14
- Leader: John Dillinger
- Activities: Bank robberies, money laundering, and murder
- Rivals: Federal Bureau of Investigation

The Dillinger Gang was a group of American Depression-era bank robbers led by John Dillinger. The gang gained notoriety for a successful string of bank robberies, using modern tools and tactics, in the Midwestern United States from September 1933 to July 1934. During this crime spree, the gang killed 10 and wounded 7. They managed to pull off three jail breaks which wounded two guards and killed a sheriff.

The increased use of new law enforcement techniques by the newly strengthened Bureau of Investigation (FBI predecessor) led to the dismantling of the gang. Many of its members were killed or imprisoned. Most notably, the BOI killed Dillinger in 1934 when he exited a movie theater.

== Known members ==
1. John Dillinger
2. Baby Face Nelson
3. John "Red" Hamilton
4. Homer Van Meter
5. Harry "Pete" Pierpont
6. Charles Makley
7. Russell Clark
8. Ed Shouse
9. Harry Copeland
10. Tommy Carroll
11. Eddie Green

== Tactics ==
The gang employed military-inspired tactics taught to them in prison by men such as Herman Lamm. Tactics included the use of roles during the robbery: Lookout, getaway driver, lobby man, and vault man. Gang members had modern weapons like the Thompson submachine gun and also had bulletproof vests.

Lamm is credited with creating the first detailed getaway maps, known as "gits", to improve the chances for escape after the robbery. Powerful vehicles, like Ford coupes with a V8 engine, at the scene of the crime were known as "work cars" but were discarded after the crime to foil eye-witness reports given to police. Gangsters made use of caches of gasoline for their getaway cars as well as medical kits to treat injuries.

== Activities ==
- Before Lima:
  - New Carlisle National Bank, New Carlisle, Ohio, of $10,000 on June 21, 1933;
  - The Commercial Bank, Daleville, Indiana, of $3,500 on July 17, 1933;
  - Montpelier National Bank, Montpelier, Indiana, of $6,700 on August 4, 1933;
  - Bluffton Bank, Bluffton, Ohio, of $6,000 on August 14, 1933;
  - Massachusetts Avenue State Bank, Indianapolis, Indiana, of $21,000 on September 6, 1933;
- After Dillinger was broken out of Lima:
  - Home Banking Company, Saint Marys, Ohio of $12,000;
  - Central National Bank and Trust Co., Greencastle, Indiana, of $74,802 on October 23, 1933;
  - American Bank and Trust Co., Racine, Wisconsin, of $28,000 on November 20, 1933;
  - First National Bank, East Chicago, Indiana, of $20,000 on January 15, 1934;
- After Dillinger's escape from Crown Point:
  - Securities National Bank and Trust Co., Sioux Falls, South Dakota, of $49,500 on March 6, 1934;
  - First National Bank, Mason City, Iowa, of $52,000 on March 13, 1934;
  - First National Bank, Fostoria, Ohio, of $17,000 on May 3, 1934;
  - Merchants National Bank, South Bend, Indiana, of $29,890 on June 30, 1934.

To obtain more supplies, the gang attacked the state police arsenals in Auburn, Indiana and Peru, Indiana, stealing machine guns, rifles, revolvers, ammunition, and bulletproof vests. On October 23, 1933, the gang robbed the Central National Bank & Trust Company in Greencastle, Indiana, making off with $74,802. They then headed to Chicago to hide out.

The gang traveled to Racine, Wisconsin and robbed the American Bank and Trust Company, making off with $28,000. On December 14, 1933, CPD Detective William Shanley was killed. The police had been put on high alert and suspected the Dillinger gang of involvement in the robbery of the Unity Trust And Savings Bank of $8,700 the day before. The robbery was eventually determined to have been the work of another outfit. Shanley was following up on a tip that one of the gang's cars was being serviced at a local garage. John "Red" Hamilton showed up at the garage that afternoon. When Shanley approached him, Hamilton pulled a pistol and shot him twice, killing Shanley, then escaped. Shanley's murder led to the Chicago Police Department's establishment of a forty-man "Dillinger Squad".

=== Daytona Beach, Florida ===
Dillinger and Evelyn Frechette were at a house on Daytona Beach, Florida on December 19. A day or two later they were joined by members of his gang; these were Pierpont, Makley, Russell Clark and Opal Long. Edwin Utter was the caretaker who occupied the garage apartment at the same address, and he told how the couples did not bother anyone (they "kept to themselves") and had no outside contacts, as far as he knew, and he did not see anyone visit them. To Utter the group had the appearance of gangsters. Someone in the group at some time mentioned to him they were coming from Chicago. Utter said the group received a considerable amount of mail. After the gang had gone, several letters came addressed to Frank Kirtley (an alias of Dillinger), J. C. Davies (alias of Makley), and J. C. Evans (an alias of Pierpont), but as the gang had not left a forwarding addresses, they were returned to the postman.

Utter stated there was considerable drinking going on, especially at night. He said the gang stayed at the cottage until about January 12, leaving at night. This January date would have posed yet another problem for Dillinger's defense team had he gone to trial for Officer O'Malley's killing.

=== East Chicago robbery ===
While Makley, Clark, and Pierpont extended their vacation by driving west to Tucson, Arizona, Dillinger left Florida on January 12 and met up with Hamilton in Chicago at noon on January 15, a meeting that had been arranged between the two men while Dillinger was in Daytona Beach. Later that afternoon they robbed the First National Bank in East Chicago. East Chicago marked the first time serious violence occurred at a Dillinger robbery, a trend that would continue through South Bend, the last job. Killed by Dillinger was East Chicago patrolman William Patrick O'Malley, the outlaw's first and only murder victim. At approximately 2:50 p.m., 10 minutes before closing time, Dillinger, Hamilton, and an unidentified driver pulled up in front of the bank on Chicago Avenue on the wrong side of the street, facing east in the westbound lane, double parked, and exited the vehicle, leaving the driver to wait in the idling car.

Hamilton waited in the bank's vestibule while Dillinger entered the main room of the bank. Once inside, Dillinger leisurely opened up a leather case containing a Thompson, pulled it out, and yelled to the 20 to 30 people in the bank, "This is a stickup. Put up your hands and get back against the wall." The bank's vice president, Walter Spencer, while hiding, kicked a button which touched off the burglar alarm. Dillinger then went to the door of the vestibule and told Hamilton to come in. Hamilton produced a small leather bag and began scooping up the cash cage by cage. Dillinger told him, "Take your time. We're in no hurry."

Meanwhile, the first police contingent arrived on the scene after receiving the alarm at police headquarters. Four officers arrived: Patrick O'Malley, Hobart Wilgus, Pete Whalen, and Julius Schrenko. After a quick look through the windows of the bank, the officers could see a holdup was in progress and that one of the men was carrying a submachine gun. Shrenko ran to a nearby drugstore and called for more backup. While Schrenko was calling headquarters, Wilgus entered the bank by himself, but was soon covered by Dillinger. The outlaw "relieved" him of his pistol, emptied the cartridges, then tossed it back to the officer. Referring to his Thompson, Dillinger told Wilgus, "You oughtn't be afraid of this thing. I ain't even sure it'll shoot."

Turning his attention to Hamilton, Dillinger said, "Don't let those coppers outside worry you. Take your time and be sure to get all the dough. We'll take care of them birds on the outside when we get there." Dillinger then discovered the hiding VP, Spencer, and ordered him up against the wall with everyone else.

Schrenko's call for backup emptied the station of all but its phone operator. Four more officers arrived: Captains Tim O'Neil and Ed Knight, and Officers Nick Ranich and Lloyd Mulvihill (Mulvihill would be murdered by Van Meter on May 24). These four officers joined the other three in positions on either side of the Chicago Avenue entrance to the bank. Apparently, not one of them noticed the getaway car double parked on the wrong side of the street right outside the bank door, with its driver sitting unconcerned in the seat with the motor running.

Dillinger then ordered Spencer and Wilgus to lead the way out of the bank, acting as shields. The four walked down the sidewalk toward the car. O'Malley, standing about 20 feet from the front door, saw an opening and fired four times at Dillinger, the bullets bouncing off the outlaw's bullet-proof vest. Dillinger pushed Spencer away with the barrel of his Thompson and yelled, "Get over. I'll get that son of a bitch." O'Malley fell dead, with eight holes in a line across his chest. As Hamilton made his way into the street, he took a bullet to the right hand, causing him to drop an emptied pistol. Dillinger kept firing until he climbed into the rear seat of the car. Two game wardens who had driven up to the scene emptied their guns into the car as it started to pull away. The car actually started to pull away before Hamilton had closed the left rear door, and the door was partly torn off as it caught on the rear of another vehicle. The Ohio plates used at the gang's earlier robbery of a Greencastle bank in October were used on the East Chicago getaway car. Police believed the car "may have been a Plymouth", but was actually a 1934 Ford two-door sedan. The abandoned car was found the following day at Byron Street and California Avenue, Chicago.

Every officer, as well as numerous witnesses inside the bank, identified Dillinger as being one of the robbers – and the gang member who shot Officer O'Malley. Prints were taken of the piece Hamilton left behind, which identified him. Dillinger was officially charged with Officer O'Malley's murder, although the identity of the actual killer is debatable, and it is still questioned by some whether Dillinger participated in the robbery at all.

As police began closing in again, the men left Chicago to hide out first in Florida; later at the Gardner Hotel in El Paso, Texas, where a highly visible police presence dissuaded Dillinger from trying to cross the border at the Santa Fe Bridge in downtown El Paso to Ciudad Juárez, Mexico. They instead crossed the border further South in Texas, eventually making their way to Tucson, Arizona.

=== Hiding out in Tucson ===
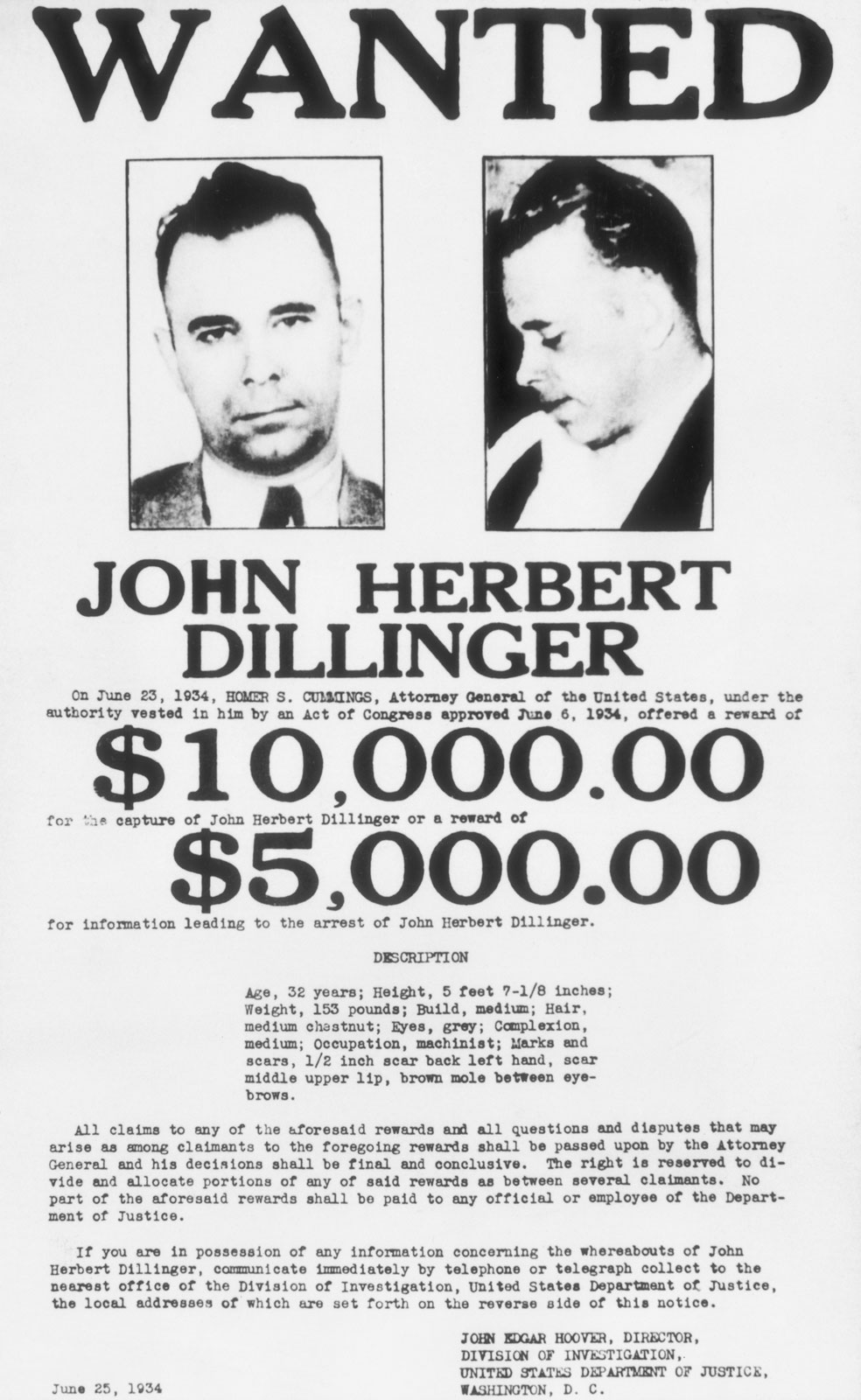
Issued on June 23, 1934; authorized by Homer S. Cummings, U.S. Attorney General.

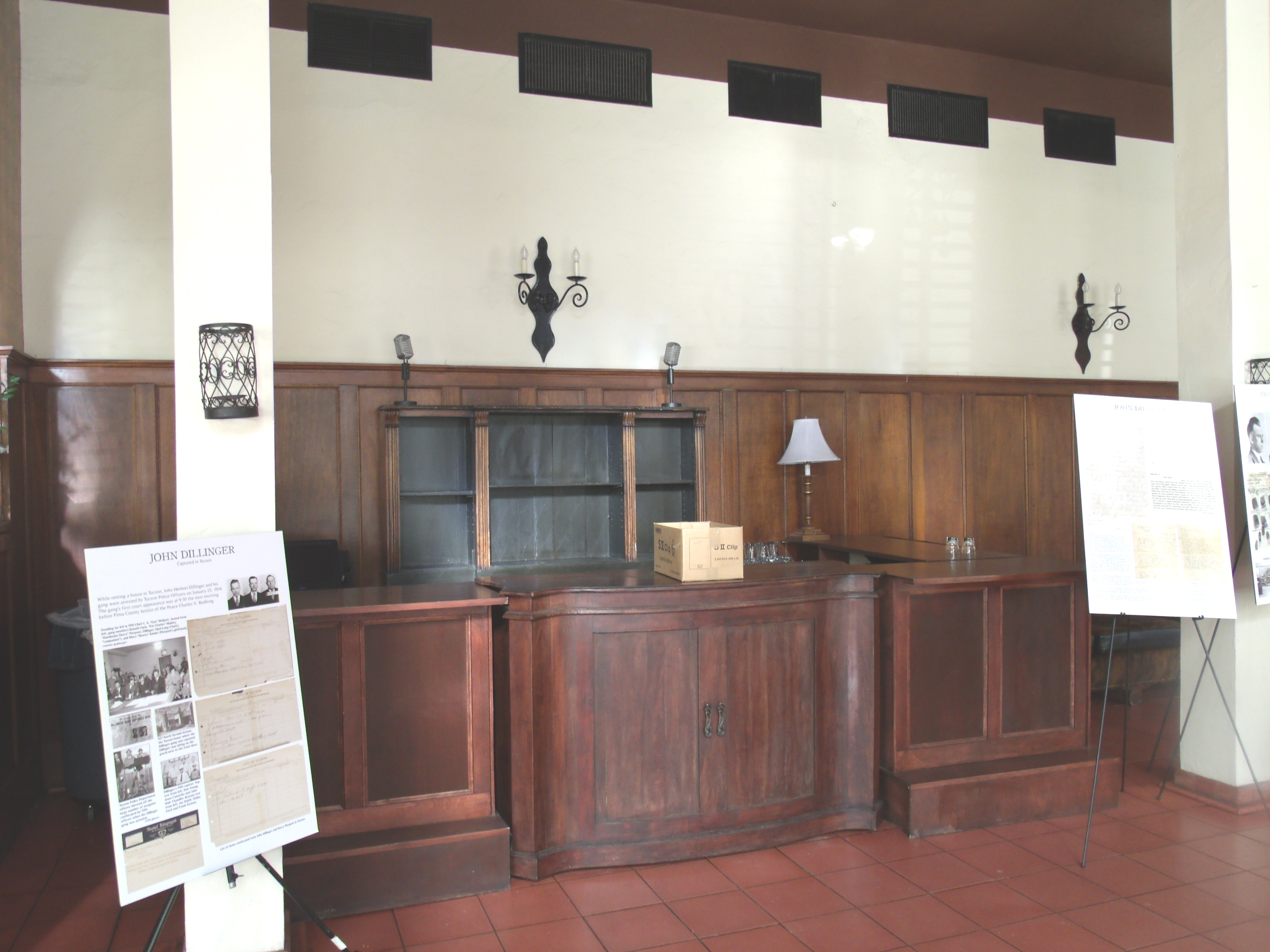
The old lobby of the Hotel Congress which was built in 1919 and associated with John Dillinger. The hotel is located at 303-311 E. Congress St. in Tucson, Arizona.

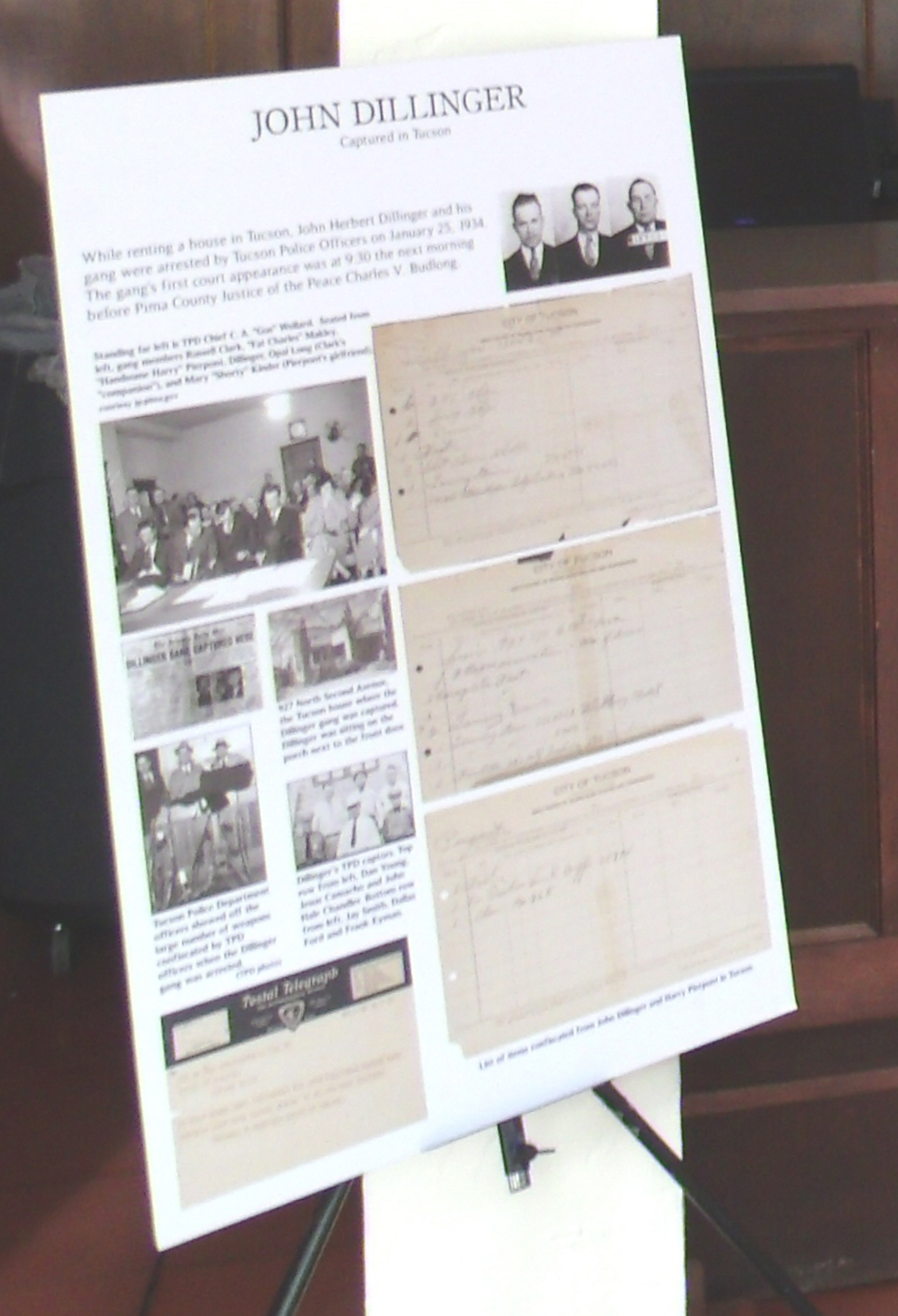
Display of newspaper clippings of the capture of John Dillinger and his gang in the old lobby of the Congress Hotel

On January 21, 1934, a fire broke out at the Hotel Congress in Tucson where members of the Dillinger gang were staying. Forced to leave their luggage behind, they were rescued through a window and down a fire truck ladder. Makley and Clark tipped several firemen $12 (each, according to a bureau report) to climb back up and retrieve the luggage, affording the firefighters a good look at several members of Dillinger's gang. One of them, William Benedict, later recognized Makley, Pierpont, and Ed Shouse while thumbing through a copy of True Detective and informed the police, who traced Makley's luggage to 927 North Second Avenue. Officers from the Tucson Police Department went to the address on the afternoon of January 25, and there arrested Clark after a struggle. They found him in possession of $1,264.70 in cash.

Makley was then followed to the Grabbe Electric & Radio Store on Congress Street, where he was looking at a radio capable of picking up police calls, and was apprehended there. He had $794.09 of cash in his possession.

To capture Pierpont, the police staged a routine traffic stop and lured him to the police station, where they took him by surprise and arrested him. There was $99.81 recovered in Pierpont's personal effects and $3,116.20 on Mary Kinder.

Dillinger was the last one taken, caught when he returned to the bungalow where Clark was captured. He had $7,175.44 in his possession, including notes from his robbery of the First National Bank in East Chicago, A000919 through A001107. These amounts, along with a leather money bag found, totaled over $25,000 in cash, as well as a cache of machine guns and several automatic weapons. The men were extradited to the Midwest after a debate between prosecutors as to where the gang would be prosecuted first. The governor compromised, and ordered that Dillinger would be extradited to the Lake County Jail in Crown Point for Officer O'Malley's murder in the East Chicago bank robbery, while Pierpont, Makley and Clark were sent to Ohio to stand trial for Sheriff Sarber's murder. Shouse's testimony at the March 1934 trials of Pierpont, Makley and Clark led to all three men being convicted. Pierpont and Makley received the death penalty, while Clark received a life sentence. On September 22, Makley would be shot dead by guards when he and Pierpont attempted to escape with fake pistols that were carved from bars of soap and painted black with shoe polish. Pierpont was wounded, and executed on October 17. Clark would ultimately be released in 1968, dying of cancer a few months later.

Dillinger was flown back from Douglas Airport, Tucson, to Midway Airport, Chicago over the course of two days. With Lake County Chief Deputy Carroll Holley (Sheriff Lillian Holley's nephew), and East Chicago Chief of Police Nick Makar escorting the outlaw, the plane departed Tucson at 11:14 p.m. on Monday, January 29. After stops in Douglas, Arizona (plane change), El Paso, Abilene, Dallas (another plane change), Fort Worth, Little Rock and Memphis (another plane change, a Ford Tri-Motor), there was yet another stop in St. Louis, where Chicago Times reporter/photographer Sol Davis boarded the aircraft and was obliged by Dillinger to take a few photos and ask some questions. After a while, growing weary of the questions and being photographed, the outlaw told Davis, "Go away and let me sleep." Dillinger's brutal flight schedule ended at about 6 p.m. on January 30 when the plane finally touched down at Midway. Waiting for him on the ground were 32 heavily armed Chicago policemen. A 13-car caravan consisting of 29 troopers from Indiana was ready to escort Dillinger to Crown Point, 30 miles away, to be tried for the O'Malley killing.

=== Sioux Falls, South Dakota, robbery ===
Dillinger was for a time imprisoned at Crown Point jail, although he later escaped. Three days after Dillinger's escape, at about 9:45 a.m. on March 6, a vehicle (green 1934 Packard Super 8, 1934 Kansas license 13-786) filled with six members of the gang parked near the curb at the Security National Bank and Trust Company in Sioux Falls. One of the bank's bookkeepers, Mary Lucas, looked out the window and saw the Packard roll up the street. "If I ever saw a holdup car, that's one", she said to a bank stenographer next to her. The stenographer laughed, saying that she'd been hearing too much lately about bank robberies. Before they could return to their desks, Dillinger, Nelson, Green, and Van Meter had entered the bank and subdued both tellers and customers. Hamilton, the driver, stayed with the car, while Tommy Carroll patrolled outside the bank with a Thompson. Inside, Nelson spotted motorcycle patrolman Hale Keith who was approaching the bank on foot. He fired his Thompson at Keith through a plate glass window while standing on an assistant cashier's counter. Multiple bullets hit Keith in the abdomen, in the right leg, about six inches below the hip, the right wrist, and the right arm, just below the elbow, but he would survive. Nelson was reported to have laughed when Keith fell, then saying, "I got one! I got one!"

H. M. Shoebotham, a reporter for the Daily Argus-Leader, was in the office of Sheriff Mel Sells at the time of the Sheriff receiving a call informing him of the robbery. Mel grabbed a machine gun and a riot gun, and gave the riot gun to Shoebotham. They both got into a car and drove to the robbery scene, three blocks away.

On the way to the bank, Sells figured his strategy. Across from the bank stood the Lincoln Hotel. He planned to reach a second floor window and fire at the robbers. When he reached the bank, scores of spectators were watching the activities. In the center of the street in front of the bank Carroll was standing with a machine gun. Occasionally, he would fire a few volleys, supposedly to keep the assembled people impressed. There exists a photograph taken of Tommy Carroll from across the street during the robbery, an "action" photo that is most likely unique to prewar bank robberies. Sheriff Sells backed his coupe into the alley behind the Lincoln Hotel and took his weapon to the second floor, leaving the Thompson with Shoebotham.

Surrounding themselves with bystanders, the gang backed out of the bank to the Packard. No officers dared to shoot. The outlaws picked out five people to go with as hostages and commanded them to stand on the running boards. The hostages were Leo Olson, a bank teller; Mildred Bostwick, Alice Biegen, and Emma Knabach, stenographers; and Mary Lucas.

As the Packard sped away from the bank, Patrolman Harley Chrisman managed to shoot out the radiator. Shortly after they left town, they swerved to avoid collisions with two horse-drawn milk wagons. Moments later, Dillinger released Olson, then made the women get into the car, which was already packed with the rest of the gang, their guns, extra gasoline cans, and the robbery loot.

Bill Conklin of the Wilson service station on South Minnesota Avenue saw the Packard coming down the street with smoke pouring from the hood and assumed the car was on fire. He ran into the station, grabbed a fire extinguisher and ran back out. One of the robbers said, "Get back in there" as they had slowed up for him.

The car eventually began to slow down right outside of town, giving three pursuing police cars time to catch up. Two miles outside of the Lakeland farm, the gang got out of the Packard and made the hostages stand around them, then opened fire on their pursuers. The three squad cars retreated. The gang then hijacked a car owned by local farmer Alfred Musch, and transferred the gas cans and money into it.

About 10 miles outside of Sioux Falls, the gang released the hostages and drove off. The hostages were eventually picked up by a passing motorist who drove them back to the bank.

The police scoured the highways by ground and by air over a 50-mile segment of territory south and east of Sioux Falls. The men they were looking for were believed to have ditched Musch's Dodge for "a big Lincoln" about two or three miles northwest of Shindler. From St. Paul came the assurance that 20 police cars were patrolling all roads heading into St. Paul and Minneapolis, but the gang made it safely back to the Twin Cities and began preparing for the Mason City heist.

=== Mason City, Iowa, robbery ===
Seven days later, on the afternoon of March 13, at 2:40 p.m., the same six (Dillinger, Nelson, Hamilton, Green, Van Meter, and Carroll), plus an added seventh man as the probable driver, either Joseph Burns or Red Forsythe, drove down State Street in a 1933 blue Buick 90 series sedan (with the rear window removed) and parked in front of Mulcahy's prescription shop. All sources tell a different story as to who went in the bank and who patrolled outside, but it was believed certain that Dillinger took a position outside the front entrance, with Nelson on the north side of the street near the alley behind the bank, and at least Hamilton and Green entered the bank, with probably Van Meter. From descriptions by witnesses later, Tommy Carroll was also positioned outside. Carroll stood in the doorway of the prescription shop on State.

Freelance photographer H. C. Kunkleman happened to be filming the bank when the robbery began. Kunkleman was told by one of the bandits to turn the camera off, that they would be the ones doing all the shooting. He began filming again once the gang made their getaway (the five-minute film still exists). Green and Hamilton (and probably Van Meter) entered the bank and fired volleys into the walls and ceiling. Thirty-one employees and approximately 25 customers were ordered to put their hands up. Tom Walters, a bank guard positioned in an elevated bulletproof observation booth near the front entrance, fired a tear gas cartridge, according to procedure, which hit Green in the back. Walters' tear gas gun then jammed. One of the robbers, either Van Meter or Green, sprayed the booth with machine-gun fire, which shattered the glass, but left Walters unharmed. Tom Barclay, a clerk, threw a tear gas grenade over the balcony of the lobby. While the tellers' cash drawers were being emptied (drawers 1, 2, 3, 4, 6 and 7, missing 5, about $5,000), Hamilton grabbed assistant cashier Harry Fisher and brought him back to open the vault. About a week earlier, Eddie Green (most likely) had appeared at Fisher's door asking for directions, then peered attentively at Fisher's face, something Fisher would later remember. Directions for alternate routes for the getaway were also mapped out at this time.

Once they got to the vault, Hamilton erred by allowing a steel gate to close and lock between him and Fisher. Fisher now could only hand stacks of $5 bills to Hamilton through the bars, greatly reducing the gang's take from $250,000 to $52,000. During the robbery, Green would periodically yell out the time to the others.

Meanwhile, crowds began to form outside after word had spread that a robbery was in progress at the bank. James Buchanan, an off-duty officer, who had grabbed a sawed-off shotgun when he heard about the robbery, hid behind the Grand Army of the Republic monument. Unable to fire because of the crowd of people, he instead exchanged barbs with Dillinger. Of the robbers, Dillinger was the only one for whom a clothing description could be provided: light gray suit, dark overcoat and dark hat. Buchanan called back for him to get away from the crowd and he would fight it out with him. Buchanan said that Dillinger's upper lip turned into a snarl as he talked. Dillinger, armed with a Thompson, drew a .38 from an inside pocket and fired at Buchanan, but missed.

Outside the bank, Nelson was acting somewhat crazily, firing randomly in different directions. One man, R. L. James, was hit in the leg by one of Nelson's bursts. Tommy Carroll came over to check on James' condition. An oncoming car came and Carroll blasted it with his machine gun. "The radiator of the car was filled with lead and the frantic driver backed out at the rate of 25 mph [40 km/h]." From his third-floor office above the bank, police judge John C. Shipley heard the gunfire and went to the window. Dillinger sent a volley of shots in Shipley's direction, warning him to stay back. The judge retreated, but went to his desk and grabbed a pistol, then returned to the window and fired, hitting Dillinger in the left shoulder.

Hamilton, Green and Van Meter, with a large canvas bag of cash, left through the front door of the bank, surrounding themselves with hostages that Dillinger had collected. The entire gang moved as one around the corner onto State Street, with Dillinger in the center of the group. Judge Shipley, again, was at a window from above the bank and risked firing into the group, this time striking Hamilton in the shoulder. When Hamilton saw R. L. James lying on the street wounded, he said, "I thought there wasn't going to be any more of this?" Nelson, who had now joined them, said, "I thought he was a copper."

Nelson then stopped two women who had just come out of a nearby butcher shop and were at the intersection of State Street and the alley directly east of the bank, and marshalled them to the car and commanded them to stand outside of it. Before they reached the car, Nelson snatched the package of meat from Mrs. Clark's hands, threw it to the ground and stomped on it, silencing her protests with, "You'll get paid plenty for it."

The number of hostages varies wildly in Dillinger books, but the Mason City Globe-Gazette from that day names 11 people. A couple of women sat inside the car on the robbers' laps. Bill Schmidt, an employee of Killmer Drug, was delivering a bag of sandwiches to the bank and was stopped by Dillinger and also shoved into the Buick. While riding through town, the bag of sandwiches was discovered and they were quickly eaten by the gang.

The Buick slowly moved north on Federal Avenue to 2nd Street, taking a left, headed west to Adams, taking another left. The car stayed at about 25 mph (40 km/h) within the downtown area. Near 4th Street, Clarence McGowan, along with his wife and five-year-old daughter, spotted the car. McGowan began to pursue the bandit car after mistakenly believing the vehicle, loaded with people on the outside of the car, to be part of a wedding or "some kind of wild demonstration". He was shot in the abdomen after pulling up too close to the Buick. McGowan went home and bathed before going to the hospital. Both McGowan and R. L. James, Nelson's casualty, recovered.

The Buick stopped from time to time so that roofing nails could be spread across the highway, "sacks full of them". Oncoming cars were stopped by the gang and were ordered to stay where they were for five minutes before moving on. Bill Schmidt said that "The bandits would drive fairly fast on the straight away, but slowed down for the bumps." The hostages were let off a few at a time and individually. Mrs. Clark (carrying the meat earlier) and Mrs. Graham were the last two hostages to be released, at a point three and a half miles south and a mile and a half east of Mason City. Asked if she would be able to identify any of the men, Mrs. Clark said, "I sure would; especially the one who winked at me."

The Buick was found in a gravel pit about four miles south of the city later that evening. According to police, two cars had been waiting for the gang, with one driver in each vehicle.

Once the gang made it back to St. Paul, Green showed up at Pat Reilly's, 27-year-old fringe gang member, husband and father, and also bartender at St. Paul's Green Lantern, asking him if he knew where Dr. (Nels) Mortensen's home in St. Paul was, and requested that he accompany him to see the doctor. Reilly later stated to agents that at that time Eddie Green was driving a Hudson and that Dillinger and Hamilton were in the back seat; that both individuals had gunshot wounds in the shoulders and that Dillinger appeared to be nauseated and slightly dizzy. All four proceeded to Mortensen's home at 2252 Fairmount Avenue in St. Paul, arriving just after midnight. Mortensen answered the call in his night clothes. He examined both men, probing the wounds. Reilly said that during this time Dillinger was "quite ill and wobbly or faint" and had to sit down on the couch. Mortensen told them the wounds were not serious and that he did not have his medical bag there. He asked them if they had any liquor. They replied in the affirmative. He instructed them to go home and take a stiff drink and to return to his office the next day. They did not appear. The four returned to Green's car and drove to the intersection of Snelling and Selby, where Green gave Reilly a $5 bill and let him out of the car. Reilly said he hailed a taxi from Blue & White and then returned home.

Eddie Green was later questioned by the FBI, and gave the names of the two doctors to them while in a critical state in the hospital.

Proceeding the events of the Mason City, Iowa robbery, John Dillinger and his crew reached for safety at Little Bohemia Lodge, located in northern Wisconsin. The owner of the lodge grew suspicious after seeing the behavior of the group of men, and tipped the FBI. Three FBI agents positioned themselves about the cabin, and waited. Eventually, the agents opened fire on the lodge towards the gangsters, and Dillinger and his crew decided to flee through the woods after returning fire briefly. They escaped, and with no casualties.

=== Little Bohemia Lodge ===
Very early on April 20, Van Meter, Marie Comforti ("Mickey"), and Pat Reilly were the first to arrive at Little Bohemia Lodge in the town of Manitowish Waters in northern Wisconsin. Emil Wanatka, who had opened the resort four years prior, greeted them. Arriving later, were Dillinger, Hamilton, and Cherrington by way of Sault Ste. Marie, Michigan. Then Nelson and wife Helen, came in from Chicago. and last to arrive were Tommy Carroll and Jean Delaney. Reilly stated that on that first night he, Carroll, Lester Gillis (Nelson), Dillinger, and Emil Wanatka played hearts till around midnight. He went to the bar while the others went to their rooms. Hamilton and Pat Cherrington had the end room on the left upstairs, while Van Meter and Comforti had the room opposite. Tommy Carroll and Jean Delaney, together with Gillis and Helen, occupied the little cottage on the right of the lodge driveway. Dillinger had the room on the left at the top of the stairs in the main lodge. Reilly stated to agents that Van Meter told him that Dillinger's room had two beds and that he and Dillinger would share the room. Reilly stated that as he entered the room, Dillinger was lying on the bed on the left side of the room, reading with a bottle of whiskey on the stand near the bed. That as he entered Dillinger laid his magazine on the table, but nothing was said. He noticed when Dillinger turned over he had a .45 automatic under his pillow. Reilly stated that Dillinger then took a drink. That he himself, then locked the door, turned out the light, and went to bed on the right-hand side of the room.

The gang had assured the owners that they would give no trouble, but they monitored the owners whenever they left or spoke on the phone. Emil's wife Nan and her brother managed to evade Baby Face Nelson, who was tailing them, and mailed a letter of warning to a U.S. Attorney's office in Chicago, which later contacted the Division of Investigation. Days later, a score of federal agents led by Hugh Clegg and Melvin Purvis approached the lodge in the early morning hours. Two barking watchdogs announced their arrival, but the gang was so used to Nan Wanatka's dogs that they did not bother to inspect the disturbance. It was only after the federal agents mistakenly shot a local resident and two innocent Civilian Conservation Corps workers as they were about to drive away in a car that the Dillinger gang was alerted to the presence of the FBI. Gunfire between the groups lasted only momentarily, but the whole gang managed to escape in various ways despite the agents' efforts to surround the lodge.

J. J. Dunn, Dakota County Sheriff, received a call from the Department of Justice at 3:40 a.m. on April 23, giving notice that the gang might be headed his way in a Model A, Wisconsin plate No. 92652. Dunn gathered a posse that included deputy sheriffs Joe Heinen, Norman Dieters, and Larry Dunn, with Hastings night policeman Fred McArdle. The coupe was spotted six hours later, shortly after 10 a.m., entering the city from the south on Highway 3, then "turned at the drug store corner to cross the high bridge, in the direction of St. Paul." The officers used Heinen's Buick sedan in the pursuit, with Heinen driving and McArdle armed with a .30-30 and Dieters a .30-40. A large cattle truck slipped between the officers' car and the Model A, and Heinen was unable to pass the truck until he reached the opposite side of the spiral bridge. Upon leaving the north end of the bridge, the bandit car was seen climbing the hill a half a mile across the valley. The Buick started to creep up on the trio. McArdle and Dieters fired warning shots outside their windows as the two cars were leaving St. Paul Park. Dillinger, the middle passenger, with Van Meter driving, returned fire with his .45 through the rear window of the coupe. As the cars roared up the highway toward Newport, approximately 50 shots were exchanged. The chase that started near St. Paul Park, according to the officers involved, was for about 20 miles, not 50, as it is usually reported.

McArdle fired the shot that inflicted the mortal wound to Hamilton. In describing the shot, McArdle said, "When the bullet hit the car, the coupe seemed to wobble for a minute and then we thought it was going into the ditch. The driver managed to keep it on the pavement, however, and after doubling back to St. Paul Park and crossing the highway toward Cottage Grove, they lost us in the hills." The car would soon be replaced before heading to Chicago to seek out medical attention for Hamilton. The trio had not slept at all the night before. It was also extremely cramped in the coupe with three people, one of them being mortally wounded, as the length of a Model A seat is only 39 inches across. Much has been written about the slowness of the Model A used in the escape (top speed about 45 mph or 72 km/h), but with a large part of the driving done in darkness, Van Meter would not have been going much faster than 40–45 mph (64–72 km/h) in any car, since headlight systems in all cars of the period were notoriously inadequate. High speed at night was simply too dangerous. It was unfortunate for Dillinger, Van Meter and Hamilton that they did not ditch the coupe for a faster car at daybreak. It was probably impossible to do so.

Hamilton was taken by Dillinger and Van Meter to see Joseph Moran in Chicago, though Moran refused to treat Hamilton. He died at a Barker-Karpis hideout in Aurora, Illinois, three days after the shooting near Hastings. Dillinger, Van Meter, Arthur Barker, Volney Davis, and Harry Campbell, members of the Barker-Karpis gang, buried him in Oswego, Illinois.

In early May, Dillinger paid a visit to Fred Hancock at 3301 East New York Street, Indianapolis (the Shell filling station where Hubert and Fred worked), and gave him $1,200 in cash. Fred Hancock:

It was on Thursday, May 10, that I next saw John. A fellow came into the station between 5:00 and 4:00 p.m. on this date dressed in overalls, wearing glasses, no coat, wearing a sleeveless jacket. He was unshaven, and this party stood by the kerosene drum. I did not recognize him at the time and continued to wait upon a customer who was in the station, and then walked into the filling station house, thinking that this party standing by the kerosene drum was a kerosene customer. This party then walked over to the filling station house and knocked on the window to attract my attention. When I looked at him more closely I realized that it was John. He left with me a package containing money and told me where to take it. He said to tell Dad if anything happened to him to give Billie some of that money. He gave me $1,200 made up in four packages – $500 for Grandpa, $500 for my mother, Audrey Hancock, $100 for Hubert and $100 for myself, and I personally delivered this money to the people it was intended for. John told me how 'hot' he was. This was after the time the shooting had occurred at Little Bohemia Lodge in Wisconsin. He said he would return in two weeks. He was walking at the time, and I do not know how he came into the station. When leaving, he walked out of the station and walked south on LaSalle Street to Washington Street. The money was all made up of one-, five- and ten-dollar bills. There were very few ten-dollar bills in the money, it being mostly ones and fives. I used the $100 John gave me in connection with some work I was having done on the eyes of my little girl, and I understand that Mother and Grandpa later paid out the $500 they each received to some attorney, possibly John [sic] Ryan, in connection with John's case.

Agent Whitson had been observing the activity at the Shell station on the corner of New York and LaSalle. Whitson:

On 5-10-34 [May 10, 1934] I noticed a stranger talking to Fred Hancock near the kerosene drum in the yard of the station at about 3:45 p.m. He was wearing blue overalls, brown vest, blue shirt and tie, dark hat, and wore spectacles, either rimless or with a thin metal rim. His complexion was ruddy and he had a stubble of beard. In his right hand he carried at all times what appeared to be a pint milk bottle wrapped in newspaper. About 3:50 p.m. the stranger left the station, going south on LaSalle Street toward Washington Street. Agent noted that the man appeared to have a deep cleft in his chin, and decided to follow him and have a better look at him. Agent reached the street without being observed by Hancock and followed the stranger, who was walking rapidly and without any noticeable lameness or infirmity in either leg. The man turned west on Washington Street when Agent was still between 25 and 30 yards behind him. When agent reached the street intersection, the man was nowhere in sight.

On May 24, it is alleged that Van Meter killed East Chicago patrolmen Francis Mulvihill and Martin O'Brien who had tried to pull them over. On June 7, Tommy Carroll was shot and killed by police in Waterloo, Iowa. Dillinger and Van Meter reunited with Nelson a week later and went into hiding.

On June 30, Dillinger, Van Meter, Nelson, and an unidentified "fat man" robbed the Merchants National Bank in South Bend, Indiana. The identity of the "fat man" has never been confirmed; it is widely suspected that he was one of Nelson's associates, or, as suggested by Fatso Negri to the BOI, Pretty Boy Floyd. During the robbery, a police officer named Howard Wagner was killed when Van Meter shot him in the chest as he responded to the sound of a burst of submachine gunfire coming from inside the bank. Van Meter was shot in the head during the resulting shootout, and was seriously wounded.

=== Green Lantern Tavern ===
The Green Lantern speakeasy opened for business in 1928. It was located at 229 E 6th St. in St. Paul Minnesota. It became notorious for being a favorite hangout for prohibition crime figures including the Dillinger gang. In 1933 two members of the gang, Tommy Gannon and William Albert "Pat" Reilly, took over its operations. The details of the how and why of that transaction are undocumented, but "Pat" Reilly was one of the Tavern's bartenders. Kay Glispie (Canadian), was a waitress there that at that time, said she was only to approach customers when summoned to their tables.
