= Mary Kinder =

American gun moll (1909–1981)

Mary Northern Kinder (August 29, 1909 – May 21, 1981) was a Prohibition era gun moll, most noted for being the girlfriend of Harry Pierpont and associate of John Dillinger. Along with Pearl Elliott, she was one of two women listed by the Chicago Police Department's Public Enemies list in 1933.

At one time, her brother, Earl, husband Dale Kinder, and sweetheart Harry Pierpont were all inmates at the Indiana State Prison at Michigan City, Indiana. Her other brother, Charles, as well as her brother-in-law, William Behrens, were also convicted bank robbers.

== Early life ==
She was born August 29, 1909, in Indiana, the daughter of Lewis W. and Viola J. (Tansey) Northern.

By the 1910 census, the family was residing in Washington Township, Morgan County, Indiana, where Mary's father's occupation was not listed.

By the 1920 census, the family was living at 1060 West McCarty Street in Indianapolis, Indiana, where Mary's father's occupation was listed as an engineer at a factory.

== Earl Northern Trial, Howard County, Indiana Circuit court, 1925 ==
Mary testified as a defense witness at her brother Earl Northern's trial that Northern was in attendance at a dinner party held by her aunt on March 27, 1925, giving the names of those in attendance.

== Suicide of father, 1925 ==
Mary, along with her mother, discovered her father's body at their Indianapolis home after hearing a report from a shotgun blast in the early morning of November 12, 1925.

== Michigan City prison break, 1933 ==
On September 26, 1933, Harry Pierpont, Charles Makley, John "Red" Hamilton, Russell Clark, Walter Dietrich, James "Oklahoma Jack" Clark, Edward Shouse, Joseph Fox, Joe Burns, and Jim Jenkins escaped from Michigan City, using pistols that Dillinger had smuggled into the prison. The escape had been carefully planned before Dillinger's parole by Pierpont, Hamilton and Dillinger.

After the prison break, Kinder was sought by police for her connection with the escapees. Authorities believed that she drove the automobile who brought the convicts to the home of Ralph Saffell, where they received food, clothing, and shelter. Mary's sister, Mrs. Margaret Behrens and the wife of William Behrens, was held as an accomplice for three days.

== Named to Public Enemies List, 1933 ==
Mary was one of two women, known to be associated with the John Dillinger gang, named to the Chicago Police Department's Public Enemies List.

== Association with Pierpont and Dillinger Gang ==
Mary accompanied Harry Pierpont during his subsequent flight from authorities. Pierpont was known to have a volatile temper and Mary was one of the few people that could make "the trigger man keep his cool." She accompanied Pierpont, along with John Dillinger, Billie Frechette, Russell Clark, Opal Long, and Charlie Makley to Tucson, Arizona in January 1934. The gang was attempting to lie low after a robbery in Chicago in which gang member John Hamilton was wounded. On January 22, 1934, a fire broke out at the Hotel Congress, where Makley and Clark were staying. They paid firemen $20 to retrieve their bags, which were loaded with weapons. The firemen were suspicious, as that was a large amount of money at the time and the bags were heavy. They subsequently saw Clark and Makley's pictures in a true detective magazine and alerted the police. The Tucson police pulled Pierpont and Kinder over and told Pierpont he had to accompany them to the police station to register his car, as it was a law that all cars had to be registered in Tucson. Inexplicably, Pierpont willingly followed them back to the station where they were then arrested. Kinder was held in jail but eventually allowed to post bond. Pierpont was sent back to the Michigan City Indiana prison he escaped from. Then they transferred to Lima Ohio to stand trial for the murder of sheriff Jess Sarber. The sheriff had been killed during the gangs break out of John Dillinger from the Allen County Jail on October 12, 1933. Pierpont was sentenced to die in the electric chair. Kinder did shows and interviews to raise money for his appeal, including participating in a carnival show. She attempted to shield Pierpont and downplayed his role in criminal activities. Pierpont and Makley attempted to escape from death row September 22, 1934. Makley was killed in the attempt and Pierpont was severely wounded. He was kept alive long enough to execute him and the date of his execution was changed so they could execute him before he succumbed to his injuries. He was carried to the electric chair, and was executed October 17, 1934.

== Later life and death ==
Mary struggled with alcoholism throughout her life. She began drinking while running with the Dillinger Gang. She died of emphysema and heart disease on May 21, 1981 in Plainfield, Hendricks County, Indiana. Mary died penniless and is buried without a marker.
