= Lena Pierpont =

Lena Pierpont (September 13, 1883 – October 21, 1958) was the mother of Prohibition gangster Harry Pierpont. Her fierce loyalty to her son and his compatriots led to her arrest on numerous occasions by police in an attempt to ascertain her son's whereabouts.

== Early life ==
Lena was born in Jay County, Indiana, to James Orcutt and Samantha E. Metzner. Lena was the second of four children. On her seventh birthday, her mother died. Her father later remarried and moved the family to Muncie, Indiana.

== Marriage and family life ==
At age 16, on November 27, 1899, in Muncie, Lena married Joseph Gilbert Pierpont (June 1881-October 6, 1961), whose father had migrated from Kentucky to the Muncie area in the late 1880s. In the 1900 census, Lena L. Pierpont was enumerated in Center Township, Delaware County, Indiana, married within the year.

Lena was the mother of three children: Fern (b. September 21, 1900); Harry (b. October 13, 1902); and Fred (b. July 5, 1906), all born in Muncie.

According to the 1910 census, the family was residing at 1145 McLain Street in Indianapolis, Indiana, where her husband's occupation was listed as a woodworker in a carriage factory. In the 1911 and 1912 directories of the city of Indianapolis, the family was living at 1234 Lee Avenue.

Lena's oldest child, Fern, died of tuberculosis in Indianapolis in 1919. The 1920 census shows the family was residing at 2113 Morris Street in Indianapolis.

== Family's trouble with the law ==
In 1921 in Indianapolis, Lena's son Harry was arrested for carrying a concealed weapon. He was held for ten days and then dismissed. Concurrent with his arrest, Harry was committed to the state hospital.

In the Record of Inquest for Harry Pierpont held on September 19, 1921, she stated that he had become sullen, suspicious and prone to outbursts after a severe head injury. Harry was committed to Central Indiana Hospital, the state hospital for the mentally ill, on September 21. Harry was diagnosed with dementia praecox of the hebephrenic type.

On March 12, 1922, Harry Pierpont was sentenced to the Indiana reformatory at Jeffersonville for a two- to fourteen-year sentence for assault and battery with intent to murder. Lena often visited the superintendent and told him about Harry's mental illness. She tirelessly campaigned for his release from prison, claiming he was insane. The parole board granted him parole on March 6, 1924.

After his release from prison, Harry worked in his father's sand and gravel business in Brazil, Indiana, for several months. Harry continued to associate with several known bank robbers, and may have robbed the Southwine Theater in Brazil, Indiana.

Harry was arrested in Detroit, Michigan, on April 2, 1925, and jailed in Kokomo, Indiana. Pierpont was alleged to be the leader in the robberies of the South Marion, Upland, and South Kokomo Banks in Indiana.

Lena and her husband came to Kokomo on Saturday, April 4, 1925, and arranged with the firm of Overman & Healy and Carl Bree to look after the interests of Harry when arraigned and to defend him in his upcoming trial. While Harry Pierpont was awaiting trial in Howard County, Indiana, Lena's other son, Fred Pierpont, was arrested for aiding his brother in an escape attempt, but was later acquitted of the charges. Convicted of bank robbery, Harry was sentenced to serve a sentence of 10 to 21 years, and fined $1000.

== Association with the Dillinger Gang ==
While serving his sentence at the Indiana Reformatory at Pendleton, Indiana, Lena's son Harry first met John Dillinger. Harry was the convict Dillinger looked up to the most. Harry caused the Pendleton Warden, A.F. Miles, so much trouble that he was transferred to the Indiana State Prison at Michigan City within two months after he attempted to drill through the bars of his cell in an escape attempt.

On September 26, 1933, Harry Pierpont, along with nine other prisoners, escaped from the Indiana State Prison, using guns smuggled into the prison by John Dillinger.

On October 12, 1933, Harry, along with Charles Makley, Ed Shouse, and Russell Clark rescued John Dillinger from the Allen County Jail in Lima, Ohio. During the rescue, Harry shot and killed Sheriff Jess Sarber.

On November 8, 1933, Lena's son, Fred, stood trial in Wapakoneta, Ohio, for the robbery of the First National Bank of St. Mary's, Ohio. The defense argued that Fred was mistaken for Ed Shouse, while the prosecution had witnesses that saw Fred behind the wheel of a car occupied by the bandits when it left St. Mary's. Lena and her husband, as well as Fred's wife, Mary, and son, Harry, were in attendance.

On November 20, 1933, Fred was taken into custody at his home in Leipsic, Ohio, and held in the Putnam County, Ohio, jail under instruction of Allen County Prosecutor Ernest Botkin. Two days later, he was transferred to the Allen County jail.

On November 28, 1933, Lena posted a $2500 bond and Fred was released from the Allen County jail. Fred had been held as a material witness for the first degree murder trial of Harry Copeland for the killing of Sheriff Sarber. Fred's original bond had been set at $10,000.

On December 14, 1933, Lena and Fred were arrested in Terre Haute, Indiana. Lena was charged with possessing an automobile bearing improper identification, and Fred was charged with vagrancy. Terre Haute police also seized two automobiles at a house occupied by the Pierponts, impounding $435 in cash and several papers in Lena's possession. Captain Matt Leach of the Indiana State Police questioned Lena about her son Harry's whereabouts. On December 15, 1933, Lena and Fred were released from the Terre Haute jail after posting $2,000 bond each.

After Harry's arrest in Tucson, Arizona, on January 25, 1934, and subsequent return to Lima, Ohio, for trial, Lena secured the services of city solicitor Charles W. Long to defend her son. This resulted in verbal fireworks at city council meetings.

On February 14, 1934, Lena was called before the Allen County grand jury. After entering a "not guilty" plea, Harry's trial date was set for March 6, 1934. "I'm still proud of the Pierpont name", Lena was reported to have said to a friend while in the courtroom.

On February 19, 1934, Lena addressed a large crowd at the Lima city council, defending solicitor Long's right to defend her gangster son. John Keville, president of the Citizens and Taxpayers League, had soundly criticized Long for taking the Pierpont case while still working for the city. Lena addressed rumors that Long had been paid in upwards of $10,000 to defend Harry and challenged anyone to present a member of the Pierpont family who possessed that amount of money. Keville had left the meeting before she spoke, and the council offered no comments on Lena's remarks.

Lena's husband, Joseph Gilbert Pierpont, who had been in ill health, appeared with her in Lima to confer with Harry's attorneys. It was reported that Lena had established temporary residence in Lima at the time.

Shortly before his trial, Harry filed papers with the court asking he be allowed to confer with his mother in order to arrange for the testimony of certain witnesses who could verify his alibi that he was not in Lima on October 12, the date of the slaying of Sheriff Sarber.

== Death ==
Lena died on October 21, 1958, in Lakeville, Indiana.
