= Pearl Elliott =

American madam

- Born: October 21, 1887; Hillisburg, Clinton County, Indiana
- Died: August 10, 1935 (aged 47); Clinton County, Indiana
- Occupation: Madam
- Known for: Associate of the Prohibition era gangster Harry Pierpont and later of the bank robber John Dillinger

Pearl Elliott (October 21, 1887 – August 10, 1935) was a notorious madam of Kokomo, Indiana, United States. She was best known as an early associate of the Prohibition era gangster Harry Pierpont and later of the bank robber John Dillinger. Along with the gun moll Mary Kinder, she was one of two women listed on the Chicago Police Department's Public Enemies list in 1933.

== Early life ==
Elliott was born October 21, 1887, in Hillisburg, Clinton County, Indiana, the daughter of John Newton and Mary Belle (Booker) McDonald. The family were residing in Ward 3 of the city of Frankfort, Clinton County, by 1900.

Elliott married Earl C. Crawford in 1907 in Coles County, Illinois. Her second marriage was to Charles E. McGath on December 20, 1911, in Logansport, Indiana. Her third marriage was to William Jasper Hughes on May 25, 1918, in Howard County, Indiana, and later that year the couple were living at 1601 North McCann, with Hughes' occupation listed as laborer. By 1920, they were living at 518 Union Street in Kokomo, where his occupation was listed as a buyer and seller of horses. The following year, they were still at the same address, but he was listed as a horse buyer.

Elliott's fourth and last marriage was to George "Dewey" Elliott.

== Operating Kokomo brothel ==
Elliott was well known to the local authorities in Kokomo, frequently appearing in the police blotter of the local paper, a record of arrests and other events at the police station. On November 30, 1929, she was a victim of a crime, when the radiator cap was stolen from her car while parked outside her residence, reported as 606 North Market Street. Elliott's home was raided by Kokomo police on the weekend of December 14, 1929, and she was charged with operating a house of ill fame. The case was later dismissed by Judge George Shenk in the city court.

In the 1930 city directory of Kokomo, Elliott and her husband were listed as residing at 606 North Market Street. On September 16 of the same year, Elliot, along with Mrs. John Kiefer and Miss Bernice Rose were guests of Mrs. Sylvia Clevenger of Terre Haute. Clevenger would later figure in dealings with the Dillinger gang of bank robbers.

On September 18, 1931, Elliott was one of eight people taken into custody during a police raid of 600 1/2 Washington Street, where she was listed as an old offender. She was charged with operating a disorderly house and pleaded guilty when brought before Judge Shenk. On December 22, 1931, Curly Keane, a local criminal who was arrested at Pearl's residence on North Washington Street, implicated himself in the robbery of a Peru grocery store. In the 1932 city directory of Kokomo, Elliott and her husband were listed as furnishing rooms at 714 1/2 North Washington.

== Association with Harry Pierpont ==
At the time of a robbery of the South Side State Bank in Kokomo in 1925, Elliott reportedly harbored the bank robbers Harry Pierpont, Ted Skeer and Earl Northern at her boarding house on the corner of Washington and Madison streets. Shortly after their escape from the Indiana State Prison at Michigan City on September 26, 1933, there were reports that Pierpont and other members of the gang were in Kokomo at Elliott's home. In a jailhouse interview, Pierpont denied that he had any use for Elliott since his robbery in Kokomo in 1925. He stated that he was in Kokomo the day after the prison break from Michigan City and visited Elliott's house on North Washington Street but did not find her there. She disappeared from the Kokomo area after the release of John Dillinger from the Lima, Ohio, jail by Pierpont and his associates. on October 12, 1933.

== Association with John Dillinger ==
Elliott was alleged to be a 'treasurer' and advance 'fixer' for the Dillinger gang. In December 1933, Harold Trimby, arrested by police in Milwaukee, reported that Dillinger had been in that city two weeks previously. Dillinger was reportedly in the company of Harry Pierpont, Russell Clark, Dewey Elliott and Pearl Elliott, and the gang were in Milwaukee trying to dispose of $40,000 in bonds obtained in a robbery at Racine, Wisconsin, on November 20.

On December 28, 1933, Elliott was listed on Chicago Police Department's Public Enemies List, with orders to 'shoot to kill' as an associate of Dillinger. Local police in Kokomo noted that she had been known to harbor criminals in the past, and just prior to the escape of the convicts from Michigan City, she had operated a barbecue north of Kokomo on Highway 31. On January 25, 1934, members of the Indiana State Police raided the boarding house formerly operated by Elliott, based on a tip that members of the gang were expected to be there. The raid took place just hours before Dillinger and the rest of his gang were captured in Tucson, Arizona.

On February 16, 1934, Elliott eluded Peru, Indiana, police who had stationed a road block on U.S. Route 31 upon reports from Kokomo police that she had been seen heading in that direction.

On March 24, 1934, a tip that a man resembling Dillinger was seen in Chicago travelling with a woman resembling Elliott failed to pan out. On April 5, 1934, Elliott was reportedly seen in Kokomo at a service station, where she was in the company of two men and was driving a Pontiac sedan. Kokomo police reported that she was not wanted by local police, Chicago or Wisconsin officials at the time.

On July 25, 1934, Elliott was reportedly seen in Mooresville, Indiana, at the funeral of Dillinger. A correspondent from the International News service stated that she was with four other women of the Dillinger gang. The women were believed to be Irene Williams, Margaret Behrens, "Babe" Longacre and Mary Kinder. Elliott was quoted as saying, "I came here for a last look at Johnny. He never threw me down and I wouldn't do it on him."

== Post Dillinger ==
In November 1934, news reports from Frankfort, Indiana said that Elliot was dying at her mother's home from an incurable disease. Her husband Dewey was reportedly living in Florida at the time.

== Death ==
Elliott died August 10, 1935, at her mother's home in Clinton County, Indiana. She was buried in Greenlawn Cemetery in Clinton County.

== Bibliography ==
- Polk (1918). Polk's Kokomo Indiana City Directory. Indianapolis, Indiana: R.L. Polk & Co.
- Polk (1921). Polk's Kokomo Indiana City Directory. Indianapolis, Indiana: R.L. Polk & Co.
- Polk (1930). Polk's Kokomo Indiana City Directory. Indianapolis, Indiana: R.L. Polk & Co.
- Polk (1932). Polk's Kokomo Indiana City Directory. Indianapolis, Indiana: R.L. Polk & Co.
