= Earl Northern =

American criminal

George Earl "The Kid" Northern (1903–1936) was a Prohibition-era bank robber and early associate of Harry Pierpont. He was the older brother of Pierpont's girlfriend, Mary Kinder.

== Early life ==
He was born in 1903 in Morgan County, Indiana, the son of Lewis W. and Viola J. (Tansey) Northern.

By the 1910 census, the family was residing in Washington Township, Morgan County, Indiana, where Earl's father's occupation was not listed.

By the 1920 census, the family was living at 1060 West McCarty Street in Indianapolis, Indiana. Earl was not listed as living with the family.

== Criminal career ==
=== Pierpont-Bridgewater-Northern gang, 1924–1925 ===
Northern was associated with a group of Jeffersonville ex-cons, led by Harry Pierpont, who were staying at a Kokomo, Indiana boarding house run by Pearl Elliott.

Pierpont was implicated as the ringleader of the gang who struck several Indiana banks. Newspaper reports indicated there were seven members in all, and all identified Pierpont as their leader.

Most members of the gang were arrested and convicted before Pierpont was arrested in Detroit in the spring. Mrs. Everett Bridgewater was arrested at her home in Indianapolis and sentenced to two to fourteen years; James Robbins arrested at Lebanon, Indiana; Marion “Red” Smith arrested at Indianapolis; George Frazer arrested at Marion; and Robert Morse arrested at Indianapolis were all given sentences of between ten and twenty years; and Mrs. Emily Morse pleaded guilty and was given a sentence from two to fourteen years. The round up of these bandits was reported as one of the biggest roundups of any gang of robbers in the state.

==== South Marion State Bank, Marion, Indiana, November 26, 1924 ====
At 2:45 in the afternoon of November 26, 1924, seven young, unmasked, well-dressed bandits held up the officers and two customers of the South Marion State Bank at Thirty-first and Washington streets in Marion, Indiana, robbing the bank of approximately $4,000.00 in cash. No one was injured, and not a shot was fired. Five men went inside, two stayed outside.

The leader of the gang walked in ahead of the others and ordered "hands up", forcing the cashier and bookkeeper into the vault. According to newspaper accounts, the gang had evidently studied the situation, knew the surroundings, and carried out their job with clockwork precision and uncanny accuracy.

After the robbery, the bandits jumped into a purring Nash motor car and sped off south. Sixteen towns in a fifty-mile radius of Marion were notified of the robbery, and to be on the lookout for a Nash car with yellow license plates. One report had them heading west on State Route 35, another report had them travelling east through Bluffton, Indiana at a high speed. A couple from Fairmount, Indiana reported seeing a car matching that of the robbers at three o'clock, traveling west through Hackelman, Indiana in the direction of Elwood, Indiana. Grant County Sheriff Bert Renbarger and his deputies stopped a Nash car matching the description at Sweetser, Indiana but the occupants were found to be out of town businessmen.

Initial reports indicated that based on the description of the bandits, they were believed to be the same gang who had robbed the Farmers National Bank at Converse, Indiana the week before. Sheriff Renbarger speculated the robbers might be from South Bend, Terre Haute, Chicago, or Logansport.

==== Citizens State Bank, Noblesville, Indiana, December 16, 1924 ====
Just before closing time on December 16, 1924, seven unmasked bandits made an unsuccessful attempt to rob the Citizens State Bank. The bandit's car drove up to the side of the bank and six men leaped to the sidewalk and ran into the building, brandishing revolvers.

While three robbers rushed to the rear of the bank to cover officials, the other three ordered several customers and the cashier to hold up their hands. The leader of the bandits cautioned his associates to listen for an alarm repeatedly. With a revolver near his head, bank President Dunn touched a button on the floor which started a burglar alarm. The bandits immediately ran out the door and sped away with nothing for their effort. The bandits headed north in a Cadillac bearing Indiana license plate 11829 at a high speed.

==== Shelby Hardware Store, Lebanon, Indiana, December 22, 1924 ====
On December 22, 1924, the John D. Shelby Hardware Store of Lebanon, Indiana was robbed of two rifles, two double barreled shot guns, one hammerless double barrel shot gun, two single shot rifles, one Marlin rifle, repeater, two Remington repeating rifles, eight pocket knives, one six inch barrel pistol, one 32 German automatic revolver, about fifty boxes of ammunition, four flashlights, several batteries, and other articles.

Boone County, Indiana Sheriff Joe C. Cain notified Grant County, Indiana Sheriff Renbarger of the list of items stolen from the Lebanon store and stated that the robbers were driving a Moon sedan, with the license 443-554, which was stolen from Indianapolis the night of the Lebanon robbery. The automobile belonged to George W. Killinger Jr. of 1922 North Pennsylvania Street in Indianapolis and was reported stolen on December 22.

==== Upland State Bank, Upland, Indiana, December 23, 1924 ====
At 3:45 in the afternoon of December 23, 1924, six armed bandits entered the Upland State Bank within fifteen minutes of closing time and robbed the bank of approximately $2500.00

The bandits attempted to lock the cashier and a female employee in the bank vault. Finding that the safe would not work, they began scooping all of the money in sight as well as all the money in sight in the safe, consisting of paper and silver. One of the bandits cautioned bank officials against making false moves under pain of having "hell shot out of them".

After getting all the money in sight, they quickly left the bank and hoped into a waiting automobile, in which the sixth bandit sat, and departed north out of Upland, where it was reported they turned west.

A good description of the men was secured by Deputy Sheriffs John Schell and Woody Smith, who conversed with the six men at a filling station at Highland avenue and Washington streets in Marion at about 2:30 in the afternoon that day. The men had been asking about the road to Hartford City and that they desired to find State Road 35.

The men were first noticed in Marion driving a Moon car, bearing the license plate number 443-554, which was seen driving the wrong way around the public square. The license number matched one that had been in town about a week before, when it ran a stop sign at Fourth and Nebraska streets and failed to stop when called on by the police.

Reports indicated that Sherriff Renbarger notified many surrounding cities and Indianapolis, as it was believed that the gang had a headquarters in that city and was the same crowd who attempted to hold up a bank at Noblesville, Indiana the week before.

The automobile used by the bandits of the Upland State Bank and the Lebanon hardware store was found abandoned in the mud at Kempton, Indiana on December 27, 1924. Authorities learned at the car became mired in the mud around 7:30 in the evening of December 23. The men walked to a local home and called a garage at Kempton. The garage worker started to take the men to Frankfort, Indiana at their request. Carrying shotguns, rifles, revolvers and satchels, the men changed their minds and asked to be dropped off at the edge of town at Lebanon, Indiana. The men told the garage mechanic they had been out hunting and were from Louisville, Kentucky and wished to get home for Christmas.

No one ever came back for the car, and authorities were notified.

==== Capture and confessions of Bandit Gang members ====
Late Saturday evening, December 27, 1924, James Robbins, 22, of Lebanon, Indiana, was arrested by local police after being seen flashing a large amount of cash. Robbins confessed to his involvement in the Upland State Bank robbery, the attempted robbery at Noblesville, and the robbery of the Lebanon hardware store.

Robbins' confession led to the arrest on December 29, 1924, of William Behrens, 20, of Monticello, Indiana. Behrens, when brought to the Grant County jail, at first denied any involvement in the Upland, Marion or Noblesville robberies, but changed his story and admitted his involvement in the Upland robbery when identified by the cashier and another witness. Both men denied any involvement in the South Marion bank robbery.

Robbins confessed that on December 22, they robbed the Shelby hardware store in Lebanon, then proceeded to Upland in a Moon car that had been stolen from Indianapolis the evening before. His share in the Upland robbery was between $300–$400. He stated that after the Upland robbery the gang separated.

Behrens was identified by Deputy Sheriff Schell as being one of the men in the Moon car when it was stopped in Marion two hours before the Upland robbery. Behrens later confessed to Sheriff Renbarger of Grant County to his involvement in the Upland robbery, and told where he had hidden part of the money in Monticello.

On Tuesday, December 30, 1924, a third member of the gang, Marion "Red" Smith, 22, of Springfield, Illinois was arrested in Indianapolis. Smith had been tracked down by an operative of the Webster Detective Agency of Indianapolis, and was arrested after returning via train from Springfield to Indianapolis. Smith admitted to taking part in the Upland robbery, but denied being a part of the South Marion or Noblesville cases.

Information obtained from the three men indicated that the gang was planning a return attempt to rob the bank in Noblesville. Robbins spoke freely of his involvement and stated to the press that he became acquainted with all of the robbers while incarcerated at the Indiana State Reformatory.

Robbins and Behrens were arraigned December 30, 1924 in Grant County Circuit Court after 5 o'clock, where they entered guilty pleas, and were sentenced to ten to twenty years in the Indiana State Reformatory.

On Wednesday, December 31, 1924, Mrs. Mary Bridgewater, 29, was arrested in Indianapolis as an accomplice in the robbery of the South Marion bank. She denied having anything to do with the robbery, and claimed to not be with the gang when other robberies where committed. Mrs. Bridgewater had been visiting relatives in the southern part of Indiana and was not aware of the other arrests.

Mrs. Bridgewater did admit to being one of two women in the Nash car as it stood in front of the South Marion bank when it was held up. After the robbery, the group drove back to Indianapolis. Mrs. Bridgewater claimed that she did not receive any of the money from the robbery.

Marion "Red" Smith pleaded guilty in Grant County Circuit Court on December 31, 1924, and was sentenced to ten to twenty-five years for automobile banditry. Smith had just been released from the state reformatory five months prior, where he had been serving a term for vehicle theft.

On Friday, January 2, 1925, Robert Morse, 25, and his wife, Emily Morse, 27, of Indianapolis, were arrested by Sheriff Bert Renbarger and operatives from the Webster Detective Agency as part of the gang. Morse and his wife both admitted to being part of the gang of seven people, five men and two women, who took part in the South Marion robbery, but denied being a part of the gang at Upland or Noblesville. Morse claimed that he only received $153, instead of the $600 promised, as his share of the South Marion robbery. He admitted that the gang's original plan was to rob a bank in Hartford City, but the gang changed their mind and headed to Marion instead on November 26. Mrs. Morse, in contrast to Mrs. Bridgewater, admitted that she knew that the men intended to rob the bank.

On January 4, 1925, James Robbins, William Behrens, and Marion "Red" Smith were taken to the Indiana Reformatory to begin serving their sentences.

On January 10, 1925, George R. Frazer, 23, of Kokomo was turned into the Marion police by his father as being part of the bandit gang who robbed the South Marion and Upland banks. Frazer stated that Mary Bridgewater and Emily Morse knew all about the robberies, and that Mrs. Bridgewater had scouted out the South Marion bank by cashing a check just before the robbery. On the morning of November 26, four men, whom he knew from prison, picked him up in Kokomo and told him they were looking for some place to "stick up", but hadn't decided on a city.

Frazer was taken to the courthouse, a warrant was sworn out, he pleaded guilty to auto banditry, and was given a sentence of between ten and twenty-five years at the Indiana Reformatory.

==== New Harmony Bank and Trust, New Harmony, Indiana, March 10, 1925 ====
Shortly before four o'clock on March 10, 1925, four unmasked bandits walked into the New Harmony Bank and Trust in New Harmony, Indiana and robbed the bank of $10,000. The bandits locked the employees and customers into the safe and scooped up $6,000 in cash and $4,000 in bonds from the vault.

When the bank treasurer, Frank Steelman, failed to open the safe, he was hit with the butt of a pistol and suffered a severe scalp injury. The assistant cashier, Mrs. Schultz, opened the safe and then fainted.

The bandits escaped in a grey Hudson sedan in the direction of Evansville, being last seen near Wadesville.

A farmer near Griffin, Indiana reported that the men held him up and was commanded to tell them where they could obtain a boat to cross the Wabash River.

By March 11, reports had the gang spotted at King, Indiana in Gibson County. Peace officers throughout the midwest were wired descriptions of the men and advised to take no chances. Guards were placed along every road in southern Indiana with orders to 'shoot to kill'.

==== Robbery of A & P store, Fort Wayne, Indiana, March 21, 1925 ====
Fort Wayne police were investigating the gang's involvement in the robbery of an A & P store on March 21, 1925.

==== Stopped by police in Kokomo, Indiana, March 22, 1925 ====
On March 22, 1925, Harry, along with Everett Bridgewater, was arrested by Kokomo, Indiana police on suspicion of possessing a stolen car. However, the possession of the Ford roadster they were driving was found to be legitimate and they were released.

Pierpont later visited local attorney C.T. Brown, along with Dewey Elliott and Pearl Mullendore after midnight on March 22, 1925, to explain that two of his friends had been detained at the police station and needed representation. Pierpont, alias Mason, refused to give the names of his friends who were detained, but gave him a gold certificate worth $100.00. In the morning, the attorney learned that the suspects had been picked up for auto theft, but had later been released.

==== South Side State Bank, Kokomo, Indiana, March 27, 1925 ====
At 1:30 in the afternoon of March 27, 1925, five armed bandits entered the South Side Bank at Kokomo, Indiana in a bold daylight holdup. The bandits made off with $4828.40 in cash and $4300.00 in Liberty bonds. Escaping in a blue Moon touring car, the bandits were witnessed by local resident, J.E. Fernung, switching their car for two Ford cars, which then headed south.

Initial reports stated that an additional $2000.00 in non-negotiable securities had been stolen as well. Three local young men, who witnessed the robbery, reported that they did not raise the alarm because an apparent lookout eyed them closely while they were at the store across from the bank. The lookout quickly disappeared into the crowd after the robbery. The robbery took fifteen minutes, and after cleaning out the bank of valuables, the bandits calmly walked to their car.

The bank cashier, A.E. Gorton, reported that three bandits entered the bank, forced the employees to a back room, and while one bandit guarded them, the other two gathered all the money in sight. A gun was put to Gorton's head and he was forced to open the vault. Gorton, who had difficulty with the safe's combination, angered the bandit, who threatened "to blow his brains out."

While the bandits were working, a local resident, Vernon Shaw, entered the bank and was quickly relieved of the $18 he was carrying. "Speedy", a small terrier, boldly attacked a burglar's ankle, but was kicked into the basement. The bandits tore the telephone from the wall, broke a shotgun and took away the extra cartridges.

The blue Moon car used in the robbery was reported stolen the night before from Fort Wayne, Indiana, yet bore the license plate of a Chrysler Phateon reported stolen in Indianapolis on March 11. The vehicle was located six miles east of town with the rear riddled with bullets. The automobile was owned by Barrett M. Woodsmall of Indianapolis.

==== Laketon State Bank, Laketon, Indiana, March 31, 1925 ====
Early on the morning of March 31, 1925, the Laketon State Bank in Laketon, Indiana was robbed by two unmasked burglars. Taking between $1,000 and $1,800 in cash, the bandits overlooked several thousand dollars in bonds. Reports of the bandits tracked them fleeing in two autos to Warsaw, Indiana, but failed to generate new leads. Due to the similarity of the robberies and its location, Pierpont and his gang were suspected.

Wabash County Sheriff Summerland went to Marion in response to call from the Grant County sheriff. Other clues had the bandits stopping in Lagrange County, Indiana, where there were reports of three men in a Willys-Knight car.

At 9 o'clock in the morning, two youthful robbers, armed with revolvers, walked into the bank and looted the cash drawers while holding the cashier and assistant cashier at bay. After leaving the bank, they sped away in a Ford touring car and headed north before any alarm could be given.

The Laketon bank cashier gave a description of the robbers and stated they were driving a Willys-Knight car. It was ascertained that the license plate on the Willys-Knight car had been stolen from a Buick car the previous week in Fort Wayne. The plates belonged to a salesman from Lagrange who worked out of Fort Wayne, and were reported stolen the week before. The license plate numbers used by the bandits were discovered by a farmer, who lived near where the bandits had left the Willys-Knight and where the returned in their Ford coupe after they had stolen the money. The Ford touring car was stolen in Milford, Indiana.

=== Arrest, 1925 ===
On April 28, 1925, Northern was arrested at Indianapolis by operatives of the Pinkerton agency. Police believed that Northern was the brains behind the outfit that had struck a number of banks recently in Indiana, particularly the South Kokomo bank on March 27.

Police had been trying to track down an individual known as "The Kid", but until recently had not been able to connect the nickname to Northern.

Police speculated that Northern and several companions had recently attempted to visit Harry Pierpont at the Pendleton reformatory on April 17 at the time Pierpont was in Howard County circuit court to testify. It was believed that Northern was planning an attempt to free Pierpont.

==== Trial, Howard County, Indiana Circuit Court ====
On June 2, 1925, Northern went on trial in the Howard County Circuit Court for the robbery of the South Kokomo bank. Witnesses for the prosecution included A.E. Gorton, cashier of the bank, and representatives of the New Harmony State bank.

Jurors were questioned whether they had read accounts of the trials of Harry Pierpont and Thaddeus Skeer, charged as principals in the South Kokomo bank robbery. Judge Marshall sustained the motion of the defense filed requiring the state to proceed to trial on the charge of robbery, instead of being a habitual criminal.

On June 5, 1925, the circuit court jury returned a verdict of not guilty to the charge of being a habitual criminal, though two hours before, the jury found him guilty of bank robbery as a principal in the South Kokomo robbery.

The hearing was unprecedented in Howard county and without judicial landmark of procedure in Indiana.

Indianapolis police officials had presented evidence that Northern was identical with the same Northern who was twice convicted in Indianapolis of taking automobiles. For both cases, Northern spent time in the reformatory.

The defense argued that it would be unfair to single out Northern with a life sentence, when neither Pierpont or Skeer received such harsh sentences, and described Northern's earlier convictions as youthful indiscretions. The fourth principal, Everett Bridgewater, remained at large.

Northern was identified by Frances Gorton, witness for the state, because of the peculiar way he spoke, out of the side of his mouth like a sneer.

=== Sentenced to Indiana State Reformatory, Pendleton, Indiana ===
Northern received a sentence and was transported to the Indiana State Reformatory at Pendleton by Sheriff Lindley.

=== Suicide of father, 1925 ===
Northern's sister Mary, along with her mother, discovered her father's body at their Indianapolis home after hearing a retort from a shotgun blast in the early morning of November 12, 1925.

=== Bank robbery, Amo, Indiana, 1932 ===
Northern confessed he was one of the bandits who robbed the Amo State Bank at Amo, Hendricks County, Indiana on April 27, 1932. The confession did not implicate William Behrens and his wife, Margaret, both of Detroit, Michigan, who were being held in connection with the case. Behrens had been identified by bank officials as one of the bandits.

=== Sentenced to Indiana State Prison, Michigan City ===
Northern was given a sentence of ten to twenty-five years for the robbery.

Suffering from the effects of tuberculosis, his sister, Mary Kinder, made repeated efforts to have him released or transferred to a sanitarium. Mary appealed to Capt. Matt Leach of the Indiana State Police, who referred her to Governor McNutt.

== Death ==
Earl died in 1936 of tuberculosis while an inmate in the Michigan City, Indiana State Prison.
