= Fred Pierpont =

American criminal

- Born: July 5, 1906; Muncie, Indiana
- Died: 1940 (aged 33–34)

Fred Pierpont (July 5, 1906 – 1940) was the younger brother of Prohibition era gangster Harry Pierpont. He was often suspected and arrested for being a front man for his brother's bank robberies.

== Early life ==
Born in Muncie, Indiana, to Joseph Gilbert and Lena (Orcutt) Pierpont, Fred was the youngest member of the family, which included an older sister, Fern.

== Arrest and acquittal ==
On April 21, 1925, Pierpont was arrested and held in the Clay County, Indiana, jail in connection with the robbery of the Laketon State Bank in Laketon, Indiana. Detectives intended to interrogate him to determine if he was related to Harry, held at the time for the robbery of the South Side State Bank in Kokomo, Indiana.

On May 18, 1925, Pierpont was acquitted by the circuit court of Howard County, Indiana, on charges he aided his brother Harry in an escape attempt from the Howard County jail.

== Death ==
Pierpont died in 1940 in an automobile accident.
