= Harry Pierpont =

American gangster, murderer and bank robber

- Mug shot of Harry Pierpont
- Born: October 13, 1902; Muncie, Indiana, U.S.
- Died: October 17, 1934 (aged 32); Ohio State Penitentiary, Ohio, U.S.
- Parent(s): Joseph Gilbert and Lena (Orcutt) Pierpont
- Status: Executed by electrocution
- Convictions: First degree murder Bank robbery
- Penalty: Death

Harry "Pete" Pierpont (October 13, 1902 – October 17, 1934) was a Prohibition era gangster, convicted murderer and bank robber. He was a friend and mentor to John Dillinger.

Described as handsome and soft-spoken, Pierpont was a bright, natural-born leader. Fiercely loyal, he had a reputation for taking care of those around him and not squealing on his friends. He disliked publicity, and was content to let others, especially Dillinger, take credit for the bold bank robberies committed after the Michigan City prison break.

Pierpont was executed in the electric chair on October 17, 1934.

== Early life ==
Pierpont was born in Muncie, Indiana, to Joseph Gilbert and Lena (Orcutt) Pierpont. Harry Pierpont was the middle child with an older sister Fern (b. September 21, 1900), who died of tuberculosis when he was a teenager, and a younger brother Fred (b. July 5, 1906). His father was from Kentucky, and his mother, from Jay County, Indiana, was of German ancestry.

By the 1910 census, the family was residing at 1145 McLain Street in Indianapolis, Indiana, where Harry's father's occupation was listed as a woodworker at a carriage factory. In the 1911 and 1912 directories of the city of Indianapolis, the family was living at 1234 Lee Avenue.

Pierpont graduated from the eighth grade at Assumption School in Indianapolis. He had above-average intelligence and did well in school.

By the 1920 census, the family was residing at 2113 Morris Street in Indianapolis, Indiana, where Harry's occupation was listed as a bench worker at an automobile plant.

Pierpont's troubles with the police began after an accident in the summer of 1921, in which he received a severe head injury. His demeanor was changed after the accident, and Pierpont complained of eye problems, dizziness, and headaches. Pierpont displayed bouts of sleeplessness and mania for firearms. He stood over six feet (1.8 m) tall, with light brown hair and blue eyes. The second and third toes of his feet were grown together.

At his May 1925 trial in Kokomo, his place of residence was never clearly established. He was said to have lived in Fort Wayne, Toledo, and Indianapolis, and was known to have hung around Kokomo for some time before the bank robbery was framed.

== Criminal career ==
=== Carrying concealed weapon, 1921 ===
In 1921 at Indianapolis, Pierpont was arrested for carrying a concealed weapon. He was held for ten days and then dismissed. Concurrently with his first arrest, Pierpont was committed to the state hospital.

In the record of Inquest held on September 19, 1921, his mother stated that he became sullen, suspicious, and prone to outbursts after his injury and, two days later, he was committed to the state hospital for the mentally ill, Central Indiana Hospital. Pierpont was diagnosed with dementia praecox of the hebephrenic type.

=== Robbery of Cook Hardware Store, Greencastle, Indiana, January 1922 ===
On January 2, 1922, Pierpont stole an automobile in Indianapolis and drove to Greencastle, where he robbed the Cook Hardware store, stealing nine handguns.

Five days later, Pierpont was arrested in Indianapolis for attempted auto theft and battery with intent to kill. The owners of the automobile, Mr. and Mrs. Devine, caught him in the act. Struggling with Mr. Devine, Pierpont fired a gun, slightly wounding him. Mrs. Devine was holding a roast, and hit Pierpont over the head with it.

While being held in jail at Terre Haute, Pierpont failed in an escape attempt, sawing through the bars of his cell.

=== Sentenced to Indiana State Reformatory ===
On March 12, 1922, Pierpont entered the Indiana reformatory for a two to fourteen-year sentence for assault and battery with intent to murder. On November 17, 1923, Pierpont was transferred to the newly built reformatory at Pendleton, Indiana.

On May 1, 1923, Indiana Governor Warren T. McCray denied Pierpont's request for clemency. The superintendent of the prison wrote that Harry was "as wild as a March Hare".

==== Parole granted, 1924 ====
Pierpont's mother Lena often visited the superintendent and told him about Pierpont's mental illness. Pierpont's mother campaigned for his release, claiming that he was insane. The parole board granted him parole on March 6, 1924.

After his release, Pierpont worked in Brazil, Indiana, where, during his first stint in prison, his family had moved; his father operated a sand and gravel business for several months. He continued to associate with several known bank robbers, and may have robbed the Sourwine Theater in Brazil.

=== Pierpont-Bridgewater-Northern gang, 1924–1925 ===
By November 1924, Pierpont was living in Kokomo, Indiana, staying at a boarding house run by Pearl Elliott. He continued to associate with a group of Jeffersonville ex-cons.

In April, 1925, Pierpont was implicated as ringleader of a gang that struck several Indiana banks. Newspaper reports indicated there were seven members of the gang, and all identified Pierpont as their leader.

Most members of the gang were arrested and convicted before Pierpont was arrested in Detroit in the spring. Mrs. Everett Bridgewater was arrested at her home in Indianapolis and sentenced to two to fourteen years; James Robbins arrested at Lebanon, Indiana; Marion "Red" Smith arrested at Indianapolis; George Frazer arrested at Marion; and Robert Morse arrested at Indianapolis were all given sentences of between ten and twenty years; and Mrs. Emily Morse pleaded guilty and was given a sentence from two to fourteen years. Their arrests were reported as one of the biggest roundups of any gang of robbers in the state.

==== South Marion State Bank, Marion, Indiana, November 26, 1924 ====
At 2:45 in the afternoon of November 26, 1924, seven men led by Pierpont held up the South Marion State Bank at Thirty-first and Washington streets in Marion, Indiana, robbing the bank of approximately $4,000 in cash. No one was injured and not a shot was fired. Five men went inside, two stayed outside.

The leader of the gang walked in ahead of the others and ordered "hands up", forcing the cashier and bookkeeper into the vault. According to newspaper accounts, the gang had evidently studied the situation, knew the surroundings, and carried out their job with clockwork precision and uncanny accuracy.

After the robbery, the men jumped into a Nash motor car and sped off going south. Sixteen towns in a 50-mile (80 km) radius of Marion were notified of the robbery and told to be on the lookout for a Nash car with yellow license plates. One report had them heading west on State Route 35; another report had them travelling east through Bluffton, Indiana, at high speed. A couple from Fairmount, Indiana, reported seeing a car matching that of the robbers at three o'clock, traveling west through Hackelman, Indiana, in the direction of Elwood, Indiana. Grant County Sheriff Bert Renbarger and his deputies stopped a Nash car matching the description at Sweetser, Indiana, but the occupants were found to be out of town businessmen.

Initial reports indicated that based on the description of the bandits, they were believed to be the same gang who had robbed the Farmers National Bank at Converse, Indiana, the week before. Sheriff Renbarger speculated the robbers might be from South Bend, Terre Haute, Chicago, or Logansport.

==== Citizens State Bank, Noblesville, Indiana, December 16, 1924 ====
Just before closing time on December 16, 1924, the men made an unsuccessful attempt to rob the Citizens State Bank. The bandits' car drove up to the side of the bank, and six men leaped to the sidewalk and ran into the building, brandishing revolvers.

While three robbers rushed to the rear of the bank to cover officials, the other three ordered several customers and the cashier to hold up their hands. The leader of the bandits repeatedly cautioned his associates to listen for an alarm. With a revolver near his head, bank president Dunn touched a button on the floor, which set off the burglar alarm. The bandits immediately ran out the door and sped away with nothing for their effort. The bandits raced north in a Cadillac bearing Indiana license plate 11829.

==== Shelby Hardware Store, Lebanon, Indiana, December 22, 1924 ====
On December 22, 1924, the John D. Shelby Hardware Store of Lebanon, Indiana, was robbed of two rifles, two double-barreled shotguns, a hammerless double-barreled shot gun, two single-shot rifles, a Marlin repeating rifle, two Remington repeating rifles, eight pocket knives, a six-inch barreled pistol, a German .32 automatic revolver, about fifty boxes of ammunition, four flashlights, several batteries, and other articles.

Boone County Sheriff Joe C. Cain notified Grant County Sheriff Renbarger of the list of items stolen from the Lebanon store and stated that the robbers were driving a Moon sedan with the license 443-554 that was stolen from Indianapolis the night of the Lebanon robbery. The automobile belonged to George W. Killinger Jr. of 1922 North Pennsylvania street.

==== Upland State Bank, Upland, Indiana, December 23, 1924 ====
At 3:45 in the afternoon of December 23, 1924, six armed bandits entered the Upland State Bank within fifteen minutes of closing time and robbed the bank of approximately $2,500.

The bandits attempted to lock the cashier and a female employee in the bank vault. Finding that the safe would not work, they began scooping up all of the money in sight, as well as all the money in the safe, consisting of paper and silver. One of the bandits cautioned bank officials against making false moves under pain of having the "hell shot out of them".

After getting all the money in sight, they quickly left the bank and hopped into a waiting automobile, in which the sixth bandit sat, and departed north out of Upland, where it was reported they turned west.

A good description of the men was secured by Deputy Sheriffs John Schell and Woody Smith, who had conversed with the six men at a filling station at Highland Avenue and Washington Street in Marion at about 2:30 in the afternoon that day. The men had been asking about the road to Hartford City and that they wanted to find State Road 35.

The men were first noticed in Marion driving a Moon car bearing the license plate number 443-554, which was seen driving the wrong way around the public square. The license number matched one that had been in town about a week before, when it ran a stop sign at Fourth and Nebraska Streets, and failed to stop when called on by the police.

Reports indicated that Sheriff Renbarger notified many surrounding cities and Indianapolis, as it was believed that the gang had a headquarters in that city and was the same group who had attempted to hold up a bank at Noblesville, Indiana, the week before.

The automobile used by the bandits of the Upland State Bank and the Lebanon hardware store was found abandoned in the mud at Kempton, Indiana, on December 27, 1924. Authorities learned that the car had become mired in the mud around 7:30 on the evening of December 23. The men walked to a local home and called a garage at Kempton. The garage worker started to take the men to Frankfort, Indiana, at their request. Carrying shotguns, rifles, revolvers, and satchels, the men changed their minds and asked to be dropped off at the edge of town at Lebanon. The men told the garage mechanic they had been out hunting and were from Louisville, Kentucky, and wanted to get home for Christmas.

No one ever came back for the car, and authorities were notified.

==== Capture and confessions of Bandit Gang members ====
Late Saturday evening, December 27, 1924, James Robbins, 22, of Lebanon, Indiana, was arrested by local police after being seen flashing a large amount of cash. Robbins confessed to his involvement in the Upland State Bank robbery, the attempted robbery at Noblesville, and the robbery of the Lebanon hardware store.

Robbins' confession led to the arrest on December 29, 1924, of William Behrens, 20, of Monticello, Indiana. Behrens, when brought to the Grant County jail, at first denied any involvement in the Upland, Marion, or Noblesville robberies, but changed his story and admitted his involvement in the Upland robbery when identified by the cashier and another witness. Both men denied any involvement in the South Marion bank robbery.

Robbins confessed that, on December 22, they had robbed the Shelby hardware store in Lebanon, then proceeded to Upland in a Moon car that had been stolen from Indianapolis the evening before. His share in the Upland robbery was between $300 and $400. He stated that after the Upland robbery the gang separated.

Behrens was identified by Deputy Sheriff Schell as being one of the men in the Moon car when it was stopped in Marion two hours before the Upland robbery. Behrens later confessed to Sheriff Renbarger of Grant County of his involvement in the Upland robbery and told where he had hidden part of the money in Monticello.

On Tuesday, December 30, 1924, a third member of the gang, Marion "Red" Smith, 22, of Springfield, Illinois, was arrested in Indianapolis. Smith had been tracked down by an operative of the Webster Detective Agency of Indianapolis, and was arrested after returning via train from Springfield to Indianapolis. Smith admitted to taking part in the Upland robbery, but denied being a part of the South Marion or Noblesville cases.

Information obtained from the three men indicated that the gang was planning a return attempt to rob the bank in Noblesville. Robbins spoke freely of his involvement and stated to the press that he became acquainted with all of the robbers while incarcerated at the Indiana State Reformatory.

Robbins and Behrens were arraigned December 30, 1924, in Grant County Circuit Court after 5 o'clock, where they entered guilty pleas, and were sentenced to ten to twenty years in the Indiana State Reformatory.

On Wednesday, December 31, 1924, Mary Bridgewater, 29, was arrested in Indianapolis as an accomplice in the robbery of the South Marion bank. She denied having anything to do with the robbery, and claimed to not be with the gang when other robberies were committed. She had been visiting relatives in the southern part of Indiana and was not aware of the other arrests. She did admit to being one of two women in the Nash car as it stood in front of the South Marion bank when it was held up. She claimed that after the robbery, the group drove back to Indianapolis but that she did not receive any of the money from the robbery.

Marion "Red" Smith pleaded guilty in Grant County Circuit Court on December 31, 1924, and was sentenced to ten to twenty-five years for automobile banditry. Smith had just been released from the state reformatory five months prior, where he had been serving a term for vehicle theft.

On Friday, January 2, 1925, Robert Morse, 25, and his wife, Emily Morse, 27, of Indianapolis, were arrested by Sheriff Renbarger and operatives from the Webster Detective Agency as part of the gang. Morse and his wife both admitted to being part of the gang of seven people, five men and two women, who took part in the South Marion robbery, but denied being a part of the gang at Upland or Noblesville. Morse claimed that he only received $153, instead of the $600 promised, as his share of the South Marion robbery. He admitted that the gang's original plan was to rob a bank in Hartford City, but the gang changed their mind and headed to Marion instead on November 26. Mrs. Morse, in contrast to Mrs. Bridgewater, admitted that she knew that the men intended to rob the bank.

On January 4, 1925, James Robbins, William Behrens, and Marion "Red" Smith were taken to the Indiana Reformatory to begin serving their sentences.

On January 10, 1925, George R. Frazer, 23, of Kokomo, was turned into the Marion police by his father as being part of the bandit gang who robbed the South Marion and Upland banks. Frazer stated that Mary Bridgewater and Emily Morse knew all about the robberies, and that Mrs. Bridgewater had scouted out the South Marion bank by cashing a check just before the robbery. On the morning of November 26, four men, whom he knew from prison, picked him up in Kokomo and told him they were looking for some place to "stick up", but had not decided on a city.

Frazer was taken to the courthouse, a warrant was sworn out, he pleaded guilty to auto banditry, and was given a sentence of between ten and twenty-five years at the Indiana Reformatory.

==== New Harmony Bank and Trust, New Harmony, Indiana, March 10, 1925 ====
Shortly before four o'clock on March 10, 1925, four unmasked bandits walked into the New Harmony Bank and Trust in New Harmony, and robbed it of $10,000. The bandits locked the employees and customers into the safe and took $6,000 in cash and $4,000 in bonds from the vault.

When the bank treasurer, Frank Steelman, failed to open the safe, he was hit with the butt of a pistol and suffered a severe scalp injury. The assistant cashier, Mrs. Schultz, opened the safe and then fainted.

The bandits escaped in a grey Hudson sedan in the direction of Evansville, being last seen near Wadesville.

A farmer near Griffin, Indiana, reported that the men held him up and forced to tell them where they could obtain a boat to cross the Wabash River.

By March 11, reports had the gang spotted at King, Indiana, in Gibson County. Peace officers throughout the Midwest were wired descriptions of the men and advised to take no chances. Guards were placed along every road in southern Indiana with orders to "shoot to kill".

Fort Wayne police were also investigating the gang's involvement in the robbery of an A & P store on March 21, 1925.

==== Stopped by police in Kokomo, Indiana, March 22, 1925 ====
On March 22, 1925, Earl Northern, along with Everett Bridgewater, was arrested by Kokomo, Indiana, police on suspicion of possessing a stolen car. The certificate of title was in the name of Lester Isaacs of Indianapolis. However, the possession of the Ford roadster they were driving was found to be legitimate and they were released. This car was later identified as one that was used in the getaway from the South Kokomo bank robbery.

Pierpont, along with Dewey Elliott and Pearl Mullendore, later visited local attorney C.T. Brown after midnight on March 22, 1925, to explain that two of his friends had been detained at the police station and needed representation. Pierpont, using the alias Mason, refused to give the names of his friends who were detained, but gave him a gold certificate worth $100.00. In the morning, the attorney learned that the suspects had been picked up for auto theft but had later been released.

==== South Side State Bank, Kokomo, Indiana, March 27, 1925 ====
At 1:30 on the afternoon of March 27, 1925, five armed bandits entered the South Side Bank at Kokomo in a bold daylight holdup. The bandits made off with $4,828.40 in cash and $4,300.00 in Liberty bonds. Escaping in a blue Moon touring car, the bandits were witnessed by local resident, J.E. Fernung, switching their car for two Ford cars, which then headed south.

Initial reports stated that an additional $2,000.00 in non-negotiable securities had been stolen as well. Three local young men, who witnessed the robbery reported that they did not raise the alarm because an apparent lookout eyed them closely while they were at the store across from the bank. The lookout quickly disappeared into the crowd after the robbery. The robbery took fifteen minutes, and after cleaning out the bank of valuables, the bandits calmly walked to their car.

The bank cashier, A.E. Gorton, reported that three bandits entered the bank, forced the employees to a back room, and while one bandit guarded them, the other two gathered all the money in sight. A gun was put to Gorton's head and he was forced to open the vault. Gorton, who had difficulty with the safe's combination, angered the bandit, who threatened "to blow his brains out."

While the bandits were working, a local resident, Vernon Shaw, entered the bank and was quickly relieved of the $18 he was carrying. "Speedy", a small terrier, boldly attacked a burglar's ankle, but was kicked into the basement. The bandits tore the telephone from the wall, broke a shotgun and took away the extra cartridges.

The blue Moon car used in the robbery had been reported stolen the night before from Fort Wayne, yet bore the license plate of a Chrysler Phateon reported stolen in Indianapolis on March 11. The vehicle was located six miles (9.7 km) east of town with the rear riddled with bullets. The automobile was owned by Barrett M. Woodsmall of Indianapolis.

==== Laketon State Bank, Laketon, Indiana, March 31, 1925 ====
Early on the morning of March 31, 1925, the Laketon State Bank in Laketon, Indiana, was robbed by two unmasked burglars. Taking between $1,000 and $1,800 in cash, the bandits overlooked several thousand dollars in bonds. Reports of the bandits tracked them fleeing in two autos to Warsaw, Indiana, but failed to generate new leads. Due to the similarity of the robberies and its location, Pierpont and his gang were suspected.

Wabash County Sheriff Summerland went to Marion in response to call from the Grant County sheriff. Other clues had the bandits stopping in Lagrange County, Indiana, where there were reports of three men in a Willys-Knight car.

At 9 o'clock in the morning, two youthful robbers, armed with revolvers, walked into the bank and looted the cash drawers while holding the cashier and assistant cashier at bay. After leaving the bank, they sped away in a Ford touring car and headed north before any alarm could be given.

The Laketon bank cashier gave a description of the robbers and stated they were driving a Willys-Knight car. It was ascertained that the license plate on the Willys-Knight car had been stolen from a Buick car the previous week in Fort Wayne. The plates belonged to a salesman from Lagrange who worked out of Fort Wayne, and were reported stolen the week before. The license plate numbers used by the bandits were discovered by a farmer who lived near where the bandits had left the Willys-Knight and where they returned in their Ford coupe after they had stolen the money. The Ford touring car had been stolen in Milford, Indiana.

However, the cashier of the bank, E.L. Bright, and the assistant cashier, Mrs. Violet Ogden, later failed to identify Pierpont after his arrest in Detroit.

=== Arrest in Detroit, Michigan, 1925 ===
Pierpont, along with Thaddeus "Ted" Skeer and Skeer's girlfriend, Louise Brunner, were arrested by the Detroit police at their apartment on April 2, 1925. Pierpont was alleged to be the leader in the robbing of the South Marion, Upland, and South Kokomo banks. At his arrest, Pierpont gave his name as Frank Mason, but later in the day admitted his identity. Revolvers and guns were found under the pillows, in the closets and drawers of the bureaus. Harry was found to have $850 in new $100 and $50 bills on his person, and Brunner had a number of diamond rings and other jewelry, while one report indicated this amount was found on Skeer.

Other reports indicated that $4,000 in cash was found on Pierpont, with securities totaling $5,400 recovered in the apartment. Reports indicated that Pierpont, alias Mason, was wanted in Marion for the robbery of the Upland State Bank and the South Marion State Bank.

Police were tipped off to Skeer's involvement when it was learned that the auto used in the Kokomo robbery had been stolen from Fort Wayne a few days before. Skeer had been suspected in the automobile theft, and when the robbery was reported, police began working on the theory that Skeer was involved.

The three prisoners waived extradition and warrants charging petit larceny and bank robbery against Pierpont and Skeer had been issued by Kokomo city judge Joseph Cripe. Reports indicated Howard County prosecutor Howard Miller would pursue habitual criminal charges against both men, which would carry life sentences. Skeer had been sentenced from Allen County, Indiana, in 1917 to the state penal farm on a charge of larceny.

The Indiana Bankers Association had been looking for Pierpont since the robbery of the Grant County banks and had been on his trail for some time. Captain William Pappert of the Fort Wayne police department reported that Skeer had been seen at the Brunner woman's home with a large sum of money. When it was learned that Brunner intended to travel to Detroit to meet Skeer, detectives followed her to the apartment shared by Skeer and Pierpont where the arrests occurred. Skeer and Brunner were arrested when they met in the city, and Pierpont's arrest occurred a short time later.

Initial reports in the Marion newspaper could not verify that suspect Everett Bridgewater had also been arrested. Bridgewater's wife, Mary, had previously been arrested in connection with the gang's activities and was serving a term at the Indiana Women's Prison.

On April 3, James Roscoe "Whitey" Hayes, a third suspect, was also arrested by the Detroit police, but later released. Conflicting reports indicated that Hayes was wanted in Detroit as a material witness in a murder case.

In Detroit, Pierpont, Skeer and Hayes were all positively identified by A.E. Gorton, cashier of the South Kokomo bank; "Chic" Nelson, golf professional at the country club, and Vernon Shaw. It was Nelson who identified Hayes, a locally known singer, which allowed detectives to put the pieces together in tracking the members of the gang. Hayes had been identified by cashier Gorton as the bandit who stood in the doorway of the South Kokomo bank as it was robbed.

It was determined by the Kokomo police that members of the gang had been in the city for several weeks prior to the robbery of the South Kokomo bank. Pierpont, Skeer, and Hayes were known to have rooms with Pearl Mullendore at 718 North Main Street. Mullendore was more frequently known as Pearl Elliott, a notorious Kokomo madam, who would figure prominently in Harry's later career with Dillinger.

Members of the gang reportedly threw wild parties in Kokomo and Anderson, Indiana, where they displayed large sums of money to their women and spent "like drunken sailors".

Pierpont and Skeer were extradited to Kokomo for trial and held in the Howard county jail. They were brought back to Kokomo under heavy guard, coming from Detroit to Peru by train and then on to Kokomo by auto.

==== Escape attempt, Howard County jail ====
Police denied reports that Skeer confessed to the Kokomo holdup in order to spare his sweetheart, Louise Brunner. In his confession, it was alleged that he implicated Pierpont in the Kokomo, Noblesville, Upland, and Marion bank robberies.

While being held in the Howard County jail in Kokomo, an escape attempt by Harry and Skeer was thwarted with the discovery of ten saw blades in the cells. Pierpont had reportedly boasted when captured in Detroit that he would never be held for trial. Pinkerton operative, F.C. Huntington, found the saws when the prisoners were being examined in city court. One bar in Skeer's cell had been severed. Four saw blades had been used, and a bar in Pierpont's cell was found partially severed.

Harry's brother, Fred, was arrested on charges of aiding his brother's escape attempt, but was later acquitted of the charges.

==== Trial, Howard County Circuit Court ====
Pierpont's parents came to Kokomo from their home in Brazil, Indiana, on Saturday, April 4, 1925 and arranged with the firm of Overman & Healy and Carl Bree to look after the interests of Harry when arraigned and to defend him in his upcoming trial. Pierpont's attorneys did not yet admit that his name was anything other than Frank Mason, the alias given in Detroit.

On April 5, 1925, Pierpont and Skeer were taken into city court in Kokomo, where Howard County prosecutor Homer Miller announced to City Judge Joe Cripe that by agreement between him and the attorneys for the prisoners, the preliminary hearing might be set for Thursday (April 9) afternoon, and the judge agreed. Prosecutor Miller expected the prisoners to be bound over to the Howard circuit court, bonds to be fixed, and a hearing held before Judge John Marshall.

Howard County Sheriff Joseph Lindley adamantly denied reports that Pierpont and Skeer would be spirited away to another jail for safekeeping, presumably the Pendleton reformatory. Local reports indicated that citizens were concerned the ancient jail would be inadequate to hold experienced criminals Sheriff Lindley kept Pierpont and Skeer under heavy guard and denied visitors to the cellhouse for fear of a jail delivery.

Fort Wayne police reported that there was strong evidence that the trio of Pierpont, Skeer, and Hayes were involved in the holdup of the A & P store there on March 21, 1925.

On April 6, 1925, Louise Brunner of Fort Wayne, held as a material witness and girlfriend of Skeer, was released under bond and allowed to return to her mother.

Bond for the bank bandits was set at the sum of $10,000 each, and attorney C. T. Brown was engaged to defend Skeer.

On May 6, 1925, Pierpont took the stand and in a surprise defense move, practically admitted to all the evidence contained in Skeer's confession. Pierpont told of entering and holding up the bank and then fleeing to Fort Wayne, where the loot was divided among him and three others. However, Pierpont stated that Skeer was the planner of the robbery. Pierpont was convicted and sentenced to serve a sentence of ten to twenty-one years, and fined $1000.00.

=== Sentenced to Indiana State Reformatory, Pendleton ===
Found guilty, he was sent back to Pendleton and entered the Indiana Reformatory for the second time on May 6, 1925. He defied authorities by giving the wrong name, refusing to recognize the warden, declining to make a statement or having his picture taken, and spitting on a guard.

It was here that he first met John Dillinger and Homer Van Meter. In Pendleton, Pierpont was the convict Dillinger looked up to the most. Pierpont caused the Pendleton warden, A. F. Miles, so much trouble that he was transferred to the Indiana State Prison at Michigan City within two months, after he attempted to drill through the bars of his cell in an escape attempt. Dillinger and Van Meter were later transferred within the next few years to Michigan City.

=== Transfer to Indiana State Prison, Michigan City ===
Entering Michigan City on July 30, 1925, Pierpont became one of the most respected convicts (by other convicts) in the prison. He soon became the leader of an elite group of former bank robbers. Forever trying to escape, Pierpont constantly fought with the guards and was frequently confined to solitary confinement. He was known for his ability to withstand hunger and beatings. Pierpont headed a prison clique that included Russell Clark, Charles Makley, John "Red" Hamilton, and Dillinger, after the latter's July 1929 transfer. Harry's ability to endure hunger and beatings won him the respect of all the prisoners.

It was from these men that Dillinger learned the crime of bank robbery, and by 1933, with a parole for Dillinger, an escape plan was concocted. With Dillinger on the outside, he would rob several banks on a list composed by Pierpont and Makley, and with that money, help finance the escape.

==== Escape attempt, December 29, 1930 ====
On December 29, 1930, Pierpont was among a group of 12 men, led by Joseph Burns, who overpowered guard Guy Burklow and barricaded the doors of their cell block to prevent guards from entering. Pierpont let himself out of his cell with a homemade key.

Burklow was able to sound the alarm, and a combined group of city police, fireman, and guards were able to force the inmates to surrender. Burns had fashioned a key from a spoon, allowing the inmates to escape their cells. All the men were in Cell House D, and the break occurred at a time when the guard force was limited.

Others involved in the scheme besides Burns and Pierpont were Albert Roseberg, James Jenkins, Dick Day, Howard Ware, Maurice Delature, Frank Badgley, Louis West, Wayne Williams, Willard Tex, and Russell Clark, all of whom were serving long sentences for murder, bank robbery and other habitual offenses.

== Breakout from Michigan City ==
In the summer of 1932, Pierpont began to make plans for the greatest prison break in Indiana history. Pierpont's fellow conspirators were Charles Makley, John "Red" Hamilton, and Russell Clark. This operation would depend on accomplices on the outside who had money for guns, bribes, and a hideout. It would also need someone dependable on the inside who was about to be released. Pierpont approached John Dillinger about helping them to escape. In return, he would be offered the opportunity to join their bank-robbing team.

The group reportedly gave Dillinger the list of the best banks and stores to rob, as well as the names of reliable accomplices. He would know almost as much as they did about bank robbery. Dillinger agreed, but insisted that James Jenkins be included in the break.

In late 1932, Walter Dietrich joined Pierpont's group. He began to reveal the detailed techniques of the remarkable bank robber, Herman Lamm. By the spring of 1933, the plan was set.

Pierpont was aided on the outside by his girlfriend Mary Kinder, who agreed to help with the break-out if her brother, Earl Northern, was added to the list of escapees. Mary's brother, Earl Northern, was Pierpont's old partner. Pearl Elliott, the Kokomo madam who had been involved in Pierpont's Kokomo robbery, was to get money to those who would bribe prison guards.

=== Request for clemency, August 1933 ===
The Indiana state clemency commission heard Pierpont's appeal to be released from the state prison under the contention that he was a man of strong character and a "leader and not a follower" on August 24, 1933.

Briefs filed highlighted the fact that when Pierpont was sentenced to the state prison in May 1925, he had told authorities that he would try to escape and it was their duty to prevent it. Subsequently, he made three escape attempts. In 1931, Pierpont had announced that he would be a model prisoner and it was contended he has been such since that time. The commission was informed that Pierpont's record included two previous convictions. In his time in prison, he had received ten punishments, two reprimands, and one merit braid. The commission denied Pierpont's request for clemency.

On September 13, 1933, three loaded revolvers, wrapped in Chicago newspapers, were found near the west wall of the prison by two prisoners. Prisoners Danny McGeogehan, Jack Gray, and Eddie Murphy were believed to be connected and ordered into solitary confinement. Dillinger had tossed these pistols over the wall, and were intended for Pierpont and his conspirators.

=== Successful escape ===
On September 25, 1933, Pierpont, Russell Clark, Makley, and Hamilton conferred during the exercise period and decided to crash out on the next day. Each man swore an oath not to be recaptured without a fight.

The next morning, Pierpont, Makley, Hamilton, Russell Clark, Walter Dietrich, James "Oklahoma Jack" Clark, Edward Shouse, Joseph Fox, Joe Burns, and Jim Jenkins escaped from Michigan City, using three .45 caliber pistols Dillinger had smuggled into the jail. The escape had been carefully planned before Dillinger's parole by Pierpont, Hamilton, and Dillinger. Dillinger had spent the summer of 1933 robbing banks throughout Indiana and Ohio to raise enough money to smuggle the guns into the prison. How he smuggled the guns in is unknown: some accounts say that Dillinger tossed the weapons over the wall like he did on his previous attempt. The most widely believed theory is that Dillinger hid the guns in boxes of thread sent to the prison shirt factory.

After two o'clock that afternoon, Pierpont and Russell Clark told shirt factory superintendent George H. Stevens that one of the officials needed to see him in the basement. Stevens was soon overpowered by the rest of the gang. Walter Dietrich sought out deputy superintendent Albert E. Evans, telling him that a fight was in progress, leading him into the trap as well. Evans was greeted by seven men with pistols and three with clubs. Foreman Dudley Triplett came to the basement for supplies and was also soon captured.

Pierpont had received severe punishment at the hands of Deputy Evans while in prison, and now was prepared to exact revenge. Dietrich stopped him from killing him and letting the whole prison know what was happening.

The convicts took their hostages and began to walk carefully to freedom. Stevens led the way, with Dietrich on his left side and Hamilton on his right, their guns concealed beneath the stacks of shirts they were carrying. The other men picked up a steel shaft and followed. Though they walked almost the entire length of the prison, the guards and other prisoners paid no attention to what was happening.

When they arrived at the first steel gate, Stevens told guard Frank Swanson to open the gate because the prisoners were armed and would kill if he did not. Swanson was forced to join the procession. After proceeding through a second gate, they came to the third gate, where they used the steel shaft as a battering ram. Guard Fred Wellnitz was beaten, and Guard Guy Burklow was forced to open the outer gate.

Now the prisoners were in the lobby of the administration building, where they herded eight civilian clerks into the vaults. Seventy-two-year-old Finley Carson was shot in the leg and shoulder by Burns for not moving fast enough. Warden Louis E. Kunkel happened upon the group, and he was quickly made a prisoner as well.

Outside the gate, it was every man for himself. It was raining hard. The escaped prisoners ended up splitting into two groups. The first group included Dietrich, James Clark, Fox, and Burns. The second group included Pierpont, Hamilton, Russell Clark, Makley, Shouse, and Jenkins.

With the alarm sounding, the Dietrich group encountered Sheriff Charles Neel, who had just dropped off some prisoners. Overpowering him, they took his weapons, and forced him to take three of them in his automobile.

At a gas station outside the prison, attendant Joe Pawleski was struck over the head by the Pierpont group. The group commandeered another vehicle, releasing two women but forcing the driver to continue. They headed west for a few miles, hiding in a farmhouse around 2:30 p.m.

The convicts in Sheriff Neel's car purchased gas at Burdick, Indiana, about 20 miles (32 km) west of Michigan City. The group abandoned the sheriff's car near Wheeler, Indiana, after carjacking another motorist. The group roared off with the sheriff still their prisoner.

At almost midnight, Mary Kinder answered a knock at her door in Indianapolis and found Pierpont standing there. She immediately asked about her brother, Earl Northern. Northern was originally part of the escapee plan, but was ill in the infirmary at the time of the break. Mary had arranged a place for the escapees to stay at the home of Ralph Saffell, her reluctant boyfriend. The convicts sent Saffell and Mary downtown to buy civilian clothes.

Pearl Elliott soon arrived at the Saffell home and brought money. The convicts were ready to begin taking banks on their own, only to discover that Dillinger had been arrested in Dayton, Ohio, four days before the escape, and was being detained in the Allen County jail in Lima. The gang soon hatched a plan to free Dillinger.

The next evening, the gang was joined by Michigan City parolee Harry Copeland, Dillinger's partner before the arrest, who told the gang he had arranged for a house at 1054 South Second Street in Hamilton, Ohio. However, the hideout would not be ready for a few more days but he had found them temporary refuge.

When their hideout in Hamilton was ready, the group abandoned their car in Indianapolis and stole another to hide their tracks. Indiana State Police Captain Matt Leach became aware of the theft, and threw up a blockade that almost resulted in the gang's capture. During an attempt to getaway from the police, the door of their auto opened and James Jenkins fell out. The gang had to speed on, unable to wait on Jenkins, eventually stealing another vehicle before reaching their Ohio hideout. Jenkins was later killed that evening by a local posse near Beanblossom, Indiana.

The gang hid out at the farm of Pierpont's parents near Leipsic, Ohio, as well as at their hideout in Hamilton.

== Pierpont's tenure with Dillinger ==
=== First National Bank, St. Mary's, Ohio, October 3, 1933 ===
While in Hamilton, Pierpont realized that the group needed more money to help bust Dillinger out. Makley suggested they rob the First National Bank in his hometown of St. Mary's, Ohio, only a few miles away from Lima. Mary Kinder rejoined the gang and agreed to travel permanently with Pierpont.

On the morning of October 3, exactly one week after their escape, while the gang began loading into two cars for the robbery, Harry Copeland claimed he was too sick to drive, and Mary Kinder was asked if she would drive the second car for an equal share.

At 2:40 p.m., Makley entered the bank with Pierpont and Clark while Hamilton and Shouse waited nearby. The robbery netted almost $11,000. The bank had been closed by the Treasury Department, but had cash on hand to facilitate its re-opening. The gang had to wash and dry the money a number of times to eliminate the "new" feel of the bills in order to pass them.

On October 5, Ralph Saffell revealed the details of the gang's stay at his Indianapolis cottage to Matt Leach. Leach raided Mary Kinder's apartment, but was infuriated by the nonsensical answers given by her younger sister, Margaret Behrens.

On October 10, Pierpont brought Dillinger's girlfriend Billie Frechette to Ohio. He found an apartment in Cincinnati for her and Mary. The next day the men left for Lima.

=== Rescue of John Dillinger from Allen County Jail, October 12, 1933 ===
The gang arrived in Lima on Columbus Day. Pierpont and Clark approached a local attorney about getting Dillinger's "sister" into the jail for a visit. When the attorney told them he would talk to the sheriff the next day, the gang knew they had to act fast.

Pierpont, Makley, and Clark entered the jail around 6:25 p.m., while Shouse, Hamilton, and Dillinger's first partner Harry Copeland remained outside as a lookout. The gang members confronted Sheriff Jess Sarber, claiming to be Indiana State Prison officials and were there to return Dillinger to Indiana. When Sarber requested their credentials, Pierpont fired two shots, hitting Sarber once in the abdomen. Makley and Pierpont then beat Sarber, demanding the keys to Dillinger's cell. While Sarber refused, his wife dug the keys out of a drawer in order to stop the beating. The gang then freed Dillinger, locked up Sarber's wife and Deputy Wilbur Sharp, and the group escaped. Sarber died about ninety minutes later.

=== Days with the "Terror Gang" ===
Matt Leach suspected that Dillinger's rescue was related to the Michigan City jailbreak. He also suspected Pierpont was the brains behind the operations. Leach attempted to inspire friction in the ranks of the gang. During news interviews, he made a point of calling them the "Dillinger Gang", instead of the "Pierpont Gang". The ruse backfired, as Pierpont could not have cared less what people called the gang.

The search for the gang in Ohio had become so intense that, two days after freeing Dillinger, they decided to split into two groups and meet in Chicago.

==== Police station raids ====
On October 14, 1933, Dillinger, Pierpont, and Walter Dietrich raided the Auburn, Indiana, police station for guns and bulletproof vests.

Dillinger and Van Meter had posed as tourists at the Peru, Indiana, police station prior to Dillinger's arrest to scout out their arsenal. At about 10:00 p.m. on October 20, 1933, Dillinger, Pierpont, and Dietrich raided the Peru police station for more guns and bulletproof vests.

Officials now believed that the gang had declared war on the law, with some predicting the gang would break into the reformatory to enlist an army. The Indiana National Guard was put at the disposal of the state police, and volunteer posses were formed throughout the state. Meanwhile, the gang was quietly staying in expensive apartments in Chicago.

==== Central National Bank, Greencastle, Indiana, October 23, 1933 ====
Plans for the gang's first major robbery—of the Central National Bank in Greencastle—and escape routes had been sketched out by Pierpont. Makley scouted the area and learned it was homecoming weekend for DePauw University, and the robbery was planned for Monday, October 23.

At 2:45 p.m., a large Studebaker parked on a hill next to the bank and four men walked into the bank: Dillinger, Pierpont, Makley, and Copeland or Clark. Pierpont headed for one of the cages to change a $20 bill. When the teller told him to go to another window, Pierpont pulled his tommy gun out. The other gang members pulled out their guns and began clearing money from the vaults. Witnesses clearly identified Pierpont as the leader of the robbers. Five minutes later, the robbery was over, and the gang walked out with $74,000 in cash and bonds, without firing a shot. They were so quiet that no one at the police station across the street knew what had happened.

==== American Bank & Trust Company, Racine, Wisconsin, November 20, 1933 ====
With the Indiana State Police after them, the gang hid out in Chicago, with Dillinger, Pierpont, Mary Kinder and Billie Frechette sharing a flat at 4310 Clarendon Avenue. The gang moved freely about Chicago.

On November 16, one day after Dillinger and Frechette had escaped an attempted police ambush, the gang made the final details for the robbery of a bank in Racine, Wisconsin. At the same time, Copeland's drinking and Shouse's womanizing were causing friction within the gang. That afternoon, Pierpont, Makley, and Mary Kinder drove to the American Bank & Trust Company in Racine. Mary changed a bill while she cased the bank, and the gang then drove around exploring the best getaway routes.

Returning to Chicago, Pierpont suggested to the gang that Copeland be dropped as the driver and Shouse put in his place. Shouse had other plans to rob a bank on his own, and Mary Kinder overheard Shouse trying to convince Hamilton to join him. That evening the gang decided to get rid of Shouse, and the next morning they threw money at him and threw him out. On his way out, Shouse stole Clark's car and headed to California.

The morning of the robbery, the gang read in the paper about Copeland's arrest the evening before.

At 2:30 PM on November 20, Pierpont walked into the bank, carrying a Red Cross poster. He pasted it over the front window to block the view of the teller cages from the street. Makley, Dillinger, and Hamilton then entered the bank, and Makley yelled "stick 'em up" at one teller who was on the phone. When the teller, Harold Graham, failed to comply, Makley shot him in the elbow. As Graham fell, bleeding, he set off the alarm connected to the police station.

Pierpont ordered everyone in the lobby to lie on the ground while Dillinger marched the bank president, the cashier, and his assistant into the main vault at gunpoint. While the cashiers struggled with opening the vault, two police officers responded to the alarm. Pierpont got the jump on one, and Makley shot the other, wounding him. With the vault cleaned out, Dillinger and Pierpont rounded up the cops, three female hostages and a bank president as hostages. Using the hostages as shields, the gang marched out to their car, taking a woman, the bank president, and an officer with them. Makley also shot at two detectives who had responded. A few blocks later, when the car ran into traffic, the officer was tossed off the running board.

After safely leaving town with their hostages, the gang took the bank president and the female hostage to the woods, where they bound them loosely together. The gang asked them to stay there for twenty minutes.

==== Hiding out in Daytona Beach, Florida ====
Due to the unwelcome attention generated by their crimes and an incident in which Hamilton had killed a CPD detective, the gang and their women took a long vacation at a beach house in Daytona Beach, Florida, highlighted by a New Year's Eve barbecue which was climaxed by Dillinger emptying his Thompson submachine gun at the moon at the stroke of midnight.

==== First National Bank, East Chicago, Indiana, January 15, 1934 ====
On January 15, 1934, Dillinger and Hamilton robbed the First National Bank in East Chicago, Indiana. Pierpont waited in the car while the other two emerged with the money and hostages. They faced several cops who had taken up positions outside. One officer, William O'Malley, fired at Dillinger, but failed to injure him, as Dillinger was wearing a bulletproof vest. Dillinger returned fire, killing O'Malley. The other officers opened fire as Dillinger and Hamilton ran for the car, and Hamilton was wounded.

== Downfall and arrest ==
Heading out west to lie low, Pierpont, Dillinger, Makley, and Clark ended up in Tucson, Arizona. Flush with cash and careless, the gang made several minor mistakes which led to their being recognized and captured, one by one, on January 25, 1934. All four men and their girlfriends were extradited back to the Midwest; Dillinger to Indiana for O'Malley's murder, the other three to Ohio for Sheriff Sarber's murder.

=== Trial, Allen County Circuit Court, 1934 ===
Testimony from Shouse, one of the first members of the Dillinger gang, helped convict the others. In early March 1934, Pierpont, Makley, and Clark were convicted of the murder. While Clark got a life sentence, Pierpont and Makley were sentenced to die in the electric chair.

After Dillinger stunned the country by breaking out of the jail at Crown Point, Indiana, with a wooden gun on March 3, 1934, it was suspected that he would try to break his pals out of the death house in Columbus, Ohio. Elaborate precautions were taken to keep Pierpont and Makley locked up, on the assumption that Dillinger would show, but he did not, as he had teamed up with Baby Face Nelson.

=== Fatal escape attempt ===
With Dillinger's death at the hands of the FBI on July 22, 1934, and time running out for them, Makley and Pierpont resorted to other means to get off death row: they would try to duplicate their old friend's feat.

On September 22, 1934, exactly two months after Dillinger's death, Pierpont and Makley carved phony pistols out of soap cakes, and painted them black with shoe polish, and made their move. Brandishing the toys, they managed to get out of their cells and to the main door of the death house before rifle-wielding guards opened fire. Makley was mortally wounded and Pierpont was riddled with bullets. Although he survived, he was seriously injured.

=== Execution ===
Pierpont was executed at the Ohio Penitentiary on October 17, 1934. Still suffering from injuries incurred during his attempted escape, he had to be carried to the electric chair where he was successfully put to death, and pronounced dead at 12:14 a.m. His death certificate lists his age as 32 years and 4 days, with a date of birth of October 13, 1902 in Muncie, Indiana. His occupation was listed as former engineer and his marital status was given as "married". His mother, Lena Pierpont, of R.R. 2, Lakeville, Indiana, was the informant.

He is buried in the Holy Cross and St. Joseph Cemetery in Indianapolis.

== Other media ==
- In the 1973 film Dillinger featuring Warren Oates, Pierpont is played by Geoffrey Lewis.
- In the 1991 TV movie Dillinger, he is portrayed by actor Bruce Abbott.
- In the 2009 Michael Mann film Public Enemies, he is played by David Wenham.
- Handsome Harry: Or the Gangster's True Confessions (New York: HarperCollins Publishers, 2004), a novel by James Carlos Blake

== See also ==
- List of Depression-era outlaws
