= James Clark (criminal) =

Outlaw and bank robber (1902-1974)

James "Oklahoma Jack" Clark (1902–1974) was a Depression-era outlaw and bank robber.

== Biography ==
A protégé of bank robber Herman "Baron" Lamm, Clark was a later member of Lamm's team who participated in the gang's final robbery against the Citizens State Bank in Clinton, Indiana on December 16, 1930. Although initially escaping with $15,567 in cash, Clark was tracked down with the others and trapped by a posse at Sidell, Illinois, resulting in the death of Lamm and two other members in the following gun battle.

Along with fellow survivor Walter Dietrich, Clark was arrested by authorities and extradited to Indiana for bank robbery charges and sentenced to the state prison at Michigan City, Indiana. During his time in prison, he and Dietrich became acquaintances with future outlaws John Dillinger, Harry Pierpont, Charles Makley, and Homer Van Meter.

One of ten prisoners who escaped from the prison (using pistols smuggled into the prison by a recently paroled Dillinger), Clark was recaptured at Hammond, Indiana after two days and returned to prison where he remained for the rest of his life.

== See also ==
- List of Depression-era outlaws
- List of fugitives from justice who disappeared

== Books ==
- Newton, Michael. Encyclopedia of Robbers, Heists, and Capers. New York: Facts On File Inc., 2002. ISBN 0-8160-4488-0
