= Russell Clark (criminal) =

American thief, bank robber and prison escapee

Russell Lee Clark
- Born: August 9, 1898; Vigo County, Indiana, U.S.
- Died: December 24, 1968 (aged 70); Detroit, Michigan, U.S.
- Other name: Boobie
- Occupations: Bank robber and thief
- Spouse: Opal "Mack Truck" Long
- Status: Paroled for health reasons in 1968
- Conviction: First degree murder (1934)
- Penalty: Life imprisonment

Russell Lee "Boobie" Clark (August 9, 1898 – December 24, 1968) was an American thief, bank robber and prison escapee. He is best known as the "good natured" member of the John Dillinger gang and participated in armed holdups with them in a three-month crime spree across the Midwestern United States from October 1933 until his capture in January 1934.

== Biography ==
=== Early life and career ===
A native of Oaktown, Knox County, Indiana, Russell Clark embarked on a criminal career shortly after his dishonorable discharge from the United States Marines in 1919. He was a partner of Ralston "Blackie" Linton during the early 1920s and together robbed a series of "illicit roadhouses". In 1926, Clark was a suspect in the kidnapping of two West Terre Haute bootleggers and the murder of Joe Popolardo in Danville, Illinois. That same year, both Jack Morrison and Clark confessed to robbing the Bellevue Club in Evansville, Indiana on August 26 but the owner, Charles "Cotton" Jones, refused to press charges and the case was dropped. The following year, Clark went on a crime spree with Frank Badgley and Charles Hovious in northeast Indiana and robbed several banks. Clark was finally caught after his first robbery, from either Huntertown or Fort Wayne, Indiana, and sentenced to twenty years imprisonment on December 11 or 12, 1927.

He spent his term at the state penitentiary in Michigan City and, while there, learned from veteran stick up artists. Clark's bitterness and rebellious attitude led to disciplinary problems with prison authorities. He made three unsuccessful escape attempts and was one of the ringleaders of an inmate strike in 1929. Clark was a popular jokester among inmates and was part of a "clique" which included Harry Pierpont, Charles Makley, John "Red" Hamilton, Homer Van Meter and John Dillinger.

When Dillinger was paroled in May 1933, he launched a series of bank raids to finance the escape of his friends and was able to smuggle guns into the prison only four months after his release. On September 26, 1933, Clark and nine other convicts used the guns to help in a mass escape from the penitentiary. Along with Pierpont, Makley and Hamilton, the other escapees included James "Oklahoma Jack" Clark, Walter Dietrich, Ed Shouse, Joseph Fox, James Jenkins and Joseph Burns.

Dillinger had been arrested in Dayton, Ohio four days prior to the prison break and Clark and the others quickly began planning to free him from custody. Stealing $14,000 from a bank in St. Mary's on October 3, 1933, they broke Dillinger out of prison in Lima, Ohio nine days later. Sheriff Jess Sarber was killed by Pierpont during the escape. Clark and the rest of the gang began raiding police stations in Auburn and Peru, Indiana stocking up on weapons, ammunition and bulletproof vests in preparation for a violent three-month crime spree across the Midwest.

=== Time with the John Dillinger gang ===
Clark was absent from the gang's first robbery in Greencastle, Indiana on October 23, missing out on his share of the $18,428 in cash and $56,300 in negotiable bonds, but was with them the following month when the gang robbed $27,789 from a bank in Racine, Wisconsin. The gang were forced to use four hostages as human shields in order to make their getaway. On December 13, 1933, Clark also took part in the robbery of a Chicago bank by chiseling through the walls and into the vault where they emptied 96 safety deposit boxes. The official report lists the theft of only $8,700 in cash however authorities estimated the gang may have gotten away with unreported cash and jewelry valued as high as $50,000.

Following the Chicago bank heist, the state of Illinois published a list of public enemies. Of the 21 names listed, Clark was ranked fifth behind Dillinger, Pierpont, Hamilton and Makley respectively. The gang decided to hide out in Florida during the Christmas holidays and, by New Year's Day, regrouped in Tucson, Arizona to plan their next move. Clark and his girlfriend Opal Long were the first to arrive on January 10 and the rest following behind over the next week and a half. On January 22, 1934, less than a day after their reunion, a fire broke out in their hotel. A local firefighter, apparently an avid fan of detective pulp magazines, recognized both Clark and Makley. The authorities were informed and the hotel was raided three days later. Clark was the first to be arrested and was reportedly pistol-whipped into unconsciousness when resisting arrest and going for a weapon. Dillinger, Pierpont and Makley were also arrested in the raid. Dillinger was extradited to Indiana to stand trial for the murder of an East Chicago police officer while Clark and the others were returned to Michigan City. Transferred to Lima, they were tried for the murder of Sheriff Sarber.

=== Trial, conviction and imprisonment ===
The trial began on February 14, 1934, and both Pierpont and Makley were sentenced to death the following month. Clark expected the same sentence and expressed disinterest in his own trial. He was often seen yawning loudly and sleeping in court. His lawyer Louis Piquett, a known underworld lawyer in Chicago, was able to persuade the jury to recommend mercy in Clark's case, especially as the triggerman was already sentenced to death. Clark was sentenced to life in prison on March 24.

The three men still held out hope that they would be liberated once more by Dillinger. When Dillinger was gunned down by federal agents in Chicago four months later, they decided to break out themselves. On September 22, 1934, a little more than a year after their last escape, Pierpont and Makley surprised their guards using pistols made from soap cakes (blackened with shoe polish) and escaped from their cells. They then moved on to free Clark and six other inmates but were stopped when they reached a set of newly installed steel doors. The convicts were then met by guards who fired at them, killing Makley and leaving Pierpont seriously wounded, while Clark and the other prisoners retreated back to their cells.

Clark remained imprisoned in Columbus, Ohio for the next 34 years until being paroled for health reasons on August 14, 1968. He died of cancer in Detroit, Michigan on Christmas Eve only four months after his release. He was the last surviving member of the original Dillinger gang.

== In popular culture ==
Clark has been featured in two crime novels, The Hunt (1991) by William Diehl and Handsome Harry: A Novel (2005) by James Carlos Blake.
