= Herman Lamm =

German-American bank robber (1890–1930)

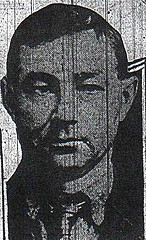
- Born: April 19, 1890; Kassel, German Empire
- Died: December 16, 1930 (aged 40); Sidell, Illinois, United States
- Cause of death: Suicide
- Other names: "Baron" Lamm; Harry K. Lamb; Robert J. Masden; Thomas Bell
- Occupation: Former member of the Prussian Army
- Conviction: Grand larceny
- Criminal charges: Charge of robbery, 1914; suspicion of hold up, 1918; arrested for burglary, 1920; arrested 1927; arrested 1929
- Penalty: Imprisonment in 1917

Herman Karl Lamm (April 19, 1890 – December 16, 1930), known as Baron Lamm, was a German-American bank robber. A former Prussian Army soldier who emigrated to the United States, Lamm believed a heist required all the planning of a military operation. He pioneered the concepts of "casing" a bank and developing escape routes before conducting the robbery. Using a meticulous planning system called "The Lamm Technique", he conducted dozens of successful bank robberies from the end of World War I.

In 1930, Lamm committed suicide when surrounded by a law-enforcement party in Sidell, Illinois, after a botched heist. Lamm's techniques were studied and imitated by other bank robbers across the country, including the infamous John Dillinger.

== Criminal career ==
Lamm was a member of the Prussian Army, but was cashiered by his regiment after he was caught cheating at cards. After he was discredited, Lamm emigrated to the United States shortly before the outbreak of World War I in 1914. Lamm became a holdup man, and quickly started adapting his military training, his study of tactics, and his precision and discipline into the commission of crimes. He theorized that a heist required all the planning of a military operation, which included the development of contingency options in the event of unforeseen problems. Bank robberies in the United States were largely improvised at the time, resulting in varied degrees of success and failure among heists. Lamm sought to take the guesswork out of bank robbing. Lamm was arrested in 1917 after a botched holdup and served a brief stint in a Utah prison, where he developed what became known as "The Lamm Technique", in which he pioneered the concept of "casing" banks.

The system involved carefully studying a target bank for many hours before the robbery, developing a detailed floor plan, noting the location of safes, taking meticulous notes and establishing escape routes. He would occasionally have a man pose as a journalist to better understand the inner workings of the bank. Lamm assigned each gang member a specific job, along with a specific zone of the bank they were charged with surveying and a strict timetable to complete their stage of the robbery. Among the jobs he assigned to his fellow robbers were the lookout, the getaway driver, the lobby man, and the vault man. He also put his men through a series of rehearsals, some of which involved using a full-scale mock-up of the interior of the bank. Lamm stressed the importance of timing during these practice runs, and used stopwatches to ensure the proper results were achieved. He only allowed his gang members to stay in a bank for a specific period of time, regardless of how much money they could steal.

Lamm is also credited with having devised the first detailed bank robbery getaway maps, which he called "gits". Once Lamm targeted a bank, he mapped the nearby back roads, which he called "cat roads", to a tenth of a mile. He meticulously developed getaway plans for each of his robberies. Before every heist, Lamm obtained a nondescript car with a high-powered engine, and often recruited drivers who had been involved in auto racing. Lamm pasted a chart on the dashboard for the driver, which included block-by-block markings of escape routes, alternative turns and speedometer readings. Before each run, Lamm and the getaway driver clocked each route to the second under various weather conditions. Practice runs on the escape routes and alternative routes would take days to master. Using this system, Lamm and his gang conducted dozens of successful bank robberies from the end of World War I to 1930, taking more than $1 million in total. They were considered the most efficient gang of bank robbers of the era.

Lamm had several run-ins with the authorities, using several aliases. After he and an accomplice were arrested in February 1927, Lamm's past came up when police discovered previous criminal suspicion. In a bond hearing to determine Lamm's fate (he was using the alias "Robert J. Masden" at the time), evidence showed that he had been arrested in San Francisco in December 1914 (under his actual name), on a charge of robbery, but there was no known disposition of the case. Also under his real name, he was arrested in Superior, Wisconsin, in June 1918 under suspicion of being connected with a hold-up. He was told to leave the city after no connection could be established. He was arrested under the alias "Harry K. Lamb" in Kansas City, Missouri, in July 1918, but was released. Under the name "Thomas Bell", he was arrested in St. Joseph, Missouri, in December 1920, on a charge of burglary. This was the alias he was originally identified as upon his death in 1930. In May 1929, Lamm was arrested in Benton, Illinois, and it was discovered he was a suspect in robbery of the Northwestern National Bank of Milwaukee, Wisconsin.

== Death ==
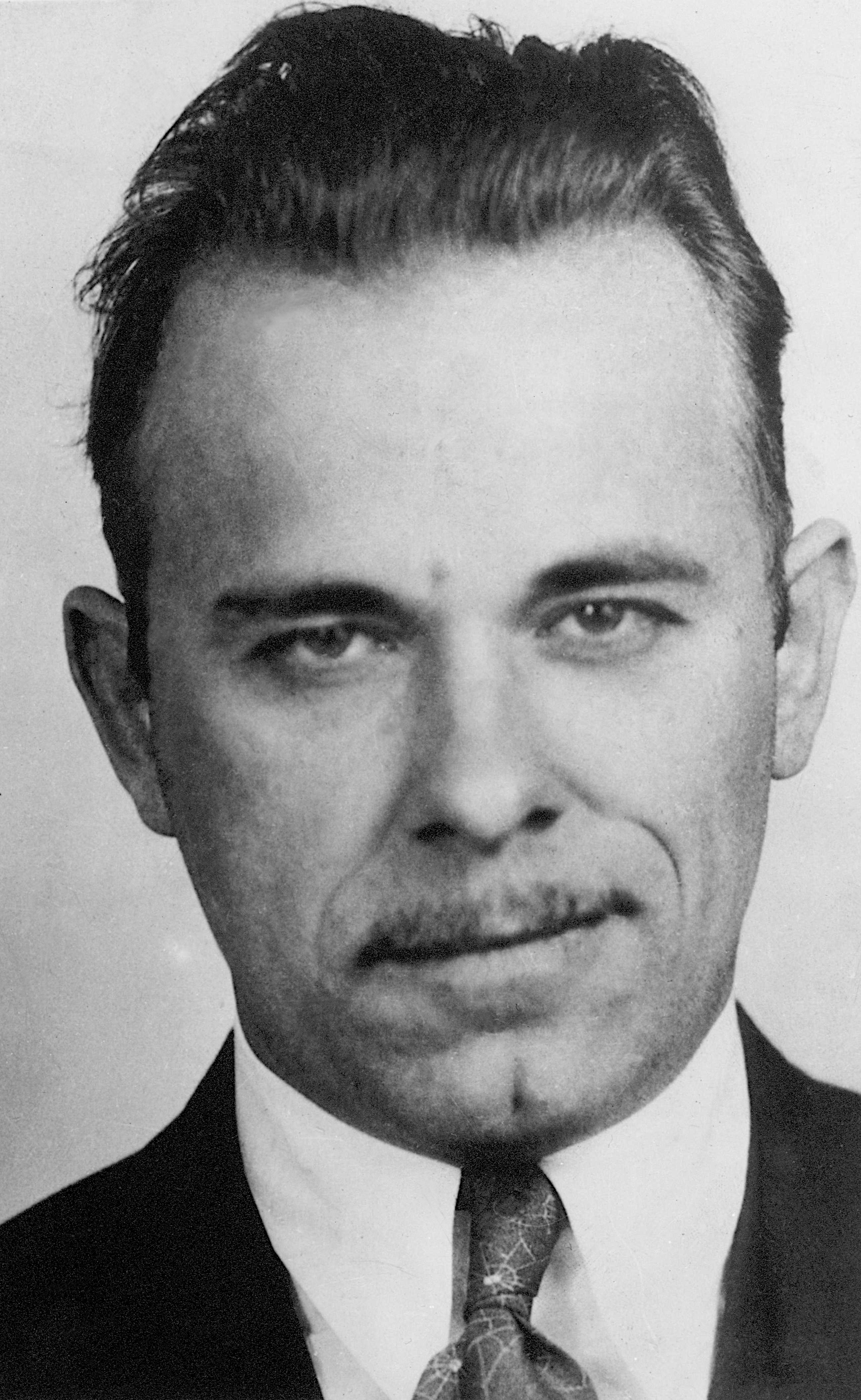
John Dillinger (pictured) studied and used the bank robbery techniques developed by Lamm.

Lamm died on December 16, 1930, after a botched bank robbery in Clinton, Indiana. After stealing $15,567 from the Citizens State Bank, getaway driver and ex-rum-runner W. H. Hunter noticed a local barber approaching the car with a shotgun. The driver panicked and pulled a fast U-turn, causing the Buick sedan to blow a tire after jumping a curb. Lamm and his men seized a second car, but were forced to abandon it after they realized it could go no more than 35 miles per hour (56 km/h) because it was fitted with a governor, which the car's owner had installed to prevent his elderly father from driving recklessly.

The gang seized a third vehicle, a truck, but because it had very little water in the radiator, they were forced to seize a fourth vehicle (another car), which had only one gallon of gas in the tank. Lamm and his gang were cornered near Sidell, Illinois, by about 200 police officers and armed citizens. A massive gun battle ensued, in which Hunter was wounded and later died. Lamm and another gang member, 71-year-old G. W. "Dad" Landy, shot themselves in the head rather than surrender. Two survivors of Lamm's gang, Walter Dietrich and James "Oklahoma Jack" Clark, were captured and eventually sentenced to life in an Indiana state prison.

== Legacy ==
Lamm is widely considered one of the most brilliant and efficient bank robbers to have ever lived, and has been described as "the father of modern bank robbery". By his death in 1930, the Lamm Technique had already been widely imitated by other bank robbers across the country. Infamous bank robber John Dillinger studied Lamm's meticulous bank-robbing system and used it extensively throughout his criminal career. Dietrich and Clark met Dillinger during their stint in the Indiana state prison following Lamm's death. The pair were permitted to join Dillinger's gang on the condition they taught him everything they knew about the Lamm Technique.
