= Charles Makley =

American murderer (1889–1934)

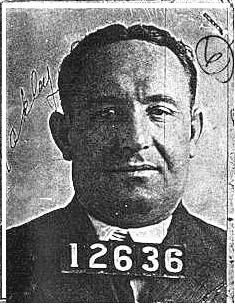
- Born: Charles Omer Makley; November 24, 1889; Saint Marys, Ohio, U.S.
- Died: September 22, 1934 (aged 44); Ohio State Penitentiary, Columbus, Ohio, U.S.
- Cause of death: Gunshot wounds
- Resting place: Sugar Ridge Cemetery; Leipsic, Ohio, U.S.
- Other names: Fat Charles, Charles McGray
- Occupation: Bank Robber
- Known for: Member of The Dillinger Gang
- Criminal charges: Bank Robbery, Murder
- Criminal penalty: Death sentence
- Criminal status: Deceased

Charles Omer Makley (November 24, 1889 – September 22, 1934), also known as Charles McGray and Fat Charles, was an American criminal and bank robber active in the early 20th century, most notably as a criminal associate of John Dillinger. Makley was identified by the Federal Bureau of Investigation as one of the core members of the Dillinger gang and participated in numerous bank robberies across the Midwest during the early 1930s.

== Early life and education ==
Makley was born in St. Marys, Ohio, to Edward Makley and Martha Sunderland Makley. Charles was the oldest of five children, with two brothers, George and Fred, and two sisters, Florence and Mildred. Makley dropped out of school in the eighth grade and turned to crime in his teens, first with petty theft, then bootlegging and bank robbery in at least three Midwestern states.

On July 30, 1924, he was arrested in Wichita, Kansas, for bank robbery, under the alias of Charles McGray. He was sentenced to 15 years but was paroled after serving only a portion of his sentence.

== Early criminal career ==
Following his parole, Makley continued his criminal activities. On March 24, 1927, he participated in the robbery of the Bank of Linn Grove in Adams County, Indiana, stealing $3,713. During this robbery, Makley and his partner forced cashier Muri Lybarger and Mrs. Lybarger to lie down before making their escape.

Makley was captured in early June 1928 in Hammond, Indiana, along with two other men and two women. On June 23, 1928, at age 39, he pleaded guilty to robbery charges and was sentenced by Judge Jesse C. Sutton in the Adams circuit court to serve 10 to 21 years in the Indiana State Prison at Michigan City. His sister-in-law, Mrs. Edith Makley of St. Marys, who was also charged with participating in the Linn Grove robbery, was released when the affidavit against her was dismissed due to insufficient evidence.

Makley was identified as the fourth member of a bank robbery gang to be sentenced within a two-week period in 1928. His confederates included Harry Smith and Edward Axe of St. Marys, Ohio, who were sentenced to 20 years each for robbing the Chickasaw, Ohio bank, and Howard Smith, also of St. Marys, who received a 15-year sentence for robbing the Ansonia, Ohio bank. Three other associates—Eddie Meadows of Kansas City, Missouri, and Robert Wheatley and his wife Gladys of Hammond, Indiana—were also arrested in the roundup but faced separate charges.

At Indiana State Prison, Makley became acquainted with fellow inmate John Dillinger, who was serving eight and a half years for the botched robbery of a grocery store.

== Dillinger gang activities ==
While incarcerated at Indiana State Prison, Makley became part of a group of inmates planning a coordinated escape. When Dillinger was paroled in May 1933, he began executing the escape plan from the outside, robbing banks to finance the operation and smuggling weapons into the prison.

On September 26, 1933, Makley and several other inmates escaped from Indiana State Prison using smuggled weapons. The group immediately began a crime spree across the Midwest, with Makley serving as one of the gang's primary leaders.

=== Gambier bank robbery ===
On October 6, 1933, Makley led a robbery of the Peoples Bank in Gambier, Ohio, while Dillinger was incarcerated in the county jail in Lima, Ohio, awaiting trial for a bank robbery in Bluffton, Ohio. During the Gambier robbery, the bank's cashier, J.R. "Ray" Brown, engaged the robbers in a gunfight and was shot in the hand. The gang seized Brown and used him as a human shield during their escape, making off with $714. Brown was later released unharmed at the bottom of College Hill, just outside Gambier.

Makley was identified as the actual leader of this heist by both Brown and Kenyon College student J. Grant Dwyer, who was a customer in the bank during the robbery. This crime marked Knox County's first-ever armed robbery of a bank.

=== Lima jail break ===
Less than a week after the Gambier robbery, on October 12, 1933, Makley participated in the infamous Lima jail break that freed Dillinger. The FBI identified Makley as one of four men who showed up at the Lima jail claiming to be returning Dillinger to Indiana State Prison for parole violation. When the sheriff asked to see their credentials, one of the men shot and killed Sheriff Jess Sarber. The successful jailbreak reunited the core members of what the press would dub the "Dillinger gang."

== Capture and trial ==
The gang's crime spree came to an end in January 1934 when they were captured in Tucson, Arizona. On January 23, 1934, a fire broke out in the hotel where Clark and Makley were hiding under assumed names. Firemen recognized the men from their photographs, and local police arrested them, as well as Dillinger and Harry Pierpont.

Makley was returned to Ohio, where he was charged with the murder of Sheriff Jess Sarber during the Lima jail break. His trial began on March 13, 1934, in Lima, Ohio, with extensive security measures including National Guard protection due to fears of another escape attempt. On March 17, 1934, after deliberating for three and a half hours, the jury found Makley guilty of first-degree murder and he was sentenced to death in the electric chair.

== Death ==
While awaiting execution on death row at the Ohio State Penitentiary in Columbus, Ohio, Makley and Harry Pierpont attempted to escape on September 22, 1934. The escape attempt began at approximately 10:30 AM when the two men used fake revolvers carved from soap bars and blackened with shoe polish to overpower guards. According to FBI records, "in an escape attempt, Makley was killed, and Pierpont was wounded." Contemporary accounts described that Makley "cheated the hangman, dying instead in a hail of bullets while attempting yet another escape."

Makley was 44 years old at the time of his death on September 22, 1934. According to his death certificate (Vol. 7610 Cert. 54371) filed in Franklin County, Ohio, he died from gunshot wounds sustained during the escape attempt. His body was returned to Ohio for burial in Sugar Ridge Cemetery in Leipsic, Ohio. According to local historical accounts, his mother was reportedly a carnival performer, and he had family connections throughout Ohio including his sister Florence Mans who lived in Eldorado, Kansas, and a half-brother named Fred Makley.

== Legacy ==
Charles Makley's criminal career included numerous bank robberies across multiple states and his association with the Dillinger gang during the height of the Great Depression-era crime wave. Law enforcement officials considered him a key figure in the gang's operations, with the Kenyon College Alumni Magazine noting that he was "the actual leader of the Peoples Bank heist" rather than merely a follower.

The Gambier bank robbery that Makley led remains a significant event in Knox County history, marking the area's first armed bank robbery. His death during the failed escape attempt exemplified the violent end that awaited many Depression-era outlaws. The 1934 Ohio Court of Appeals case Makley v. State established legal precedents regarding the prosecution of gang-related murders and remains cited in legal literature.

== See also ==
- John Dillinger
- Harry Pierpont
- Russell Clark
- John Hamilton (gangster)
- List of Depression-era outlaws
