= List of the Great Depression-era outlaws =

This is a list of the Great Depression-era outlaws spanning the years of Prohibition and the Great Depression known as the "Public Enemy" era. Those include high-profile criminals wanted by state and federal law enforcement agencies for armed robbery, kidnapping, murder, and other violent crime. These are not to be confused with organized crime figures of the same period.

== List ==
Name	Portrait	Life	Comments
Edward J. Adams		1887–1921	Bootlegger, car thief, murderer: After being sentenced to life imprisonment, Adams escaped custody twice. He was killed in a shootout with police.
George "Dutch" Anderson		1879–1925	Anderson and his associates successfully robbed a US Mail truck in New York City of $2.4 million in cash, bonds, and jewelry.
John Ashley		1895–1924	Florida bandit known as the "King of the Everglades": His gang robbed banks and trains, hijacked rumrunners, and feuded with police in southern Florida until Ashley's death in 1924.
Harvey John Bailey		1887–1979	Considered one of the most successful bank robbers of the 1920s, Bailey stole over a million dollars. Bailey spent 31 years in prison and died at the age 91 in Joplin, Missouri.
Basil "The Owl" Banghart		1900–1982	Basil is best remembered for his involvement in the hoax kidnapping of Chicago mobster Jake "the Barber" Factor, a crime for which Roger Touhy and he were eventually proven innocent after nearly 20 years in prison.
Lloyd Barkdoll	No image available	1900–1982	Oregon bank robber: Sentenced to life imprisonment, Barkdoll took part in an unsuccessful escape attempt with Sam Shockley, Joseph Cretzer, and Arnold Kyle from Alcatraz in 1941.
Ma Barker		1873–1935	Legendary associate of the Barker–Karpis gang
Arthur Barker		1901–1939	Member of the Barker–Karpis gang, son of Ma Barker
Fred Barker		1899–1935	Member of the Barker–Karpis gang, son of Ma Barker
Blanche Barrow and Buck Barrow		1911–1988 (Blanche); 1903–1933 (Buck)	Members of the Barrow gang
Clyde Barrow and Bonnie Parker		1909–1934 (Clyde); 1910–1934 (Bonnie)	
Albert Bates		1891–1948	Bates was the longtime partner of George "Machine Gun" Kelly and participated in the kidnapping of oil tycoon Charles Urschel in 1933.
Edward Wilheim Bentz		1894–1979	Bentz was an American bank robber and Depression-era outlaw associated with several high-profile public enemies during his criminal career. He was eventually captured by the FBI and sentenced to Alcatraz.
Joe Bergl	No image available	1901–1950	A mechanic for Al Capone, he supplied Capone with custom-made vehicles. The vehicles were designed for protection and evasion purposes, and included armor plating, smokescreens, and oil slicks.
George Birdwell	No image available	1894–1932	George Birdwell was an American bank robber and Depression-era outlaw. He was one of the closest known associates of Pretty Boy Floyd.
Charles Birger		1881–1928	A bootlegger based in the southern region of Illinois: Birger's gang, along with the Shelton Brothers gang, waged war with each other, and the local Ku Klux Klan throughout the 1920s.
Fred William Bowerman		1893–1953	Fred William Bowerman was an American criminal, bank robber, and Depression-era outlaw, who was eventually placed on the FBI's "Ten Most Wanted" list in 1953. He was a party to the disastrous Southwest Bank holdup in St. Louis, Missouri, which was later made into a movie The Great St. Louis Bank Robbery.
Ford Bradshaw	No image available	1908–1934	Though Bradshaw never attained the fame of fellow Sooner, Oklahoma, Charles "Pretty Boy" Floyd, his small-town bank raids far exceeded those of Floyd during his criminal career. He was killed resisting arrest.
Tom "Skeet" Bradshaw	No image available	1911-	Brother of Ford Bradshaw and member of the Cookson Hills gang: Suspected in several bank robberies in Oklahoma and Kansas, he was eventually convicted of attempted murder and bootlegging in 1934.
Robert "Big Bob" Brady	No image available	1904–1934	A known associate of the Bailey–Underhill gang
Al Brady	No image available	1911–1937	Brady was an Indiana-born armed robber and murderer, who became one of the FBI's "Public Enemies" in the 1930s.
Harold Brest	No image available	1912–1979	A Pennsylvania bank robber, he was sent to Alcatraz, and was a participant in Floyd Hamilton's 1943 escape attempt.
Lester Brockelhurst		1914–1938	In 1937, "25 year-old" Bible student Lester Brockelhurst and 18-year-old Bernice Felton were arrested after three murders and multiple robberies in 18 states. Brockelhurst was sentenced to death; Felton was acquitted.
Harry Brunette	No image available	1911–1972	He was declared a national "public enemy" by the Federal Bureau of Investigation when partner Merle Vandenbush and he robbed a series of banks in the New York City area and kidnapped New Jersey state trooper William A. Turnbull during 1936.
Fred "Killer" Burke	No image available	1885–1940	Burke was an armed robber, contract killer, and primary suspect in the St. Valentine's Day Massacre. Burke was named America's most wanted man. Eventually imprisoned, he died there of heart disease.
John Callahan	No image available	1866–1936	Callahan was an American outlaw and bank robber during the closing days of the Old West. He eventually became the leading underworld figure in Wichita, Kansas, during Prohibition, specifically becoming involved in bootlegging and narcotics.
Robert Carey	No image available	1894–1932	An armed robber and contract killer, he was considered as a suspect in the St. Valentine's Day Massacre.
Tommy Carroll		1901–1934	A boxer-turned-criminal, Carroll committed numerous robberies during the 1920s and 1930s, and was a longtime member of the John Dillinger gang.
Gerald Chapman	No image available	1888–1926	Chapman was known as the "Count of Gramercy Park", and was convicted of several robberies and murders. Eventually considered one of America's top-10 criminals, Chapman was convicted of the murder of police officer James Skelly. He was sentenced to hang and was executed on April 6, 1926.
John Paul Chase		1901–1973	He was a longtime criminal associate of the Barker–Karpis gang and Baby Face Nelson, who later brought him into the John Dillinger gang. Chase was eventually caught and sent to Alcatraz, where he became one of the longest-serving inmates.
Vivian Chase		1902–1935	Chase was an associate of several robbers, including her husband, George Chase, and Charlie Mayes. However, she is best known for her role in the kidnapping of banker August Luer. Because Luer was not in good health, Chase and her partner O'Malley released him not long after his capture. O'Malley was eventually arrested, while Chase escaped. She was later found dead in her car outside St. Luke's Hospital in Kansas City, Missouri.
James "Oklahoma Jack" Clark	No image available	1902–1974	Clark was a bank robber who stole more than $15,000 from a bank in Clinton, Indiana. Held in an Indiana state prison, he met John Dillinger, Harry Pierpont, and others. He escaped using pistols smuggled in by a visitor, but was recaptured shortly thereafter. He died in prison.
Jim Clark	No image available	1902–1974	Clark was associated with Wilbur Underhill, Harvey Bailey, and Robert "Big Bob" Brady, and remained a public enemy in Kansas until his capture and imprisonment in 1934.
Russell "Boobie" Clark	No image available	1898–1968	He is best known as the "good natured" member of the John Dillinger gang, and participated in armed holdups with them in a three-month crime spree across the Midwestern United States until his capture in January 1934.
Joseph Cretzer and Arnold Kyle	No image available	1911–1946 (Cretzer); 1910–1980 (Kyle)	Largely active in the West Coast, they were one of the few groups to gain national attention outside the Midwest, and also one of the last groups to be captured by the FBI at the end of the decade. Cretzer was killed in a failed attempt to escape Alcatraz, resulting in the 1946 prison riot.
Francis "Two Gun" Crowley		1912–1932	Crowley was an American murderer and career criminal. His crime spree lasted nearly three months, ending in a two-hour shootout with the New York City Police Department in May 1931 viewed by 15,000 bystanders. He was captured and sent to Sing Sing, where he was executed in the electric chair.
James "Killer" Cunniffe	No image available	1896–1926	Cunniffe was an American bank robber who planned and successfully carried out the 1926 New Jersey mail robbery, one of the most well-publicized thefts during the 1920s.
Ed Davis	No image available	1900–1937	Davis was an American burglar, bank robber, and Depression-era outlaw. He was especially active in Oklahoma, referred to by authorities as "the Fox", and frequently teamed with Jim Clark and Frank Sawyer during the early 1930s.
Volney "Curley" Davis	No image available	1902–1978	Davis was a longtime Oklahoma bandit, and was the boyfriend of Edna Murray and an associate of both John Dillinger and the Barker–Karpis gang during the 1930s.
DeAutremont brothers	No image available	1905–1959 (Hugh); 1900–1983 (Roy); 1900–1984 (Ray)	Their unsuccessful robbery of Southern Pacific Railroad express train and the murder of all three crew members, known as the Siskiyou massacre, was subject to one of the largest and most extensive investigations in the region. The brothers were eventually identified with the assistance of Dr. Edward Heinrich, and were captured after a nationwide manhunt that lasted four years.
Lawrence De Vol	No image available	1895–1936	De Vol was an American criminal, bank robber, prison escapee, and Depression-era outlaw. He was connected to several Midwestern gangs during the 1920s and 1930s, most often with the Barker–Karpis gang and Holden–Keating gang, and was also a former partner of Harvey Bailey's early in his criminal career.
Benny and Stella Dickson	No image available	1911–1939 (Benny); 1922–1995 (Stella)	The Dicksons, husband and wife, turned to crime shortly after their marriage. Shortly after Stella's 16th birthday, they robbed a bank in Elkton, South Dakota, taking more than $2000. Stella earned the nickname "Sure Shot" by shooting out the tires of a police patrol car after a heist in Michigan. Benny was killed by FBI agents in St. Louis. Stella was captured, convicted, and sentenced to 10 years in prison.
John Herbert Dillinger		1903–1934	One of the most famous outlaws of the 20th century, he was known to have offered cab fare to his hostages, many of whom liked him in spite of themselves.
Frederick Grant Dunn		1905–"1958"	Dunn was an American criminal, burglar, and bank robber whose career spanned from 1919 until his mysterious death in 1959. He led a small gang during the 1940s and 1950s, and was referred to by the press as "the modern John Dillinger", and whose activities eventually resulted in his being listed on the FBI's Ten Most Wanted in 1958.
Martin James Durkin	No image available	1900–1981	Durkin was convicted of shooting the first FBI special agent killed in the line of duty, Edwin C. Shanahan.
Aussie Elliott	No image available	1914–1934	An associate of George Birdwell and Pretty Boy Floyd, Elliott was convicted of bank robbery in 1932 and was sent to the Oklahoma State Penitentiary, where he escaped that same year. In 1934, Elliott died in a gun battle with police near Sapulpa, Oklahoma.
Elmer Farmer	No image available	1893–1966	A member of the Barker–Karpis gang, he was later sent to Alcatraz.
Herbert Allen "Deafy" Farmer		1890–1948	Farmer was an American criminal, who with his wife Esther, operated a safe house for underworld fugitives from the mid-1920s to 1933. On June 16, 1933, Herbert and Esther Farmer were involved in the plan that set into motion the Kansas City massacre, "a pivotal event in Depression-era crimes". With five others, they were convicted of conspiracy to free a federal prisoner, Frank "Jelly" Nash, in January 1935.
Charles Fitzgerald	No image available	1877–1945	A member of Barker–Karpis Gang and later sent to Alcatraz, Fitzgerald was one of its oldest inmates.
Jake Fleagle	No image available	1890–1930	Fleagle was a member of the Fleagle gang, who achieved notoriety by being the first case that was solved in which a single fingerprint was part of the evidence that led to a conviction.
Charles Arthur "Pretty Boy" Floyd		1904–1934	Floyd was an American bank robber and killer, romanticized by the press and by folk singer Woody Guthrie in his song "Pretty Boy Floyd". Time listed his first robbery as $3.50 in pennies from a local post office at the age of 18. He was arrested and convicted of payroll robbery three years later.
Ralph Fults	No image available	1911–1993	Fults was a Depression-era outlaw and escape artist associated with Raymond Hamilton, Bonnie Parker, and Clyde Barrow of the Barrow gang.
Richard Galatas	No image available	1890–1974	A known associate of Frank Nash, he was involved in the scheme to free Nash from the FBI's custody in what became known as the Kansas City massacre; he was later sent to Alcatraz.
Roy Gardner	No image available	1884–1940	Gardner was once America's most infamous prison escapee and the most celebrated outlaw and escaped convict during the Roaring '20s.
Russell "Slim Gray" Gibson	No image available	1903–1935	Gibson was an American bank robber and Depression-era outlaw associated with Alvin Karpis and the Barker gang during the late 1920s and '30s.
Helen Wawzynak Gillis	No image available	1908–1987	Gillis was the wife of mobster Baby Face Nelson, and assisted with many of his crimes. Alongside her husband, she was labeled public enemy number one. She was caught by the police soon after evading them while fleeing the scene of her husband's death.
Fred "Shotgun" George Ziegler Goetz	No image available	1896–1934	Goetz, who was also known as "Shotgun" George Ziegler, George B. Seibert, and George Zeigler, was a Chicago outfit mobster and a suspected participant in the Valentine's Day massacre, in 1929, and Kansas City massacre.
Eddie Green		1898–1934	Green was best known as a member of the John Dillinger gang. He was also associated with Frank "Jelly" Nash, Volney Davis, and the Barker–Karpis gang in his early career.
Floyd Garland Hamilton	No image available	1908–1984	Brother of Raymond Hamilton, he was the driver for the Barrow gang during the early 1930s. He was the mastermind in the attempted escape from Alcatraz in 1943.
John "Red" Hamilton		1899–1934?	Hamilton was a Canadian criminal and bank robber active in the early 20th century, most notably as a criminal associate of John Dillinger's.
Raymond Hamilton	No image available	1913–1935	Brother of Floyd Hamilton, he was a member of the notorious Barrow gang during the early 1930s. By the time he was 21 years old, he had accumulated a prison sentence of 362 years. He was executed by electric chair in 1935.
Thomas J. Holden and Francis L. Keating	No image available	1896–1953 (Holden); 1899–1978 (Keating)	Led by Thomas James Holden (1896–1953) and Francis Keating (1899–July 25, 1978), the gang was active in the Midwestern United States during the 1920s and 1930s. Holden was described by a spokesman for the FBI as "a menace to every man, woman, and child in America", and was the first fugitive to be officially listed on the FBI's Ten Most Wanted List in 1950.
Alva-Dewey Hunt and Hugh Gant	No image available	1897–1978 (Hunt); 1899–1984 (Gant)	A Depression-era outlaw group led by Alva-Dewey Hunt and Hugh Gant, the gang was active during the mid-to late 1930s. Although largely unknown on a national scale, their Midwest counterparts receiving the focus of the media, they were the only gang to operate south of the Mason–Dixon line, and robbed countless banks throughout the Southeastern United States
Elmer H. Inman	No image available	1880–1939	He was an American criminal, bank robber, jewel thief, and Depression-era outlaw. At one time considered Oklahoma's "Public Enemy No. 1", he was a member of the Kimes–Terrill Gang and associated with Herman Barker and Wilbur Underhill, Jr., throughout the early 1930s.
Eleanor "The Blonde Tigress" Jarman	No image available	1904–????	Jarman was involved in a robbery with George Dale and Leo Minneci, in which Dale shot the shop owner. They were all captured, and Jarman and Minneci were sentenced to jail, but Jarman escaped custody and her whereabouts remained unknown.
Charles E. Johnson		1907-1954	Johnson was a New York burglar who was listed on the FBI's Ten Most Wanted during 1953 for his robbery of a bank robber, who implicated him when he was captured.
William Daniel Jones		1915–1974	Jones ran with Bonnie and Clyde from Christmas Eve 1932 to early September 1933. He was one of two gang members who were consolidated into the "C. W. Moss" character in the 1967 film Bonnie and Clyde.
Alvin "Creepy" Karpis		1908–1979	Nicknamed "Creepy" for his sinister smile and called "Ray" by his gang members, he was an American criminal known for his alliance with the Barker gang in the 1930s. He was the last "public enemy" to be taken, and served the longest sentence of any prisoner at Alcatraz (26 years).
George "Machine Gun" Kelly		1895–1954	Kelly was an American gangster during the Prohibition era. His nickname came from his favorite weapon, a Thompson submachine gun. His most famous crime was the kidnapping of oil tycoon and businessman Charles Urschel in July 1933, for which he and his gang earned $200,000 ransom.
John Allen Kendrick		1897–1960	He was an American criminal, escape artist, bank robber, and member of the Tri-State gang, whose career spanned four decades. He was listed on the FBI's Top Ten Most Wanted in late 1955, and was apprehended by the FBI that same year.
Matthew Kimes and Ray Terrill	No image available	1906–1945 (Kimes); 1900–? (Terrill)	A bank robbing gang, led by Matthew Kimes and Ray Terrill, it was active in the Midwestern United States during the 1920s. The gang was known not only for their high-profile robberies, but also for their frequent escapes from prison. The members were alleged to have sworn a blood oath to free each other from jail, should they ever be captured, or die in the attempt.
Jean LaBanta	No image available	1879–????	LaBanta was an American criminal, forger, and train robber. Partly due to his robberies, the Southern Pacific Railroad company first began arming its guards.
Herman K. "Baron" Lamm		1890–1930	Also known as Baron Lamm, he was a German-American bank robber. He is widely considered one of the most brilliant and efficient bank robbers to have ever lived, and has been described as "the father of modern bank robbery".
Hyman S. Lehman	No image available	1903–1990	Lehman was an American gunsmith and armorer. He provided specialized and custom-made weaponry to countless bank robbers and outlaws during the Great Depression. In 1941, Lehman retired from gunsmithing and remained in San Antonio designing custom boots and saddles until his death.
Clarence Lieder	No image available	1906–1969	He was a mechanic and armorer for Chicago's underworld and Depression-era criminals, as well as the primary competitor to Joe Bergl in supplying both mobsters and other criminals with customized automobiles throughout Prohibition and during the early 1930s.
Wilhelm Loeser	No image available	1876–1935	Loeser was an American physician and pharmacist, who provided medical care to underworld figures during the public enemy era of the 1930s. His most famous clients were John Dillinger and Homer Van Meter, who hired him to perform plastic surgery on them.
Henry Loftus and Harry Donaldson	No image available	1915- (Loftus); 1910- (Donaldson)	Two young men who made national headlines for their unsuccessful attempt to rob the Southern Pacific Railroad's Apache Limited in 1937. The last major train robbery in the United States, the two have been referred to as "the last of America's classic train robbers".
James C. "Tex" Lucas		1912–1998	A Texas bank robber and car thief, he was later sent to Alcatraz, where he attempted to escape from the island in 1938.
Charles Makley		1889–1934	
Ben Golden McCollum	No image available	1909–1963	McCollum was an outlaw in Oklahoma during the 1920s, who was nicknamed the "Shiek of Boynton". McCollum robbed banks in both Prague (where he got away with $3400) and Checotah, Oklahoma ($4700), in 1929. He was captured on the streets of Boynton, Oklahoma, shortly after the Checotah heist.
Henry Methvin		1912–1948	He was an American criminal, bank robber, and Depression-era outlaw. He is best remembered as the final member of the Barrow gang] and whose father, Ivan Methvin, helped arrange their deaths at the hands of a posse headed by Texas lawman Frank Hamer in 1934.
Vernon C. Miller		1896–1933	Miller was a freelance Prohibition gunman, bootlegger, bank robber, and former sheriff in South Dakota, who as the only identified member of the Kansas City massacre, was found beaten and strangled to death shortly after the incident.
William "Billy the Killer" Miller	No image available	1906–1931	As an American bank robber and Depression-era outlaw, he committed numerous bank heists in Michigan, Ohio, Kentucky, and Oklahoma, and teamed up with George Birdwell and Pretty Boy Floyd during the early 1930s.
George Clarence "Bugs" Moran		1893–1957	"Bugs" Moran was a Chicago Prohibition-era gangster. He was incarcerated three times before his 21st birthday. Seven members of his gang were gunned down in a warehouse in the Saint Valentine's Day massacre of February 14, 1929, supposedly on the orders of his rival Al Capone.
Joseph P. Moran	No image available	1905–1934	Moran was a doctor known for catering to the Depression-era criminal underworld in the early 20th century. He was also a peripheral member of the Barker–Karpis gang, and this association Karpis later stated had led to Moran's murder by Fred and Arthur "Doc" Barker.
Frank Mulloy	No image available	1888–1963	Convicted for his alleged role in the Kansas City massacre, he spent time in Alcatraz.
Edna "Rabbits" Murray	No image available	1898–1966	She was a Depression-era outlaw and partner of Volney Davis' during the early 1930s. Although popularly known to the press as the "Kissing Bandit" for her habit of kissing male robbery victims, she was known in the underworld as "Rabbits" for her skill as an escape artist.
Frank "Jelly" Nash	No image available	1887–1933	Nash has been called "the most successful bank robber in U.S. history", but he is most noted for his violent death in what has become known as the Kansas City massacre in 1933.
George "Baby Face" Nelson		1908–1934	Lester Joseph Gillis, known under the pseudonym George Nelson, was a bank robber and murderer in the 1930s. Nelson was responsible for the murder of several people, and has the dubious distinction of having killed more FBI agents in the line of duty than any other person. He was shot by FBI agents and died after a shootout often termed the "Battle of Barrington".
Phoenix Donald	No image available	1895–1944	A member of the Barker–Karpis gang, Phoenix later died in Alcatraz.
Harry "Pete" Pierpont		1902–1934	Pierpont was a Prohibition-era gangster, and friend and mentor to John Dillinger.
Adam "Eddie" Richetti		1909–1938	Richetti was an American criminal and Depression-era bank robber. He was associated with Aussie Elliott and later Pretty Boy Floyd in the early 1930s, and both Floyd and he were later implicated in the Kansas City massacre. Richetti was executed on October 7, 1938.
Verne Sankey and Gordon Alcorn	No image available	1890–1934 (Sankey); 1905–1982 (Alcorn)	Sankey and Gordon Alcorn were Depression-era outlaws whose successful kidnappings of Haskell Bohn and Charles Boettcher II in 1932 made them two of the most wanted criminals in the United States. Sankey was initially a suspect in the Lindbergh baby kidnapping, but was cleared after an investigation by the FBI.
Harry Sawyer	No image available	1890–1955	A member of the Barker–Karpis gang, he was later sent to Alcatraz.
James Franklin Sawyer	No image available	1899–1979	Sawyer was a Depression-era bank robber and prison escapee. Although he was responsible for several bank robberies in Kansas and Oklahoma, he was wrongfully imprisoned for a 1932 bank robbery in Fort Scott, Kansas, and spent almost 40 years in prison before he was pardoned by Governor Robert Docking in 1969.
Walton Spark	No image available	1906–1983	An accomplice in John Dillinger's escape from an Indiana jail in 1934, Spark was imprisoned and sent to Alcatraz.
William Francis Sutton		1901–1980	Sutton was a prolific U.S. bank robber. During his 40-year criminal career, he stole an estimated $2 million, and eventually spent more than half of his adult life in prison. After his release, he spoke about prison reform and consulted with banks on antirobbery techniques.
Nicholas "Chaw Jimmie" Trainor	No image available	1886–1922	On the afternoon of December 18, 1922, five men hijacked a Federal Reserve Bank delivery truck outside the U.S. Mint in Denver, Colorado. Four escaped unidentified, but 36-year-old Nicholas "Chaw Jimmie" Trainor was killed during the shootout with the U.S Mint Police. The remaining men successfully escaped with $200,000.
Wilbur "Mad Dog" Underhill, Jr.	No image available	1901–1934	Often called "Mad Dog" or the "Tri-State Terror", he was an American criminal, burglar, bank robber, and Depression-era outlaw. He was one of the most wanted bandits in Oklahoma during the 1920s and 1930s and co-led a gang with Harvey Bailey that included many fellow Cookson Hills outlaws, including Jim Clark, Ed Davis, and Robert "Big Bob" Brady.
Homer "Wayne" Van Meter		1906–1934	He was an American criminal and bank robber active in the early 20th century, most notably as a criminal associate of John Dillinger and Baby Face Nelson's.
Huron "Terrible Ted" Walters	No image available	1913–1971	An Arkansas bank robber and one time associate of Floyd Hamilton, Walters was sent to Alcatraz and attempted to escape in 1943. He was killed by a Texas Ranger during a hostage situation in 1971.
Otto Wood	No image available	1894–1930	A Depression-era desperado, he was born in Wilkes County, North Carolina, in 1894.
Richard Whittemore	No image available	1898–1926	Led by Richard Reese Whittemore, the gang went on a year-long crime spree committing payroll, bank, and jewelry robberies in Maryland and New York before their capture in 1926.
