= Eddie Green (criminal) =

American bank robber and Depression-era outlaw

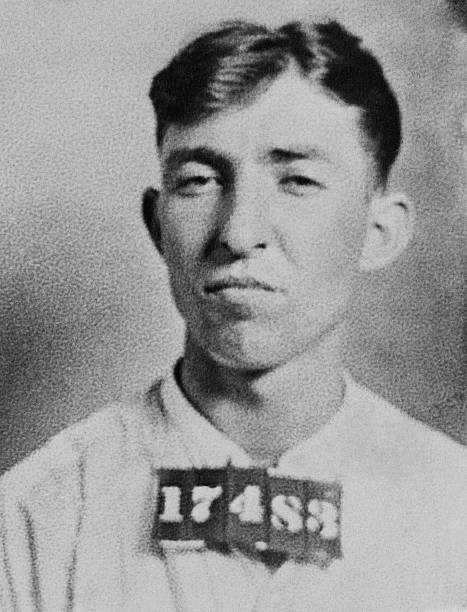
- Born: Harold Eugene Green; November 2, 1898; Pueblo, Colorado
- Died: April 10, 1934 (aged 35); St. Paul, Minnesota
- Cause of death: Gunshot wounds
- Occupation: Bank robber
- Spouse: Bessie Green
- Convictions: 1916; 1921-1933

Harold Eugene "Eddie" Green (November 2, 1898 – April 10, 1934) was an American bank robber and Depression-era outlaw during the 1930s, best known as a member of the John Dillinger gang. He was also associated with Frank "Jelly" Nash, Volney Davis and the Barker-Karpis Gang in his early career.

Green was considered a highly intelligent criminal and expert "jug marker," widely known to employ tactics such as casing banks and planning escape routes that he drove prior to a robbery to ensure a perfect getaway. His connections with corrupt politicians and police officials in St. Paul, Minnesota made him extremely useful in setting up safe houses and provide warning from police raids.

== Biography ==
=== Early life ===
Eugene Green, born in 1898, lived in Pueblo, Colorado, with his mother and brothers James and Frank, their father having died when Eddie was three.

The following is the criminal record of Edward Green, aliases Eugene Green, George Graham, Charles Ryan, George Green, Fred Rogge, and Frederick Riley:

- As Eugene Green, arrested August 11, 1916, by the Milwaukee Police Department, Milwaukee, Wisconsin; charge grand larceny. Six months house of corrections.
- As George Graham, arrested by the St. Paul Police Department, St. Paul, Minnesota, July 7, 1921. Charge investigation.
- As Fred Rogge, arrested by the Minneapolis Police Department, Minneapolis, Minnesota. Charge suspected auto thief; 90 days suspended.
- He was arrested by the St. Paul PD July 17, 1922; charged with robbery, then released.
- As Frederick Riley, arrested by the Des Moines Police Department, Des Moines, Iowa, August 8, 1922. charge investigation; suspected auto thief and safe blower; fugitive from Minneapolis. Released.
- As Eddie Green, he was received at the state reformatory, St. Cloud, Minnesota, November 15, 1922 Charged with robbery first degree, he was convicted and sentenced 40 years, serving 5 years. As Eddie Green, he was received at the Minnesota State Prison, Stillwater, Minnesota, July 26, 1923, on a transfer from the state reformatory.

=== Major career ===
After his parole, he occasionally worked in iron mills while becoming a skilled "jug marker," someone who chooses which bank to rob. Green took part in his first major bank robbery on January 28, 1933, when he joined Earl Doyle, Thomas "Buck" Woulfe and "Dago" Howard Lansdon in robbing a bank messenger in North Kansas City of $14,500. During the robbery, a shootout occurred that left Marshal Edgar Nall and Woulfe wounded. The gang later battled a pursuing posse, largely made up of local residents, and escaped by stealing one of their cars.

Green and his partners fled to Iowa where they stole spare license plates from two vehicles and kidnapped two Knoxville police officers, Burt Conrey and John Neuman, before returning to Missouri. Releasing the hostages in Unionville on January 29, they also dropped off Woulfe who was arrested at a hospital in Coffeyville, Kansas four days later. Woulfe, who had been shot in the groin, died soon after being transferred to the county jail in Liberty, Missouri.

Three months later, Green joined Jess Doyle, Earl Christman, Frank "Jelly" Nash, Volney Davis, brothers Arthur and Fred Barker and Alvin Karpis to rob a bank in Fairbury, Nebraska on April 4, 1933. Christman was badly wounded during the robbery and Green drove him to Verne Miller's house in Kansas City to recover. Christman eventually died from his wounds and was buried in an unmarked grave outside town.

Green eventually became displeased with the tactics used by the Barker brothers, and began to seek a new gang, resurfacing as an associate of Baby Face Nelson, late in 1933 and early 1934, along with Tommy Carroll, and Homer Van Meter, and later became a member of the reorganized John Dillinger gang in early 1934. His first robbery with the group, then including Dillinger, Tommy Carroll, Homer Van Meter and Baby Face Nelson, was on March 6 when they held up a bank in Sioux Falls, South Dakota for $49,500. Green also provided the gang with an extra gunman, Tommy Carroll. One motorcycle cop, Hale Keith, was hit four times in the chest when Nelson shot him through a plate glass window.

A week later in Mason City, Iowa, despite casing the bank with Van Meter beforehand at an estimated $250,000 and using a series of diagrams and planned getaway routes made by Green, the gang grabbed only $52,000, taking 25 hostages to make their getaway possible. Both Dillinger and John "Red" Hamilton were wounded in their shoulders, as well as an innocent bystander that Nelson mistook for a cop, during their escape.

=== Death ===
Returning to St. Paul, Green provided a safehouse for Dillinger and Van Meter. However, the FBI had been on Dillinger's trail for some time, as they were for many Depression-era outlaws, and were getting close to capturing him. On March 31, federal agents raided the hideout and surprised the three, who managed to escape after an ensuing shootout. Dillinger was wounded in the escape and, while Green arranged for medical treatment in Minneapolis, the FBI came up with a lead on Dillinger's benefactor. When investigators were searching Dillinger's abandoned apartment, they discovered a telephone number which they traced to one of Green's hideouts in St. Paul.

Green and his common-law wife Bessie turned up at the safehouse on April 3. Green left the car and proceeded to enter the apartment when he was ambushed by federal agents, armed with Thompson machine guns, and was shot in the head and shoulder. The FBI defended its actions, amid conflicting reports that Green had either attempted to flee or was gunned down in cold blood, claiming that Green "assumed a threatening attitude ... accompanied by menacing gestures." The FBI would receive heavy criticism from the press in regards to the death of an unarmed suspect, which slowed their investigation of Dillinger.

Green was taken to a hospital in St. Paul where he died from his wounds seven days later. He was delirious for the week before his death, allowing federal agents to record every word he said. Among the information they were able to gain included revealing the existence of the Karpis-Barker Gang, whom they were able to capture within 10 months. His wife, then held in custody for harboring her husband, told the police the names of Dillinger's gang upon her husband's death. She also confirmed that the Karpis-Barker gang was responsible for the January 1934 kidnapping of Edward Bremer, and named all of the gang members along with their girlfriends, leading to the issuing of federal indictments against them.

Also per the 1994 version of "Dillinger: The Untold Story", pg 294, the 2nd part of Footnote 33 reads---

It was from the delirious ramblings of Green that the FBI learned much about the St. Paul underworld and the Barker-Karpis gang, with which he also had worked. It was Bessie Green who confirmed the involvement of Karpis and Doc Barker in the Bremer kidnapping, which she said had been planned by Harry Sawyer, a local mobster who operated notorious criminal hangouts and served as liaison between the police and visiting gangs; and with the Hamm kidnapping, which the Justice Department had tried to hang on Chicago's Roger Tuohy.(Tuohy was acquitted, but later framed by Al Capone for a bogus kidnapping that removed him as competition.) Bessie also mentioned in passing that Karpis and the Barker brothers usually traveled with a woman they called "Mother," who had not yet attracted much FBI attention.

=== Media ===
In the TV film Dillinger (1991), Green is portrayed by actor Michael Krawic.
