= Edna Murray =

American criminal

Martha Edna Stanley
- Born: Martha Edna Stanley; 1898; Marion, Kansas, U.S.
- Died: 1966 (aged 67–68); San Francisco, California, U.S.
- Spouses: "Diamond Joe" Sullivan; Jack Murray
- Partner: Volney Davis
- Escaped: May 2, 1927
- Escape end: September 10, 1931

Edna "Rabbit" Murray (1898–1966) was an American criminal associated with several high-profile gangs in the Depression-era of the early 1930s. Although popularly known to the press as the "Kissing Bandit" for kissing a male robbery victim, she was known in the underworld as "Rabbit" for her skills in breaking out of the penitentiary.

She was married to two criminals in the 1920s, but is best known as the lover and crime partner of Volney Davis.

== Biography ==
=== Early life ===
Born Martha Edna Stanley, she was the daughter of Nicholas and Luella Stanley in Marion, Kansas. She moved with her father to Oklahoma at an early age. As a teenager, she married a man named Paden with whom, in 1915, she had a son, Preston. She and Paden soon separated. She married again to Walter Price, but that marriage also failed.

=== Criminal career ===
Murray was working as a waitress when she met robber Volney Davis, who became her lover. He was imprisoned for life in 1918. She moved to Kansas City, Missouri where she joined her younger sister Doris, who was living with criminal Emory Connell. Murray met and married Connell's partner, jewel thief "Diamond Joe" Sullivan. Sullivan was convicted of a 1923 murder of a policeman and was executed in 1924.

After Sullivan's death, she met and married another criminal, Jack Murray. On October 1, 1925, Edna Murray and Jack Murray were sentenced to 25 years for a Kansas City, Missouri holdup. It was this crime that earned Edna the nickname "the Kissing Bandit", after she supposedly kissed victim H. H. Southward. On May 2, 1927, Edna escaped from Missouri State Penitentiary and remained free until arrested in Chicago on September 10, 1931. She made a one-day escape from prison on November 4, 1931, and then a third escape on December 13, 1932, having sawed through the bars of her cell, assisted by another prisoner, Irene McCann, who escaped with her.

Edna joined up with Volney Davis again, who had also absconded from prison in 1932. The two continued their crime spree and later settled down in Aurora, Illinois. Her son Preston joined them, and participated in their crimes. The couple soon joined up with the Barker-Karpis gang. Edna's sister Doris was now living with outlaw Jess Doyle, also a member of the Barker-Karpis gang.

On April 23, 1934, outlaws John Dillinger, Homer Van Meter and John "Red" Hamilton arrived at Murray's home seeking refuge after being ambushed by federal agents and police at their hideout near Rhinelander, Wisconsin. Hamilton, having been badly wounded during the shootout, had been denied treatment by Chicago mob doctor Joseph Moran and died of his injuries several days after arriving at their Aurora home. Murray and Davis were later present during his secret funeral, in which he was buried in an unmarked grave.

On January 22, 1935, Murray was indicted along with several members of the Barker gang for a conspiracy to kidnap wealthy Minnesota banker Edward Bremer and ransom him for $200,000 (equivalent to $4,813,000 in 2025) in January 1934. Fleeing the state, she was apprehended in Pittsburg, Kansas while traveling with Jess Doyle on February 7, 1935.

Murray's brother, Harry C. Stanley, was subsequently arrested for aiding and abetting Murray in early 1935, was fined $1,000 (equivalent to $23,000 in 2025) and sentenced to six months imprisonment at the Sedgewick County Jail on March 12, 1935. The following year, her son Preston Leroy Paden was convicted of murder for killing a night watchman in Kansas. He was given a life sentence and died in 1957.

Murray was not found guilty in the kidnapping conspiracy but was returned to the women's prison in Jefferson City, Missouri to finish serving her term for highway robbery. Volney Davis led FBI agents to Hamilton's grave outside Aurora, Illinois three months later. Edna eventually backed his story up.

=== Later life ===
Murray was very cooperative with the authorities after her capture and gave evidence against a number of the Barker-Karpis gang's associates, along with corrupt police officers and lawyers. While in prison, she marketed her persona as a "gangster's moll" in a number of newspapers and journals, writing articles with titles such as "I Was a Karpis-Barker Gang Moll". She was paroled from the Women's Prison at Jefferson City, Missouri on December 20, 1940.

Murray died in San Francisco in 1966 and is buried there.

== Depiction ==
Actress Ina Marie Smith portrayed Murray in the first Dollar Baby screen adaptation of Stephen King's short story "The Death of Jack Hamilton". This is the first major depiction of her in any film or television adaptation.

== Books ==
- Tippet, Pam Paden. Run Rabbit Run: The Life, The Legend, and The Legacy of Edna "Rabbit" Murray "The Kissing Bandit". 2013.
- Newton, Michael. Encyclopedia of Robbers, Heists, and Capers. New York: Facts On File Inc., 2002. ISBN 0-8160-4488-0.
