= Cretzer–Kyle Gang =

Depression-era criminal group

Cretzer-Kyle Gang
- Founded: January 31, 1935
- Founded by: Joseph "Dutch" Cretzer and Arnold Kyle
- Founding location: Portland, Oregon
- Years active: 1935-37
- Territory: West Coast, Midwest
- Membership (est.): 6
- Criminal activities: Bank robbery

The Cretzer-Kyle Gang was a Depression-era criminal group led by Joseph "Dutch" Cretzer and Arnold Thomas Kyle during the mid-to late 1930s. Largely active in the West Coast, they were one of the few groups to gain national attention outside the Midwest and also one of the last groups to be captured by the FBI at the end of the decade. Cretzer was killed in a failed attempt to escape Alcatraz resulting in the 1946 prison riot.

== History ==
Originally formed by bank robbers Joseph "Dutch" Cretzer and Arnold Kyle, and later joined by regular members Milton Hartmann and John Oscar Hetzer, the gang's first recorded robbery was on January 31, 1935, when Cretzer, Kyle and Hartmann stole $3,396 from a bank in Portland, Oregon. On November 29, the three men struck at a branch bank inside the Ambassador Hotel in Los Angeles, California escaping with $2,765.

On January 23, 1936, they stole $6,000 from a bank in Oakland and then returned to Los Angeles the next day to steal another $1,475. The gang remained in Los Angeles County for another six months robbing a number of banks, their biggest jobs netting them $6,100 on March 3 and $1,996 on July 1. On July 27, they stole $14,581 from a local bank in Seattle, Washington .

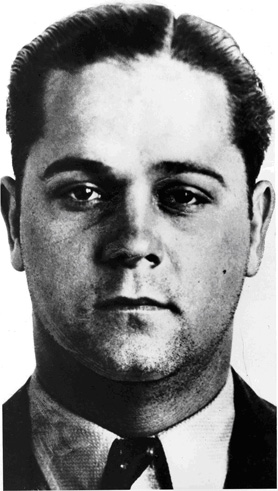
Joseph Cretzer

Soon after this robbery, the modus operandum of the gang changed as Cretzer, Kyle and Hartmann had all been identified by witnesses by this time as having participated in all the gang's robberies. Cretzer was reportedly absent when Kyle and Hartmann robbed $8,000 from another Seattle bank. Similarly, Cretzer was on his own when he walked out of a Los Angeles bank with $2,870 on January 28, 1937. On March 29, John Hetzer made his first appearance with the gang, taking part in the robbery of a Portland bank with Kyle and Hartmann, which netted $18,195. This was the gang's most successful bank job to date.

== Break-up of the Gang ==
The authorities began to actively pursue the gang, the FBI by now focusing on criminal gangs outside the Midwest. Hertzer was arrested by federal agents in a Los Angeles garage eight days after the robbery in Portland. The following day, the FBI raided the Stuart Hotel in Los Angeles. Hartmann committed suicide by shooting himself before agents entered his room.

On January 25, 1936, Edna Cretzer was taken into custody and charged with running a brothel in Pittsburg, California. She quickly posted bail while her husband Joseph remained a fugitive.

Cretzer and Kyle fled to the Midwest where, only a few years before, so many outlaws such as John Dillinger and the Karpis-Barker Gang had success. On May 18, 1939, Arnold Kyle was arrested in Minneapolis, Minnesota for drunk driving. He claimed his name was Raymond Palmer, but fingerprints confirmed his identity and he was turned over to the FBI. He pleaded guilty to federal bank robbery charges and was sentenced to 25 years imprisonment at McNeil Island, near the area where he robbed his first banks.

On August 27 1939, Cretzer was apprehended when the FBI caught up to him in Chicago, Illinois . On November 7, his wife Edna, sister of Arnold Kyle, pleaded guilty to harboring her husband. Cretzer confessed to one of the robberies in Los Angeles on January 24, 1940, and was sentenced to 25 years imprisonment. Cretzer was also incarcerated at McNeil Island and reunited with his old partner and brother-in-law. Together they hijacked a prison truck in an attempt to escape, but were both recaptured after three days hiding in the woods .

During their trial for attempted escape, Cretzer and Kyle made another escape attempt by assaulting U.S. Marshal A.J. Chitty. Both were caught before they could flee the courthouse. Chitty died from heart attack as a result of his injuries, and both were sentenced to life imprisonment . Cretzer and Kyle were transferred to Alcatraz after this incident.

Cretzer and Kyle made additional failed attempts to escape from Alcatraz in 1941 and Cretzer attempted another in 1946, where he died during the so-called Battle of Alcatraz.

Kyle served time in various prisons before being paroled in August 1963. He died in Lynnwood, Washington on November 30, 1980.
