= Harry Brunette =

American bank robber (1911–1972)

- Born: August 19, 1911; Green Bay, Wisconsin
- Died: February 19, 1972 (aged 60); Toledo, Ohio
- Occupation: Bank robber
- Conviction: Kidnapping (1936)
- Penalty: Life imprisonment

Harry Walter Brunette (August 19, 1911 – February 19, 1972) was an American bank robber and Depression era outlaw. The Federal Bureau of Investigation declared him a national "public enemy" when, in 1936, he and his partner Merle Vandenbush (June 15, 1907 – December 7, 1991) robbed a series of banks in the New York City area, and kidnapped New Jersey state trooper and former U.S. Marine William A. Turnbull on November 11, 1936. The New York City Police Department found Brunette and Vandenbush hiding out in an apartment on West 102nd Street, on December 14, 1936. Upon locating Brunette, the NYPD informed the FBI of the outlaws' whereabouts. Although this was done as a matter of professional courtesy, FBI Director J. Edgar Hoover personally led a group of federal agents to take charge of the area. At the time, the FBI was under heavy criticism from the press due to the bureau's overly-aggressive and stronghanded tactics, which had resulted in the shooting deaths of unarmed suspects and innocent bystanders. Hoover hoped to use the situation to set up a "personal arrest" by his second-in-command Clyde Tolson, for propaganda purposes, such as Hoover's own staged arrest of Alvin Karpis in 1936.

Almost from the start, there were problems between the NYPD and the FBI. They had agreed the raid would take place that afternoon at 2:00 pm, when it was believed Brunette would be asleep. However, federal agents moved ahead with the raid and stormed the apartment building at midnight. Confused police detectives, still on stakeout, watched as the raid began 14 hours ahead of schedule. When police officers at the scene questioned Hoover, according to The New York Times, the director "merely shrugged his shoulders."

Within a few minutes, when a federal agent unsuccessfully attempted to shoot the lock off his door, Brunette was alerted and immediately returned fire. Gas grenades were tossed into his room, inadvertently starting a fire, and the New York City Fire Department was called. The arrival of firefighters added to the confused scene illustrated by a reporter from Newsweek, who described an incident between a firefighter and a federal agent:

Amid the hubbub, a flustered G-man poked a submachine gun at a husky fireman. "Dammit, can't you read?" growled the fireman, pointing at his helmet. "If you don't take that gun out of my stomach I'll bash your head in.

Brunette eventually surrendered, and Tolsen was photographed leading him away in his first arrest of his career. However, in their haste to arrest Brunette, federal agents missed Vandenbush, who easily escaped amid the chaos. The following morning, NYPD Commissioner Lewis Valentine and the New Jersey Police Commissioner issued public statements criticizing the FBI's breaking of its agreement with police and putting lives at risk, while allowing Vandenbush to escape. Hoover dismissed these objections, which he referred to as "unjustified and petty criticism". When Vandenbush was captured by Sgt. John C. Hergenhan and Patrolman William G. Hendricks (who both of them become Chief of North Castle Police Department) of North Castle, New York Police Department two months later on February 25, 1937, the fugitive claimed he had been on his way to meet with Brunette but was warned off by the obvious presence of the FBI. He also said, at one point during the raid he was close enough to "tap J. Edgar Hoover on the shoulder."
