= Lieder (surname) =

Lieder is a German language habitational surname for someone from Liedern. Notable people with the name include:

- Bernard Lieder (1923–2020), American politician
- Clarence Lieder (1906–1969), mechanic and armorer for Chicago's underworld and Depression-era criminals
- Mart Lieder (1990), Dutch professional footballer
- Sheila Lieder (fl. 2022), American politician
- Rico Lieder (1971), retired German sprinter
