= Joe Bergl =

Joseph P. Bergl (1901 – September 1950) was a mechanic who supplied specially designed vehicles for Chicago's underworld, including Al Capone's Chicago Outfit, Depression-era outlaw George "Machine Gun" Kelly, and members of the Barker Gang.

Operating from his garage, Bergl Auto Sales, on 22nd Street, next to Ralph "Bottles" Capone's Cotton Club, Bergl supplied Capone's organization with custom-made cars for both protection and evasion purposes. This included armor-plated vehicles with bulletproof windows, the ability to create oil slicks and smokescreens, and other devices designed to elude police pursuit.

Members of the Barker Gang used such a car when they robbed Federal Reserve Bank messengers at Jackson Boulevard on September 22, 1933. After a patrolman was killed, the gang fled the scene with a load of canceled checks and eventually were forced to abandon their car after crashing it.

Upon finding the wrecked car, police traced the vehicle to Bergl's shop and arrested Gus Winkler, a member of the Chicago Outfit and Bergl's silent partner, naming the Chicago gangster as a member of a national armed robbery syndicate which supposedly included Depression-era bandits George "Machine Gun" Kelly and Vernon Miller.

Winkler was killed in a gangland slaying by unidentified gunmen on October 9, who reportedly suspected he would turn state's evidence in exchange for a reduction of the long prison sentence he was facing. Although Bergl was allowed to live, the exposure to law enforcement officials ended his usefulness to the crime syndicate, as criminals turned instead to competitor Clarence Lieder.

== See also ==
- List of Depression-era outlaws
