= Loeser =

Loeser is a surname. Notable people with the surname include:

- Arthur E. Loeser (1903–1942), appointed to the United States Naval Academy on 15 August 1923
- Ewald Loeser (1888–1970), German lawyer
- François Loeser (born 1958), French mathematician
- Hans F. Loeser (1920–2010), American lawyer
- Wilhelm Loeser (1876–1953), American physician and pharmacist
