= Russell Gibson =

Russell "Slim Gray" Gibson
- Born: c. 1903
- Died: January 8, 1935; Chicago, Illinois, U.S.
- Cause of death: killed by federal agents
- Occupation: Bank robber

Russell "Slim Gray" Gibson (died January 8, 1935) was an American bank robber and Depression-era outlaw associated with Alvin Karpis and the Barker Gang during the late 1920s and 1930s. Gibson spent much of his early criminal career with the Central Park Gang based in Tulsa, Oklahoma which included the Barkers, Volney Davis, Ray Terrill and other local criminal figures. He participated in his first major robbery when he teamed with Neal Merritt and James "Cowboy" Long to rob a bank messenger in Oklahoma City of $75,000. Gibson was arrested for this robbery, but escaped from county jail prior to his trial.

He later joined up with the Barker-Karpis gang and participated in numerous bank robberies with them. He, like the rest of the gang, was tracked down by the FBI during early 1935. Federal agents managed to trace him and his wife to a Chicago hideout used by the Barkers and raided the apartment building on January 8, 1935. The raid was bungled from the start as the FBI set off tear gas in the wrong apartment causing a panic among the tenants. When local police officers arrived on the scene, they nearly opened fire on federal agents who they believed were gangsters. Hoping to escape in the confusion, Gibson attempted to make it to the fire escape armed with a Browning automatic rifle and a .32 caliber pistol. FBI agents were waiting for Gibson however and opened fire. Although he was wearing a bulletproof vest, the agents' high-powered rifles killed him instantly. His wife was arrested on charges of harboring a fugitive; two other gang members, Byron Bolton and Doc Barker, were also captured.
