= The Death of Jack Hamilton =

- Short story by Stephen King
- Country: United States
- Language: English
- Genre: Crime

Publication
- Published in: The New Yorker, Everything's Eventual
- Publication type: Magazine
- Media type: Print (Paperback)
- Publication date: December 24/31, 2001 (first publication)
- Series: Stephen King

"The Death of Jack Hamilton" is a short story by American writer Stephen King. It was originally published in the December 24/31, 2001 issue of The New Yorker magazine. In 2002, it was published in King's collection Everything's Eventual. This true crime story is based on the death of Jack Hamilton, a member of John Dillinger's first gang.

== Plot summary ==
The story is written from the first-person view of Homer Van Meter, a member of John Dillinger's gang, who says he wants to tell the story of how Dillinger got the scar on his upper lip. Following a gun battle with the Federal Bureau of Investigation (FBI) at Little Bohemia Lodge, Van Meter, Dillinger and Jack Hamilton escape in a vehicle, though exchange gunfire with police from their vehicle some time later. The three men escape again, though Hamilton is shot. After ditching their damaged vehicle and stealing another from a passing motorist, the men take refuge in a rented room behind a bar, where they stay for the next five days. Hamilton's condition deteriorates, with it becoming apparent the bullet is lodged in his lung and the wound is turning gangrenous. Hamilton goes through periods of delirium. In a period of lucidity, he asks Dillinger and Van Meter to entertain him, by walking on his hands and doing "the trick with the flies" respectively, though Dillinger says he will do it later and Van Meter points out there are no flies around.

Dillinger attempts to get Dr. Joseph Moran to treat Hamilton, though returns insisting to Van Meter that Moran "was a crybaby" and he doesn't want such a man to treat Hamilton. He tells Van Meter he threatened Moran into giving him the contact details of someone else, and Moran contacted Volney Davis, a member of Ma Barker's gang. Dillinger and Van Meter take Hamilton to stay with Davis, his girlfriend "Rabbits" and Ma's son Doc, in Aurora, Illinois. Rabbits performs surgery on Hamilton and removes the bullet, though as expected the surgery is too late and his condition worsens. News that Moran has been arrested leads both Dillinger and Barker's gangs to believe he will inform the FBI of their whereabouts, though they all elect to not abandon the dying Hamilton. They agree to instead make a final stand, though the authorities never arrive.

When Hamilton's death appears imminent, Van Meter goes and catches flies with strands of thread, a skill he developed to pass the time when he was in prison. He catches several and shows them to an impressed Hamilton. Dillinger then entertains Hamilton by walking on his hands. While Hamilton is laughing at his antics, Dillinger's revolver falls out of his pants, discharging and injuring him. The occupants realize Dillinger has only grazed his upper lip, shortly before noticing that Hamilton has died. Dillinger and Van Meter bury their friend, and Dillinger says he thinks his notorious run of good luck has ended and that he will be caught soon.

== Film adaptation ==
Stephen King allowed an adaptation of the story to be made in 2012 as part of his "Dollar Baby" deal. An official teaser trailer for the short film was released in September 2012, though the film itself was never released.

== See also ==
- Stephen King short fiction bibliography
