= Dillinger (1991 film) =

1991 television film directed by Rupert Wainwright

- VHS cover
- Genre: Action; Biography; Crime; Drama; History
- Written by: Paul F. Edwards
- Directed by: Rupert Wainwright
- Starring: Mark Harmon; Sherilyn Fenn; Will Patton; Bruce Abbott
- Theme music composer: David McHugh
- Country of origin: United States
- Original language: English

Production
- Executive producer: David L. Wolper
- Producer: Mark Wolper
- Production locations: East Troy, Wisconsin; Mequon, Wisconsin (Shoot out at Little Bohemia Restaurant); Milwaukee, Wisconsin
- Cinematography: Donald M. Morgan
- Editor: Stanford C. Allen
- Running time: 90 minutes
- Production companies: David L. Wolper Productions; Warner Bros. Television

Original release
- Network: ABC
- Release: January 6, 1991

Dillinger is a 1991 television film directed by Rupert Wainwright and starring Mark Harmon as John Dillinger. It was first broadcast as The ABC Sunday Night Movie for January 6, 1991.

== Plot ==
The film is based on the actual events of the pursuit of American bank robber John Dillinger during the 1930s.

== Reception ==
Variety gave the film a mixed review, complimenting the direction and this historical look while taking note of factual errors and questioning the somewhat positive portrayal of Dillinger.

The Chicago Tribune praised Mark Harmon's "steamy portrayal", but also took note of factual inaccuracies and particularly disliked the fact that the movie was shot in Milwaukee, standing in for Chicago, even though historical locations such as the Biograph Theater were still available in Chicago.

Entertainment Weekly strongly disliked the film, giving it a "D" grade and criticizing it as "slow and aimless" and Harmon as "the stiffest sexiest-man-alive imaginable."

== Cast ==
Actor	Role
Mark Harmon	John Dillinger
Sherilyn Fenn	Billie Frechette
Bruce Abbott	Harry Pierpont
Will Patton	Melvin Purvis
Patricia Arquette	Polly Hamilton
Tom Bower	Captain Matt Leach
Xander Berkeley	Copeland
Yvonne Suhor	Jacqueline
John Philbin	John "Red" Hamilton
Amy Yasbeck	Elaine
David Neidorf	Clark
Vince Edwards	J. Edgar Hoover
Lawrence Tierney	Sheriff Sarber
Joe Guzaldo	Samuel P. Cowley
Michelle Schwalbe	Woman in Bar
Tom White	Homer Van Meter
Kurt Naebig	Baby Face Nelson
