= Hunt-Gant Gang =

American outlaw group

- Founded: February 28, 1935
- Founded by: Alva-Dewey Hunt and Hugh Gant
- Founding location: Haines City, Florida
- Years active: 1935-1939
- Territory: Southeastern United States
- Membership (est.): 2
- Criminal activities: Armed robbery

The Hunt-Gant Gang was a Depression-era outlaw group led by Alva-Dewey Hunt and Hugh Gant which was active during the mid-to late 1930s. Although largely unknown on a national scale, their Midwest counterparts receiving the focus of the media, they were the only gang to operate south of the Mason–Dixon line and robbed countless banks throughout the Southeastern United States.

== History ==
The gang's first known robbery took place on February 28, 1935, when they stole $4,000 from a bank in Haines City, Florida. They soon hit another Florida bank in Mulberry on August 1, 1935, and in one of their biggest robberies took $30,459 from a bank in Ybor City on March 3, 1936. Their last major robbery in Foley, Alabama netted only $7,242 as, by that time, they were being pursued by the FBI. With the vast majority of Midwestern "public enemies" having been killed or imprisoned, federal agents turned their attentions towards other parts of the country. The gang managed to evade capture for three and a half years until Hunt and Gant were arrested by authorities in Houston, Texas, convicted on federal bank robbery charges and given long prison sentences.
