= Vivian Chase =

American gangster

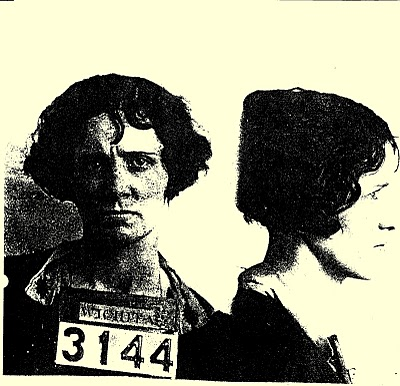
- Mugshot from the Wichita Police Department
- Born: Vivian Davis c. 1902; Missouri
- Died: November 2, 1935; Kansas City, Missouri
- Known for: Crime, gang activities
- Spouse: George M. Chase (1921-1923)

Vivian Davis Chase (c. 1902 – November 2, 1935) was a Midwestern gangster of the 1920s and 1930s.

== Early life ==
There are few sources on Chase's origins and early life. The official record begins in 1920, when the US Census for January 1920 reported an eighteen-year-old Vivian Davis as living in Kansas City, Missouri, who worked as a waitress in a restaurant and her parents listed as Missouri natives, although she was not living with them. Her marriage certificate states she married a certain George M. Chase, also of Kansas City, Missouri, on April 1, 1921, when she was nineteen years old.

Her identity has been incorrectly associated with that of Vivian Grace Davis of Springfield, Missouri, or with that of Albert and Sarah Davis.

== Arrests, escapes and notoriety ==
Chase first gained notice as George's wife on December 23, 1923, when he was arrested for an altercation during which he was shot by Ella Keller. Keller stated that George and his companions attacked her because she had reported them to the police and that she had to shoot George in self-defense. After arresting him, the police went to his home, where they found Chase wearing six diamond rings. She was arrested for suspicion when she could not explain her possession of the multiple rings. She was released three days later when further evidence could not be found against her.

Chase did not surface in public records again until three years later when she was in the company of Charlie Mayes, also known as Pighead Hardman. On February 15, 1926, Chase, Mayes, and Lee Flournoy and his wife were arrested after a free-for-all fight in a rooming house in Wichita, Kansas. During the arrest, Chase refused to talk. The investigation led investigators to her brother-in-law Charles Chase and allegations of involvement with the Joe Bratton liquor gang. On June 9, 1926, following a "drunken party and joy ride", Flournoy and Mayes were fatally shot in a gun battle in Picher, Oklahoma during which Chase was present. The three of them had been under surveillance by Ottawa County, Oklahoma officers for several days because the deputy sheriff had informed the Sheriff of Montgomery County, Kansas that he had found the suspects who robbed the Cherryvale Bank on May 29, 1926. Chase was placed in jail, where she refused to face reporters. She was released on June 13, 1926, after insufficient evidence was found to charge her with a crime.

Chase resurfaced in June 1932, when she was arrested with Jackie Forman and Enos Weeks for the robbery of the First National Bank in North Kansas City on April 9, 1932. She was held on a $50,000 bond. Chase was held at the Clay County Jail in Liberty, Missouri and escaped after four months by sawing through the bars of her cell and lowering herself down with a rope made of bedsheets.

After her escape from the Liberty jail, Chase fled to St. Louis, Missouri, where she became involved with Walter O'Malley. On July 10, 1933, she participated in the kidnapping of banker August Luer. Chase, O'Malley, and Percy "Dice Box" Fitzgerald drove to Mr Luer's home in Alton, Illinois. Chase, accompanied by O'Malley, rang the doorbell and requested to use the phone. When she was let in and shown the phone's location, she cut the line. O'Malley wrestled August Luer to the floor and gagged his mouth. Luer was taken to a farm where he was hidden in a damp underground cellar while his captors tried to collect a ransom for him. Luer is known to have a bad character, and fearing that he would die before they were able to receive any ransom, his kidnappers released him after 123 hours. Both Chase and O'Malley fled from Illinois back to Missouri after the bungled kidnapping. Chase eluded capture, but O'Malley was apprehended in Kansas City on May 23, 1935.

In the early fall of 1935, Kansas City, Missouri experienced a series of drug store robberies. The robbers were described as a man and a woman. The woman was further described as approximately 5 ft. 6 in. tall, slender, with hennaed hair. When victims were shown a photograph, they identified Chase as the female robber.

== Death ==
On November 3, 1935, Chase's body was found in a parked car at Saint Luke's Hospital in Kansas City, MO. She had been shot in the neck with a .45 caliber gun, the bullet exiting through her chest. When she was found, the coroner estimated that she had only been dead 2 hours or less, leading to speculation that her killer drove her to the hospital while she was still alive, expecting her to be found before her death. She had a .22 caliber pistol on her person, with .45 caliber bullets in her handbag. Newspapers speculated that she had been double-crossed by an accomplice and was shot before she could shoot her assailant.

The owner of the funeral home to where she had been removed received an anonymous call asking about funeral costs. The next morning, the funeral home received an envelope of money for the costs, as well as a blue dress and undergarments (her own) for Chase to be buried in. Nine mourners outside of reporters and law enforcement officers attended her funeral.

== See also ==
- List of Depression-era outlaws
