= Clarence Lieder =

Mechanic And Armorer For Chicago's Underworld

Clarence Lieder (August 15, 1906 – January 1969) was a mechanic and armorer for Chicago's underworld and Depression-era criminals, as well as the primary competitor to Joe Bergl. Owner of the Oakley Auto Construction Company, located at the corner of Division Street and Oakley Avenue in Chicago's North Side, Lieder competed with Bergl in supplying both mobster and other criminals with customized automobiles throughout Prohibition and during the early-1930s.

A longtime friend of bank robber George "Baby Face" Nelson, Lieder also hid John Dillinger and Homer Van Meter from authorities after being unable to use their usual Chicago safehouses in early-1934. Shortly after Dillinger's death, Lieder closed his operations and left Chicago in July 1934, disappearing from public record thereafter.
