= Wilhelm Loeser =

American physician and pharmacist

Wilhelm H Loeser
- Born: 8 November 1876; Barby, Posen, Prussia
- Died: 10 July 1953 (aged 76); Oklahoma City, Oklahoma, United States
- Other name: William Loeser
- Occupations: Physician and pharmacist
- Spouse: Bertha M. Loeser - DoD: April 21, 1940, 2nd. Anna E. Loeser -DoD July 20, 1980
- Children: 3
- Status: Released on appeal in 1935.
- Conviction: Drug dealing (1913)
- Penalty: 3 years imprisonment

Wilhelm Loeser (1876–1953) was an American physician and pharmacist who provided medical care to underworld figures during the "Public enemy"-era of the 1930s. His most famous clients were John Dillinger and Homer Van Meter who hired him to perform plastic surgery on them.

== Biography ==
=== Early life ===
Wilhem Loeser was born in Barby, Posen, Prussia on November 8, 1876. At age 12, he emigrated to the United States with his mother and five siblings. The family lived in Iowa for ten years, and then moved on to Kansas. In 1905, Loeser graduated from medical school in Chicago and briefly practiced in Kansas before returning to Chicago. He established himself as a pharmacist and surgeon, once referred to as a "magician with a knife".

=== Crime career ===
Loeser began dealing in narcotics to support his lifestyle. In 1913, he was convicted of that charge and sentenced to three years imprisonment. After serving 18 months, Loeser was paroled with the assistance of lawyer Louis Piquett and fled to Mexico upon his release.

He was brought back to Chicago by Piquett in 1934 after having learned that a $10,000 bribe would allow him to return to the city permanently. In exchange, he agreed to perform cosmetic surgery on fugitive outlaws John Dillinger and Homer Van Meter. Both men wanted their faces altered and their fingerprints removed. Dillinger specifically wanted the removal of several facial scars and moles, a dimple in his chin and a depression on the end of his nose. Van Meter requested similar alterations as well as the removal of an anchor tattoo on his right arm. The outlaws paid up front, Piquett holding the money, and the surgery was performed at the home of Chicago mobster James Probasco from May 27–28, 1934.

Assisted by Dr. Harold Cassidy, Loeser spent nearly 48 hours operating on Dillinger and Van Meter. Given the medical technology of the era and lack of hospital facilities, Loeser was limited in what he could do. He tightened Dillinger's cheeks using kangaroo tendons; however, Dillinger nearly suffocated to death during the operation when he swallowed his tongue under general anesthetic. A caustic solution was used to burn away both men's fingerprints; it apparently failed to erase them completely, however, as Dillinger would be identified by his fingerprints following his death two months later.

His patients were both "mutilated and in agony" at the end of the surgery. As a result, the outlaws were extremely angry with Loeser. Van Meter allegedly threatened Loeser with his Tommy gun "clutched in bandaged hand", but was eventually persuaded to spare the doctor's life. With the surgery considered a failure, Loeser received only $5,000 from Piquett who kept the rest of the money himself.

=== Arrest ===
Two days after Dillinger was shot and killed by federal agents in Chicago, Loeser was arrested in Oak Park, Illinois. Loeser complained of police brutality following his arrest, claiming a beating by FBI agents smashed his nose all over his face, and friends observed "a significant change... in Loeser's appearance" while in federal custody. Loeser agreed to testify against Piquett. However, the defense attorney won a surprise appeal and Loeser was returned to prison for violating his parole from the decades-old narcotics charge. A clemency petition was filed in April 1935 which documented his arrangement with Melvin Purvis and Inspector Sam Cowley and he was released on September 21, 1935. That same day, his assistant Harold Cassidy received a year's probation for his part in the surgery.
