= John Hamilton (gangster) =

Canadian criminal and bank robber (1898–1934)

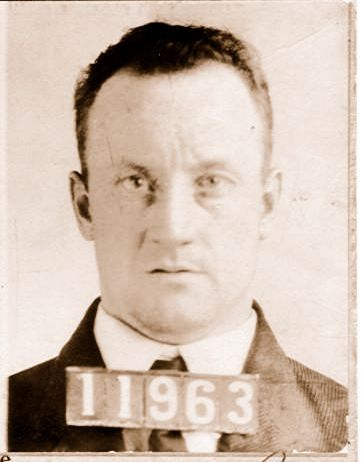
- Mugshot of John "Red" Hamilton.
- Born: August 27, 1898; Byng Inlet, Ontario, Canada
- Died: April 26, 1934 (aged 35); Aurora, Illinois, United States
- Cause of death: Complications from gunshot wound
- Other names: Red; Three-Finger Jack
- Occupations: Bank robber; killer
- Known for: Criminal partner of John Dillinger

John "Red" Hamilton (August 27, 1898 – April 26, 1934) was a Canadian criminal and bank robber active in the 1920s–1930s, most notably as an associate of John Dillinger. He is best known for his lingering death and secret burial after being mortally wounded during a robbery.

== Early life ==
Little is known of John Hamilton's life prior to his criminal career. He was born on August 27, 1898, in Byng Inlet, Ontario, Canada, to an Irish-Canadian father from Essex County, Ontario and a German-American woman from New York. Hamilton was nicknamed "Three-Finger Jack", having lost two of his right fingers in a sledding accident when he was young.

== Prison break ==
On March 16, 1927, he was convicted of the robbery of a gas station in St. Joseph County, Indiana, and sentenced to 25 years in prison.

While incarcerated in Indiana State Prison in Michigan City, Hamilton befriended a number of prominent bank robbers, such as John Dillinger, Russell Clark, Charles Makley, Harry Pierpont and Homer Van Meter.

Dillinger was paroled in May 1933, but swore to liberate his friends, and had handguns smuggled in to Hamilton, Makley, Pierpont, Clark and several other convicts. On September 26, 1933, a total of ten armed men, including Hamilton, escaped from the main gate of Indiana State Prison.

== Crime spree ==
Soon afterwards the gang learned that Dillinger had in the meantime been arrested for bank robbery and was being detained at the Allen County Jail in Lima, Ohio. Determined to free Dillinger, the gang needed cash to fund an escape. On October 3, 1933, the gang robbed the First National Bank of St. Marys, Ohio, escaping with $14,000 (equivalent to $348,000 in 2025).

Nine days later, Hamilton accompanied Charles Makley, Harry Pierpont, Russell Clark, and Ed Shouse to the Lima jail where Dillinger was being held, although he did not enter the building, and did not participate in Makley and Pierpont's murder of Allen County Sheriff Jess Sarber.

On December 13, 1933, the Dillinger gang executed an armed invasion of a Chicago bank, to empty its safe deposit boxes, netting the gang as much as $50,000 (equivalent to $1,244,000 in 2025). A day later, after Hamilton had left his car at a Chicago garage for some body work, the garage's mechanic called police with his suspicion that it was a "gangster car". When Hamilton returned to pick up the car and found a police detective, William Shanley and two other officers waiting to question him, he opened fire, killing Shanley, and managing to elude capture by the other two officers. This incident led to the Chicago Police Department forming a forty-man Dillinger Squad.

On January 15, 1934, Hamilton and Dillinger robbed the First National Bank in East Chicago, Indiana, for $20,376 (equivalent to $490,000 in 2025). During the heist, police officer William O'Malley was shot dead. Dillinger was officially charged with the murder, but several witnesses indicated that Hamilton was the shooter. By the end of the year, Hamilton found himself ranked third on Indiana's list of "public enemies", after Dillinger and Harry Pierpont.

Hamilton, himself shot twice during the East Chicago robbery, was left in the care of his girlfriend Pat Cherrington and underworld physician Joseph Moran, while Dillinger and the others headed to Tucson where they were apprehended by the authorities. After this incident, for a short time, Hamilton was at the top of the public enemies list, until Dillinger managed to escape from Crown Point, and mustered a new gang that consisted of Hamilton, Homer Van Meter, Tommy Carroll, Eddie Green, and Baby Face Nelson.

Hamilton subsequently accompanied the gang on a string of lucrative, but chaotic armed robberies. On March 6, three days after Dillinger's escape, the gang robbed the Security National Bank & Trust Company in Sioux Falls, South Dakota. In the robbery, a motorcycle cop named Hale Keith was severely wounded when Nelson shot him down through a plate glass window. A week later, the gang robbed the First National Bank in Mason City, Iowa. Hamilton was wounded yet again – shot in the shoulder by an elderly judge across the street, who also managed to wound Dillinger.

Now the subjects of a massive manhunt and media campaign, Hamilton and Dillinger made a discreet visit to Hamilton's sister's home in Sault Ste. Marie, Michigan, on April 17. After returning to Chicago, the gang retreated to the Little Bohemia resort near Rhinelander, Wisconsin. On April 22, the place was raided by the FBI under the direction of Melvin Purvis, who had received a tip about the gang's whereabouts from Henry Voss, a friend of Emil Wanatka, Little Bohemia's owner. Unfortunately, the raid did not go as planned: the agents mistakenly opened fire on a car that contained three local work camp employees – Eugene Boisneau, John Hoffman and John Morris – after thinking they were gangsters. Boisneau was killed and Hoffman and Morris were both wounded.

Dillinger, Hamilton, Van Meter and Tommy Carroll escaped by jumping from a second floor window in the back of the lodge onto a mound of frozen snow, then running along the shore of Star Lake. Dillinger, Hamilton and Van Meter eventually stole a car from a carpenter a half mile northwest of Little Bohemia.

== Death and rumors of survival ==
A day later, on April 23, Hamilton, Dillinger and Homer Van Meter were again confronted by authorities in Hastings, Minnesota, and another shootout ensued. Hamilton was mortally wounded by a bullet as he and the rest of the gang escaped in a car. The gang again took him to see doctor Joseph Moran in Chicago. For some reason, Moran refused to treat Hamilton. Dillinger then hid the dying Hamilton with Volney Davis and Edna Murray in Aurora, Illinois. Hamilton reportedly died on April 26, 1934. Dillinger and Davis buried their friend near Oswego, Illinois, and Dillinger reportedly covered Hamilton's face and hands with lye, to hinder any later attempt to identify the body.

Not yet knowing that Hamilton had died almost three weeks earlier, authorities indicted him on May 19 of harboring fugitives. Hamilton's sister was convicted of the same charge, and spent a short time in prison.

There were at the time several persistent rumors that Hamilton was actually still alive. The FBI received numerous tips from people claiming to have seen or heard from Hamilton. Even Hamilton's nephew maintained that he had personally visited his uncle in Ontario after his supposed death.

Nevertheless, no hard evidence for Hamilton's survival has ever been discovered. The amalgam restorations on the teeth of the body identified by Davis and Murray as Hamilton's were compared with his dental records from Indiana state penitentiary and were matched.

== Portrayal ==
- Hamilton's death and burial are depicted in the 1957 film Baby Face Nelson; Hamilton is played by Anthony Caruso.
- In the 1965 film Young Dillinger, John Hamilton was portrayed by Dan Terranova.
- In the 1973 film Dillinger Hamilton's mortal wounding and burial are shown as that of Dillinger gang member Charles Mackley. (Mackley actually died in prison.)
- In the 1991 TV film Dillinger, Hamilton was portrayed by John Philbin.
- Hamilton's last days are the subject of the Stephen King short story "The Death of Jack Hamilton" (originally published in 2001).
- In the 2009 film Public Enemies, Jason Clarke plays the role of Hamilton. In the film, Hamilton is shown as having all five fingers on his right hand, when in reality he only had three having lost two fingers in a childhood accident.
