= Volney Davis =

American bank robber and Great Depression-era outlaw

- Born: January 29, 1902; Cherokee Nation, Oklahoma, U.S.
- Died: July 20, 1979 (aged 77); Oregon, U.S.
- Other name: Curley
- Occupation: Bank robber
- Spouse: Edna Murray
- Status: Paroled from Alcatraz in the 1950s
- Conviction: Kidnapping
- Penalty: Life imprisonment

Volney Everett "Curley" Davis (February 14, 1902 – July 20, 1979) was an American bank robber and Great Depression-era outlaw. A longtime Oklahoma bandit, he was the boyfriend of Edna Murray and an associate of both the John Dillinger and Alvin Karpis-Barker gangs during the 1930s.

== Biography ==
Born in Cherokee Nation, Oklahoma, Volney Davis was first imprisoned in 1919 when he was 17. He was sentenced to three years for grand larceny at the Oklahoma State Penitentiary; his crime was stealing a pair of shoes.

Davis was an early member of the Tulsa-based Central Park Gang during the 1920s, where he first met the Barker Gang, and committed his first major robbery with Arthur "Doc" Barker when they burglarized St. John Hospital in Tulsa. The night watchman, Thomas J. Sherrill, was killed during the robbery. Barker was arrested about 5 months later for the murder; however, Davis evaded authorities for nearly a year before he was captured. He was sentenced to life imprisonment for his role in the robbery. In February 1923 (or January 1925), he briefly escaped from the state penitentiary in McAlester, participating in a mass escape with several other convicts by using ropes and a ladder to climb over the wall, but was recaptured almost two weeks later.

Seven years later, Davis applied for a 20-month "leave of absence" from the prison which was granted on November 3, 1932. Such leniency was common in Oklahoma during that time, even with such a criminal record as his, although Alvin Karpis later claimed that the state's decision was influenced by a $1,500 bribe. He was scheduled to return to the prison on July 1, 1934, but Davis went on the run instead. A month after his release, he reunited with girlfriend Edna Murray, who herself had escaped from prison for a third time. The couple joined the Alvin Karpis-Barker Gang who were then at the peak of their activities and in the midst of a major crime spree. Davis and Murray were later implicated in the kidnapping of St. Paul banker Edward Bremer who was successfully ransomed for $200,000.

Davis received an unscheduled visit from John Dillinger and Homer Van Meter at his home in Aurora, Illinois. They had brought John "Red" Hamilton, who had been mortally wounded days earlier in a running gunfight in Minnesota hours after their escape from Little Bohemia Lodge. Davis agreed to hide Hamilton in his home and, with Murray, looked after him until he died of his wounds a few days later. Dillinger, Doc Barker, Van Meter, and Davis later buried Hamilton in an unmarked grave.

Davis and Murray were never charged with the holdups he committed while part of the Karpis-Barker Gang. However, they were indicted for the Bremer kidnapping on January 22, 1935. A little over two weeks later, Davis was captured in St. Louis by federal agents on February 6, but escaped from federal custody the next day. He had been traveling under escort to stand trial in St. Paul when their plane was forced to land in Yorkville, Illinois. Once on the ground, Davis knocked out a guard and stole a car. He evaded capture for nearly four months before being traced to Chicago by the FBI and arrested by Agent Melvin Purvis on June 1. He was eventually returned to St. Paul where he was convicted of kidnapping and sentenced to life imprisonment. Davis cooperated with the government and gave information as well as testified against other members of the gang.

Like the rest of the Karpis-Barker Gang, Davis was sent to Alcatraz, where he spent the next two decades. He did not participate in the escape attempt organized by Arthur Barker in 1939. There are claims that he became involved in a violent fistfight with Karpis, which he won. By the time of his release in the late 1950s, however, he was in poor health. Davis died in Oregon on July 20, 1979.
