= Barker–Karpis Gang =

1930s American criminal gang

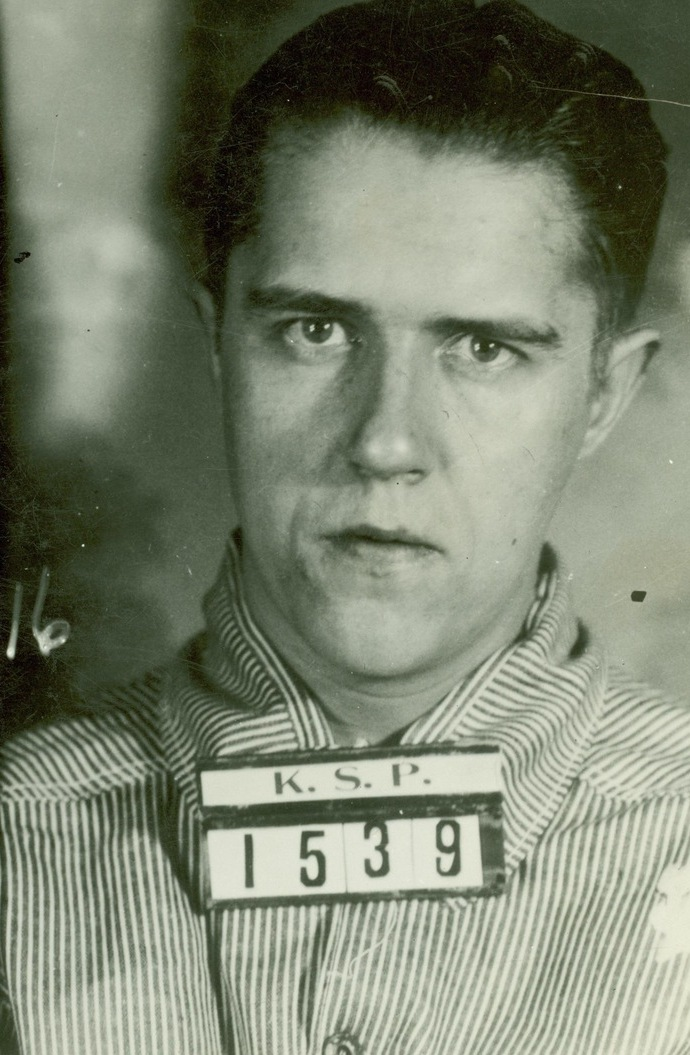
Alvin Karpis

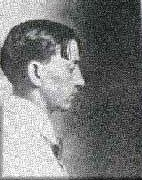
Herman Barker

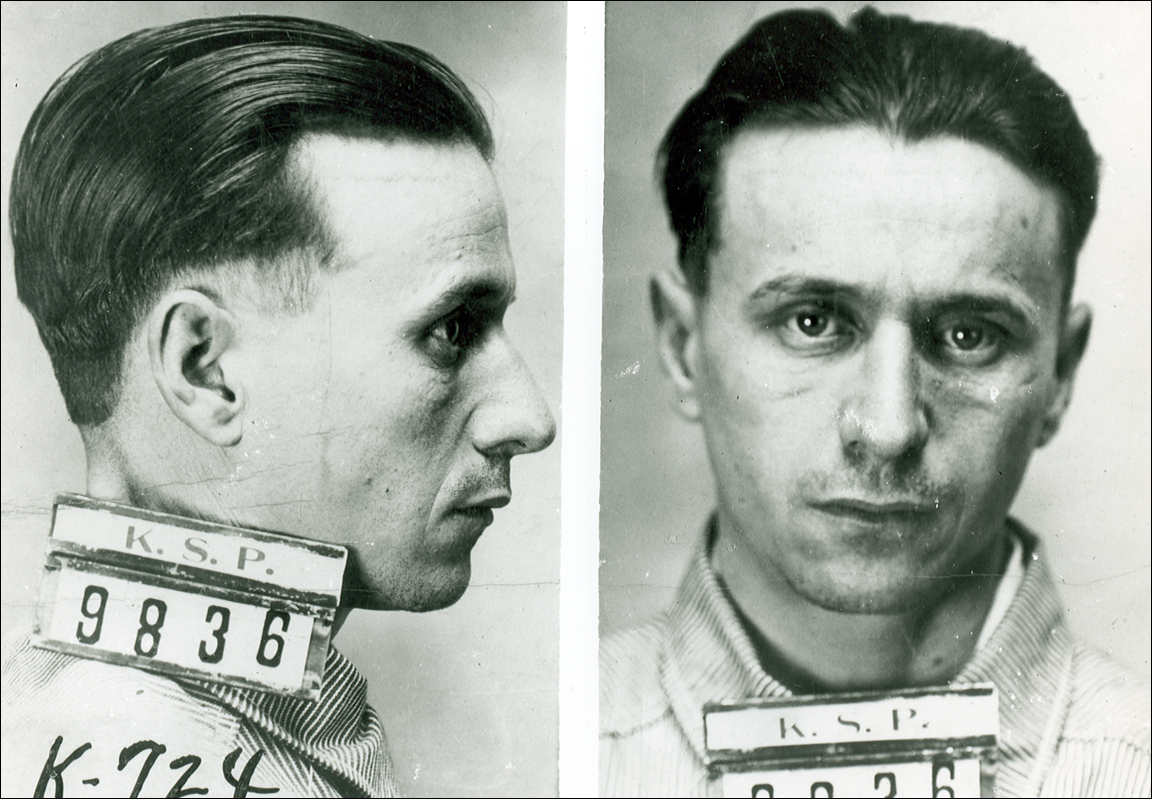
Fred Barker

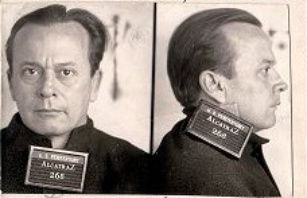
Arthur "Doc" Barker

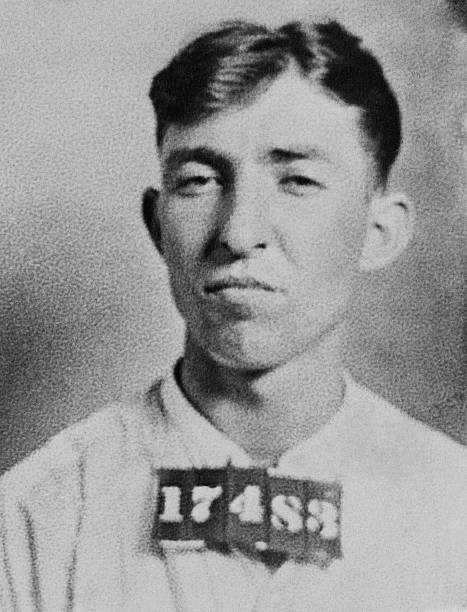
Eddie Green

The Barker–Karpis Gang was one of the longest-lived criminal gangs during the Depression Era, spanning from 1931 to 1935. The gang was founded by Fred Barker and Alvin Karpis, and later joined by Fred's brother Arthur "Doc" Barker. Along with the three core members, the gang's network spanned up to 25 members at one point.

Although not as well known as their contemporaries the Dillinger Gang, or the Barrow Gang, the Barker–Karpis Gang was perhaps more ruthless, not only committing bank robberies, but also extending the activities into kidnapping. It is best known for the myth that it was run by the Barker brothers' mother, Kate, usually referred to as "Ma Barker".

== Foundations ==
The Barker–Karpis gang was put together by Fred Barker and Alvin Karpis in March 1931. Barker and Karpis had met in the Kansas State Penitentiary, and upon Karpis's release in March 1931, started to form the gang. The gang began robbing banks starting in mid-1931, but on December 19 of that year, they killed Howell County Sheriff Calvin Roy Kelly in West Plains, Missouri. They fled to Joplin, and then to Saint Paul, Minnesota, where Jewish-American organized crime boss Harry Sawyer (born Harry Sandlovich) found them a house at 1031 Robert Street South, owned by Helen Hannegraff. They used the name "Anderson", but a few weeks later, Helen's son Nick recognized Alvin's and Fred's photos in a copy of True Detective Magazine, and contacted the police. St. Paul's corrupt chief of police, Thomas Brown, tipped the Barkers off and they left town. Doc Barker later joined the gang in 1932 after he was paroled from the Oklahoma State Penitentiary in McAlester, where he had been serving a life sentence for the murder of night watchman Thomas J. Sherrill in 1921. The gang was led by the three of them, although many others rotated in and out of the gang including Chicago Outfit mobster Fred Goetz and Volney Davis. The gang continued their bank robbing activities until mid-1933, when they decided that robbing banks was becoming risky, and therefore decided to diverge into the field of kidnapping. Their graduation to more serious crime was mentored by Detective Brown.

== Hamm and Bremer kidnappings ==
On June 15, 1933, the Barker–Karpis gang kidnapped William Hamm Jr. of Hamm's Brewery and released him on June 19, 1933. The ransom from this kidnapping netted $100,000. They then kidnapped Edward Bremer in daylight in St. Paul, Minnesota in January 1934, releasing him in February. The ransom from this kidnapping turned out to be $200,000. However, these kidnappings brought too much negative publicity, due to the recent Urschel and Lindbergh kidnappings, and the fact that the father of Bremer Jr. was a personal friend of President Franklin D. Roosevelt, who mentioned the kidnappings in a fireside chat. On November 27, 1934, Lester "Baby Face Nelson" Gillis, at that time the Public Enemy No. 1, was mortally wounded in a gun battle with the FBI and died later that night. The next day, Alvin Karpis was declared Public Enemy No. 1, which brought the full force of the FBI down on the Barker–Karpis Gang.

== Downfall ==
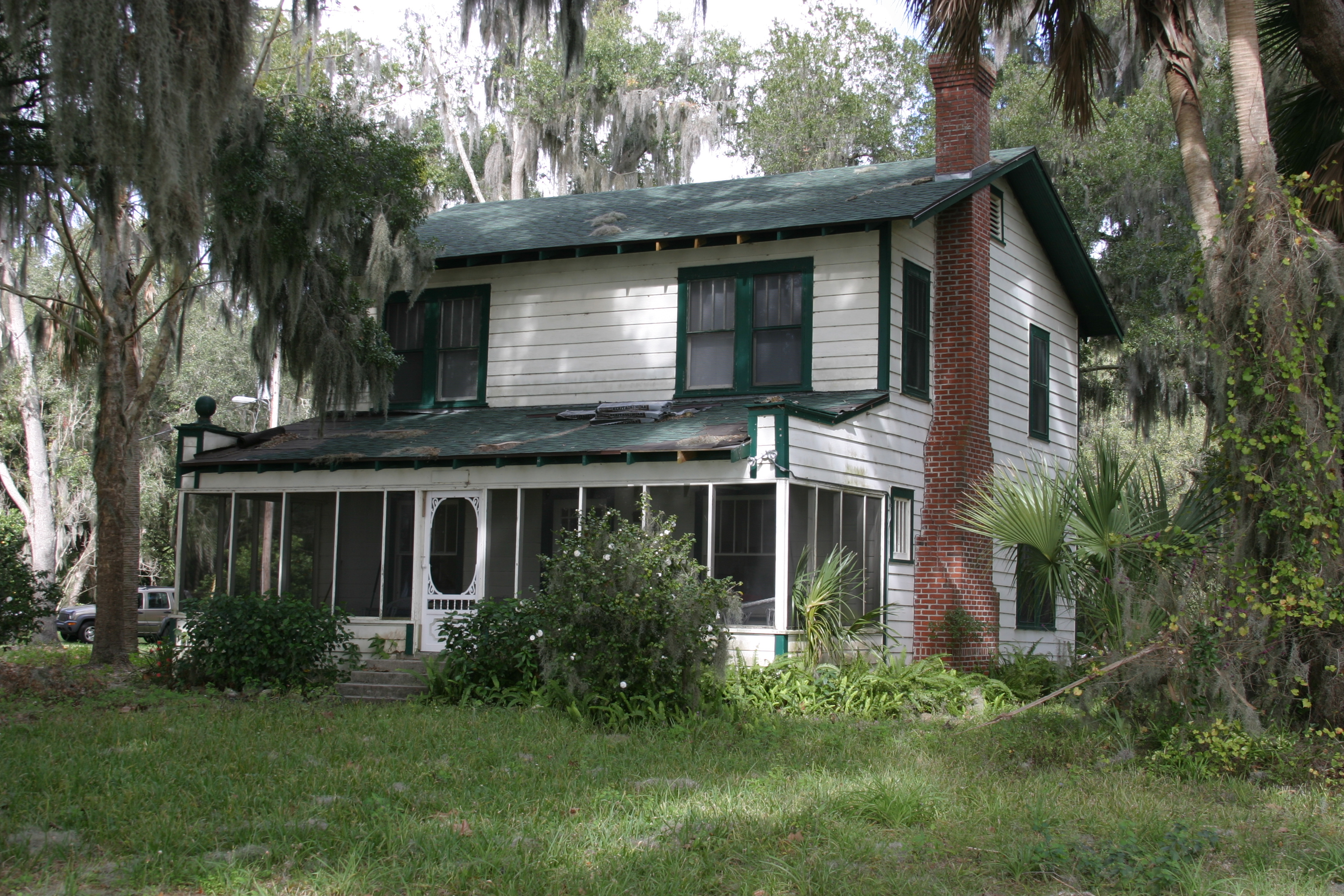
The cottage in which Ma and Fred Barker were killed. They both died in the upper left bedroom.

The gang had faced problems. George "Shotgun" Ziegler had been gunned down in Cicero, Illinois in March 1934, possibly due to the mob's dislike of the gang's activities. Gang member William J. Harrison was killed on January 6 by fellow members of the gang. Following the declaration of Alvin Karpis as Public Enemy No. 1, Doc Barker was arrested on January 8, 1935, along with Byron Bolton. Russell "Slim Gray" Gibson was killed resisting the arrest. Along with his arrest came a map and letters to a cottage near Lake Weir, Florida, near Ocklawaha, in which Fred Barker and his mother, Kate "Ma" Barker were hiding under an assumed name. After a four-hour shootout on January 16, 1935, Fred and Ma Barker were killed. Controversy remains as to whether Ma Barker participated in the shootout, or was even a criminal at all. Alvin Karpis was nearly gunned down in Atlantic City, New Jersey, around the same time.

Karpis stayed on the move for another 16 months, pulling an armored car robbery and a train robbery in April and October 1935, before finally being arrested in New Orleans on May 1, 1936, alongside new accomplice Fred Hunter. Although Director J. Edgar Hoover personally claimed credit for Karpis's arrest, Hoover and the official FBI account of the arrest remains in question. Karpis offers his own version of the arrest in his book, The Alvin Karpis Story. The arrest of Karpis brought the FBI to fame and skyrocketed their public standing, along with J. Edgar Hoover's reputation.

== Aftermath ==
Doc Barker was sent to Alcatraz Federal Penitentiary in California in the summer of 1935. Alvin Karpis soon followed upon his own arrest and is notable for being in Alcatraz longer than any other convict. Many other members of the gang ended up at Alcatraz. Doc Barker ended up being shot dead while attempting to escape the prison in 1939.

During the 1960s, while at McNeil Island Penitentiary in Washington State, Karpis began to teach guitar to the young Charles Manson, then known as “Little Charlie”. Karpis was sympathetic to Manson‘s tumultuous, institutionalized upbringing which saw him in countless orphanages, reformatories, and prisons all throughout his young life. Karpis later wrote “it (was) time someone did something for him.” He later said, "There was something unmistakably unusual about Manson. He was a runt of sorts, but found his place as an experienced manipulator of others. I did feel manipulated, and under circumstances where it hadn't been necessary."

Karpis was paroled in 1969, and deported to Canada. He moved to Spain in 1973. Karpis co-wrote two books with professional authors, one released in 1971 titled The Alvin Karpis Story, the other, released in 1979, titled On the Rock. He died on August 30, 1979, of natural causes, though it was initially believed to be a suicide or the result of foul play.

== Summary of Barker–Karpis Gang activities ==
=== Background ===
==== 1900–1920 ====
- 1910—Herman Barker arrested for highway robbery in Webb City, Missouri.
- March 5, 1915—Herman Barker arrested for highway robbery in Joplin, Missouri. (Herman and Lloyd Barker reportedly involved with the Central Park Gang of Tulsa, Oklahoma.)
- July 4, 1918—Arthur "Doc" Barker involved in US automobile theft in Tulsa, Oklahoma; arrested (#841) (escaped).

==== 1920–1929 ====
- February 19, 1920—Arthur Barker arrested in Joplin, Missouri (#1740); returned to Tulsa, Oklahoma.
- 1921—Lloyd "Red" Barker arrested for vagrancy in Tulsa, Oklahoma.
- January 15, 1921—Arthur Barker aka "Claude Dade" involved in attempted bank robbery in Muskogee, Oklahoma; arrested (#822).
- January 30, 1921—Arthur Barker aka "Bob Barker" received at the Oklahoma State Prison (#11059); released June 11, 1921.
- August 16, 1921—Arthur Barker and Volney Davis involved in killing of night watchman Thomas J. Sherrill in Tulsa, Oklahoma. (According to other sources) Thomas J. Sherrill. was a night watchman at St. John's Hospital in Tulsa.)
- January 8, 1922—Central Park Gang involved in attempted burglary in Okmulgee, Oklahoma; shootout results in one burglar dead while police Captain Homer R. Spaulding dies of his wounds on January 19, 1922. One gang member is sentenced to life in prison while another had his sentence overturned.
- January 16, 1922—Lloyd Barker received at Leavenworth Prison (#17243) after arrest for robbing mail at Baxter Springs, Kansas and sentenced to 25 years; released 1938.
- February 10, 1922—Arthur "Doc" Barker received (#11906) at Oklahoma State Prison for the murder of Sherrill.
- 1926—Fred Barker robbed bank in Winfield, Kansas; arrested.
- March 12, 1927—Fred Barker admitted to Kansas State Prison.
- August 1, 1927-Herman Barker cashed stolen bank bonds at the America National Bank in Cheyenne, WY. Sheriff Deputy Arthur Osborn flagged down Barker's car. Barker picked up a gun from the vehicle's seat and shot Osborn. Osborn died as a result.
- August 29, 1927—Herman Barker commits suicide in Wichita, Kansas after being stopped at police roadblock. (Wichita Policeman J.E. Marshall) had been killed on August 9, 1927, by the Kimes-Terrill Gang that Herman was associated with. Five other policemen were killed by the Kimes gang.

=== Barker–Karpis gang ===
==== 1930–1939 ====
- March 30, 1931—Fred Barker released from Kansas State Prison after serving time for burglary; met Alvin Karpis in prison.
- June 10, 1931—Fred Barker and Alvin Karpis (alias George Heller) arrested by Tulsa, Oklahoma, police investigating burglary. Karpis sentenced to four years but paroled after restitution made; Fred Barker also avoided jail sentence.
- November 8, 1931—Fred Barker killed an Arkansas police chief Manley Jackson.
- December 19, 1931—Fred Barker and Alvin Karpis robbed a store in West Plains, Missouri, and involved in the killing of Howell County, Missouri, sheriff C. Roy Kelly.
- January 18, 1932—Lloyd Barker received at Leavenworth Prison.
- April 26, 1932—Body of Ma Barker's lover A. W. Dunlap found at Lake Franstead, Minnesota; killed by Fred Barker and Alvin Karpis.
- June 17, 1932—Fred Barker, Karpis and five accomplices robbed Fort Scott, Kansas Bank.
- July 26, 1932—Fred Barker, Karpis (with an augmented gang) robbed Cloud County bank at Concordia, Kansas.
- August 13, 1932—Attorney J. Earl Smith of Tulsa, Oklahoma, found killed at Indian Hills Country Club north of Tulsa; he had been retained to defend Harvey Bailey over the Fort Scott bank robbery, but the man was convicted.
- On July 25, 1932, Barker, Karpis, DeVol, Jess Doyle and Earl Christman robbed the Cloud County Bank at Concordia, Kansas, and made off with about $250,000 in cash and bonds.
- On August 18, they pulled a second job at the Second National Bank of Beloit, Wisconsin, for $50,000.
- September 10, 1932—Arthur "Doc" Barker released from prison.
- December 16, 1932—Fred and Arthur Barker, Alvin Karpis and gang robbed Third Northwestern National Bank in Minneapolis, killing policemen Ira Leon Evans and Leo Gorski and one civilian. (One gang member Lawrence DeVol in this shooting was also involved in four other police killings-two police officers, Sheriff William Sweet and City Marshal Aaron Bailey, in Washington, Iowa, and Marshall John W. Rose in Kirksville, Missouri, on November 17, 1930, and killing officer Cal Palmer and wounding another officer before being gunned down in Enid, Oklahoma, in 1936.)
- April 4, 1933—Fred and Arthur Barker, Alvin Karpis and gang robbed Fairbury, Nebraska, bank.
- June 1933—William Hamm of the Hamm's Brewery family kidnapped by Barker–Karpis gang; Hamm released June 19, 1933, after ransom paid. It is believed by some that the gang turned over half of the Hamm ransom money to the Chicago Mob under Frank Nitti after Nitti discovered that they were hiding Hamm in suburban Chicago and demanded half the ransom as "rent".
- August 30, 1933—Barker–Karpis Gang robs a payroll at Stockyards National Bank of South St. Paul, Minnesota, in which one policeman Leo Pavlak is coldly executed and one disabled for life.
- September 22, 1933—Two bank messengers held up by five men identified as Barker–Karpis gang; Chicago policeman Miles A Cunningham is killed by the gang after their car crashed during the getaway. (Barker–Karpis gang associate Vernon Miller was allegedly involved in the killing, and reportedly also involved in the Kansas City Massacre in which four lawmen were killed).
- January 17, 1934—Gang kidnaps Edward George Bremer, Jr.; Bremer released on February 7, 1934, after ransom paid.
- January 19, 1934—Gang wounds M.C. McCord of Northwest Airways Company, thinking he was a policeman.
- March 10, 1934—Barker gang member Fred Goetz (also known as "Shotgun George" Ziegler, a participant in the Bremer kidnapping) killed by fellow gangsters in Cicero, Illinois.
- April 1934-Doc Barker and associate Volney Davis get a surprise visit from John Dillinger and Homer Van Meter, helping them bury their comrade John "Red" Hamilton after Hamilton died from gunshot wounds sustained in a shootout in St. Paul, Minnesota.
- July 1934—Underworld doctor Joseph Moran last seen alive.
- January 6, 1935—Barker gang member William B. Harrison killed by fellow gangsters at Ontarioville, Illinois.
- January 8, 1935—Arthur "Doc" Barker arrested in Chicago; Barker gang member Russell Gibson killed and his colleague Byron Bolton captured at another address.
- January 16, 1935—Fred and Ma Barker killed by FBI in Ocklawaha, Florida (Marion County). Ma Barker was discovered by the FBI tracking her letters sent to her other son. She was writing to him to tell him about a large gator in Lake Weir that everyone had called "Gator Joe", which led to the name of the local restaurant known as "Gator Joe's".
- September 26, 1935—The supposed body of underworld doctor Joseph Moran found in Lake Erie; believed killed by Fred Barker and Alvin Karpis. (However, Karpis himself said that Moran had been buried.)
- November 7, 1935—Karpis and five accomplices robbed an Erie Railroad mail train at Garrettsville, Ohio.
- May 1, 1936—Karpis and accomplice Fred Hunter arrested in New Orleans, Louisiana.
- January 13, 1939—Arthur Barker killed trying to escape from Alcatraz Prison.https://www.alcatrazhistory.com/escapes1.htm

(Of Barker–Karpis gang/associates: 18 arrested; 3 killed by lawmen; 2 killed by gangsters)

=== Later events ===
- World War II - Lloyd Barker was a US Army cook at POW camp Fort Custer, Michigan; received US Army Good Conduct Medal and Honorable Discharge.
- March 18, 1949 — Lloyd Barker was killed by his wife; he was manager of Denargo Market in Denver, Colorado; she was sent to Colorado State Insane Asylum.

== Related Pages ==
- Bob Pavlak (1924-1994), American police officer and politician
