= Homer Van Meter =

American criminal and bank robber (1905–1934)

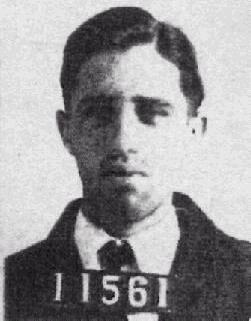
- FBI mug shot of Homer Van Meter
- Born: Homer Virgil Van Meter; December 3, 1905; Fort Wayne, Indiana, U.S.
- Died: August 23, 1934 (aged 28); St. Paul, Minnesota, U.S.
- Cause of death: Gunshot wounds
- Criminal charges: Drunk and disorderly conduct, larceny, motor vehicle theft, armed robbery
- Penalty: Imprisonment from January to December, 1924; 1925 to 1933 (paroled)

Homer Virgil Van Meter (December 3, 1905 – August 23, 1934) was an American criminal and bank robber active in the early 20th century, most notably as a criminal associate of John Dillinger and Baby Face Nelson.

== Biography ==
=== Early life ===
Van Meter was born to Cary V. Van Meter and Julia Miller in 1905 (according to other sources December 3, 1906) in Fort Wayne, Indiana, the son of an alcoholic railroad conductor. During the sixth grade, Van Meter ran away from home, eventually ending up in Chicago, Illinois, where he worked as a bellhop and a waiter.

He was arrested for the first time as a teenager, for drunk and disorderly conduct. In Aurora, Illinois, on June 23, 1923, Van Meter was sentenced to 41 days in jail for larceny. On January 11, 1924, he was sentenced for motor vehicle theft and incarcerated in Southern Illinois Penitentiary. At the time of his admission, he had a tattoo reading "HOPE" on one forearm.

Van Meter was paroled in December 1924. Three months later, he teamed up with an old cellmate to rob the passengers of a train in Crown Point, Indiana. He was caught and convicted of the crime, and received a sentence of 10 to 21 years, to be served in the Indiana Reformatory.

=== Meeting John Dillinger ===
While in the Indiana Reformatory, Van Meter met John Dillinger and Harry Pierpont. Whereas Van Meter befriended Dillinger, he and Pierpont openly despised each other, largely because of Van Meter's clowning antics and demeanor. On July 28, 1925, Van Meter's repeated joking and violation of the Indiana Reformatory rules earned him a transfer to the state prison at Michigan City.

=== Escape attempts ===
In January 1926, Van Meter was transported to Chicago to testify in defense of a man wrongly suspected of being his accomplice for the train robbery in Crown Point. He escaped from the transport at Union Station, but was quickly apprehended by his captors while begging for change on the street. A week later, Van Meter attempted another escape, this time with cellmate Charles Stewart. After sawing through the bars of their cell, the two beat a corrections officer unconscious but were caught before leaving the prison. As a penalty, he spent the next two months in solitary confinement, where he was severely beaten by prison guards.

=== Crime wave ===
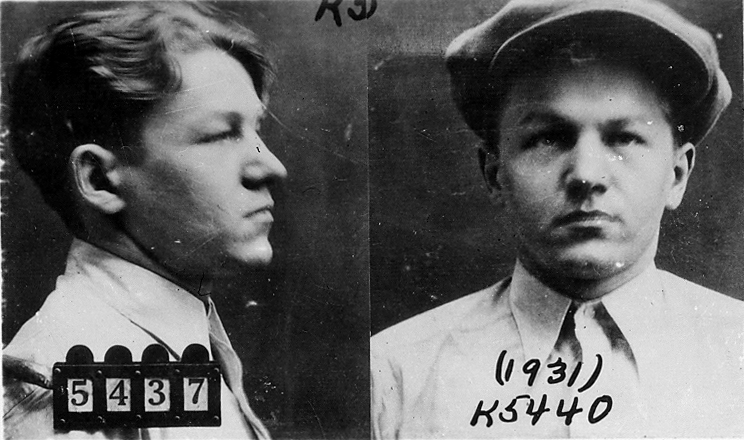
1931 Mugshot of Lester Gillis aka George "Baby Face" Nelson

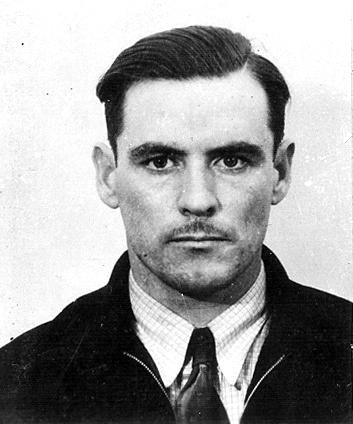
John Paul Chase

Afterwards, Van Meter affected a reformation sufficient to allow the parole board to release him on May 19, 1933, one week after Dillinger had made parole. On August 18, Van Meter aligned himself with Baby Face Nelson and Tommy Carroll to rob a bank in Grand Haven, Michigan. They got away with $30,000. On October 23, the trio, along with John Paul Chase and Charles "Chuck" Fisher, robbed a bank in Brainerd, Minnesota, escaping with $32,000. When Illinois published its list of "public enemies" at the end of 1933, Van Meter ranked 18th.

==== The Second Dillinger Gang ====
Dillinger broke out of prison in Crown Point, Indiana, on March 3, 1934. Dillinger and John "Red" Hamilton later joined the gang. On March 6, Dillinger, Nelson, Van Meter, Carroll, Eddie Green, and Hamilton robbed the Security National Bank & Trust Company in Sioux Falls, South Dakota. The gang escaped with $49,500 to their hideout in St. Paul, Minnesota. One week later, on March 13, the men robbed the First National Bank in Mason City, Iowa, for $52,000. On April 12, Dillinger and Van Meter robbed a police station in Warsaw, Indiana, stealing firearms and bulletproof vests.

Because of this level of criminal activity, Van Meter and the gang became the subject of an intense FBI manhunt. Eddie Green was ambushed and killed by the FBI on April 3. Days earlier, Van Meter, Dillinger, and Dillinger's girlfriend Billie Frechette had narrowly escaped from police in St. Paul after a gunfight. Later, on April 23, while fleeing from Little Bohemia Lodge, Dillinger, Van Meter and Hamilton were involved in a gun battle in Hastings, Minnesota. Hamilton was mortally wounded and died four days later at the house of Volney Davis. Dillinger, Van Meter, and members of the Barker Gang buried him in a gravel pit near Oswego, Illinois.

On May 3, Van Meter, Dillinger, and Carroll robbed the First National Bank in Fostoria, Ohio, during which Van Meter shot and wounded local police chief Frank Culp. The three spent most of May hiding in a woodland cabin near East Chicago, Indiana. On May 24, while driving a red panel truck, Van Meter and Dillinger were stopped by Detectives Martin O'Brien and Lloyd Mulvihill of the East Chicago Police Department. Van Meter gunned down both officers with his Tommy gun. On June 7, Carroll was killed in a gunfight in Waterloo, Iowa.

A few days later, in an attempt to conceal their identities, both Dillinger and Van Meter underwent plastic surgery at the hands of Wilhelm Loeser in the apartment of Jimmy Probasco, a bar owner connected to the Chicago Outfit. Loeser operated on Van Meter on June 3. Unsatisfied with the results and, not coincidentally, with the pain of the operation, Van Meter attempted to kill Loeser on the spot.

On June 30, Van Meter, Dillinger, Baby Face Nelson, and an unidentified fourth man robbed the Merchants National Bank in South Bend, Indiana. During the robbery, Van Meter shot and killed South Bend police officer Howard Wagner, but was also shot in the head himself and wounded. The fourth man, never identified, has been suggested at times to be Pretty Boy Floyd, Johnny Chase, or Fatso Negri. It was the last confirmed raid for all of the confirmed and suspected participants.

On July 22, 1934, a combined force of FBI agents led by Melvin Purvis and Samuel P. Cowley and East Chicago cops led by Detective Martin Zarkevych ambushed and gunned down John Dillinger outside the Biograph Theater in Chicago. That night, Van Meter and his girlfriend Marie Comforti fled to St. Paul.

=== Death ===
On August 23, at the corner of Marion Street and University Avenue in Saint Paul, Minnesota, Van Meter was confronted by four police officers, including Chief Frank Cullen, Detective Tom Brown, and two other men, all heavily armed with shotguns and Thompson submachine guns. Brown was a former police chief who had been notorious for his willingness to take bribes from criminals. Van Meter had previously helped to fund Brown's bid to become sheriff. By this time Brown had been demoted and was under investigation for corruption and allegations that he had been an accomplice to the Barker–Karpis gang in the kidnappings of William Hamm and Edward Bremer. The FBI were interviewing captured former criminal associates.

The officers later claimed Van Meter ignored their command to stop and fled into a nearby alley, where he fired twice on the officers with a .380 caliber pistol. Chief of Police Frank Cullen, armed with a rifle, held his fire as a bystander walked into the line of fire, but the remaining officers opened fire on Van Meter, who fell dead. He was 28 years old. Brown continued to fire at Van Meter as he lay prone; the impact of the bullets ripped off one finger and nearly severed a thumb and finger of the right hand. The body was found to be armed with a .380 caliber Colt automatic pistol. The number and severity of Van Meter's wounds were attributed to the use of the shotguns; Van Meter's family later said that their kin had been used for "target practice".

According to Ramsey County Coroner, he was hit by 26 buckshot slugs and a single machine gun bullet – all entry wounds in the back. The four officers reported $1,323 found on Van Meter, although his friends and associates claimed he was carrying at least $10,000 on that day. A number of explanations of who betrayed Van Meter to the police have been advanced since his death, including Baby Face Nelson, with whom he had quarreled, St. Paul Jewish-American organized crime leader Harry Sawyer and his German-American underling Jack Peifer, and local St. Paul bank robber Tommy Gannon.

According to a 1939 FBI interview of one Thomas Kirwin, a handyman who worked on Harry Sawyer's farm north of St. Paul, and who had harbored both Gannon and Van Meter there, Gannon betrayed Van Meter to the St. Paul police in collusion with Peifer and Sawyer, who split $10,000 or so of Homer Van Meter's money with Detective Brown, while Gannon was given Van Meter's guns. That same year, the FBI announced that it believed Sawyer had set up Van Meter to get at his money, splitting the take with the four ranking officers who did the shooting.

== Other media ==
=== In film ===
- In the 1957 movie Guns Don't Argue, Van Meter is played by Richard Crane (actor). This movie is about the capture of Van Meter, John Dillinger & The Barker–Karpis Gang
- In John Milius' film Dillinger (1973), Homer Van Meter was portrayed by actor Harry Dean Stanton; incorrectly he is shown escaping from the Little Bohemia ambush and later being killed by small town vigilantes.
- In the television movie The Kansas City Massacre (1975), Van Meter was portrayed by actor Brion James.
- In the Michael Mann film Public Enemies (2009), Homer Van Meter is portrayed by actor Stephen Dorff. He is portrayed as being shot to death along with Baby Face Nelson by Melvin Purvis (Christian Bale) after a car chase from Little Bohemia, when in reality, Van Meter escaped unharmed with Dillinger, Tommy Carroll, and Hamilton. The film also portrays Van Meter as being one of the escapees in the September 26, 1933 breakout from Michigan City arranged by Dillinger, though in reality, he had made parole just after Dillinger.
- Actor Christopher Berry was cast to portray Homer Van Meter in an unreleased British film adaptation of Stephen King's "The Death of Jack Hamilton".

=== In radio and television ===
- Homer Van Meter was the subject of an episode of the Gang Busters radio show on April 15, 1936, which later became the 10th episode of the first season of the 1952 TV series of the same name. On the TV show, Van Meter was portrayed by actor Richard Crane.

=== In print ===
- The Stephen King short story "The Death of Jack Hamilton" (2001) is told from Van Meter's perspective and portrays an alternative history wherein he did not die in 1934 and lived long enough to recall John F. Kennedy's assassination.
