= Public enemy =

Person who endangers society as a whole

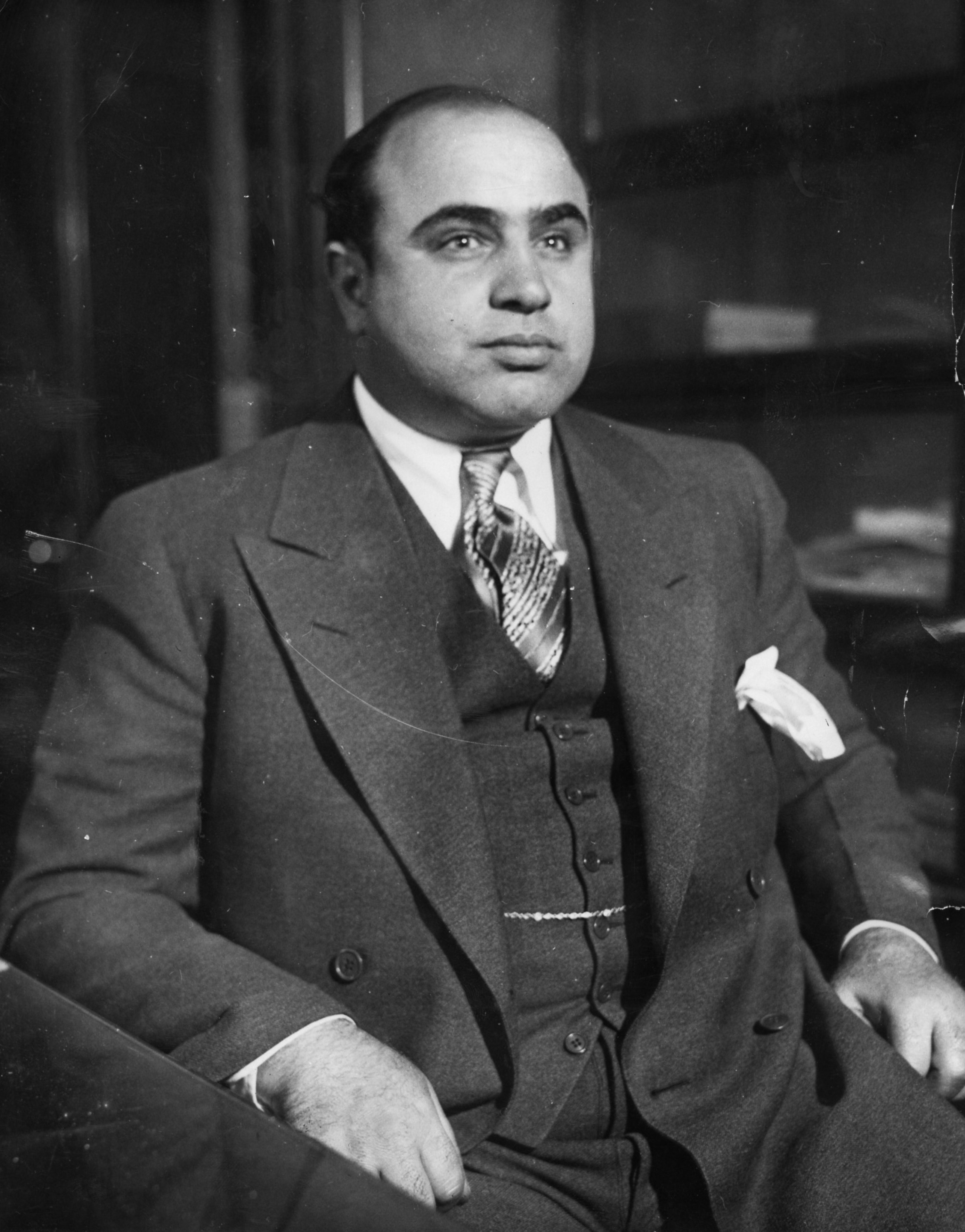
Al Capone in 1930

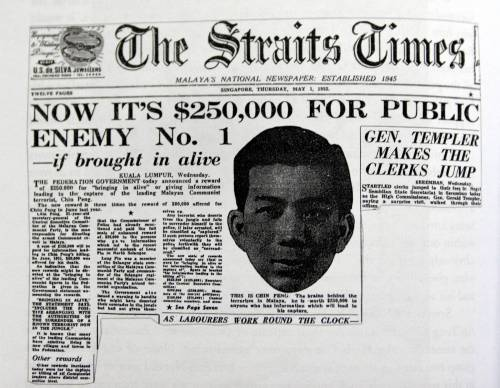
A S$250,000 monetary reward during the Malayan Emergency, offered for the capture of communist politician Chin Peng

"Public enemy" is a term to denounce a notorious criminal whose activities are seen as extremely damaging to society.

A notable declared public enemy was Al Capone in the 1930s.

== Origin and usage ==
The expression is a translation of the ancient Roman phrase hostis publicus; for example, the Senate denounced emperor Nero as a hostis publicus in AD 68.

The phrase is attested in the 17th century in the United Kingdom.

The phrase ennemi du peuple was extensively used during the French Revolution. On 25 December 1793, Robespierre stated: "The revolutionary government owes to the good citizen all the protection of the nation; it owes nothing to the Enemies of the People but death." The Law of 22 Prairial in 1794 extended the remit of the Revolutionary Tribunal to punish "enemies of the people", with some political crimes punishable by death, including "spreading false news to divide or trouble the people".

=== US Public Enemy era ===
The modern use of the term was first popularized in April 1930 by Frank J. Loesch, then chairman of the Chicago Crime Commission, to publicly denounce Al Capone and a list of other organized crime gangsters.

In 1933, Loesch recounted the origin and purpose of the list:

I had the operating director of the Chicago Crime Commission bring before me a list of the outstanding hoodlums, known murderers, murderers which you and I know but can't prove, and there were about one hundred of them, and out of this list I selected twenty-eight men. I put Al Capone at the head and his brother next, and ran down the twenty-eight, every man being really an outlaw. I called them Public Enemies, and so designated them in my letter, sent to the Chief of Police, the Sheriff [and] every law enforcing officer. The purpose is to keep the publicity light shining on Chicago's most prominent, well known and notorious gangsters to the end that they may be under constant observation by the law enforcing authorities and law-abiding citizens.

The phrase was later appropriated by J. Edgar Hoover and the FBI, who used it throughout the 1930s to describe various notorious fugitives. Unlike Loesch's list, the FBI's "Public Enemies" were wanted criminals already charged with crimes, including at various times John Dillinger, Baby Face Nelson, Bonnie and Clyde, Pretty Boy Floyd, Machine Gun Kelly, Ma Barker, and Alvin Karpis.

The term was used so extensively during the 1930s that some writers call that period of the FBI's early history the "Public Enemy Era". Dillinger, Floyd, Nelson, and Karpis were successively named "Public Enemy Number 1" from June 1934 to May 1936. The informal designation eventually evolved into the FBI Ten Most Wanted Fugitives list.

The FBI's website describes the bureau's use of the term: "The FBI and the U.S. Department of Justice made use of the term, 'Public Enemy', in the 1930s, an era in which the term was synonymous with 'fugitive' or 'notorious gangster'." It was used in speeches, books, press releases, and internal memoranda and remains in usage to this day.

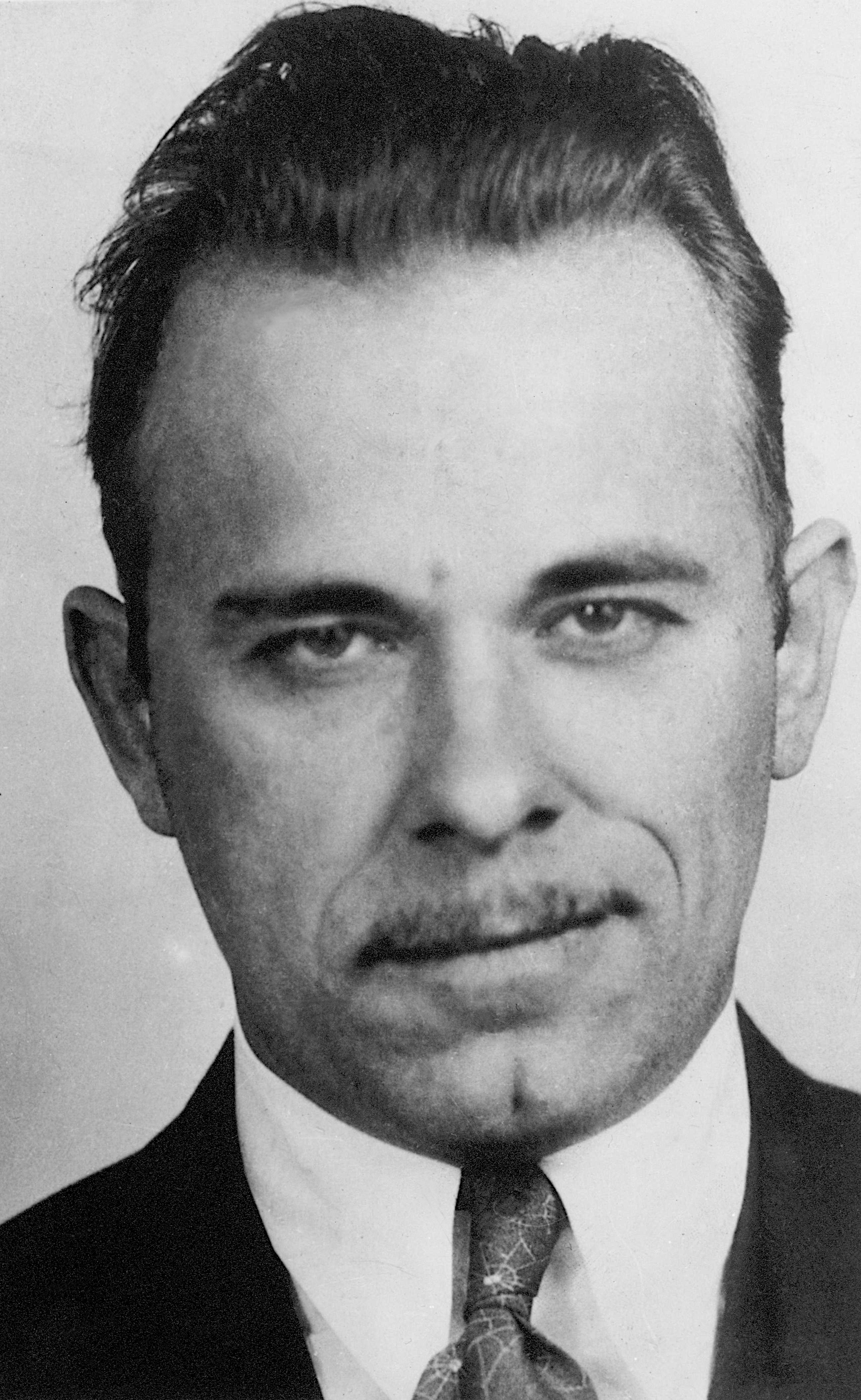
John Dillinger

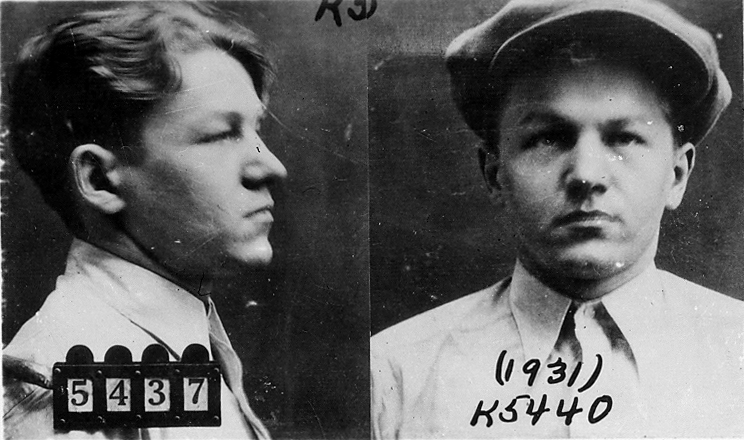
1931 Mugshot of Lester Gillis aka "George 'Baby Face' Nelson"

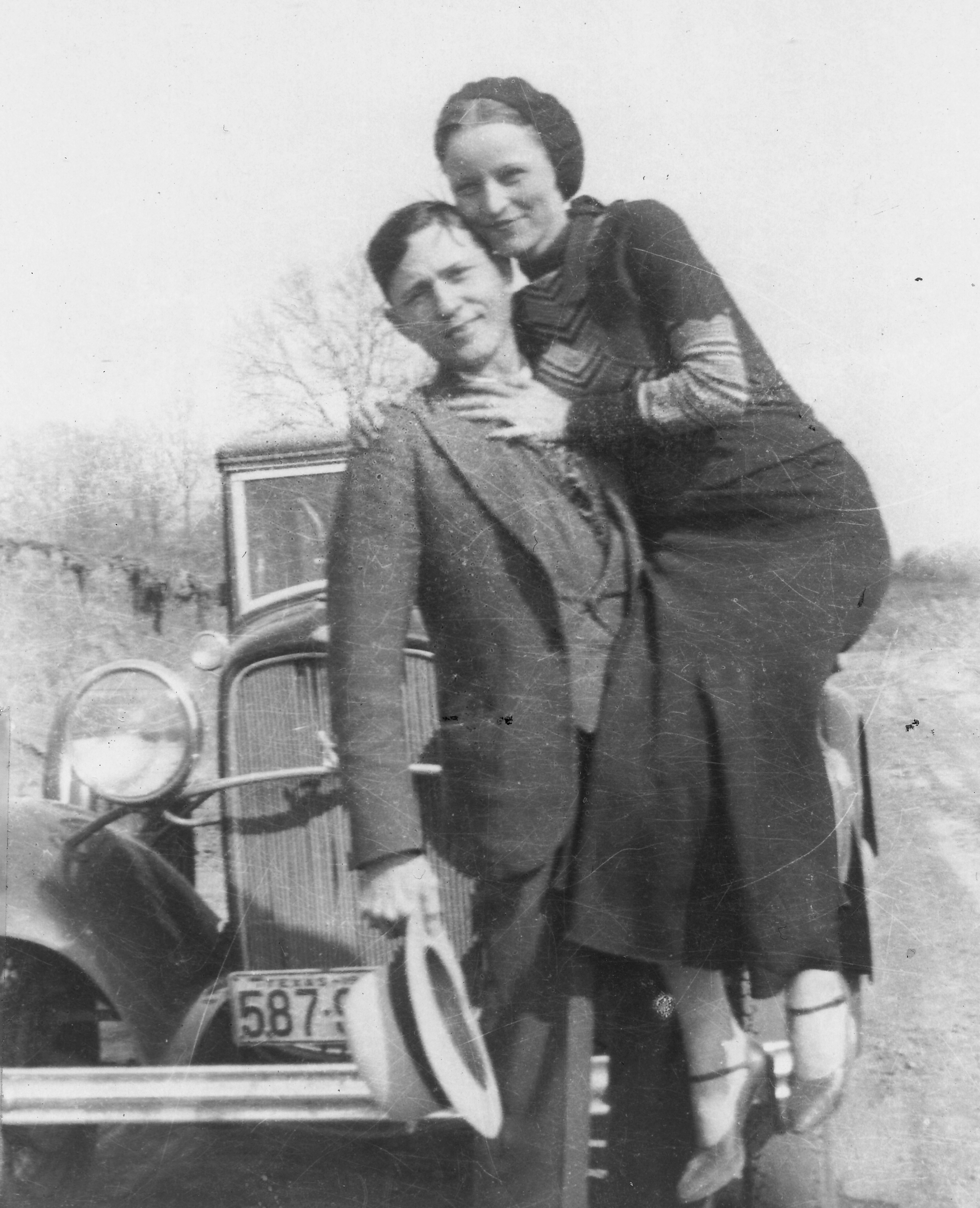
Clyde Barrow and Bonnie Parker

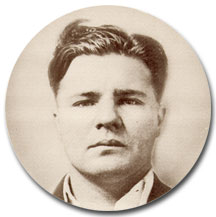
"Pretty Boy" Floyd

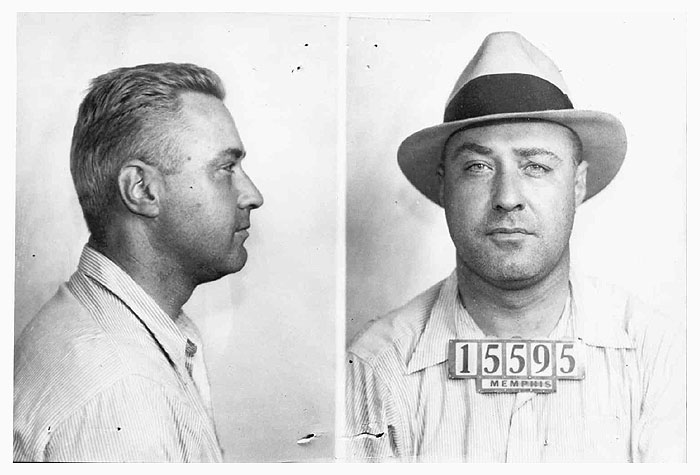
"Machine Gun" Kelly

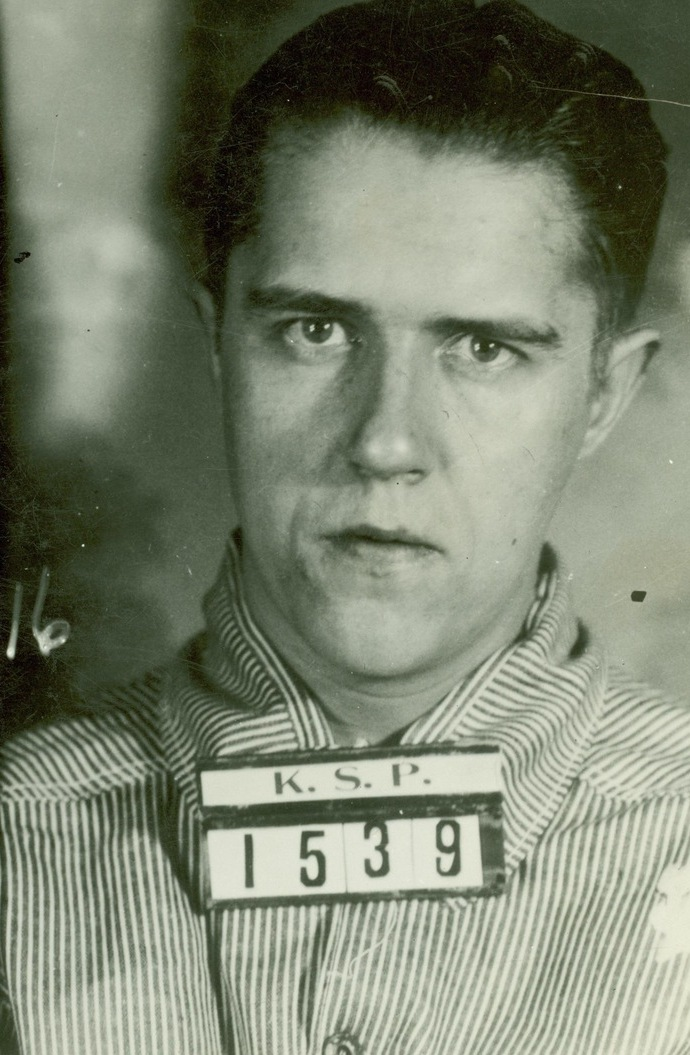
Alvin Karpis

== See also ==
- Enemy of the people
- List of the Great Depression-era outlaws
