= The Battle of Barrington =

1934 shootout in Lake County, Illinois

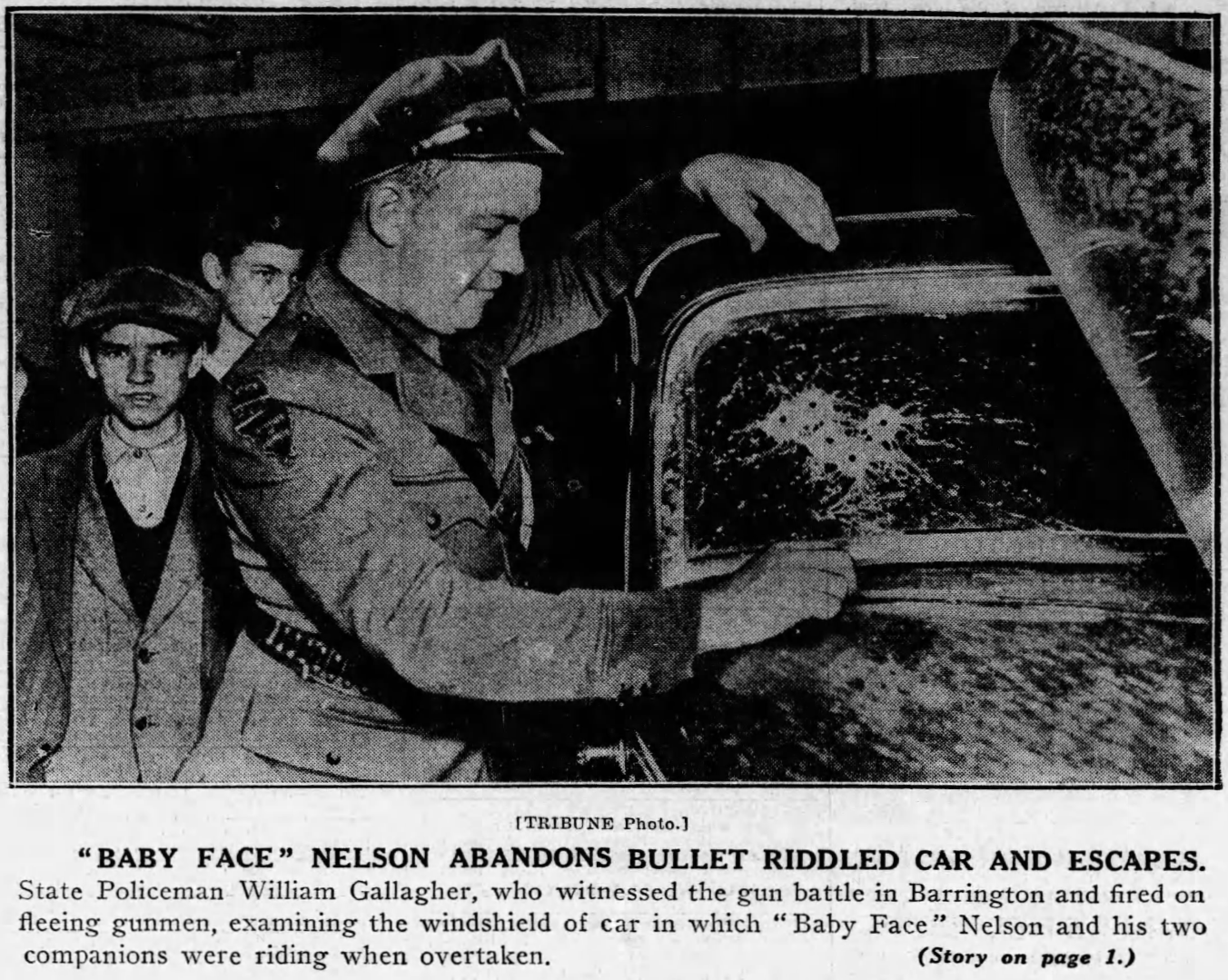
- "Baby Face" Nelson abandons bullet riddled car and escapes (Chicago Tribune, 28 November 1934)
- Location: 42°09′41.2″N 88°08′23.4″W; North Park and U.S. Route 12; Barrington, Illinois, United States
- Date: November 27, 1934; 91 years ago 3:15 p.m. (CST)
- Attack type: Shootout
- Deaths: Samuel Cowley (FBI inspector); Herman Hollis (FBI special agent); Baby Face Nelson
- Assailants: Baby Face Nelson; Helen Gillis; John Paul Chase
- Convictions: • Helen Gillis (harboring a fugitive; sentenced to one year in prison) • John Paul Chase (murder on Inspector Cowley; sentenced to life in prison)

The Battle of Barrington was a shootout between Division of Investigation (DOI) agents and outlaws led by Baby Face Nelson that took place on November 27, 1934, in Barrington, a suburb of Chicago, Illinois. It resulted in the deaths of Nelson, Agent Herman "Ed" Hollis, and Agent/Inspector Samuel P. Cowley.

== Background ==
With the death of John Dillinger in July 1934, the Federal Bureau of Investigation, then known as the Division of Investigation, focused on eliminating what remained of the Dillinger Gang. Lester "Baby Face Nelson" Gillis, whom newspapers of the era dubbed "Dillinger's aid", had managed to elude the federal dragnet. By late November 1934, Nelson had fled north to hide out in Lake Geneva, Wisconsin with his wife Helen and his associate John Paul Chase, but the DOI had begun conducting stakeouts of the area.

== Shootout ==
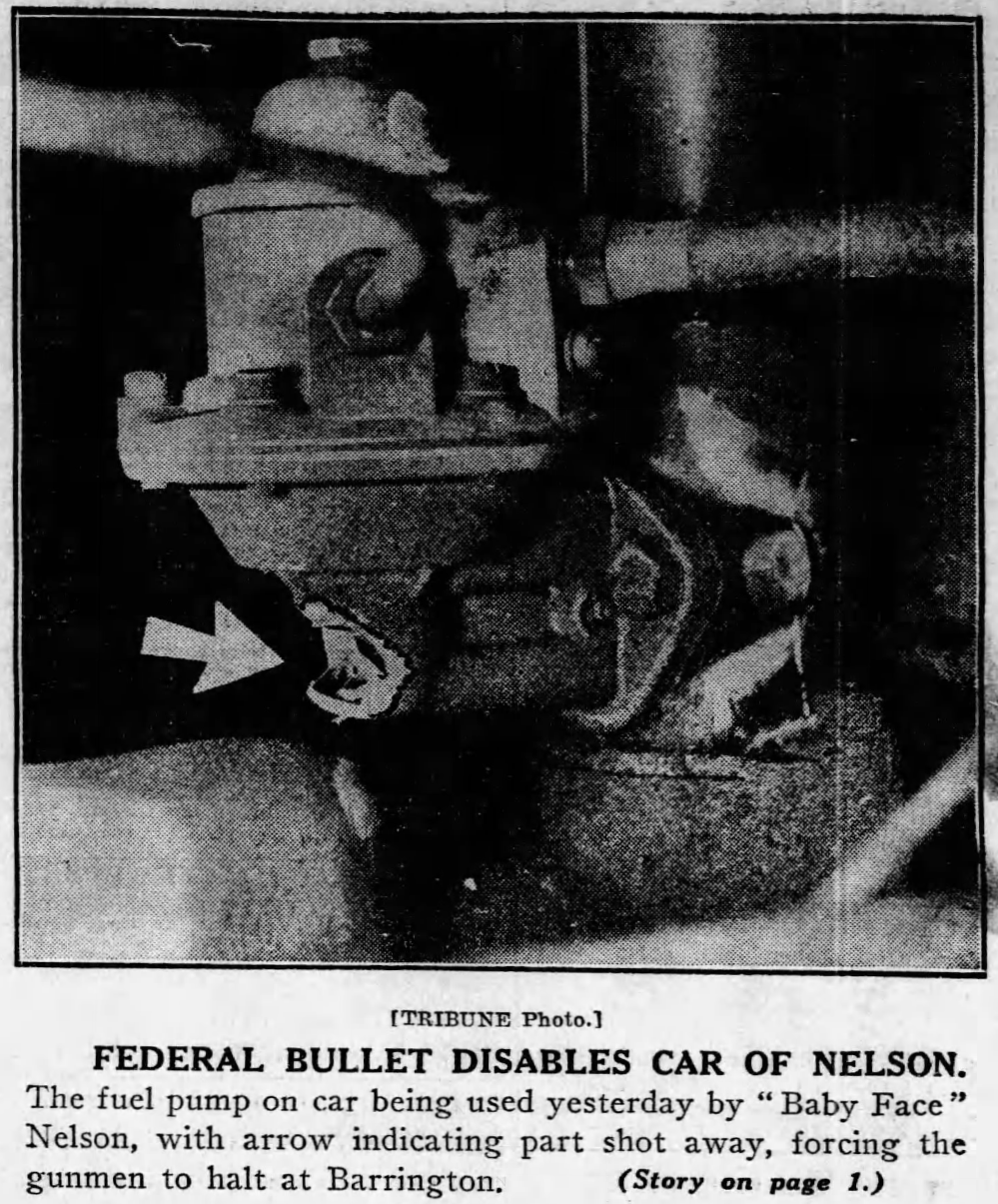
Federal bullet disables car of Nelson (Chicago Tribune, 28 November 1934)

On the afternoon of November 27, Nelson, Helen, and Chase departed Lake Geneva and traveled south toward Chicago on U.S. Route 12 (now U.S. Route 14). Nelson had spotted a group of federal agents staking out Lake Geneva's Lake Como Inn, the outlaws' anticipated hideout. Unbeknownst to them, the agents had called for assistance, which was en route to Lake Geneva, taking the same route.

While driving near the village of Fox River Grove, Illinois, Nelson noticed a vehicle traveling in the opposite direction driven by DOI Agents Thomas M. McDade and William C. "Bill" Ryan, Sr. (September 10, 1904 – January 25, 1967), who were traveling to Lake Geneva from the DOI's Chicago field office to support the agents there. Nelson and the agents recognized each other simultaneously, and after several U-turns by both cars, Nelson wound up in pursuit of the agents, who were driving a sedan that was less powerful than Nelson's 1934 Ford. When Nelson's Ford came close, Chase opened fire on the agents' vehicle. The agents returned fire before being run off the road; neither were injured, but the pair, expecting Nelson and Chase to return, took up defensive positions. Unbeknownst to them, Ryan had fired a round that punctured the water pump and radiator of Nelson's Ford, causing it to lose power. At this point, Agents Herman Hollis and Samuel P. Cowley, responding to assist the agents, began pursuing Nelson's Ford in their more powerful Hudson.

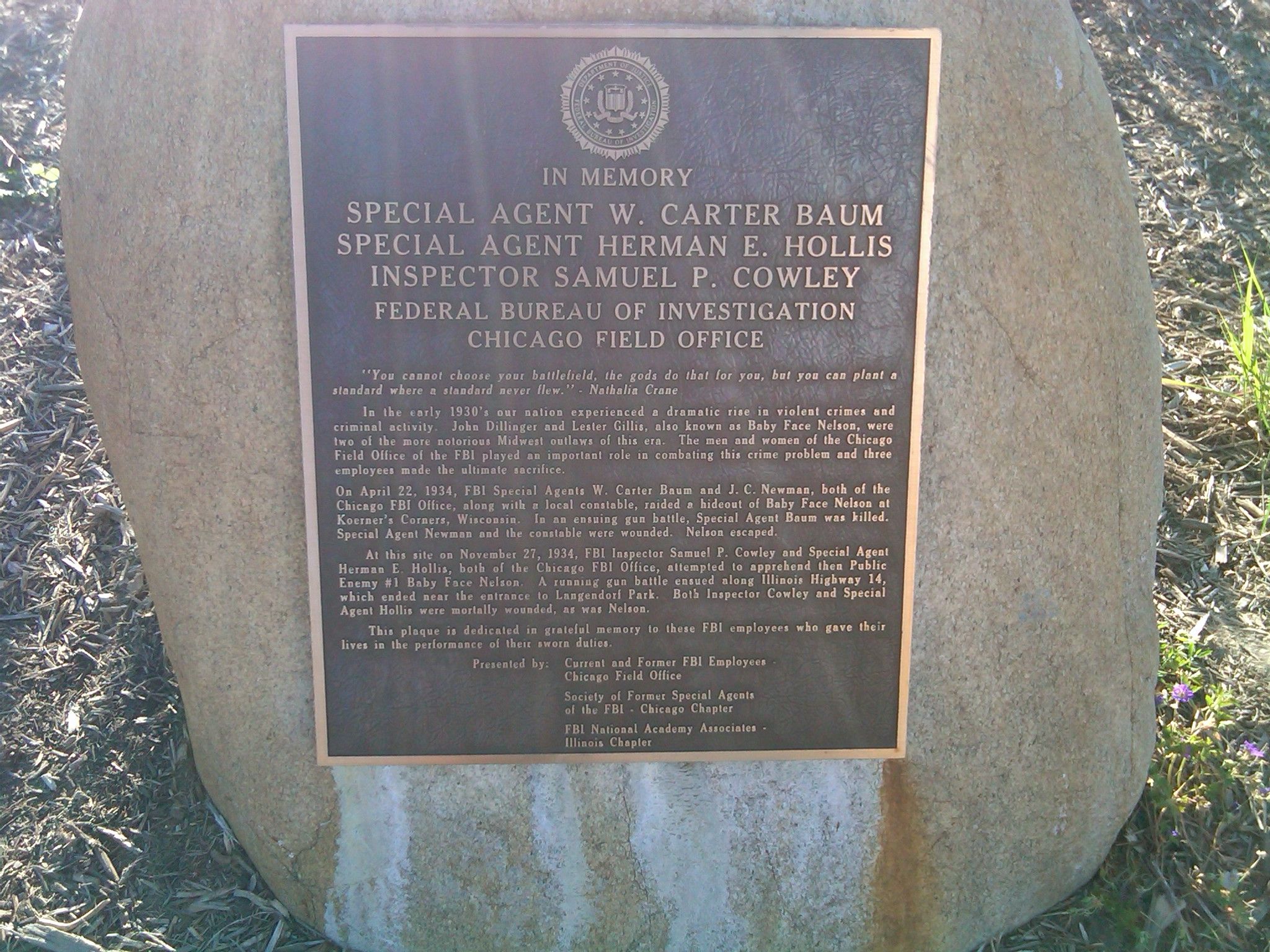
A plaque at the Barrington Park District commemorating the site of the Battle of Barrington

Video clips of Depression era gangsters, including Pretty Boy Floyd, Baby Face Nelson, Machine Gun Kelly, and Arthur Barker

With Hollis and Cowley attempting to pull alongside, Nelson stopped his Ford at the entrance of North Park (now Langendorf Park) in Barrington, several miles from Fox River Grove. Hollis and Cowley overshot Nelson's Ford by about 100 feet (30 m), forcing them to stop at an angle, where they took defensive positions behind their Hudson. As Helen fled to take cover in a field, Hollis and Cowley, armed with a shotgun and a Thompson submachine gun respectively, opened fire on Nelson and Chase, who returned fire.

As Nelson and Chase fired on the agents, Cowley managed to shoot Nelson in the abdomen. After Nelson switched his jammed machine-gun for another, he stepped into the line of fire and advanced toward Cowley and Hollis, shooting Cowley with a burst while he was taking cover in a ditch. Hollis, who may have already been wounded, fired his shotgun at Nelson, striking him in the legs with eight pellets, before retreating to take cover behind a utility pole. With his shotgun empty, Hollis drew his service pistol and prepared to open fire, only to be shot in the head by Nelson at close range.

With both agents incapacitated, Nelson drove the agents' Hudson to his disabled Ford, where Chase helped him transfer their stockpile of weapons and ammunition to the Hudson. As they prepared to flee, Nelson, who was grievously wounded by the agents' fire, collapsed into the Hudson. Chase and Helen proceeded to enter the Hudson and drove away with Nelson.

== Aftermath ==
Nelson had been shot a total of nine times; Cowley's shot to his abdomen would ultimately prove fatal. After telling his wife "I'm done for", Nelson directed Chase to drive them to a safe house on Walnut Street in Wilmette. Nelson died in bed there, with his wife at his side, at 7:35 pm that evening. Following an anonymous telephone tip, Nelson's body was discovered wrapped in a Native American patterned blanket in front of St. Paul's Lutheran Cemetery in Skokie. Helen later stated that she had placed the blanket around Nelson's body because "He always hated being cold."

Hollis's severe head wound quickly proved fatal, and he was declared dead soon after arriving at a hospital. At a different hospital, Cowley survived enough to confer briefly with Melvin Purvis, telling him, "Nothing would bring [Nelson] down." He underwent unsuccessful surgery before succumbing to a stomach wound similar to Nelson's.

Newspapers reported, based on the questionable wording of an order from J. Edgar Hoover ("...find the woman and give her no quarter"), that the Bureau of Investigation had issued a "death order" for Helen. She wandered the streets of Chicago as a fugitive for several days, described in print as America's first female "public enemy". After surrendering on Thanksgiving, Helen, who had been paroled after her capture at Little Bohemia Lodge, served a year in prison for harboring her late husband and died in 1987. Chase was apprehended later and served a term at Alcatraz and died in 1973.

On 25 October 2024, the last known surviving witness, Bill Eiserman, died at age 96. He was just 6 years old at the time.
