= Charles B. Winstead =

Agent of the US Federal Bureau of Investigation

- Born: May 25, 1891; Sherman, Texas, US
- Died: August 3, 1973 (aged 82); Albuquerque, New Mexico, US
- Occupation: FBI agent
- Employer: FBI
- Known for: Shooting John Dillinger
- Title: Special agent

Charles Batsell "Charlie" Winstead (May 25, 1891 – August 3, 1973) was an FBI agent in the 1930s–40s, famous for being one of the agents (along with Clarence Hurt and Herman "Ed" Hollis) who shot and killed John Dillinger on July 22, 1934, in Chicago, Illinois.

== Biography ==
=== Early life ===
Charlie Winstead was born in Sherman, Texas on May 25, 1891. Before joining the FBI he engaged in various occupations, including decorated service with the US Army in World War I, working as a deputy sheriff in several Texas jurisdictions, and just before joining the Bureau, as a law clerk in the US Attorney's office in El Paso, Texas.

He joined the Bureau in July 1926.

As a member of the Dallas Field Office, Winstead took part in several unsuccessful manhunts targeting outlaws Bonnie Parker and Clyde Barrow, and played a key role in the manhunt for kidnapper George "Machine Gun" Kelly; along with Agent Gus Jones, Winstead arrested Kelly's associate Harvey Bailey in Rhome, Oklahoma, which set the FBI manhunt for Kelly in motion.

=== John Dillinger ===
In May 1934, Winstead and several other Western agents, including former Oklahoma City policemen Jerry Campbell and Clarence Hurt, were assigned to the Chicago Field Office to help apprehend John Dillinger and his gang of bank robbers. After the Little Bohemia fiasco in April, in which agents led by Melvin Purvis and Sam Cowley had killed a civilian and lost an agent in a failed ambush of Dillinger's gang, FBI Director J. Edgar Hoover brought in the experienced Texans to augment Purvis's still-relatively inexperienced agents.

Winstead is widely believed to have been the agent who fired the fatal shot into Dillinger during the FBI's ambush at the Biograph Theater, shooting him in the back of the head at close range. For this, he received a personal letter of commendation from Hoover.

After Dillinger's death, Winstead helped track down the new "Public Enemy Number One", Baby Face Nelson, narrowly missing a confrontation with Nelson when he and Nelson drove past each other on a Highway 14 in Barrington, Illinois on November 27, 1934. Winstead's encounter with the outlaw ultimately led to the Battle of Barrington.

=== Later career ===
Winstead returned west after Nelson's death, serving at the El Paso and Albuquerque offices. While in El Paso he took under his wing a rookie special agent named William C. Sullivan, mentoring him and helping to launch a career that would ultimately make him one of the top figures at FBI headquarters in Washington, DC.

Sullivan later characterized Winstead as a man with a "naturally probing mind" which could readily "absorb, retain, and use information." Although his formal education was minimal, the college-educated Sullivan remembered Winstead as "so well read that he stood out in sharp contrast to most men with college and graduate degrees, those who stopped learning when they left school."

In an organization which demanded blind obedience to its iron-fisted leader, Winstead was privately dismissive of FBI Director J. Edgar Hoover, confidentially telling William Sullivan never to initiate a meeting with him for any reason, since the mercurial Hoover was known to end careers on the slightest pretext. He told Sullivan:

"If Hoover ever calls you in, dress like a dandy, carry a notebook, and write in it furiously every time Hoover opens his mouth. You can throw the notes away afterward if you like. And flatter him. Everyone at headquarters knows Hoover is an egomaniac, and they all flatter him constantly. If you don't, you'll be noticed."

Shortly thereafter in 1942 Winstead himself came under the spotlight's glare, earning Hoover's stern disapprobation for having insulted a female reporter and accused her of Communist sympathies.

Hoover demanded an apology and as punishment ordered Winstead's transfer to the Oklahoma City field office. Winstead instead refused this forced relocation, telling Hoover to "go to hell" and resigning on December 10, 1942 — four years short of having accrued sufficient tenure for government retirement.

According to Winstead, who told the story in a December 15, 1942 letter to Sullivan, he had made "perfectly proper statements...in a private conversation" in which he had "contradicted [the reporter's] statement that 'Russia is fighting our battles'" in the World War. Winstead's comment had been passed along to J. Edgar Hoover by the reporter, Winstead wrote, prompting an overreaction which "shocked" him. "I knew better than anybody that after doing my little bit from 1917 to 1920 to save the world for Democracy, and so many of the boys doing it again now, that I wasn't going so far as Oklahoma City as a penalty for exercising my rights of free speech," Winstead declared.

=== Life after the FBI ===
After resigning from the FBI, he served as an Army intelligence and security officer in the later years of World War II. For a time, he was in charge of security at Los Alamos during the Manhattan Project, when the first atomic bomb was being constructed by the US Army.

Winstead returned to law enforcement after the war, serving various part-time jobs as a sheriff's deputy in New Mexico and a private investigator, before retiring and taking up horse ranching.

In the 1950s, he began work on a memoir of his years with the FBI, but never finished; the manuscript was discovered in 2008 and is now kept in a museum in Sherman.

=== Death and legacy ===
Winstead died on August 3, 1973, in the Albuquerque Veteran's Hospital of cancer. He was 82 years old at the time of his death. In his will Winstead left his .357 Magnum sidearm, Stetson hat, boots, saddles, and rope to William C. Sullivan — his former protégé who had risen through FBI ranks before himself coming to career grief at the hands of imperious FBI boss J. Edgar Hoover.

Winstead was portrayed by actor Stephen Lang in Michael Mann's film Public Enemies (2009).
