= Dillinger (1973 film) =

1973 film by John Milius

- Theatrical release poster
- Directed by: John Milius
- Written by: John Milius
- Produced by: Buzz Feitshans
- Starring: Warren Oates; Ben Johnson; Cloris Leachman; Michelle Phillips; Harry Dean Stanton; John Ryan; Richard Dreyfuss
- Cinematography: Jules Brenner
- Edited by: Fred R. Feitshans Jr.
- Music by: Barry De Vorzon
- Production company: American International Pictures
- Distributed by: American International Pictures
- Release dates: June 19, 1973 (Dallas, Texas); July 18, 1973 (Los Angeles, California)
- Running time: 107 minutes
- Country: United States
- Language: English
- Budget: $1 million
- Box office: $2 million (US and Canada rentals)

Dillinger is a 1973 American biographical gangster film written and directed by John Milius in his directorial debut, and starring Warren Oates, Ben Johnson, and Michelle Phillips, with supporting performances from Cloris Leachman, Harry Dean Stanton, and Richard Dreyfuss. The film is a dramatization of the life and criminal exploits of notorious bank robber John Dillinger (Oates).

Retired FBI Agent Clarence Hurt, one of the agents involved in the final shootout with Dillinger, was the film's technical advisor. The film includes documentary imagery and film footage from the era. It includes a verbal renouncing of gangster films written by FBI chief J. Edgar Hoover: he was scheduled to read it for the film, but died before it started production. Hoover's text is read at the film's close by voice actor Paul Frees.

The film was released by American International Pictures on June 19, 1973. It was well-received by critics and was a commercial success. It was followed by two made-for-TV spin-offs: Melvin Purvis: G-Man (1974) (teleplay written by Milius) and The Kansas City Massacre (1975), both directed by Dan Curtis and each starring Dale Robertson as Purvis.

== Plot ==
During the Great Depression, various bank robbers and other outlaws have become folk heroes due to public distrust of financial institutions and the law. Following the Kansas City Massacre in June 1933 in which several law enforcement offers were killed brazenly in broad daylight, FBI field office chief Melvin Purvis decides to personally hunt down the men he deems responsible: Charles Arthur "Pretty Boy" Floyd, Lester "Baby Face" Nelson, George "Machine Gun" Kelly, "Handsome" Jack Klutas, Wilbur "Mad Dog" Underhill and John Dillinger. During a meeting with fellow FBI agent Samuel Cowley, Purvis makes it clear that he seeks personal vengeance and that he's willing to use extralegal measures if necessary.

Dillinger is in the midst of his criminal career, accompanied by Homer Van Meter, Harry Pierpont, Charles Mackley, and others, and is very boastful about his exploits. He meets Billie Frechette at a bar and immediately takes a liking to her, but becomes nonplussed when she doesn't recognize him and robs the bar patrons to impress her. She becomes his lover, accompanying him and his gang on their exploits. During one robbery in East Chicago, the gang loses Mackley and several others, forcing the gang to scatter.

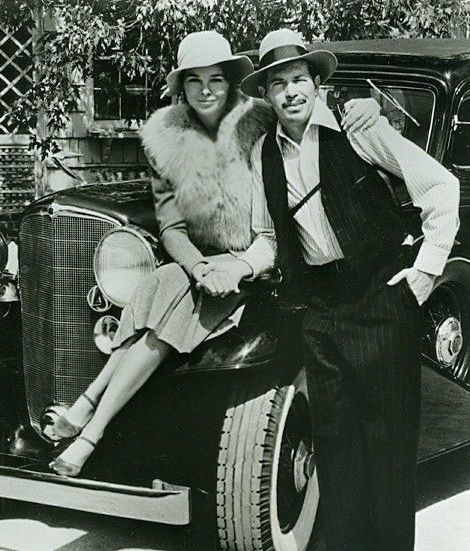
Michelle Phillips and Warren Oates as Billie Frechette and John Dillinger, respectively

It is during this time that Purvis has begun his purge of the gangsters, hunting down and killing Underhill and Klutas and capturing Kelly. He's unable to move against Dillinger and the others as they have not violated federal laws yet. While lying low in Arizona with the rest of the gang, Dillinger is captured by the local authorities and transported to Crown Point, Indiana. While imprisoned there, Dillinger makes a daring escape after carving a bar of soap into the shape of a gun and fooling the guards into releasing him. It is during this escape that Dillinger finally commits a federal crime, driving a stolen car across state lines.

He takes a fellow prisoner Reed Youngblood with him, and they eventually meet back up with the gang, including new members Nelson and Floyd. They start a crime spree across the Midwest to the chagrin of Purvis, angry and jealous of how the media romanticizes their exploits. The gang's luck runs out following a bank robbery in Mason City, Iowa, which leads to a violent shootout ending in Youngblood's death and the wounding of another member. While staying at the Little Bohemia lodge in Wisconsin following the heist, Purvis leads a team of FBI agents on a raid of the lodge, costing numerous agents' lives and sending the gang scattering again. During this chaos, Pierpont, Nelson, Van Meter, and Floyd are all hunted down by either federal agents or local vigilantes and summarily killed.

While hiding in Chicago, Dillinger makes the acquaintance of a brothel owner, Anna Sage. Purvis, sensing an opportunity, offers to protect Sage from being deported if she'll help finger Dillinger. While attending the gangster film Manhattan Melodrama at the Biograph Theater, Purvis and his men get into position to capture Dillinger as he, Sage the "Woman in Red", and a female acquaintance exit the theater. At the last minute, Purvis instead goads Dillinger into going for his gun and then shoots the gangster down in the alleyway.

In the epilogue, it is revealed that Sage was eventually deported back to Romania despite Purvis' promise, Purvis eventually committed suicide after retiring from the FBI, Frechette ended up dying penniless, and Dillinger's likeness is now used for the FBI's targets during shooting practice.

=== J. Edgar Hoover's postscript, voiced by Paul Frees ===
Dillinger was in production in early 1972, more than a year before its Dallas premiere on June 19, 1973. J. Edgar Hoover, who died on May 2, 1972, wrote a denunciation of the film's glamorization of gangsters. Hoover's message is delivered by voice actor Paul Frees after the end credits have stopped rolling:

"Dillinger was a rat that the country may consider itself fortunate to be rid of, and I don't sanction any Hollywood glamorization of these vermin. This type of romantic mendacity can only lead young people further astray than they are already, and I want no part of it."

== Cast ==
- Warren Oates as John Dillinger
- Ben Johnson as FBI Agent Melvin Purvis
- Michelle Phillips as Billie Frechette
- Cloris Leachman as Anna Sage
- Harry Dean Stanton as Homer Van Meter
- Geoffrey Lewis as Harry Pierpont
- John Ryan as Charles Mackley
- Richard Dreyfuss as George "Baby Face" Nelson
- Steve Kanaly as Charles "Pretty Boy" Floyd
- John Martino as Eddie Martin
- Roy Jenson as FBI Agent Samuel Cowley
- Read Morgan as Sheriff Jim "Big Jim" Wollard
- Frank McRae as Reed Youngblood
- Terry Leonard as Jack Klutas
- Jerry Summers as Tommy Carroll
- Bob Harris as Ed Fulton
- George Oscar Heath as John Dillinger Sr.

== Historical accuracy ==
- In the beginning of the film, Melvin Purvis mentions that "five of his finest men" were shot in the Kansas City Massacre. In actuality, two Kansas City law enforcement officers, police chief Otto Reed, special agent Raymond J. Caffrey, and fugitive Frank Nash, were killed, not five law enforcement officers.
- Theodore "Handsome Jack" Klutas is shown being killed by Melvin Purvis; in fact, Klutas of the College Kidnappers was killed by Chicago Police on January 6, 1934.
- Wilbur Underhill is shown being shot and killed by Melvin Purvis; in fact, Underhill died on January 6, 1934, of wounds inflicted more than a week previously by an inter-jurisdictional group of law officers led by FBI Agents T.H. Colvin and Frank Smith, a survivor of the Kansas City Massacre. Purvis had nothing to do with the apprehension.
- In this film and a related John Milius film Melvin Purvis: G-Man, George "Machine Gun" Kelly is shown being hunted down and captured by Purvis on September 26, 1933; in fact, Kelly was captured by the Memphis, Tennessee Police and the Birmingham, Alabama Office of the FBI. (Also Kelly's alleged quote "Don't Shoot, G-Men" is a myth.) The film's newsreel footage of Dillinger being transported from Arizona is that of Kelly being extradited.
- In the film, a Chicago bank guard named O'Malley is killed by the Dillinger gang during a robbery attempt plus 2 policeman also died. William Patrick O'Malley was a member of the East Chicago Police force killed on January 15, 1934. Likewise, Dillinger gang member Eddie Green is shown being killed in the getaway; in fact, Green was killed in April 1934.
- Dillinger gang member Herbert Youngblood is shown being killed during a bank robbery by the Dillinger gang in Mason City, Iowa. In reality, Youngblood had been killed alone in a gunfight with police in March 1934. Likewise about half a dozen police and possemen are shown being killed; in fact only 2 members of the Dillinger gang were wounded as were two bystanders
- The Little Bohemia Lodge shootout was filmed at the Chickasaw Country Club near Ardmore, Oklahoma. The film implies that about four of the Dillinger gang are killed and half a score of federal agents were casualties. The first three men shot in the raid were two Civilian Conservation Corps workers and a resident shot by the FBI by mistake (one killed and two wounded), while one FBI agent was killed, one FBI agent was wounded, and one constable was critically wounded.
- Homer Van Meter is shown escaping from Little Bohemia and then being killed by vigilantes in Iowa, which was filmed in Dougherty, Oklahoma in the foothills of the Arbuckle Mountains. He was killed in St. Paul, Minnesota. Dillinger gang member Tommy Carroll was mortally wounded during a shootout with police in Waterloo, Iowa on June 7, 1934.
- Charles Makley is shown dying of a wound and being buried by Dillinger; in fact, Makley was killed on September 22, 1934 while trying to escape from prison. Dillinger gang member John Hamilton did die of wounds, and his remains were later found in a grave.
- Pretty Boy Floyd is shown greeting Dillinger at a picnic and then after the Little Bohemia shootout being shot by about a dozen FBI agents; in fact, there were only about four FBI agents present. Likewise, he was killed on October 22, 1934; gang member Baby Face Nelson was killed on November 27, 1934; both died after Dillinger was killed on July 22, 1934. There is also doubt that the two men, each designated "Public Enemy No 1", ever met in real life.
- The Dillinger film was inspired by the classic Bonnie and Clyde film; the real Barrow gang used BARs not Thompson submachine guns. The Dillinger gang used Thompson submachine guns instead of BARs.

== Production ==
=== Development ===
In the early 1970s, John Milius was one of the most sought-after screenwriters in Hollywood, selling his scripts for Jeremiah Johnson and The Life and Times of Judge Roy Bean for record sums. He was unhappy with the way both films turned out and wanted to direct. He approached Samuel Z. Arkoff of AIP with the offer of writing a script "for a fraction of his usual price" if he could direct.

Milius says AIP gave him three choices – Blacula, Black Mama, White Mama or "a gangster thing with Pretty Boy Floyd or Dillinger. I looked at the gangsters of the early thirties and the one that had the most appeal was Dillinger. It was a subject I never would have chosen myself but it allowed me to show how good I could do a gunfight. It was a showcase to show everyone I could make it cut together, make the story hold and make the actors act".

The project was announced in April 1972. "My father always predicted I would wind up in San Quentin by the age of 21", said Milius. "I wouldn't want to disappoint him too much. So here I am... directing a film about John Dillinger, the greatest criminal that ever lived." Milius says he wanted to make a movie about Dillinger because "of all the outlaws, he was the most marvelous". He elaborated,

People admired and respected Dillinger for being the greatest criminal. They admired him because he could get away with it. Because he did it well and he did it with style. And also because he enjoyed his work. I've made a myth out of him but not a romantic myth like Bonnie and Clyde. Dillinger is a tough guy he's a Cagney. I'm not at all concerned with showing his early life or explaining how he got that way. What I'm interested in is the legend. That's what this movie is, that's exactly what it is. It's not a character study or a Freudian analysis; it's an American folk tale.

=== Casting ===
Milius cast Warren Oates in the lead. Milius had wanted Oates to play the lead role in The Life and Times of Judge Roy Bean. "I write all my things for Warren Oates or young John Wayne types", he said. "Or sometimes Clint Eastwood. He looks good holding a gun. But to me, John Wayne is the ultimate American hero. Not because he's big and tough but because he's sentimental. My pictures are sentimental and idealistic. I deal with values of friendliness and courtliness and the family and chivalry and honor and courage – not just guts but bigger than life courage. Nobody today writes movies in the style that I do. Nobody. I write characters that are strong and direct, super individuals. The people in my movies fear no one but God."

Michelle Phillips, singer in the musical group Mamas and the Papas, was cast as Billie Frechette, marking her screen acting debut. She claimed she got cast by pretending to be half Cherokee, like her character. Susan Tyrrell was originally considered for the role of Anna Sage, though the part ultimately went to Cloris Leachman.

=== Filming ===
Filming took place in late 1972 entirely in Oklahoma, in the cities of Enid, Jefferson, Oklahoma City, and Ardmore. Much use of local landmark buildings was used in the filming from Jet, Nash, Jefferson, Hunter, and Enid in northern Oklahoma, to Ardmore, Dougherty, the Chickasaw Lake Club which served as Dillinger's "Little Bohemia" Wisconsin hideout, and the old iron truss bridge near Mannsville in the south. Oklahoma City locals included the Skirvin Tower ballroom and the Midwest Theater downtown, filling in as the Biograph. The house at the end of the movie was filmed in Dougherty. "It's my first time as director and I think I did an excellent job because I had such a superb script", said Milius.

=== Period music ===
- As photographs of Depression-era's impoverished victims pass on the screen during opening credits, "We're in the Money" (from Golddiggers of 1933) is heard on the soundtrack.
- The 1917 tango, "La Cumparsita", still popular in the 1930s, plays during a scene in a Chicago restaurant, followed by "Beyond the Blue Horizon" from the 1930 film Monte Carlo.
- "One More Chance", popularized by Bing Crosby in his 1931 short film of the same name, plays during a scene featuring Machine Gun Kelly.
- Another song made popular by Crosby, "It's Easy to Remember (And So Hard to Forget)", was written for his film Mississippi, released in 1935, one year after Dillinger's death. It is heard during an intimate bedroom scene with Dillinger and Billie Frechette.
- The 1929 song, Happy Days Are Here Again, featured in the Technicolor finale of the 1930 film, Chasing Rainbows, is prominently featured in the aftermath of Dillinger's capture.
- The melody "Honey", a 1929 hit for Rudy Vallée, is heard through the entire length of the closing credits.

== Release ==
Dillinger had its world premiere in Dallas, Texas on June 19, 1973. It opened in Los Angeles on July 18, 1973, and in New York City later that summer, on August 1, 1973.

=== Home media ===
Dillinger was released to DVD by MGM Home Entertainment on September 19, 2000, in a Region 1 widescreen DVD. It was later released by Arrow Video (under license from MGM) on April 26, 2016, as a Region 1 widescreen Blu-ray & DVD combination set.

== Reception ==
=== Box office ===
By 1976, Variety estimated the film had earned $4 million in rentals.

=== Critical reaction ===
On the review aggregator website Rotten Tomatoes, 93% of 15 critics' reviews are positive, with an average rating of 6.8/10. Metacritic, which uses a weighted average, assigned the film a score of 58 out of 100, based on 8 critics, indicating "mixed or average" reviews. Roger Ebert of the Chicago Sun-Times awarded three stars out of four and called it "the film, we may speculate, that John Milius was born to make: violent, tough, filled with guns and blood." He added, "Dillinger is played by Warren Oates, a gifted actor with an uncanny physical resemblance to the gangster. Oates is lean in speech and lanky in appearance, and toward the end of the film, he does a good job of getting jumpy."

A. H. Weiler of The New York Times wrote, "'Dillinger' does capture the look of the nineteen-thirties, but its violence dominates the scene and the players, who remain largely undefined figures on a bloody landscape." Gene Siskel of the Chicago Tribune gave the film two-and-a-half stars out of four and wrote that it "repeatedly copies the spirit, and a few scenes, of 'Bonnie and Clyde.' But it is distinguished by its acting. Director John Milius has cast fine second-tier actors who lend the familiar story great style."

Variety wrote, "Necessarily episodic, it loses somewhat in a lack of straight storyline, but there's sufficient fast action of the gangster type to satisfy this particular market." Kevin Thomas of the Los Angeles Times wrote, "The idea that the Depression could create folk heroes out of gangsters was expressed with such freshness and imagination in 'Bonnie and Clyde' that it seemed like a revelation. In 'Dillinger' (at selected theaters) writer John Milius, in his feature directorial debut, attempts to make the same point, but because it has already been made so powerfully it comes out like mere repetition." Gary Arnold of The Washington Post was negative, writing that "Milius doesn't have anything fresh to offer the period or the characters. As usual, he just feeds off certain influential movies, idolizes a strongman with a gun, and alternates predictable notes of facetiousness, viciousness, and 'poignance.'"

Milius later said in 2003:

I look at it today and I find it very crude, but I do find it immensely ambitious. We didn't have a lot of money or time, and we didn't have such things – we only had so many feet of track, stuff like that. So I couldn't do moving shots if they involved more than, what, six yards of track. We never had any kind of crane or anything. That's the way movies were made then.

== Novelization ==
Shortly before the release of the film, following the era's customary timing, Curtis Books published a novelization of the screenplay by Edward Fenton (1917–1995) using his tie-in pseudonym, "Henry Clement." Fenton was an award-winning author best known for his juvenile mysteries; books on Greek mythology, history, and culture; and English translations of the works of Greek children's author, Alki Zei.

== See also ==
- List of American films of 1973

== Sources ==
- Donahue, Suzanne Mary (1987). American Film Distribution: The Changing Marketplace. Ann Arbor, Michigan: UMI Research Press. ISBN 978-0-835-71776-2.
- Gallagher, John (1989). Film Directors on Directing. Westport, Connecticut: Greenwood Publishing. ISBN 978-0-313-39028-9.
- Segaloff, Nat (2006). Patrick McGilligan (ed.). Backstory 4 : Interviews with Screenwriters of the 1970s and 1980s. Berkeley, California: University of California Press. ISBN 978-0-520-24518-1.
