= Herman Hollis =

FBI agent (1903–1934)

Herman Edward Hollis
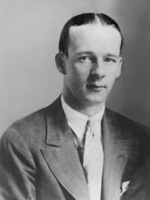
- FBI profile picture of Special Agent Hollis
- Born: January 27, 1903; Des Moines, Iowa
- Died: November 27, 1934 (aged 31); Barrington, Illinois
- Cause of death: Gunshot wounds
- Resting place: Glendale Cemetery, Des Moines, Iowa
- Other names: Ed Hollis, Eddie Hollis
- Education: Georgetown University Law School
- Occupation: Law-enforcement officer
- Employer: FBI
- Known for: Wounding gangster Baby Face Nelson at the Battle of Barrington; one of three FBI special agents who shot John Dillinger near the Biograph Theater in 1934
- Title: Special agent
- Spouse: Genevieve Hollis

Herman Edward Hollis (January 27, 1903 – November 27, 1934) was an American law-enforcement officer who worked as special agent for the Federal Bureau of Investigation. As an FBI special agent in the 1930s, Hollis worked with agents Melvin Purvis, Samuel P. Cowley and others fighting bank robbers, gangsters and organized crime in the Chicago area during the Great Depression. Hollis is best known for having been killed in the line of duty during an intense shootout with Chicago-area bank robber Lester Gillis, a.k.a. Baby Face Nelson, at the Battle of Barrington in 1934. Hollis was also one of the three FBI special agents who shot John Dillinger near the Biograph Theater earlier that year, resulting in Dillinger's death. One controversial account also implicates Hollis in the death of Pretty Boy Floyd. Hollis served as a special agent for the FBI's field offices in Kansas City, Cincinnati, and Chicago for over seven years; at the time of his death, he was 31 years old.

== Personal life ==
Hollis was born in Des Moines, Iowa, in January 1903 and received his law degree from the Georgetown University School of Law in Washington, D.C., in 1927. He was married and had one son.

== Career ==
Hollis began his service with the FBI almost immediately after finishing law school in August 1927. During his seven years with the Bureau, Hollis worked with the Kansas City, Cincinnati, and Chicago field offices. Rated as one of the FBI's top investigators, Hollis earned a sharp-shooter's medal for his work with the Thompson submachine gun. Over the years, Hollis repeatedly requested that the Bureau transfer him to a field office in California or Arizona; doctors insisted that a warmer climate would help improve his wife Genevieve's nervous condition.

=== John Dillinger shooting ===
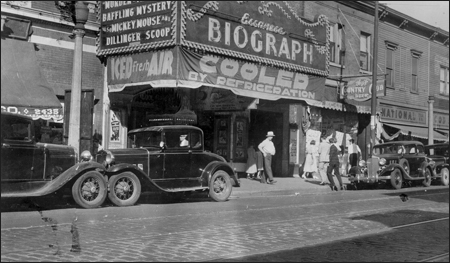
FBI photograph of the Biograph Theater in 1934 soon after Dillinger's death

On July 22, 1934, Hollis, Purvis and agents Charles B. Winstead and Clarence O. Hurt participated in a gun battle with the bank robber and gangster John Dillinger outside the Biograph Theater in Chicago, Illinois. As Dillinger came out of the building with two women, Agent Purvis signaled to the other agents, including Hollis. At least one account states that Purvis then approached Dillinger from behind and said, "OK, Johnnie, drop your gun." Dillinger fled toward a nearby alley and reached in his pocket for a pistol. Hollis, Winstead and Hurt then fired a total of four or five shots; either two or three hit Dillinger, who fell to the ground. According to one source, Winstead fired his .45 pistol three times, and both Hollis and Hurt fired once. Because of the simultaneous gunfire, it was unclear which agent was responsible for the shot that killed Dillinger, and the agents themselves did not say. FBI Director J. Edgar Hoover was pleased at the news of Dillinger's death and later recognized Hollis, Winstead, and Hurt for their "fearlessness and courageous action".

=== Pretty Boy Floyd shooting ===
Bank robber Pretty Boy Floyd was killed on October 22, 1934, after a shootout with FBI agents and local authorities in an apple orchard near East Liverpool, Ohio. In a 1979 Time magazine article, East Liverpool Police Captain Chester C. Smith claimed that Hollis killed Floyd under orders from FBI agent Melvin Purvis. According to Smith, after Smith had wounded Floyd, "Purvis turned to G-Man Herman Hollis and said: 'Fire into him.' Hollis obeyed, killing Floyd with a burst from a tommy gun" at close range. This version of events contradicts the official FBI account and is highly controversial since, in Smith's version, Floyd was already wounded and could have been taken into custody at the time Purvis ordered Hollis to fire. In a subsequent letter to Time's editors, FBI Special Agent Winfred E. Hopton claimed that he was one of the agents present when Floyd was apprehended, that he knew Hollis personally, and that Hollis was not present when Floyd was apprehended and could not have been responsible for Floyd's death. At least one other source discredits Smith's version, stating that although Smith's story received wide currency, Hollis was not at the orchard that afternoon. Hollis's FBI profile does not mention his participation in this incident.

=== Battle of Barrington and death ===
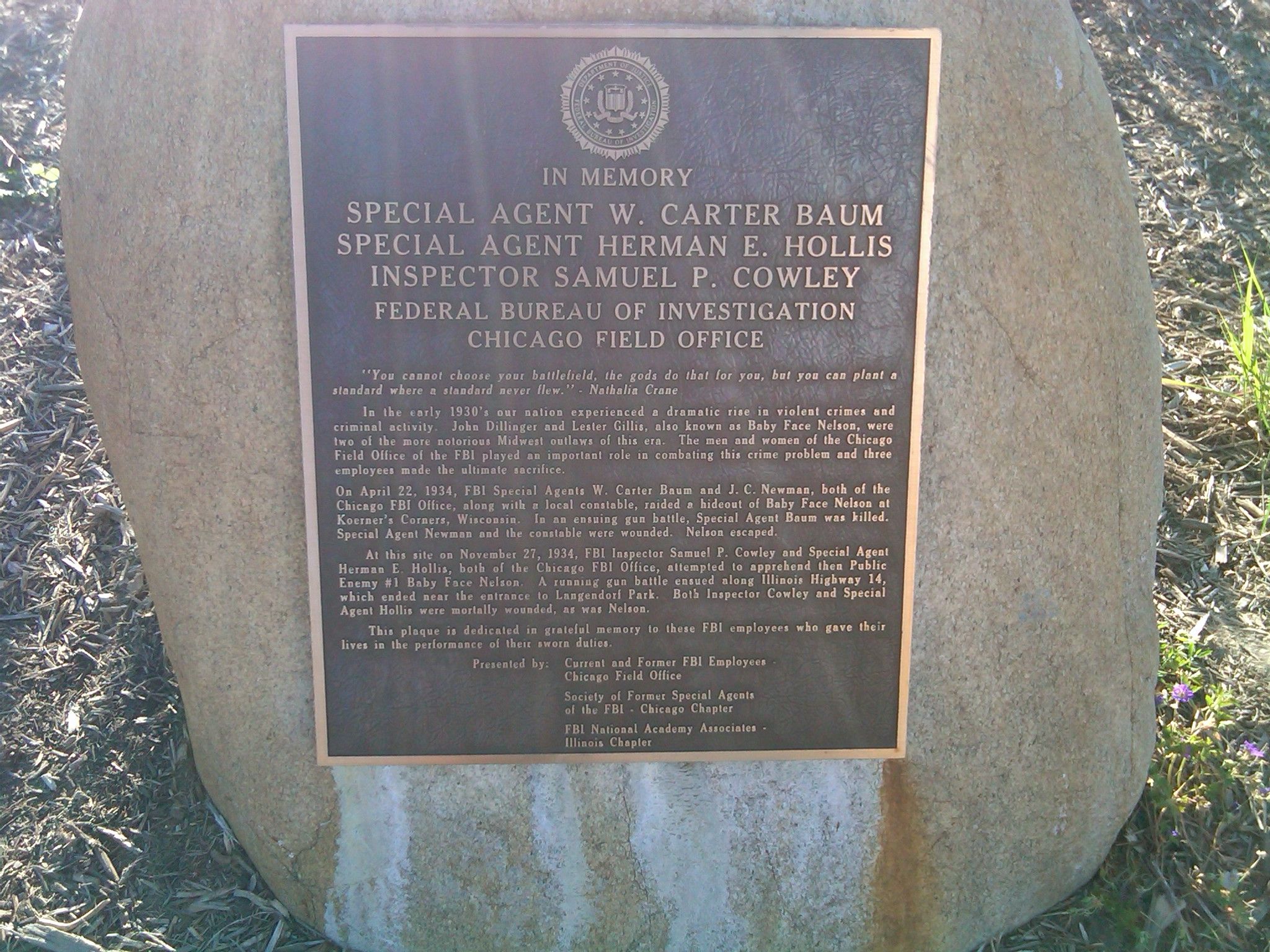
A plaque at Langendorf Park commemorates the site of the Battle of Barrington, a 1934 shootout that claimed the lives of FBI agents Hollis and Samuel P. Cowley and resulted in the death of notorious Chicago gangster Baby Face Nelson.

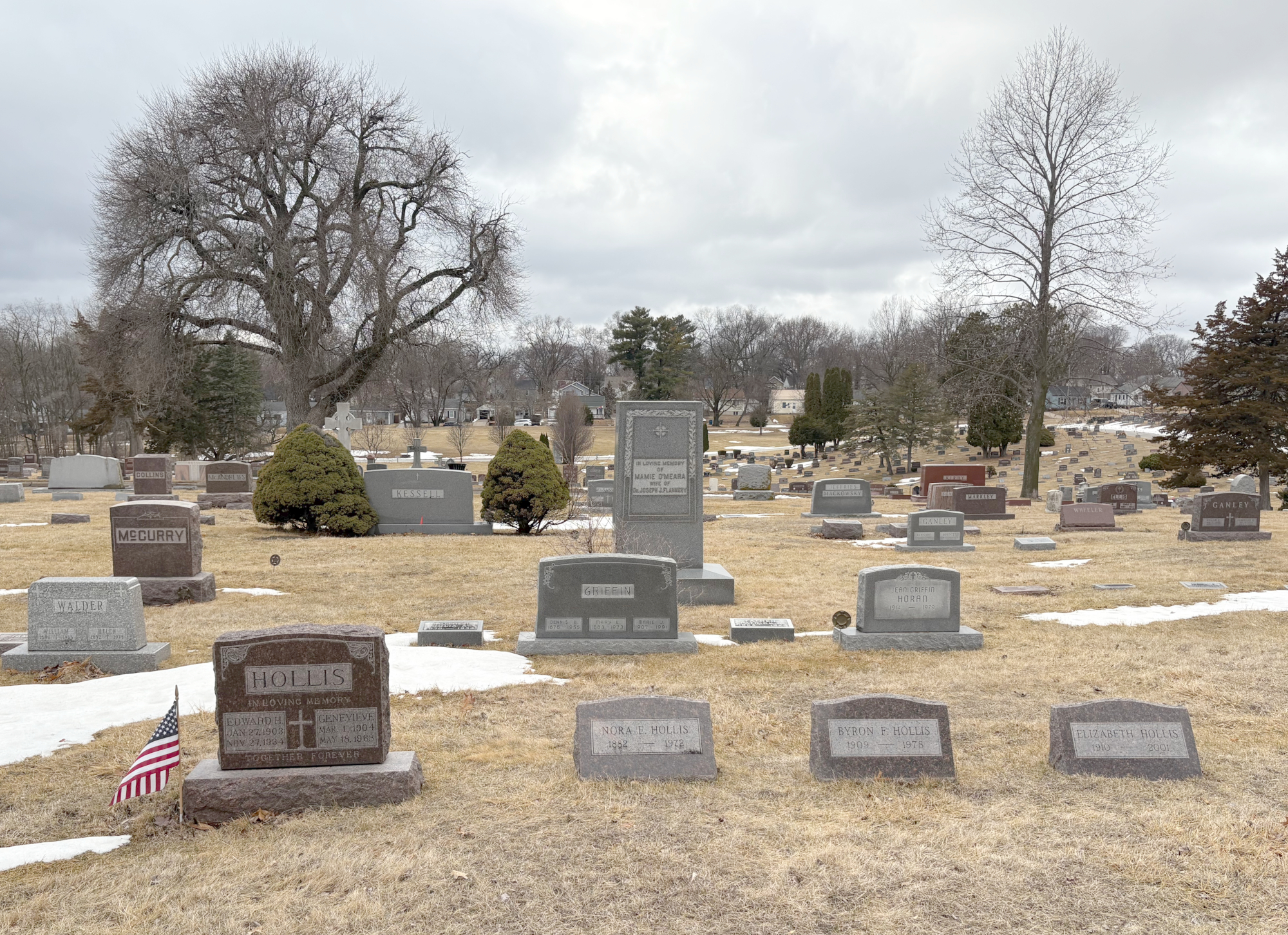
Hollis's grave at Glendale Cemetery

In 1934, the FBI put Inspector Samuel P. Cowley of the FBI's Chicago Office in charge of the search for Baby Face Nelson. On November 27, 1934, Cowley received a tip that Nelson had been recognised in Lake Geneva, Wisconsin, driving a stolen car. Cowley and Special Agent Hollis left the FBI's Chicago office heading northwest on Northwest Highway to intercept Nelson; Hollis drove.

Local FBI special agents William Ryan and Tom McDade spotted a vehicle matching the description of Nelson's stolen car between Fox River Grove and Barrington, Illinois and realized that Nelson, Nelson's accomplice John Paul Chase, and Nelson's wife Helen Gillis were in the vehicle. The occupants of the two cars recognized each other, and Agents Ryan and McDade began a pursuit. After a series of u-turns, Chase shot at Ryan and McDade's vehicle with an automatic rifle. The gunfire broke windows on both cars. Agent Ryan then returned fire, hitting the radiator of Nelson's car.

Hollis and Cowley met up with the outlaws as Nelson, whose car was partially disabled from Agent Ryan's shots, left Northwest Highway and stopped his car near the entrance to what is now Langendorf Park in Barrington. Chase, Nelson and Gillis all got out of the car, and Gillis ran toward a nearby field and flung herself down in the grass. When Hollis and Cowley stopped and emerged from their car to apprehend the suspects, Nelson and Chase began firing at them. Hollis and Cowley took cover behind their vehicle; neither was wearing a bulletproof vest. Both agents returned fire, and Hollis wounded Nelson with a shotgun blast to the legs. Nelson, still standing, continued shooting at Hollis with a rifle. Having emptied his shotgun, Hollis pulled out a pistol and fired as he ran to take cover behind a nearby telephone pole. An eyewitness later recalled that it was at that time that one of the agents "ran across the road and got behind an electric pole, but he got his head blown off." Nelson had struck Hollis in the forehead.

Nelson staggered over to where Hollis lay by the pole before making his way to the FBI agents' car. Since Nelson and Chase's stolen car was no longer operable, Chase assisted the badly wounded Nelson into Cowley's car and transferred their guns and equipment into the agents' vehicle. Gillis, who had continued lying in the field during the shootout, jumped into the government vehicle as Chase drove it away. The fierce gun battle was over in less than five minutes.

The first bystander to reach the scene ran to where Hollis lay face down; he had suffered severe wounds to the back of his head. The man tried to speak to Hollis, but Hollis only moved his eyes and gasped. Next, the man ran to Inspector Cowley. Cowley, who suffered serious stomach wounds in the gunfight, instructed the man to look after Hollis first, then call the Chicago field office and report what had happened. Flagging down a car, witnesses loaded Hollis inside and directed the driver to Barrington General Hospital; Hollis died before they reached the hospital only a short distance away. A witness then found a rosary in Hollis' pocket and called a priest. Cowley died early the next morning at a hospital in Elgin, Illinois, after unsuccessful stomach surgery. Nelson, critically injured, died at approximately 8 pm that evening.

Hollis was survived by his wife and young son, Edward, who found out about his death when they arrived at the FBI Chicago Field Office that day to surprise Hollis to go Christmas shopping. Hollis is buried in Glendale Cemetery in his hometown of Des Moines, Iowa.

=== Aftermath ===
Prosecutors indicted Chase for the murders of both Hollis and Cowley, but for some reason Chase was not immediately tried for Hollis's murder, only for murdering Cowley. Convicted of that crime, Chase began serving his lengthy jail sentence; however, by the mid-1950s Chase had still not been tried for Hollis's murder. Hoover announced that if Chase were ever released from prison, then Hoover would prosecute Chase for Hollis's murder. Chase was aware of the pending indictment for Hollis's murder but took no action for approximately twenty years. Then, in April 1955, Chase or his attorneys filed a motion demanding that prosecutors either seek an immediate trial on Hollis's murder or dismiss the indictment altogether. Prosecutors opposed the motion, but later that year, the United States District Court dismissed the indictment, holding that Chase was entitled to a speedy trial on the indictment for Hollis's murder and that Chase's mere knowledge of the indictment and his failure to take action did not waive this right. With this indictment dismissed, Chase became eligible for parole; he was eventually paroled in 1966 and died of cancer in 1973.
