= John Paul Chase =

American bank robber and Depression-era outlaw

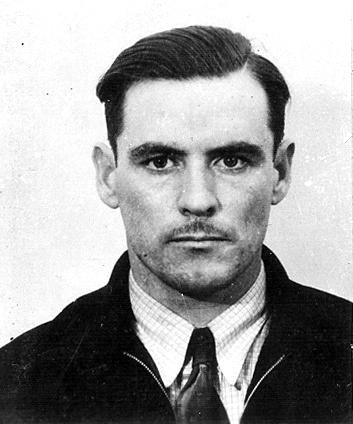
- Born: December 26, 1901; San Francisco, California, U.S.
- Died: October 5, 1973 (aged 71); Palo Alto, California, U.S.
- Occupations: Bank robber, Bootlegger
- Status: Paroled in 1966
- Conviction: Murder (1935)
- Penalty: Life imprisonment

John Paul Chase (December 26, 1901 – October 5, 1973) was an American bank robber and Depression-era outlaw. He was a longtime criminal associate of the Karpis-Barker Gang and most notably Baby Face Nelson who later brought him into the John Dillinger gang. FBI Director J. Edgar Hoover once referred to Chase as "a rat with a patriotic-sounding name". Chase and Nelson continued to rob banks with John Dillinger until Dillinger's death in July 1934. After the death of Nelson in November 1934, Chase fled back to California where he was arrested a month later on December 27, 1934. Chase was sent to Alcatraz where he became one of the longest-serving inmates; (March 31, 1935 – September 21, 1954).

== Biography ==
John Paul Chase was born in San Francisco, California on December 26, 1901. He left grade school to work on a ranch and later became an assistant machinist in a railroad yard. In 1926, Chase was fired from the railroad and was hired as a chauffeur for a professional gambler in Reno, Nevada. He spent the next few years as a bootlegger in Sausalito, San Rafael and San Francisco but was not involved in major crime until his association with Baby Face Nelson in the early 1930s, possibly in March 1932. Little is known of his first meeting with Nelson, however a popular story claims Chase was the wheelman in a contract murder Nelson carried out in Reno. It is generally agreed among crime historians that Reno was the most likely place where the two first became partners, Nelson having connections in the local underworld and frequently hid out there while in Chicago and the general Midwest.

On October 23, 1933, he and Nelson robbed their first bank together in Brainerd, Minnesota escaping with $32,000. Along the way, they picked up a number of other outlaws including Charles Fisher, Tommy Carroll and Homer Van Meter. By March 1934, Nelson had joined John Dillinger's gang although Chase did not participate in their first holdup that month in Sioux Falls, South Dakota. It is unclear when Chase was brought into the gang, some accounts claiming he took part in a robbery in Mason City, Iowa. He spent much of his time as a "gopher" for Nelson while the gang was in the Chicago area. Among his errands were picking up take-out meals, acquiring weapons and ammunition, and running messages between Nelson and Dillinger. His relatively minor status within the gang was possibly the reason he was not present at the shootout with the FBI when federal agents raided the Little Bohemia Lodge near Manitowish Waters, Wisconsin on April 22. In the aftermath of the Mason City robbery, Nelson and John Paul Chase fled west to Reno, where their old bosses Bill Graham and Jim McKay were fighting a federal mail fraud case. Years later, the FBI determined that, on March 22, 1934, Nelson and Chase abducted the chief witness against the pair, Roy Fritsch, and killed him. Fritsch's quartered body, while never found, was said to have been thrown down an abandoned mine shaft.

Chase's first confirmed robbery with the Dillinger gang occurred on June 30, 1934, when he joined Dillinger, Nelson, Van Meter and two others robbed a bank in South Bend, Indiana for $29,890. This was a disappointing amount considering the gang's past bank heists and, to make matters worse, a local police officer was killed during their getaway. Dillinger and Van Meter were killed by the FBI during the next two months and Chase fled with Nelson back to Reno for a while. They eventually returned to Chicago where, on November 26, they stole a car and drove to Wisconsin to stay in one of their safe houses. Upon finding federal agents staking out their hideout however, they turned back to Illinois where they ran into an FBI ambush while driving near Barrington, Illinois the next day. Nelson was mortally wounded during the gun battle, however he managed to kill agents Samuel Cowley and Herman "Ed" Hollis before dying of his wounds, allowing Chase to escape.

Alone and friendless in Chicago, he was able to disappear for a time. Chase was not identified in the gunfight, authorities and journalists speculating either Alvin Karpis or John "Red" Hamilton as the second gunman, and decided to leave town while he had the opportunity; four days later, Chase answered a newspaper ad under the name Elmer Rockwood to transport a car to Seattle, Washington. While he was on the road, his name was given to federal agents by Helen Nelson and for the first time authorities began actively searching for him. On December 27, Chase was eventually arrested by police at Mount Shasta, California while working at a state fish hatchery and extradited to Chicago. He was the first man to be charged under a recently passed law making it a federal crime to kill a federal agent. On March 24, 1935, Chase was tried and convicted for the murder of agent Sam Cowley and sentenced to life imprisonment. He was officially sent to Alcatraz on March 31, 1935.

Chase had earned the ire of FBI Director J. Edgar Hoover, presumably for his involvement in the murder of Cowley and Hollis, and once referred to him as "a rat with a patriotic sounding name". Hoover personally intervened in his first parole hearing in 1950, which was rejected on the basis of his objection, and ordered the surveillance of the prison chaplain who supported his parole. In a memorandum to his field agents, Hoover wrote "Watch closely and endeavor to thwart the efforts of this priest who should be attending to his own business instead of trying to turn loose on society such mad dogs".

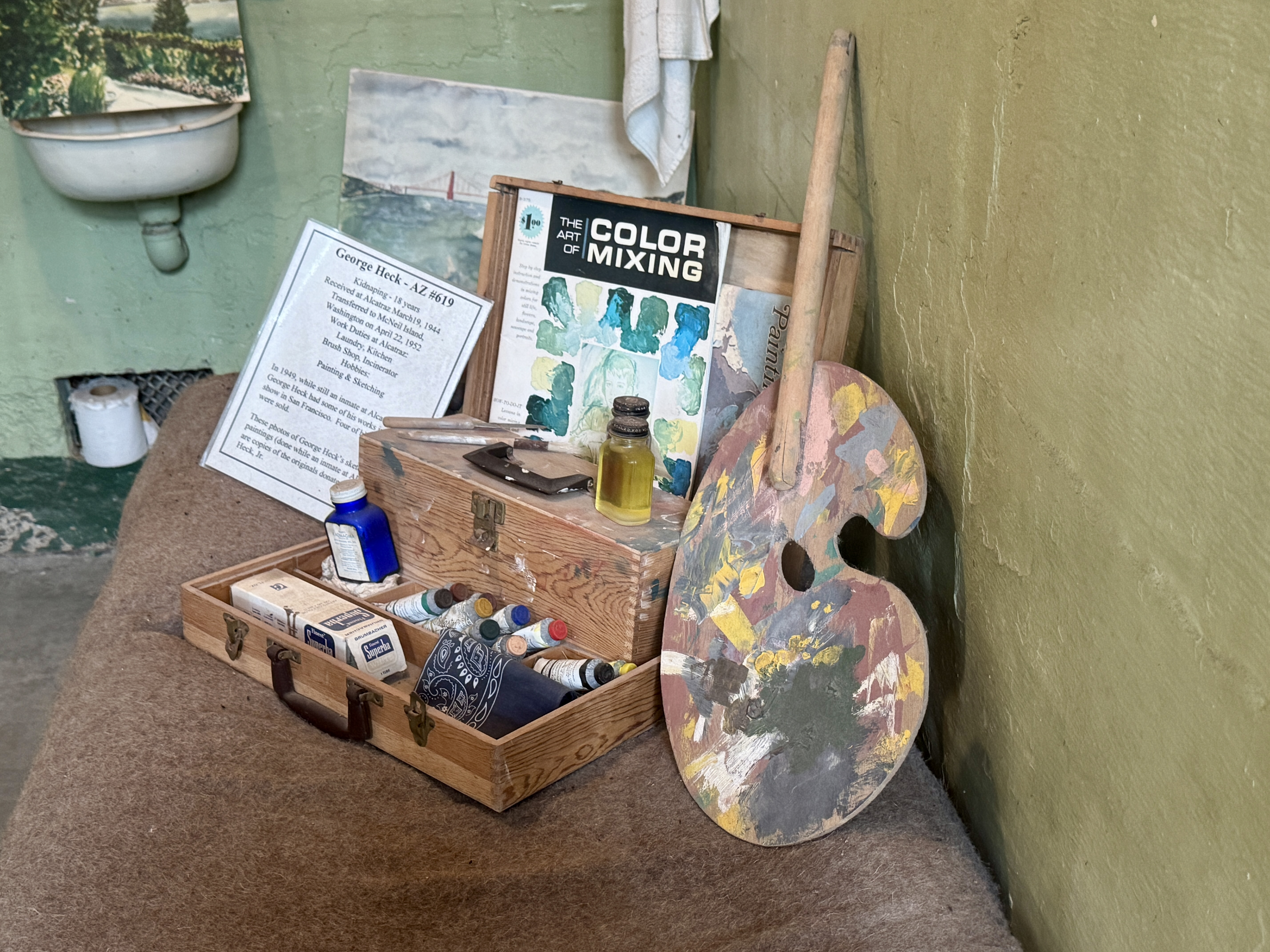
John Paul Chase's painting kit on display in his old cell at Alcatraz Federal Penitentiary.

John Paul Chase was the first person sent directly to Alcatraz prison where only Alvin Karpis was there longer than Chase's nearly 20 years (March 31, 1935 - September 21, 1954). While incarcerated at Alcatraz prison corrections officer Frank Heaney would later recall in his autobiography, Inside the Walls of Alcatraz, that Father Clark, the prison's Catholic chaplain, first got him interested in painting. At one point during his stay, the prison had an art instructor who came over from San Francisco to teach the formal techniques of painting. He made a famous painting of a boat, the "J.P. Chase" leaving for San Francisco, with the viewpoint being from the island. He had paintings displayed in the prison and small art galleries, and often sold them. At Alcatraz he worked as a cobbler and was put under the personal guard of Frank Heaney, the youngest corrections officer at the prison during its operation.

In September 1954, Chase was transferred to Leavenworth where his second appeal for parole was once again rejected due to Hoover's efforts. Hoover had announced that he would prosecute Chase for the murder of Hollis were he to be released, but this was vetoed by a federal judge who ruled that a 21-year delay in prosecuting the crime clearly violated Chase's constitutional right to a "speedy trial".

Chase remained in prison for another decade before he was finally released on parole, despite Hoover's protests, on October 31, 1966, after 32 years, and moved back to the Bay Area. Chase worked as a custodian at St. Joseph’s Seminary Los Altos, California until his death from cancer on October 5, 1973, outliving Hoover by one year, five months, and three days.
