= Alston Purvis =

American artist and author (born 1943)

Philip Alston Wilcox Purvis
- Born: 1943
- Occupation(s): Graphic designer, Artist, Professor and Author
- Parent(s): Marie Rosanne Willcox Purvis; Melvin Purvis

Philip Alston Willcox Purvis (born 1943), son of Melvin Purvis, is an American graphic designer, artist, professor and author.

== Biography ==
He received his BFA in graphic design from Virginia Commonwealth University and an MFA in graphic design, Yale University. He was an art tutor at The Royal Academy of Art, The Hague, The Netherlands.

He was an associate professor at Boston University College of Fine Arts where he has been chairman of the department since September 1982. He served as Director Ad Interim for the School of Visual Arts at the Boston University College of Communication (1969); and the University of South Carolina. He has presented lectures at the American Institute of Graphic Arts, the Wolfsonian Foundation at Florida International University, and many other venues. He has written several books. He wrote a biography of his father, Melvin Purvis and his feud with J. Edgar Hoover, The Vendetta: FBI Hero Melvin Purvis’s War Against Crime and J. Edgar Hoover’s War Against Him.

== Published works ==
=== Books ===
As author:

- Posters NL, 100 jaar affiches in Nederland (with Cees W. de Jong, Martijn F. Le Coultre), VK Projects, 2007. (ISBN 978-90-5212-005-8)
- Jan Tschichold: Posters of the Avantgarde (with Martijn F. Le Coultre), V&K Publishing, Laren, The Netherlands, 2006. (ISBN 9783764376048)
- Dutch Graphic Design, Thames & Hudson, London, 2006. (ISBN 050051285X)
- Megg's History of Graphic Design, (with Philip B. Meggs) 4th edition, John Wiley & Sons, Hoboken, 2005. (ISBN 978-0-471-69902-6)
- The Vendetta: FBI Hero Melvin Purvis’s War Against Crime and J. Edgar Hoover’s War Against Him Public Affairs, New York 2005. (ISBN 1586483013)
- Creative Type: A Sourcebook of Classic and Contemporary Letterforms' (Co-author) Thames & Hudson, 2005. (ISBN 0500512299)
- H.N. Werkman Laurence King, London; Yale University Press, New Haven; Atrium, Amsterdam, 2004 (ISBN 0300102909)
- Graphic Design 20th Century (Co-author). V&K Publishing, Blaricum, The Netherlands, 2003 (ISBN 1568984146)
- A Century of Posters (Co-author) V&K Publishing, Blaricum, The Netherlands, 2002 (ISBN 9040088101)
- Wendingen 1918-1932 (Co-author) Princeton Architectural Press, New York; V&K Publishing, Laren, N.H., The Netherlands, 2001 (ISBN 1568982763)
- Dutch Graphic Design: 1918-1945. Van Nostrand Reinhold, New York, 1992 (ISBN 0442004443)
- Type: A Visual History of Typefaces and Graphic Styles, Vol.2, (with Cees W. de Jong and Jan Tholenaar), Taschen, Cologne 2010, (ISBN 978-3-8365-1514-6)

As contributor:

- Hendrik Nicolaas Werkman and The Next Call Massachusetts College of Art Catalogue, September 1994
- "H.N. Werkman: The Calendar as Medium" Ploeg Jaarboek 2004, (Ploeg Annual 2004)

Stichting De Ploeg, Groninger Museum Groningen, The Netherlands, 2005

- "Graphic Design History", "Renewal and Upheaval: Dutch Graphic Design Between the Wars", "H.N. Werkman: The Outsider", Edited by Steven Heller and Georgette Balance, Allworth Press, New York, 2001

=== Articles ===
- "In Agris Occupatis, Dutch Design During the German Occupation." Print Magazine, July/August 1996
- "The Typographic Art of H. N. Werkman" Print Magazine, May/June 1995
- "The Extraordinary Signs of Walker Evans", Print Magazine, September/October 1993
- "Renewal and Upheaval, Dutch Design Between the Wars", Print Magazine, November/December 1991

=== Exhibits ===
- "Dutch Graphic Design, 1918-1945", The David and Sandra Bakalar Gallery, Massachusetts College of Art, Boston, Massachusetts, September 8 - October 29, 1994
- "Facets of the Same Nature; A Survey of Contemporary Dutch Ceramics", The David and Sandra Bakalar Gallery, Massachusetts College of Art, Boston, Massachusetts, September 8 - October 29, 1994
- "The European Avant Garde Poster: Vintage posters from The Netherlands, Germany, Switzerland, Italy, and Russia", Boston University Art Gallery, Boston, Massachusetts, October 7 - December 1, 1993
