= Little Bohemia Lodge =

Lodge and restaurant in Wisconsin, USA

Little Bohemia Lodge is a rural vacation lodge and restaurant located off US Highway 51 in Manitowish Waters, Wisconsin. The lodge was built in 1929 by Emil Wanatka on land he acquired that same year. Little Bohemia gained fame and infamy as the setting of a botched raid by the FBI, then called the Bureau of Investigation, against the John Dillinger Gang.

The historic rustic lodge remains as it was at the time of the federal raid and along with original bullet holes from the gun battle still in the walls and windows, Little Bohemia Lodge has a collection of memorabilia from the gun battle.

== The Gun Battle ==
Little Bohemia Lodge Raid
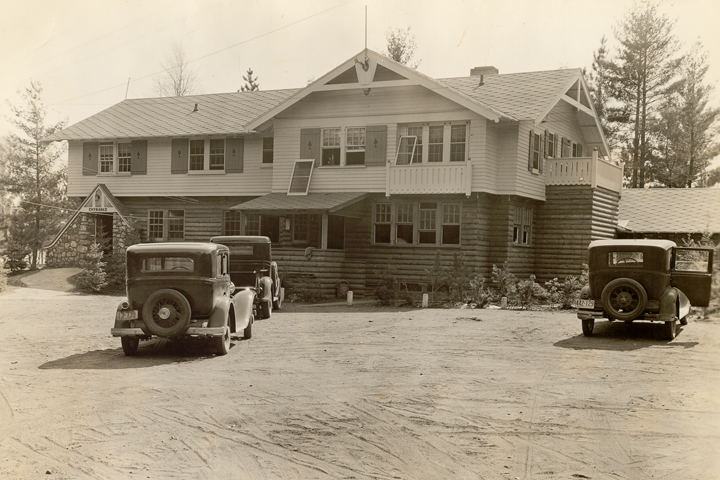
- Little Bohemia Lodge as it looked in 1934.
- Location: 46°07′09.8″N 89°51′28.4″W; Little Bohemia Lodge; 5625 Little Bohemia Lane; Manitowish Waters, Wisconsin
- Date: Sunday, April 22, 1934; 92 years ago 8:00 p.m. (CST)
- Target: The Dillinger Gang
- Attack type: Police raid
- Deaths: W. Carter Baum (FBI special agent); Eugene Boisneau (lodge customer)
- Injuries: Jay Newman (FBI special agent); Carl Christensen (Spider Lake constable); John Hoffman (lodge customer); John Morris (lodge customer)
- Assailants: Baby Face Nelson; John Dillinger; Homer Van Meter; Tommy Carroll; John "Red" Hamilton; Pat Reilly
- Convictions: Harboring a fugitive, later paroled: Helen Gillis (Nelson's wife); Marie Comforti (Van Meter's girlfriend); Jean Delaney (Carroll's wife)

On the afternoon of April 20, 1934, Baby Face Nelson, John Dillinger, Homer Van Meter, Tommy Carroll, John Hamilton, and gang associate (errand-runner) Pat Reilly, accompanied by Nelson's wife Helen and three girlfriends of the other men, arrived at the secluded Little Bohemia Lodge in Manitowish Waters, Wisconsin, for a weekend of rest. The gang's connection to the resort apparently came from the past dealings between Dillinger's attorney, Louis Piquett, and lodge owner Emil Wanatka.

Though gang members greeted him by name, Wanatka maintained that he was unaware of their identities until some time on Friday night. According to Bryan Burrough's book Public Enemies: America's Greatest Crime Wave and the Birth of the FBI, 1933–34, this most likely happened when Wanatka was playing cards with Dillinger, Nelson, and Hamilton. When Dillinger won a round and raked in the pot, Wanatka caught a glimpse of Dillinger's pistol concealed in his coat, and noticed that Nelson and the others also had shoulder holsters.

The following day, while she was away from the lodge with her young son at a children's birthday party, Wanatka's wife Nan informed her brother-in-law, Henry Voss, that the Dillinger gang was at the lodge. She later slipped him a note hidden inside a pack of cigarettes urging him to report the gang. Voss passed the tip to U.S. Marshal's office, who relayed it the Federal Bureau of Investigation (FBI) early on the morning of Sunday, April 22. FBI agent Melvin Purvis returned a call to Voss to confirm the information. Convinced the tip was legit, Purvis and a number of his colleagues travelled immediately to Wisconsin by plane from Chicago, calling in agents from the St. Paul office to rendezvous with them as well. Upon arriving in the nearest town of Rhinelander, agents were met by Henry and Ruth Voss, who informed them the gang's departure was imminent. The agents decided to move in immediately with little preparation, and without notifying or obtaining help from local authorities.

Wanatka offered a one-dollar dinner special on Sunday nights, and the last of a crowd, estimated at 75 people, were leaving as the agents arrived in the front driveway. A 1933 Chevrolet coupé was leaving at that moment with three departing lodge customers, John Hoffman, Eugene Boisneau and John Morris. The agents shouted at the men to stop, but the shouting was apparently not heard over the car radio and the men began to drive away. The agents quickly opened fire on them, instantly killing Boisneau and wounding the others, and alerting the gang members inside.

Adding to the chaos, Pat Reilly returned to the lodge after an out-of-town errand for Van Meter at the same time, accompanied by one of the gang's girlfriends, Pat Cherrington. Accosted by the agents, Reilly and Cherrington backed out and escaped under fire, after a number of misfortunes.

Dillinger, Van Meter, Hamilton, and Carroll escaped through the unguarded back of the lodge and made their way on foot to a nearby resort, where they commandeered a car and its driver. The driver, Robert Johnson, was woken in the night at his cabin at Mitchell's Resort and forced to chauffeur the gang roughly 60 miles before being released unharmed and ordered to keep walking until morning. His Model A Ford was later abandoned in St. Paul, Minnesota. Carroll was not far behind them. He made it to Manitowish and stole a car, making it uneventfully to St. Paul.

Nelson was outside the lodge in the adjacent cabin, and he characteristically attacked the raiding party head on. He exchanged fire with Purvis before retreating into the lodge under a return volley from other agents. He slipped out the back and fled in the opposite direction from the others. Emerging from the woods ninety minutes later, a mile away from Little Bohemia, Nelson kidnapped the Lange couple from their home and ordered them to drive him away. Apparently dissatisfied with the car's speed, he ordered them to pull up at a brightly lit house. It was the home of switchboard operator Alvin Koerner.

Already aware of the ongoing events, Koerner phoned authorities at one of the involved lodges to report a suspicious vehicle in front of his home. Shortly after this, Nelson entered the home, taking the Koerners hostage. Emil Wanatka arrived with his brother-in-law George LaPorte and a lodge employee. A fourth man remained in the car. The three new arrivals were also taken prisoner. Nelson ordered Koerner and Wanatka back into the vehicle, where the fourth man remained unnoticed in the back seat.

As they were preparing to leave, with Wanatka driving at gunpoint, another car arrived with federal agents W. Carter Baum and Jay Newman, and a local constable, Carl Christensen. Nelson asked the men who they were and upon the agents identifying themselves, Nelson opened fire with a custom-converted machine gun pistol, severely wounding Christensen (who was seriously wounded 9 times in the chest, arms and legs) and Newman (who was seriously wounded by a single gunshot wound in the head) and killing Baum, who was shot three times in the neck. Nelson was later quoted as having said that Baum had him "cold" and couldn't understand why he hadn't fired. It was later discovered that the safety catch on Baum's gun was on.

Nelson then stole the FBI car. Less than 15 miles away, the car suffered a flat tire and became mired in mud as Nelson attempted unsuccessfully to change it. Back on foot, he wandered into the woods and took up residence with a Chippewa family in their secluded cabin for several days before making his final escape in another commandeered vehicle.

Three of the women who had accompanied the gang, including Nelson's wife Helen Gillis, were captured inside the lodge. After grueling interrogation by the FBI, the three were ultimately convicted on harboring charges and released on parole. The arrest of the three, together with the prior arrest of Dillinger's girlfriend Billie Frechette in an earlier bungled raid, led to mockery of the FBI's ineptitude with the saying that, "The bureau may not always get its man, but it always gets his woman."

Indeed, with a federal agent and a civilian dead, and four more severely wounded, including two more civilians, and the complete escape of the Dillinger gang, the FBI came under severe criticism. The incident led to calls for FBI director J. Edgar Hoover's resignation and a widely circulated petition demanding Purvis's suspension.

== Public Enemies ==
In the summer of 2008, some scenes from the Michael Mann film Public Enemies were filmed on location at Little Bohemia. The Model A Ford that the gang commandeered from Robert Johnson and later abandoned in St. Paul, still preserved with its bullet holes and bloodstains, was itself used in the film.

The events of the shootout were drastically altered for artistic purposes, such as showing Nelson and Van Meter being gunned down by Purvis in a grassy field near Little Bohemia, when in reality, Van Meter was killed in August 1934 in St. Paul, and Nelson was killed in November 1934 in a shootout that also led to the deaths of agents Samuel P. Cowley and Herman Hollis.

== Today ==
Little Bohemia remains operational today as a restaurant and gathering place. A historic display of artifacts and memorabilia from the Dillinger gun battle is available for public viewing along with recent memorabilia and autographs from the filming of Public Enemies.
