= Baby Face Nelson =

American bank robber (1908–1934)

Lester Joseph Gillis
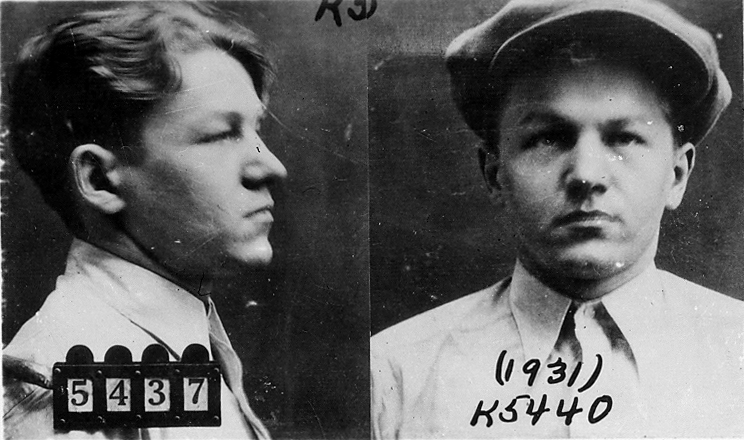
- Gillis' 1931 mugshot
- Born: December 6, 1908; Chicago, Illinois, U.S.
- Died: November 27, 1934 (aged 25); Wilmette, Illinois, U.S.
- Cause of death: Gunshot wounds
- Occupations: Gangster, bank robber
- Spouse: Helen Gillis (m. 1928)
- Children: 2
- Criminal charges: Accidental shooting; theft; bank robbery; murder; kidnapping; assault with intent to kill
- Penalty: 1921–1924; 1931–1932

Lester Joseph Gillis (December 6, 1908 – November 27, 1934), also known as George Nelson and Baby Face Nelson, was an American bank robber who became a criminal partner of John Dillinger when he helped Dillinger escape from prison in Crown Point, Indiana. Later, the Federal Bureau of Investigation (FBI) announced that Nelson and the remaining gang of bank robbers were collectively "Public Enemy Number One".

The "Baby Face Nelson" nickname derived from Gillis being a short man with a youthful appearance; however, in the professional realm, Gillis's fellow criminals addressed him as "Jimmy". A violent bank robber, Lester Joseph Gillis has killed more FBI agents than any other criminal. FBI agents fatally wounded Baby Face Nelson in the Battle of Barrington, fought in a suburb of Chicago.

== Early life ==
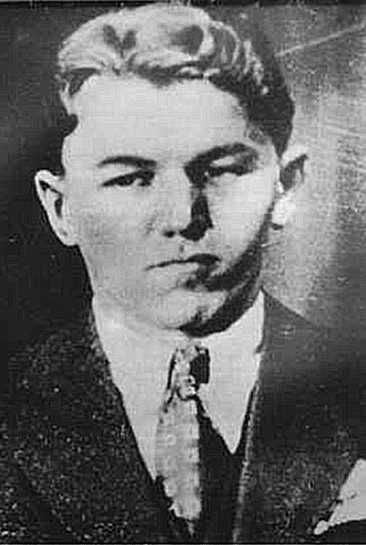
Lester Joseph Gillis

Nelson was born Lester Joseph Gillis, a son of Flemish Belgian immigrants on December 6, 1908, in Chicago, Illinois. He was arrested on July 4, 1921, at the age of twelve, after he accidentally shot a playmate in the jaw with a pistol that he had found. He served over a year in the state reformatory.

== Criminal career ==
=== Gang affiliation ===
By the time he met his future wife Helen Wawrzyniak, Nelson was working at a Standard Oil station in his neighborhood which doubled as the headquarters for a group of young tire thieves, known colloquially as "strippers". Nelson fell into association with the "strippers", and acquainted himself with a number of local criminals, including one who employed him to drive bootleg alcohol throughout the Chicago suburbs. Nelson became associated with members of the suburb-based Touhy Gang.

=== Armed robbery ===
Within two years, Nelson and the gang were involved in organized crime, especially armed robbery. On January 6, 1930, the associates forced entry into the home of magazine executive Charles M. Richter. After trussing him up with adhesive tape and cutting the phone lines, they ransacked the house and made off with approximately $205,000 worth of jewelry (equivalent to approximately $4.0 million in 2025 dollars). Two months later, they carried out a similar robbery at the bungalow of Lottie Brenner Von Buelow (on Sheridan Road). This job netted approximately $50,000 worth of jewelry. After the crime, Chicago newspapers nicknamed the group "The Tape Bandits".

=== Bank robbery ===
On April 21, 1930, Nelson robbed a bank for the first time, making off with approximately $4,000. A month later, he and his gang netted $25,000 worth of jewelry from home invasions. On October 3, Nelson robbed the Itasca State Bank of $4,600; a teller later identified him as one of the robbers. Three nights later, he stole the jewelry of the wife of Chicago mayor Big Bill Thompson, valued at $18,000. She described her attacker, saying "He had a baby face. He was good looking, hardly more than a boy, had dark hair and was wearing a gray topcoat and a brown felt hat, turned down brim." Nelson and his crew were later linked to a botched roadhouse robbery in Summit, Illinois, on November 23, 1930. In the ensuing gunfight, three people were killed and three wounded. Three nights later, Nelson's gang robbed a tavern on Waukegan Road, and Nelson committed his first murder of note when he fatally shot stockbroker Edwin R. Thompson.

== 1931–1932 ==
Throughout the winter of 1931, most of the Tape Bandits were rounded up, including Nelson. The Chicago Tribune referred to their leader as "George 'Baby Face' Nelson" who received a sentence of one year to life in the state penitentiary at Joliet. Nelson escaped during a prison transfer in February 1932. Aided by his contacts within the Touhy Gang, Nelson fled west to Reno, where he was harbored by William Graham, a known crime boss and gambler. Using the alias "Jimmy Johnson", Nelson went to Sausalito, California, where he worked for bootlegger Joe Parente. During his San Francisco Bay area criminal ventures, Nelson met John Paul Chase and Fatso Negri, who later became close associates. In Reno the next winter, Nelson first met the vacationing Alvin Karpis, who in turn introduced him to Midwestern bank robber Eddie Bentz. Teaming up with Bentz, Nelson returned to the Midwest the next summer. He committed a major bank robbery in Grand Haven, Michigan, on August 18, 1933; his first in the area. The robbery was not lucrative, though most of those involved made a full escape.

== Gang leader ==
The Grand Haven bank robbery convinced Nelson he was ready to lead his own gang. Through connections at the Green Lantern Tavern in St. Paul, Nelson recruited Homer Van Meter, Tommy Carroll, and Eddie Green. With these men and two other local thieves, Nelson robbed the First National Bank of Brainerd, Minnesota, of $32,000 on October 23, 1933 (equivalent to approximately $796,000 in 2025 dollars). Witnesses reported that Nelson wildly sprayed sub-machine gun bullets at bystanders as he made his getaway. After collecting his wife Helen and four-year-old son Ronald, Nelson left with his crew for San Antonio, Texas. While there, Nelson and his gang bought several weapons from underworld gunsmith Hyman Lehman. One of those weapons was a .38 Super Colt pistol that had been modified so it was fully automatic. Nelson used this gun to kill Special Agent W. Carter Baum at Little Bohemia Lodge several months later.

On December 9, 1933, a local woman tipped off San Antonio police regarding the presence nearby of "high-powered Northern gangsters". Two days later, Tommy Carroll was cornered by two detectives and opened fire, killing Detective H.C. Perrin and wounding Detective Al Hartman. All the Nelson gang, except Nelson, fled San Antonio. Nelson and his wife traveled west to the San Francisco Bay Area, where he recruited John Paul Chase and Fatso Negri for a new wave of bank robberies the following spring.

=== Partnership with John Dillinger ===
On March 3, 1934, John Dillinger made his famous "wooden pistol" escape from the jail in Crown Point, Indiana. Although the details remain in some dispute, the escape is suspected to have been arranged and financed by members of Nelson's newly formed gang, including Homer Van Meter, Tommy Carroll, Eddie Green, and John "Red" Hamilton, with the understanding that Dillinger would repay some part of the bribe money out of his share of the first robbery. The night Dillinger arrived in the Twin Cities, Nelson and his friend John Paul Chase were cut off by another car driven by local paint salesman Theodore Kidder. Nelson lost his temper and gave chase, crowding Kidder to the curb. The salesman exited his vehicle to protest, whereupon Nelson shot him dead.

Two days after this, the new gang (with Hamilton's participation as the sixth man uncertain) struck the Security National Bank at Sioux Falls, South Dakota. In the robbery, which netted around $49,000 (figures differ slightly), Nelson severely wounded motorcycle policeman Hale Keith with a burst of sub-machine-gun fire as the officer was arriving at the scene. The six men were soon identified as "the Second Dillinger gang", due to Dillinger's extreme notoriety, but the gang had no official leader.

On March 13, a week after the robbery in Sioux Falls, the gang robbed the First National Bank in Mason City, Iowa. Dillinger and Hamilton were both shot and wounded in the robbery, where they made off with $52,000. On April 3, federal agents ambushed and killed Eddie Green, though he was unarmed and they were uncertain of his identity. In the aftermath of the Mason City robbery, Nelson and John Paul Chase fled west to Reno, where their old bosses Bill Graham and Jim McKay were fighting a federal mail fraud case. Years later, the FBI determined that on March 22, 1934, Nelson and Chase abducted and killed the chief witness against the pair, Roy Fritsch. Fritsch's quartered body was said to have been thrown down an abandoned mine shaft and was never found.

=== Little Bohemia ===
On the afternoon of April 20, Nelson, Dillinger, Van Meter, Carroll, Hamilton, and gang associate and errand-runner Pat Reilly, accompanied by Nelson's wife Helen and three girlfriends of the other men, arrived at the secluded Little Bohemia Lodge in Manitowish Waters, Wisconsin, for a weekend of rest. The gang's connection to the resort apparently came from previous dealings between Dillinger's attorney, Louis Piquett, and lodge owner Emil Wanatka. Though gang members greeted him by name, Wanatka maintained that he was unaware of their identities until some time later that night. According to Bryan Burrough's book Public Enemies: America's Greatest Crime Wave and the Birth of the FBI, 1933–34, this most likely happened when Wanatka was playing cards with Dillinger, Nelson, and Hamilton. When Dillinger won a round and raked in the pot, Wanatka caught a glimpse of Dillinger's pistol concealed in his coat, and noticed that Nelson and the others also had shoulder holsters.

The following day, while she was away from the lodge with her young son at a children's birthday party, Wanatka's wife informed a friend, Henry Voss, that the Dillinger gang was at the lodge, and the FBI was subsequently given the tip early on April 22. Melvin Purvis and a number of agents arrived by plane from Chicago, and with the gang's departure imminent, attacked the lodge quickly and with little preparation, and without notifying or obtaining help from local authorities.

Wanatka offered a one-dollar dinner special on Sunday nights, and the last of a crowd estimated at 75 people were leaving as the agents arrived in the front driveway. A 1933 Chevrolet coupé was leaving at that moment with three departing lodge customers, John Hoffman, Eugene Boisneau and John Morris, who apparently did not hear an order to halt because the car radio drowned out the agents yelling at them to stop. The agents quickly opened fire on them, instantly killing Boisneau and wounding the others, and alerting the gang members inside.

Adding to the chaos, at this moment Pat Reilly returned to the lodge after an out-of-town errand for Van Meter, accompanied by John Hamilton's girlfriend, Pat Cherrington. Accosted by the agents, Reilly and Cherrington backed out and escaped under fire.

Dillinger, Van Meter, Hamilton, and Carroll escaped through the back of the lodge, which was unguarded, and made their way north on foot through woods and past a lake to commandeer a car and a driver at a resort a mile away. Carroll was not far behind them. He made it to Manitowish and stole a car, making it uneventfully to St. Paul.

Nelson, who had been outside the lodge in the adjacent cabin, characteristically attacked the raiding party head on, exchanging fire with Purvis, before retreating into the lodge under a return volley from other agents. From there he slipped out the back and fled in the opposite direction from the others. Emerging from the woods ninety minutes later, a mile away from Little Bohemia, Nelson kidnapped the Lange couple from their home and ordered them to drive him away. Apparently dissatisfied with the car's speed, he quickly ordered them to pull up at a brightly lit house where the switchboard operator, Alvin Koerner, aware of the ongoing events, quickly phoned authorities at one of the involved lodges to report a suspicious vehicle in front of his home. Shortly after Nelson had entered the home, taking the Koerners hostage, Emil Wanatka arrived with his brother-in-law George LaPorte and a lodge employee (while a fourth man remained in the car) and were also taken prisoner. Nelson ordered Koerner and Wanatka back into their vehicle, where the fourth man remained unnoticed in the back seat.

As they were preparing to leave, with Wanatka driving at gunpoint, another car arrived with two federal agents – W. Carter Baum and Jay Newman – as well as a local constable, Carl Christensen. Nelson asked the agents who they were and upon the agents identifying themselves, Nelson quickly opened fire with his fully automatic pistol, severely wounding Christensen and Newman and killing Baum, who was hit three times in the neck. Nelson was later quoted as having said that Baum had him "cold" and could not understand why he had not fired. It was found that the safety catch on Baum's gun was on.

Nelson stole the FBI car. Less than 15 miles away, the car suffered a flat tire and finally became mired in mud as Nelson attempted unsuccessfully to change it. Back on foot, he wandered into the woods and took up residence with a Chippewa family in their secluded cabin for several days before making his final escape in another commandeered vehicle.

Three of the women who had accompanied the gang, including Nelson's wife Helen, were captured inside the lodge. After grueling interrogations by the FBI, the three were ultimately convicted on harboring charges and released on parole.

With an agent and an innocent bystander dead and four more severely wounded, including two more innocent bystanders, as well as the complete escape of the Dillinger gang, the FBI came under severe criticism, with calls for director J. Edgar Hoover's resignation and a widely circulated petition demanding Purvis' suspension.

=== Public enemy #1 ===
At the time of the Little Bohemia shootout, Nelson's identity as a member of the Dillinger gang had been known to the FBI for two weeks. Following the killing of Baum, Nelson became nationally notorious and was made a high-priority target of the Bureau. The focus on him and the murdered agent served to deflect some of the intense criticism directed at Hoover and Purvis following the Little Bohemia debacle.

A day after the Little Bohemia raid, Dillinger, Hamilton, and Van Meter ran through a police roadblock near Hastings, Minnesota, drawing fire from officers there. A ricocheting bullet struck Hamilton in the back, fatally wounding him. Hamilton reportedly died in hiding on April 30 or May 1, 1934, and was secretly buried by Dillinger and others, including Nelson, who had rejoined the gang in Aurora, Illinois.

On June 7, gang member Tommy Carroll was killed while trying to evade arrest in Waterloo, Iowa. Carroll and his girlfriend, Jean Crompton (who had been captured and tried with Helen Gillis after Little Bohemia), had grown close to the Nelsons, and his death was a personal blow to them. Nelson and his wife went into hiding during the ensuing weeks, and although they were in the Chicago area, their precise movements in this period remain obscure. The Nelsons reportedly lived in various tourist camps, while continuing to secretly meet with family members whenever possible.

On June 27, former gang errand-runner and Little Bohemia fugitive Pat Reilly was arrested in St. Paul, Minnesota.

On the morning of June 30, Nelson, Dillinger, Van Meter, and one or more additional accomplices robbed the Merchants National Bank in South Bend, Indiana. One man involved in the robbery is believed to have been Pretty Boy Floyd, based on several eyewitness identifications as well as the later account of Joseph "Fatso" Negri, an old Nelson associate from California who was serving as a gofer for the gang at this time. Another rumored participant was Nelson's childhood friend, Jack Perkins, also an associate of the gang at that time. (Perkins was later tried for the robbery and acquitted).

When the robbery began, policeman Howard Wagner had been directing traffic outside. Responding quickly to the scene and attempting to draw his gun, he was shot dead by Van Meter, who was stationed outside the bank. During the shootout that followed, Nelson exchanged fire with a local jeweler, Harry Berg, who had shot him in the chest – ineffectively, because of Nelson's bullet-proof vest. As Berg retreated into his store under a return volley from Nelson, a man in a parked car was wounded. Nelson also grappled briefly with a teenage boy, Joseph Pawlowski, who tackled him until Nelson (or Van Meter) stunned Pawlowski with a blow from his gun. When Dillinger and the man identified as Floyd (unconfirmed) emerged from the bank with sacks containing $28,000, they brought three hostages with them (including the bank president) to deter gunfire from three patrolmen on the scene. The policemen fired nonetheless, wounding two of the hostages before grazing Van Meter in the head. The gang escaped, and Van Meter recovered. In the constant and chaotic exchange of gunfire, several other bystanders were wounded by shots, ricochets, or flying broken glass. It was the last confirmed robbery for all of the known and suspected participants, including Floyd (unconfirmed).

During the month of July, as the FBI manhunt for him continued, Nelson and his wife fled to California with associate John Paul Chase, who remained with Nelson for the rest of his life. Upon their return to Chicago on July 15, the gang held a reunion meeting at a favorite rendezvous site. When the meeting was interrupted by two Illinois state troopers, Fred McAllister and Gilbert Cross, Nelson fired on their vehicle with his converted "machine gun pistol", wounding both men as the gangsters retreated. Cross was badly wounded, but both he and McAllister survived. Nelson's responsibility was uncertain until verification came later in the form of a confession from Chase.

On July 22, 1934, Dillinger was ambushed and killed by FBI agents outside the Biograph Theater in Lincoln Park, Chicago. The next day the FBI announced that "Pretty Boy" Floyd was now Public Enemy No. 1. On October 22, 1934, Floyd was killed in a shootout with agents including Melvin Purvis. Subsequently, J. Edgar Hoover announced that Nelson was now Public Enemy No. 1.

On August 23, Van Meter was ambushed and killed by police in St. Paul, Minnesota, leaving Nelson as the sole survivor of the so-called "Second Dillinger Gang".

In the ensuing months, Nelson and his wife, usually accompanied by Chase, drifted west to cities including Sacramento and San Francisco, California and Reno and Las Vegas, Nevada. They often stayed in auto camps, including Walley's Hot Springs, outside Genoa, Nevada, where they hid out from October 1 before returning to Chicago around November 1. Nelson's movements during the final month of his life are largely unknown.

By the end of the month, FBI interest had settled on a former hideout of Nelson's, the Lake Como Inn in Lake Geneva, Wisconsin, where it was believed that Nelson might return for the winter. When the Nelsons and Chase did return to the inn on November 27, they briefly came face to face with surprised and unprepared FBI agents who had staked it out. The fugitives sped away before any shots were fired. Armed with a description of the car (a black Ford V8) and its license plate number (639–578), agents swarmed into the area.

== Death ==
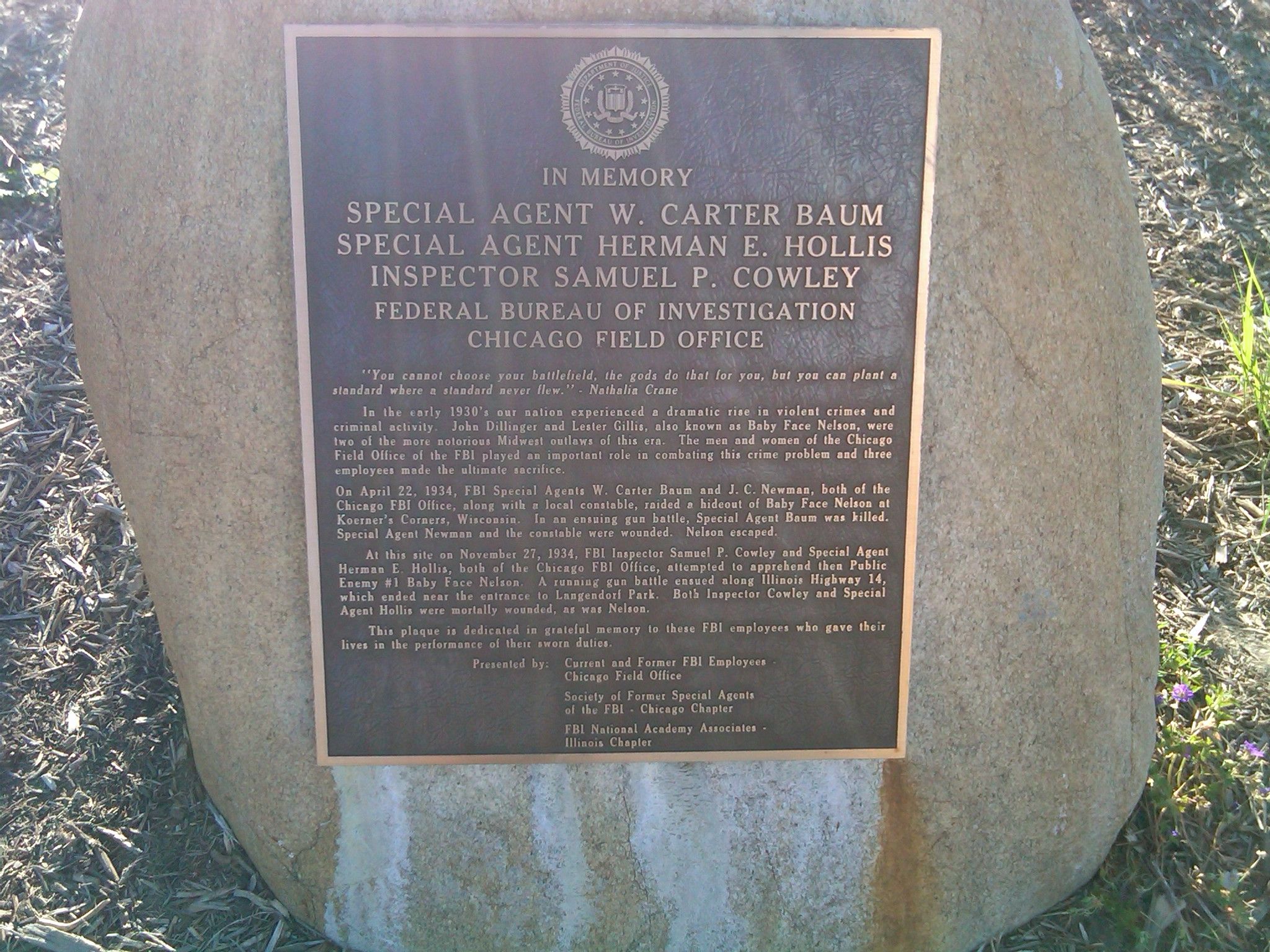
A plaque at the Barrington Park District in Barrington, Illinois, commemorates the lives of the three FBI agents killed by Nelson

Video clips of Depression era gangsters, including Pretty Boy Floyd, Baby Face Nelson, Machine Gun Kelly, and Doc Barker

A short but furious gun battle between FBI agents and Nelson took place on November 27, 1934, outside Chicago in the town of Barrington, culminating in the deaths of Nelson, and FBI agents Herman "Ed" Hollis and Samuel P. Cowley.

On the morning of November 27, Nelson, along with his wife Helen Gillis and associate John Paul Chase, headed south in a stolen V8 Ford towards Chicago on U.S. Highway 12 (now US-14). Nelson, always keen to spot federal agents, caught sight of a sedan driven in the opposite direction by agents Thomas McDade and William Ryan. Both parties simultaneously recognized each other and after several U-turns by both vehicles, Nelson wound up in pursuit of the agents' car. When Nelson's powerful Ford caught up to the agents' slower sedan, Chase opened fire on the agents. Ryan and McDade returned fire, sped up, then pulled into a field and awaited Nelson and Chase, who had stopped pursuing. McDade and Ryan were unaware that one of their bullets had punctured one of the water pumps on Nelson's Ford. With Nelson's Ford rapidly losing power, a Hudson automobile driven by Hollis (who had been given credit as one of the agents who fired the fatal shots that killed Dillinger the previous July) and Cowley, began pursuing the Ford.

With his pursuers attempting to pull alongside, Nelson skidded into the entrance to Barrington's North Side Park. Hollis and Cowley overshot Nelson's car by over 100 feet (30 m), and stopped at an angle. Upon exiting the vehicle's passenger door, the agents took cover behind their car. The ensuing shootout was witnessed by more than a dozen people.

Nelson yelled to Helen to take cover in a nearby ditch, then he and Chase opened fire on the agents. Both Cowley and Hollis returned fire from behind their vehicle. A single .45 slug from Cowley's machine gun struck Nelson in the lower abdomen. Nelson leaned on the Ford's running board, then wordlessly exchanged weapons with Chase. In the din of the gun battle, Chase heard Nelson complain that his weapon was jamming, and the wounded Nelson swapped it out for either a .351 Winchester or a Colt Monitor automatic rifle. Despite his grievous wound, Nelson moved from behind the car and advanced toward the agents while firing his weapon. Two of his bullets struck Cowley. Several buckshot pellets from Hollis's shotgun then struck Nelson in the legs and knocked him down.

As Nelson regained his feet, Hollis, possibly already wounded, moved to better cover behind a utility pole. As he drew his service pistol, Nelson fatally shot Hollis in the head. Nelson staggered over Hollis's body, aimed his weapon at the agent's fallen form for a moment then limped toward the agents' Hudson. Nelson drove the car over to the disabled Ford. After loading the agents' car with the Ford's guns and supplies, Nelson let Chase get behind the wheel of the agents' car and the two men and Helen Gillis fled the scene. Nelson was shot a total of nine times; a single (and ultimately fatal) machine gun slug had struck his abdomen and eight of Hollis's shotgun pellets had hit his legs. Later news reports inaccurately gave his number of wounds as 17, possibly due to a memorandum release by J. Edgar Hoover stating "seven to ten wounds" to Nelson's body. After telling his wife "I'm done for", Nelson gave directions as Chase drove them to a safe house on Walnut Street in Wilmette. Nelson died in bed with his wife at his side, at 7:35 p.m.

Hollis was pronounced dead soon after arriving at the hospital. At a different hospital, Cowley lived for long enough to confer briefly with Melvin Purvis and have surgery, before succumbing to a stomach wound similar to Nelson's. Following a telephone tip from a Chicago Telephone Company employee, Carl Fyhrie, who was working on the telephone lines and saw a body on the ground, Nelson's body was discovered wrapped in an Indian patterned blanket by FBI agent Walter Walsh, in a ditch on the northeast corner of the St. Paul's Lutheran Cemetery in Skokie, and taken to Haben's Funeral Home, both of which still exist. Helen later stated that she had placed the blanket around Nelson's body because, "He always hated being cold".

Newspapers reported, based on the aggressive wording of an order from J. Edgar Hoover ("find the woman and give her no quarter"), that the FBI had issued a "death order" for Nelson's widow, who wandered the streets of Chicago as a fugitive for several days, described in print as the U.S. first female "public enemy". After surrendering on Thanksgiving Day, Helen, who had been paroled after capture at Little Bohemia, served a year in prison for harboring her husband. Chase was apprehended later and served a term at Alcatraz.

== Burial ==
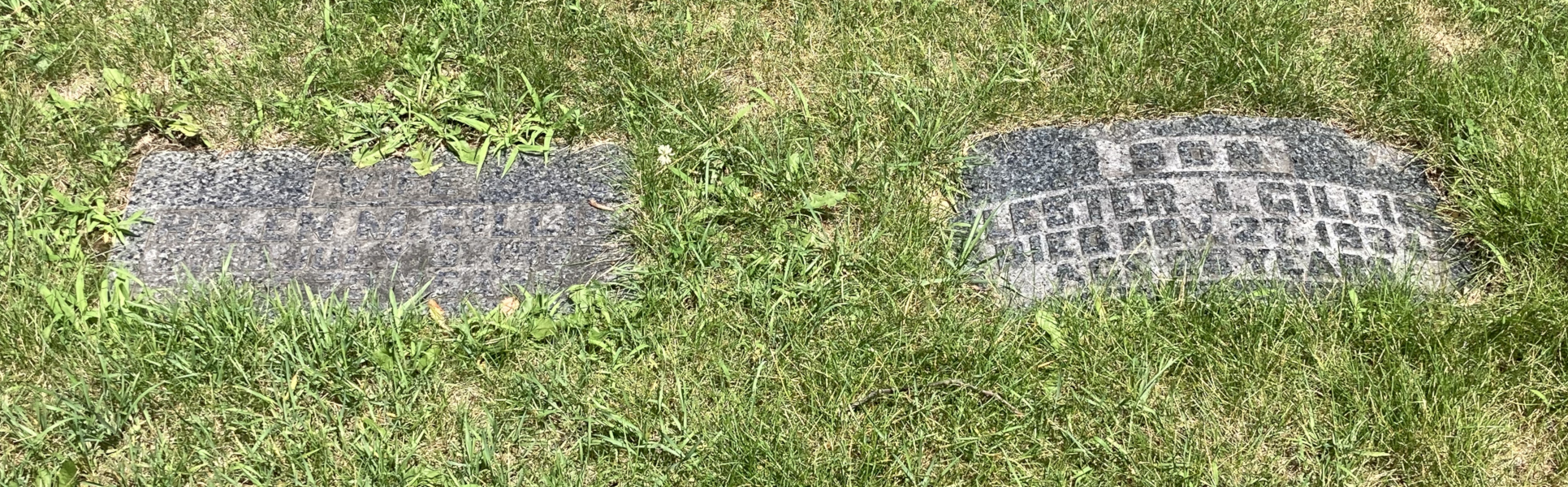
Nelson's grave

Baby Face Nelson and his wife Helen are buried at Saint Joseph's Cemetery in River Grove, Illinois.

== Fictional portrayals ==
Nelson has been portrayed multiple times onscreen. These include:

- Baby Face Nelson, a 1957 film starring Mickey Rooney
- The FBI Story, a 1959 film starring James Stewart, with William Phipps as Nelson
- Dillinger, a 1973 film featuring Richard Dreyfuss as Nelson. In this film the shootout between Nelson and FBI Agents Cowley and Hollis is depicted as taking place during the Little Bohemia raid.
- The Kansas City Massacre, a 1975 TV movie featuring Elliott Street as Nelson
- Baby Face Nelson (1995), a 1995 film starring C. Thomas Howell
- O Brother, Where Art Thou?, a 2000 film featuring Michael Badalucco as George Nelson. He is portrayed as working mostly alone, until meeting up with the main characters and having them along as he robs the next bank in quick succession to break a record. The characters suggest he has Bipolar Disorder, rapidly shifting between energetic highs and depressive lows. When he last appears he is being taken by an angry mob to meet his death in the electric chair. The film is set in Mississippi in 1937, three years after the real Nelson's death.
- Public Enemies, a 2009 film starring American actor Johnny Depp, with Stephen Graham as Nelson. In this film, Nelson is portrayed as being killed by Melvin Purvis alongside Van Meter and Ed Shouse at the Little Bohemia shootout, and thus does not become Public Enemy Number One after Dillinger's death. However, the film still portrays Nelson as getting up and continuing to fire immediately after being shot several times.
- In the A&E drama series Baby Face, produced by Kerry Ehrin and Freddie Highmore with the latter taking on the role of Nelson.
- In Team Fortress 2, there is a primary weapon for Scout called the "Baby Face's Blaster", it is a lever action shotgun similar to the .351 Winchester that Nelson used during the shootout that ended his life.

== See also ==
- List of Depression-era outlaws
