= Melvin Purvis =

American FBI agent (1903–1960)

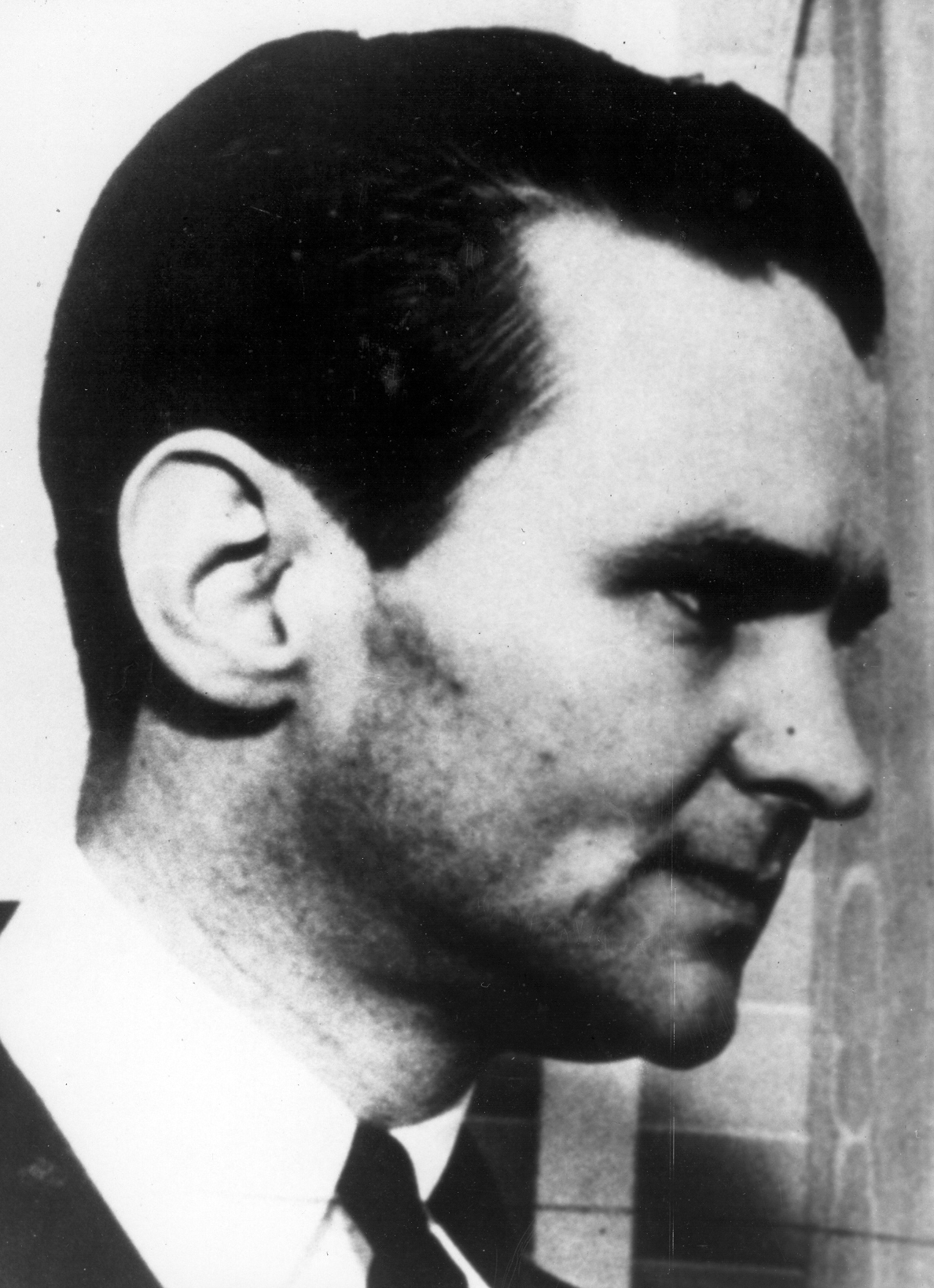
- Born: Melvin Horace Purvis II; October 24, 1903; Timmonsville, South Carolina, United States
- Died: February 29, 1960 (aged 56); Florence, South Carolina, United States
- Cause of death: Gunshot wound
- Resting place: Mount Hope Cemetery
- Education: University of South Carolina School of Law
- Employer: FBI
- Known for: Leading the investigation on the John Dillinger case
- Height: 5 ft 4 in (163 cm)
- Spouse: Marie Rosanne Willcox (m. 1938–1960)
- Children: Melvin Horace Purvis III (1940–1986); Philip Alston Willcox Purvis (b. 1943); Christopher Peronneau Purvis (1950–1984)

Melvin Horace Purvis II (October 24, 1903 – February 29, 1960) was a American FBI agent who was instrumental in capturing bank robbers John Dillinger and Pretty Boy Floyd in 1934. In his later military career, he was directly involved with General George S. Patton, Hermann Göring, and the Nuremberg trials.

== Early life and early career ==
Purvis was born in Timmonsville, South Carolina, to Melvin Horace Purvis Sr. (1869–1938), a tobacco farmer and businessman, and Janie Elizabeth (née Mims, 1874–1927); he was the fifth of eight siblings. He attended Timmonsville High School where in 1920 he was the yearbook's business manager, historian for his graduating class, on the football and baseball teams, was a president of the literary society, on the debate team, and played drums in the school orchestra. He then enrolled in the University of South Carolina and joined the Rho chapter of the Kappa Alpha Order there in 1921. He received his law degree from the University of South Carolina School of Law in 1922. Upon graduating, he passed the bar examination in South Carolina and practiced law in Florence as a junior attorney at the firm of Willcox & Hardee, for two years, and as an insurance adjuster for W. H. Clarkson & Co for 18 months. Seeking adventure, he went to Washington, D.C. and unsuccessfully sought a job in the Foreign Service as a diplomat. He applied at the Justice Department and was hired by the Bureau of Investigation, the forerunner to the FBI, in December 1926 and began serving there in February 1927. BOI investigators looking into Purvis' character and background were told that he was honest, industrious and ambitious, but not brilliant or hard-working enough to be a "money maker".

== Career at the FBI ==
Purvis' performance reviews always rated his appearance and loyalty to the FBI at 100%. He rated lowest for his understanding of the Manual of Instruction and the Manual of Rules and Regulations, which stayed at about 80% and for which FBI Director J. Edgar Hoover once chided him as being unacceptable. Just before becoming Special Agent in Charge of Chicago, his score on the rules and instruction rose to 100% and stayed there. He rose quickly through the ranks and by 1932, he had headed the FBI offices in Birmingham, Alabama, then Oklahoma City followed by a move to Cincinnati. In 1932, Hoover placed him in charge of the Chicago office. He led an investigation into the crash of United Airlines Trip 23, which uncovered foul play as the cause of the crash.

=== The Factor case ===
As Special Agent in Charge at the Chicago office, Purvis investigated John Factor's kidnapping. It happened July 1, 1933, as Factor was returning home from an evening of gambling with friends near Elkhorn, Wisconsin. The man convicted of kidnapping him, Roger Touhy, claimed Factor faked his own kidnapping to avoid extradition to the United Kingdom for fraud. The FBI believed Touhy chose Factor as a victim, because extradition would make Factor avoid help from the authorities. This is what he had done when his son had been previously kidnapped. Factor's own kidnapping was reported, however; thus, the FBI was required to investigate. He was released after 11 days of captivity, burned and beaten. He remembered the face of his abductor, the voices of his captors and environmental details. The house where he was held was found, and from there, investigators tracked back to the Touhy gang. The gang had been arrested the day of Factor's release, their car filled with guns and the equipment used to tie kidnap victims in that era: linen strips and tough window sash cord. With the permission of Elkhorn's law enforcement, agents brought the gang to Purvis in Chicago without an extradition order. Roger Touhy was convicted of the kidnapping and lost on appeal before the Supreme Court of Illinois.

=== John Dillinger ===
John Dillinger was already a convicted felon, paroled on May 22, 1933, when he robbed a bank in New Carlisle, Ohio, on June 10 that year. By March 3, 1934, he formed a gang and robbed ten banks. None of these were federal crimes; it was not until Dillinger drove a car across a state boundary that the FBI could get involved in the hunt for him.

==== The Little Bohemia Lodge ====
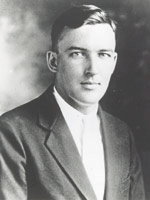
FBI Special Agent W. Carter Baum, who gave his life in the line of duty pursuing Babyface Nelson

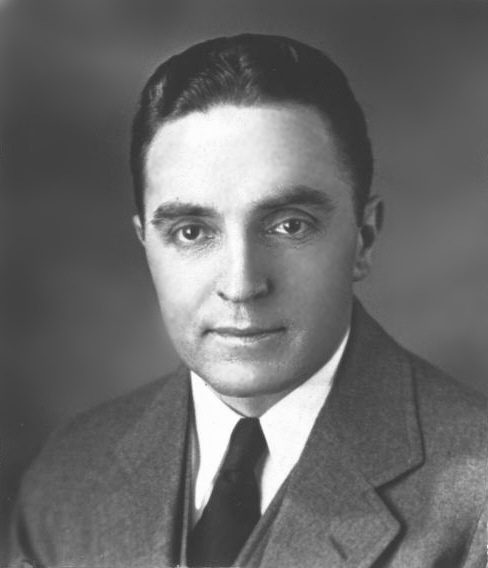
FBI Special Agent Jay C. Newman, wounded in the line of duty by Baby Face Nelson

Dillinger and his gang had been on the run ever since his March 3 escape. They wanted to rest somewhere remote; the Little Bohemia Lodge in remote northern Wisconsin, came up in conversation in on April 19. The gang decided to hide there for a few days, and they arrived the afternoon of April 20. The next day, the owner, Emil Wanatka, and his wife had figured out who they were. Early the next morning Mrs. Wanatka got word out to her brother-in-law, Lloyd Voss, to call a federal authority they knew in Chicago. Purvis was contacted that morning but the lodge was in the jurisdiction of the St. Paul office, not Chicago. So he called that office and passed the tip to FBI Assistant Director Hugh Clegg, assigned by Hoover to oversee the pursuit of Dillinger, as well as FBI Inspector William Rorer and Special Agent in Charge at St. Paul, Werner Hanni. Clegg chartered a plane to carry him and other agents from St. Paul, Minnesota to Rhinelander, Wisconsin. Fifty miles from the lodge, this was the closest they could get by air. Hanni, afraid of flying, travelled with his agents by car and brought the tear gas equipment that the airlines refused to carry for safety reasons. Purvis and his Chicago agents flew in two other planes he chartered to Rhinelander to assist the Minnesota agents.

Clegg arrived first, and scoured the town for cars he could rent. Mr. Voss told him the gangsters had changed their plans and decided to leave that evening after dinner. Clegg sent Purvis and other agents out to pick up the cars he had earlier found at a Ford dealership. Purvis also commandeered the car belonging to the airport bystander who had given them a ride to the dealership.

The only guide the agents had was a diagram drawn by Voss, but they set out at dusk over the slushy, muddy, potholed roads. It took them two hours to reach the lodge, and two cars broke down on the way. The agents rode on the running boards of the remaining cars, clutching their machine guns as best they could. Clegg and Purvis approached the house together. There were no outdoor lights. The Wanatkas' dogs began barking. No one had told them about the dogs, nor about the three innocent diners inside. These three left the lodge and started up their car. Its radio blared loudly. The agents identified themselves, but the customers could not hear them over the radio. Clegg and Purvis simultaneously gave the order to shoot, but instead of gangsters, agents killed Eugene Boiseneau, a 33-year-old Civilian Conservation Corps worker, and wounded Tom Morris, a 59-year-old cook at the CCC camp, and gas station attendant John Hoffman. Purvis tried to return fire on a fleeing figure that fired on them in the dark, but his machine gun jammed. This was Babyface Nelson, who would later kill Special Agent W. Carter Baum, wound Special Agent Jay C. Newman, and wound Sheriff's Deputy Carl C. Christiansen. The car Newman was driving, which Nelson stole, was the one Purvis had commandeered. Agents sent to surround the lodge fell into a ditch in the dark while, unbeknownst to them, Dillinger's gang escaped through rear windows on the second story. Hanni arrived with the tear gas and agents fired the canisters into the house at daybreak, but the only people left were lodge employees and the gangsters' girlfriends.

==== Aftermath ====
This raid would be the FBI's worst failure for the next 59 years. Purvis was targeted for negative public attention, despite the fact that authorities from the St. Paul office had jurisdiction and those agents outranked him. Nevertheless, a petition calling for Purvis's suspension surfaced in the towns around the Little Bohemia Lodge. Inspector Rorer investigated on April 25; he discovered it had been written by two reporters who got a local resident to present it to the area civic organization as a petition calling for an investigation of the civilian deaths.

By May 8, Hoover was told that a former FBI agent, Thomas F. Cullen, was claiming to have heard that the agents that night had locked Clegg, Rorer, and Purvis in a shed, because of how badly the situation was being handled. He asked Assistant Director Harold Nathan to interview all the agents involved. On June 1 Nathan reported that every agent involved positively denied all the rumors. All the Chicago agents denied talking to Cullen. Special Agent in Charge John Mclaughlin said he did not think Clegg, Rorer, Purvis, or Hanni were open enough to the observations and suggestions of agents under them. After this, Hoover put FBI Inspector Samuel P. Cowley on a special assignment to supervise the nationwide manhunt for Dillinger. Cowley was personally responsible for the agents who worked on this case, no matter where they were assigned.

==== Mock trial in pursuit of Dillinger ====
The false lead that sent federal agents to Pennsylvania in pursuit of Dillinger came from a Black man named John Kelly. They brought Kelly to FBI district offices and led Kelly to believe he was on trial in order to scare the truth out of him. Kelly eventually told his story to a Chicago newspaper and by early November someone had inquired about it of Director Hoover. Hoover immediately denied it, but on November 3 he sent a memo to Tamm stating that he had telephoned Purvis to ask him about it. Purvis told him that he had only witnessed Nathan giving Kelly a stern lecture to scare the truth out of him. Purvis said he saw nothing to indicate it was anything more than an interrogation and a lecture. Hoover told Tamm that he informed Purvis that agents are only allowed to interrogate subjects and have no right to make them believe they are on trial. Four days later, Hoover wrote to Purvis that Nathan admitted to the FBI that a mock trial had been held and that Purvis was present. Hoover told Purvis that he was disturbed by the differences in their stories and that activities like that cannot be tolerated under any circumstances in FBI offices.

==== Catching Dillinger ====
Anna Sage, a native of Romania, immigrated to Chicago with her first husband and had a son, but her marriage ended when she began an affair with East Chicago, Indiana police officer Martin Zarkovich. She worked as a prostitute and took over the brothel when the owner died. Because of this, she was being deported as an undesirable alien. When she found out her fellow prostitute Polly Hamilton was dating Dillinger, she called her old boyfriend Zarkovich.

Cowley was in Purvis's office when a call came in from East Chicago Police Captain Timothy O'Neill and Zarkovich on July 21, 1934. The officers met Purvis and Cowley in Cowley's hotel room that night and later continued on to meet Sage. She offered to help catch Dillinger in exchange for being allowed to stay in the country with her son. Purvis told her he had no control over her fate, but he, as Special Agent in Charge of the Chicago office of the Department of Investigation, would recommend she not be deported. He said she could get a financial reward, but he had no control over that either. With faith in the promise of his recommendation, Sage agreed to help and he accepted her offer. She told them that Dillinger liked to go to movies—usually at the Marbro Theater—and she, Hamilton and Dillinger had plans to go the next night.

Cowley ordered all agents to deploy on a moment's notice. He was stationed with a team of agents at the Marbro, when Sage called Purvis in the office and told him Dillinger would be leaving for either the Marbro or the Biograph Theater. Purvis rushed agents there to survey it. Zarkovich Charles B. Winstead joined Cowley at the Marbro, while Purvis took agent Brown to the Biograph. Dillinger arrived at the Biograph with Sage and Hamilton 40 minutes after Purvis did. Brown immediately called Cowley who instructed that the agents there take positions. Five agents were posted close to the entrance: Purvis, Herman Hollis and Brown to the south, and Chicago police officers Glen Stretch and Peter Sopsic to the north. Zarkovich would be directly across the street from the Biograph entrance. O'Neill was across the street and down the block southward at an alley entrance. Cowley was across the street halfway up the block to the north.

In the heat, Dillinger was wearing a straw boater and grey trousers. Purvis thought of arresting him at the ticket window, but decided the risk to the crowd there was too great. Instead he bought a ticket, went into the theater and looked for Dillinger, hoping to arrest him within, but the theater was too crowded. He came back out and chatted with the ticket seller, finding out how long the movie lasted. Purvis went to each agent and relayed that information to them. He also told them to watch for his signals: lighting his cigar on recognizing Dillinger, and waving his hand to indicate the moment to arrest him. Then he stood closest to the theater exit. All the agents waited for two hours. Noticing men loitering in doorways that long, the theater employees thought they were about to be robbed. They phoned the police but a federal agent quietly identified himself to the officers in the arriving squad car and they withdrew. Moviegoers started flowing out of the theater shortly after. Dillinger appeared, flanked by Hamilton and Sage, in a crowd of women and children. Purvis lit his cigar. He waited for the crowd to disperse as Dillinger moved south past him, then he gave the hand signal. Stretch and Sopsic, distracted by a pedestrian talking to them, did not see the signal. Purvis walked to the middle of the sidewalk and repeated it. They still missed it. Special Agents Redmon, Campbell, Winstead and Hollis moved a bit forward to act in their place if necessary. Purvis saw Hamilton give a small tug to Dillinger's shirt as a signal that something was wrong. He saw Dillinger reach into his shirt for a pistol. He tore the buttons off his own jacket in reaching for his gun, but it was agents Hollis, Winstead and Clarence Hurt who shot Dillinger. He fell, mortally wounded, between where special agents Walter, Lackerman and Hurt had been positioned. Two bystanders were shot, one in the thigh and one grazed in the side. Dillinger died on the way to the hospital, so he was taken to a morgue instead, where he was identified by fingerprints and eventually released to his family.

Faithful to his promise, Purvis wrote Hoover asking what could be done for Anna Sage. Hoover replied that it was a State Department matter and they could do nothing. So Purvis released a statement about Anna Sage to the press that read, in part:

She did furnish the information which led to the capture if Dillinger and I, for one, am not ungrateful, and I sincerely believe that some step should be taken, whatever that step may be, to prevent her deportation.

=== Pretty Boy Floyd ===
Hoover had already put Cowley in personal control of all agents involved in investigating the June 1933 Kansas City massacre. In mid-October Special Agent in Charge Purvis and agents under him were in Cincinnati working on a kidnapping case when the Cincinnati FBI office told them that Adam Richetti, one of the perpetrators of the massacre, had been caught in Wellsville Ohio the day before. Purvis got authorization from Cowley in Washington to drop the kidnapping and go to Wellsville to take Richetti into federal custody and pursue his companion, Charles Arthur "Pretty Boy" Floyd.

Floyd had been on the run since his escape when Richetti was captured. On October 22, 1934, he stopped at Elen Conkle's farmhouse asking for food. Not knowing who he was, she fixed him a meal. Afterward, her brother and sister-in-law came in from the fields where they had been working. Floyd asked them for a ride. Their car was parked behind a corn crib and as it began to pull out, Floyd shouted for them to back up because the police were pursuing him. Purvis and his agents had been canvassing the area in search of any trace of Floyd when they came upon the car behind the corn crib. As they pulled up on the other side of the crib, Floyd began to run, zig-zagging across an open field, pistol in hand. When he refused to stop, they opened fire and he dropped dead.

=== Resignation ===
After Purvis became a media figure for killing Dillinger, his high public profile was resented by local law enforcement. He reportedly incurred the wrath of Hoover, who had previously supported him but now supposedly felt overshadowed. Purvis resigned from the FBI in 1935. In a 2005 book co-written by Purvis's son Alston, Hoover is portrayed as jealous of the attention given to Purvis after Dillinger was killed. However, a memo FBI Deputy Associate Director Deke Deloach sent to Administrative Division Assistant Director Jim Mohr the week after Purvis' death referred to a newspaper article that claimed Purvis had quit because he was not promoted to the number 2 or 3 spot in the FBI and that Washington officials quarreled over the vast publicity he received. According to Clyde Tolson, he had never heard the two allegations before. In Hoover's handwriting is the comment, "Someone at Chicago must have talked."

== Career after the FBI ==
After leaving the FBI, Purvis moved to San Francisco where he passed the California bar examination and practiced law for two years. He also began endorsing products including Gillette razors, Dodge cars and Post Toasties. This led to him signing on to host the radio show, "Junior G-man: The Melvin Purvis Club" as a marketing scheme and crusade combating juvenile delinquency. In 1936, Purvis published a memoir of his years as an investigator with the Bureau, entitled American Agent. He had dinner in San Francisco with actor Frederick March, and told March that he might star in a movie with Universal Pictures. In 1937, he moved to Los Angeles, becoming a technical advisor on several films. He dated Jean Harlow briefly and befriended Clark Gable. He became engaged to actress Janice Jarrett, but they never married.

He traveled to Europe in April 1937, shortly after the cancelled wedding. There he met and socialised briefly with Hermann Göring before returning to the US.

In 1938, he settled back in Florence, South Carolina, and on September 14 of that year married his old sweetheart, Marie Rosanne Willcox, daughter of his first law partner. They had three sons. In 1939, he founded the Florence Evening Star and published it until 1941. In 1941 he bought part of WOLS, the local radio station in Florence. His spacious office there was where many members of the public came to meet the famous G-man.

=== Wartime service ===
When the Empire of Japan attacked Pearl Harbor on December 7, 1941, Purvis quickly asked Hoover not to prevent him serving in the Army as an officer. Purvis entered the service as a captain on January 31, 1942. By spring of that year he was serving in Washington in the Office of the Provost Marshal, whose jurisdiction included criminal investigation. He was promoted to major and received Provost Marshal training. He was assigned as executive officer for Brigadier General Joseph V. D. Dillon, Provost Marshal General for the North African Theater. The Provost Marshal focused on black marketeering. Purvis arrived in August 1943 to find that about 20% of American materiel there was stolen and sold illegally, so he spent significant time investigating and apprehending criminal groups.

Purvis also investigated criminal complaints lodged against military personnel. When General George S. Patton slapped two soldiers being treated for PTSD in evacuation hospitals, Purvis was sent to interview him on August 10, 1943, as part of the investigation. This investigation resulted in Patton being demoted to military governor of Sicily.

He was assigned to help organize the War Crimes Division of the War Department. On February 8, 1945, the War Department tasked him with locating high-level Nazis accused of war crimes. He returned to Europe and searched Heidelberg, based on rumors that Adolf Hitler and Martin Bormann were alive and hiding there. Purvis had risen to the rank of colonel by the time he finished his service with the Army in April 1945.

Then, he was appointed Chief American Investigator of War Crimes and assisted in establishing the protocols for the Nuremberg trials. While fulfilling this task, he interviewed Göring in his cell. Göring asked Purvis on the night of October 15, 1946 if he could avoid execution by hanging, and Purvis said no. That night, sometime after this interview, Göring committed suicide by ingesting cyanide.

=== Post-war service ===
When he returned to Florence, he bought out his partner at the radio station, becoming the sole owner. South Carolina senator Olin D. Johnston, chair of the Post Office and Civil Service Subcommittee, asked Purvis to serve as counsel to a subcommittee investigating the federal civil service system for bribery and waste and Purvis began in May 1951 and served until 1953 (The Senate Subcommittee on Manpower Policies was informally known as the Purvis Committee at the time). In mid-September 1958, he accepted Johnston's invitation to serve as counsel to the Senate Judiciary Committee's Subcommittee on Improvements in Judicial Machinery in its task to reform judicial practices and end a logjam of cases.

== Death ==
On February 29, 1960, Purvis was at his home in Florence, South Carolina, when he died from a gunshot wound to the head. His wife, in the yard at the time, found him on the landing of an upstairs hall. The shot was fired from the pistol that was given to him by fellow agents when he resigned from the FBI. That day the Chief Counsel for the US Senate Post Office and Civil Service Committee, a former FBI agent who left the service in 1951, called Assistant FBI Director Robert Wick. He said Purvis had not looked well for weeks and had not eaten since coming down with the flu. Coworkers forced him to take a plane home. He looked ashen in color. He worried that he might have a progressive, degenerative bone disease but he had told the Chief Counsel a few weeks previous that he would never commit suicide because he had too much to live for. The FBI investigated his death and declared it a suicide, although the official coroner's report did not label the cause of death as such. A later investigation suggested that Purvis may have shot himself accidentally while trying to extract a tracer bullet. He was 56 years old.

== Other media ==
=== In documentaries ===
- Purvis was portrayed by Dale Robertson in G-MAN: The Rise and Fall of Melvin Purvis (1974), from SCETV's Carolina Stories documentary series (1974).
- Purvis was portrayed by Scott Brooks in the History Channel documentary on infamous gangsters, Crime Wave: 18 Months of Mayhem (2008).
- Purvis was portrayed by actor Colin Price in the 2016 television series American Lawmen (S1E3): "Melvin Purvis: The Gang Buster" which aired on the American Heroes Channel

=== In films and TV movies ===
- Purvis was portrayed by Ben Johnson in the film Dillinger (1973).
- Melvin Purvis - G-Man is a 1974 American TV movie about Melvin Purvis, starring Dale Robertson.
- He was played by Geoffrey Binney in the TV movie The Story of Pretty Boy Floyd (1974).
- Purvis was portrayed again by Dale Robertson in the TV movie The Kansas City Massacre (1975), a sequel to Melvin Purvis - G-Man.
- He was portrayed by Michael Sacks in the film The Private Files of J. Edgar Hoover (1977).
- He was portrayed by Alan Vint in the film The Lady in Red (1979).
- He was portrayed by Will Patton in the TV movie Dillinger (1991).
- He was portrayed by Dan Cortese in the TV movie Public Enemies (1996).
- Purvis was originally portrayed by Chuck Wagner in the musical Dillinger, Public Enemy Number One (2002).
- Purvis is portrayed by Christian Bale in the film Public Enemies (2009).

=== In games ===
In 1937, Parker Brothers published a game called "Melvin Purvis' 'G'-Men Detective Game."

=== In literature ===
- Purvis appears with Eliot Ness as an agent of the "Federal Bureau of Ideology", in pursuit of labor activist Tom Joad, in Eugene Byrne and Kim Newman's alternate history novel Back in the USSA (1997).
- Purvis is the title character in Denis Johnson's play, Purvis.
- Purvis is a supporting character in the Stephen Hunter book "G-Man".

=== In television ===
- Purvis appeared as himself on the September 24, 1957 episode of the CBS game show To Tell the Truth.
