= Samuel P. Cowley =

American FBI agent (1899–1934)

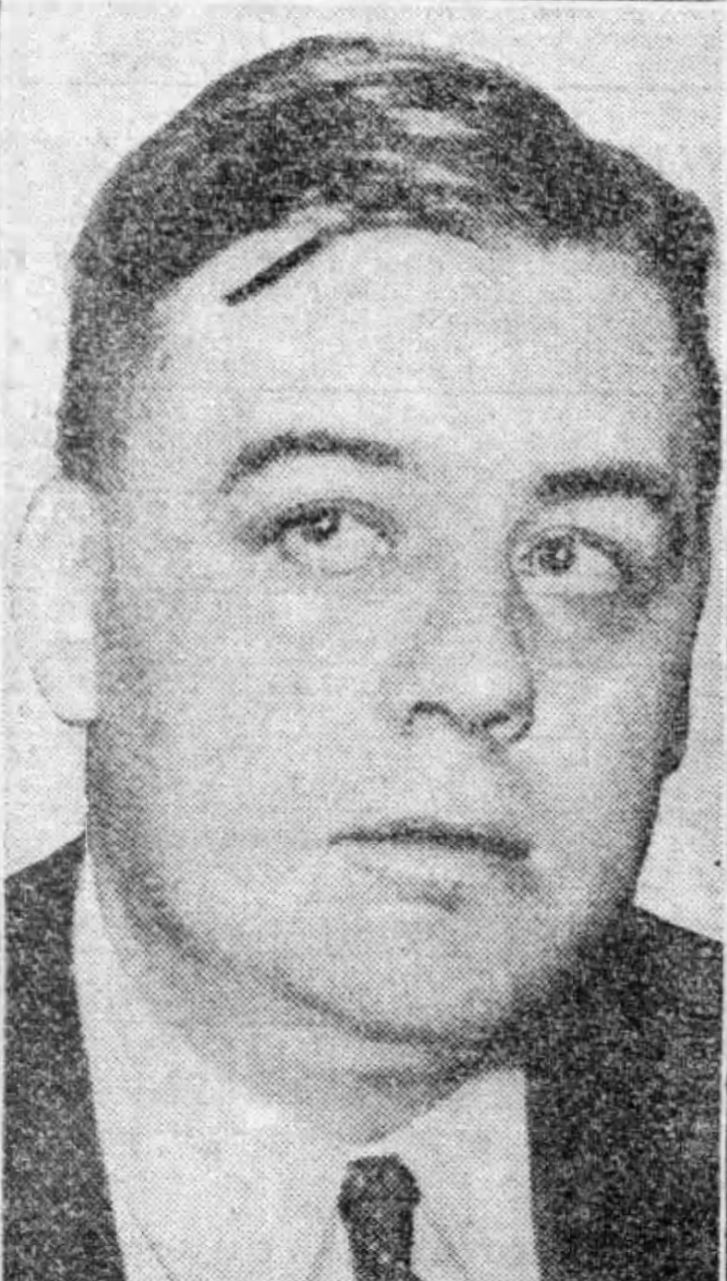
Federal Agent Samuel P. Cowley (Chicago Tribune, 1934)

Samuel Parkinson Cowley (July 23, 1899 – November 28, 1934) was an American federal agent. He was an agent of the Federal Bureau of Investigation (FBI) who was killed in the line of duty in a gunfight with Baby Face Nelson in 1934 on Route 14 in Barrington, Illinois.

Cowley was a son of Matthias F. Cowley, an apostle of the Church of Jesus Christ of Latter-day Saints (LDS Church), by one of his four wives, Luella Parkinson Cowley. He was born in Franklin, Idaho on July 23, 1899. His half-brother, Matthew Cowley (son of Matthias F. and Abbie Hyde Cowley), was also an apostle of the LDS Church. Prior to joining the FBI, Samuel Cowley attended Utah State Agricultural College and George Washington University Law School.

== Role in the Dillinger manhunt ==
In early 1934, Cowley was sent by J. Edgar Hoover (as head of the "Flying Squad") to Chicago specifically to aid the FBI pursuit of John Dillinger. The Chicago Agents initially resented Cowley as a desk jockey who was infringing on their territory and driving them too hard. However, Cowley soon established a reputation as one who drove himself as hard as he drove his agents.

The relationship between Cowley and Melvin Purvis was complex and is debated by historians. Fans of Purvis tend to downplay Cowley, and the official FBI records tend to play down Purvis, as Hoover preferred Cowley. Cowley and Purvis worked together as a team. Individually neither one of them could have caught Dillinger, but together they concentrated on the areas that they knew best: Cowley on gathering intelligence and Purvis working the field. A squad of agents under Cowley worked with East Chicago policemen in tracking down all tips and rumors. It was Cowley who cut the deal with Ana Cumpănaș, the so-called "Woman in Red".

Cowley seems to have understood this relationship. After Purvis's botched raid on Little Bohemia Lodge, Purvis went on a drinking spree, and Cowley hushed it all up. During the Dillinger stakeout, Cowley was in charge of the team at the Marbro Theater, while Purvis' team was at the Biograph Theater. At 8:30 p.m., Sage, Dillinger and Polly Hamilton strolled into the Biograph Theater to see Clark Gable in Manhattan Melodrama. Purvis phoned Cowley, who shifted the other men from the Marbro to the Biograph. Later, after Dillinger was killed, Purvis was in one room, holding a press conference and Cowley was in the next room reporting to Hoover over the phone. Hoover kept telling Cowley to break up the press conference, but Cowley refused.

== Death ==
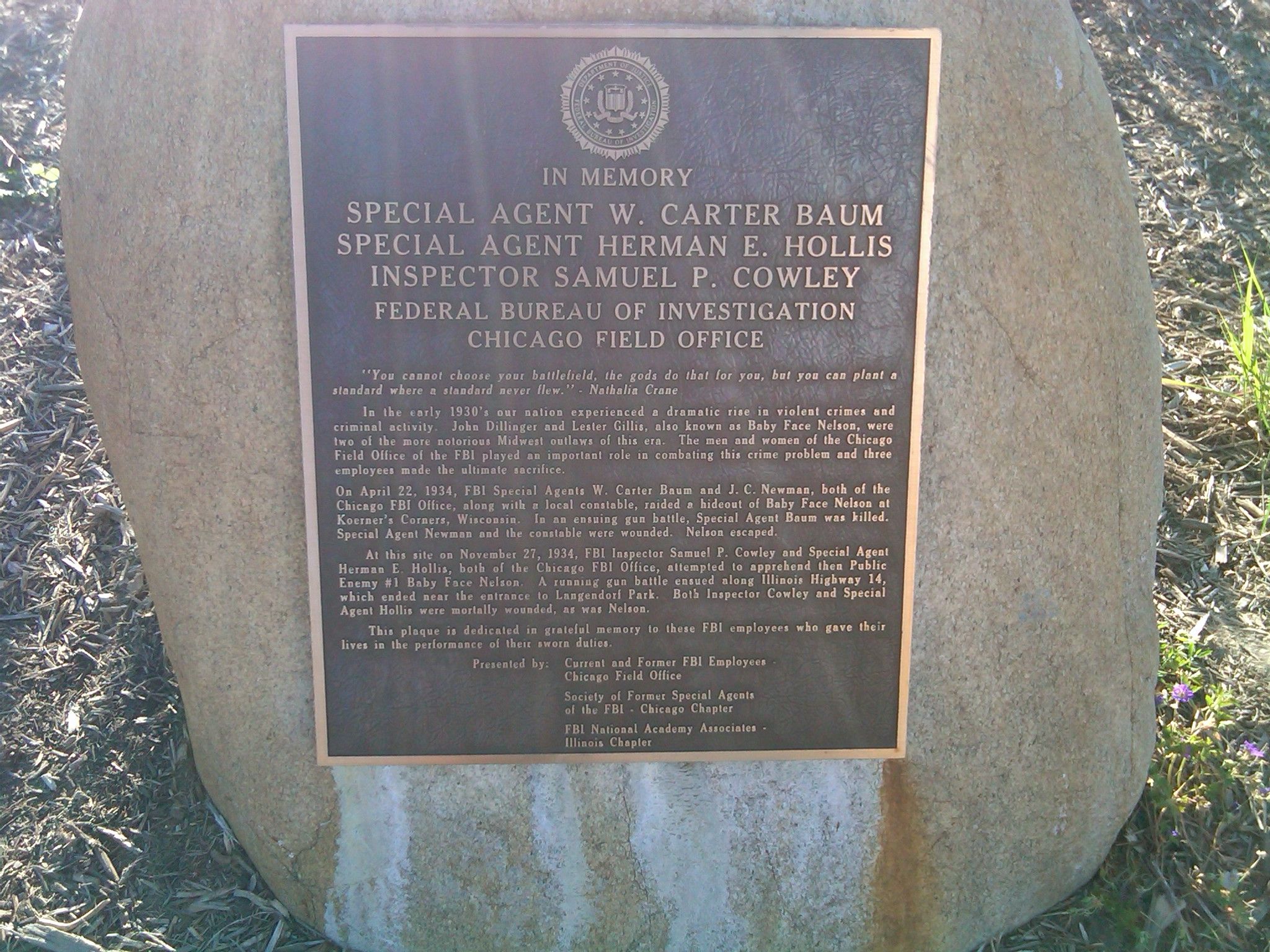
A plaque at the Barrington Park District in Barrington, Illinois commemorates the site of the Battle of Barrington, a 1934 shootout that claimed the lives of FBI agents Cowley and Herman Hollis and resulted in the death of notorious Chicago gangster Baby Face Nelson.

After Dillinger, Cowley was pressed to chase down Lester Gillis (Baby Face Nelson). Near Barrington, Illinois (northwest of Chicago) Nelson began chasing a car with two FBI agents (who were only lightly armed). One of the agents put a bullet through the radiator of Nelson's car. Cowley and another agent, Herman Hollis, arrived in another car and engaged in a shootout with Nelson. Cowley was armed with a sub machine gun and Hollis had a shotgun. Nelson, although repeatedly shot by Cowley and Hollis, walked across the road and shot both agents with his rifle.

Hollis was killed instantly when a bullet hit him in the face, but Cowley survived long enough to identify Nelson and his companions to Purvis. He died at 2:00 AM, about ten hours after the shootout. Nelson's body was found the next day, wrapped in a blanket, stripped naked, and dumped in a ditch in Skokie.

The media always played up Purvis and relegated Cowley to a minor role. The official FBI accounts play up Cowley and minimize Purvis. Both men played critically important parts in ending the Midwest crime spree started by the Dillinger gang.

== In popular culture ==
Cowley is played by Roy Jenson in John Milius's 1973 film Dillinger, by Steve Kanaly in Melvin Purvis - G-Man, by John Karlen in The Kansas City Massacre, and by Richard Short in Michael Mann's 2009 film Public Enemies.
