= Lincoln National Bank robbery =

1930 bank robbery in Lincoln, Nebraska

- Date: September 17, 1930
- Time: Started at 10:02 a.m. (CST)
- Location: Lincoln National Bank, Lincoln, Nebraska, US
- Type: Bank robbery
- Perpetrator: 6 to 9 men
- Arrests: 3
- Convicted: 2

The Lincoln National Bank robbery took place on September 17, 1930 when a group of armed men entered a bank in Lincoln, Nebraska, stole approximately $2.7 million in cash and securities, and then fled with help of a getaway driver. No one was hurt badly during the robbery. The majority of the money was never recovered.

It was the biggest heist in the United States until the Great Brink's Robbery twenty years later.

== Robbery ==
A stolen Buick Master Six sedan with Iowa license plates stopped at 10:02 a.m. on September 17, 1930 in front of the Lincoln National Bank & Trust Company building, located at the intersection of 12th and O Streets in downtown Lincoln. Five or six men (accounts vary) dressed in dark business suits got out of the car, leaving a driver behind the wheel with the engine still running. One man stationed himself in front of the bank. Four or five entered the bank, one staying just within the threshold as the other three conducted the robbery. All the men were armed. None wore a mask.

The robbers forced people inside of the bank to lay down on the floor. One collected the people downstairs and moved them at gunpoint to the main floor. The robbers demanded to speak to assistant cashier H. E. Leinberger, seemingly aware that only he had the ability to open the bank vault door. Leinberger was not present, but it was discovered that the vault door's time-controlled locking mechanism had not been set correctly, allowing access. The men collected cash, silver, and securities from the vault and from bank teller cages into pillowcases.

A customer, Hugh Werner, arrived at the bank's entrance but immediately left when she saw the robbery in progress. She went across the street to a radio store and told an employee there to call the police. Two officers were able to reach the bank while the robbery was in progress. Only one of officers was armed, with a revolver. They felt they were no match for the man posted in front of the bank, who had a machine gun. The robber gestured with his automatic weapon to indicate the police should leave, which they did.

The robbers bullied passersby with their firearms as the pillowcases of money were loaded into the Buick. Authorities were not able to track the car when they drove away.

== Perpetrators ==
Edward Doll, interrogated for a week by several FBI agents after his capture near St. Petersburg, Florida, on February 14, 1934, confessed to his role in the robbery and said six others participated in the crime. According to an FBI memo dated February 23, 1934, Doll (named in the memo under two aliases, Edward La Rue and Eddie Foley) said he spent months helping plan the robbery. His role during the crime was to empty the contents of three safes into four laundry bags. He described other perpetrators and their roles as follows:

Big Homer Wilson: Also known as Big Jim, Charlie Potatoes, Charlie Stone and Big Moose, Doll described Wilson as a good friend of Al Capone. Wilson's role was to guard the door of the bank, but Doll implied Wilson hadn't fulfilled that role.

Edward Bentz: Also known as Ned R. Dewey, Bentz had lived in Seattle, Washington for a time, Doll said, where he'd run into trouble with the police on multiple occasions. During the Lincoln Bank robbery, Bentz’ grabbed cash from the tellers’ cages and used a revolver to warn off spectators as the gang made their getaway.

Gus Stone: Doll said Stone was a native of North or South Carolina but had lived in Chicago. He knew Frank Nash and Gus Winkler, and may have been involved in the Kansas City Massacre. Doll said Stone may have operated a slot machine racket with Gus Winkler in Chicago before he killed him for reasons not mentioned in the memo. He wielded the only machine gun during the robbery of Lincoln National, which he used during the robbery of the bank's customers and at one point to threaten the people gathering outside the bank.

Big Slim: Doll provided only this robber's gang name and said he was killed by gangsters at Redwing, Minnesota, about a year prior to Doll's arrest. Slim drove the car and stayed in it during the robbery.

Old Charlie: A Chicago hoodlum with a long criminal record, Doll was unable or unwilling to provide his true name, but said he was known to Harvey Bailey and possibly George "Machine Gun" Kelly, Kathryn Kelly and "George Bates" (Most likely Doll was referring to career criminal Albert Bates). After robbing the bank's customers, he helped Doll empty the safes.

Doll refused to name one of the robbery participants, referring to him only as “One Shorty” or just “Shorty,” and saying he robbed the bank customers.

== Distribution of Proceeds ==
On the drive to Chicago after the robbery, Doll reported to the FBI in his February 1934 statement, they stopped in Kansas and counted out $42,000 in cash, which they split seven ways, meaning each robber got $6,000 in cash, worth more than $100,000 in 2023 dollars. They burned the documents they saw as worthless, including mortgages and deeds, and put some of the paper in an inner tube, but were unable to find it when they searched the area later on. They kept $700,000 in stocks and bonds, including about $55,000 in Liberty bonds.

The Liberty Bonds, Doll told the FBI, were sold to Dewey Berlovich, a road contractor in Des Moines, Iowa. According to the memo, “Berlovich sold $15,000 worth of the bonds in Des Moines Iowa, paying (Doll) eight-two (82) percent of their face value. Berlovich also disposed of $1,000 worth of the bonds in Saint Paul, Minnesota, in the same manner and attempted to sell $14,000 worth of the bonds at Chicago, Illinois, where he was arrested with the bonds in his possession.”

Doll corroborated some of the details from other sources of what happened to a portion of the bonds, telling the FBI that Gus Winkler was arrested in Buffalo, New York, and charged with the Lincoln National Bank robbery, after which the “Capone Syndicate” worked with Doll's gang to get some of the bonds back as part of a deal to keep Winkler from going to trial in Nebraska. The Syndicate paid $21,000 in total to Doll's gang for the bonds, as well as $10,000 to a Nebraska prosecutor and $10,000 to an investigator with the Secret Six, a Chicago crime-fighting group, for their help with the deal.

The value of the bonds Winkler helped recover was estimated at $600,000.

== Arrests and Convictions ==
Thomas "Pat" O'Connor, Howard "Pop" Lee, and John "Jack" Britts were eventually arrested for the crime. O'Connor and Lee were found guilty, but Britts was not. Berlovich was able to prove he wasn't involved in the robbery and was let go.

In his February 1934 statement to the FBI, Doll insisted no one charged or sentenced in the robbery to date had been involved in it.

Doll himself was convicted of other crimes and served decades in prison but was never charged with this holdup.
