= Federal Prison Camp, Alderson =

Women-only prison in West Virginia, US

Coordinates: 37°43′25″N 80°40′04″W

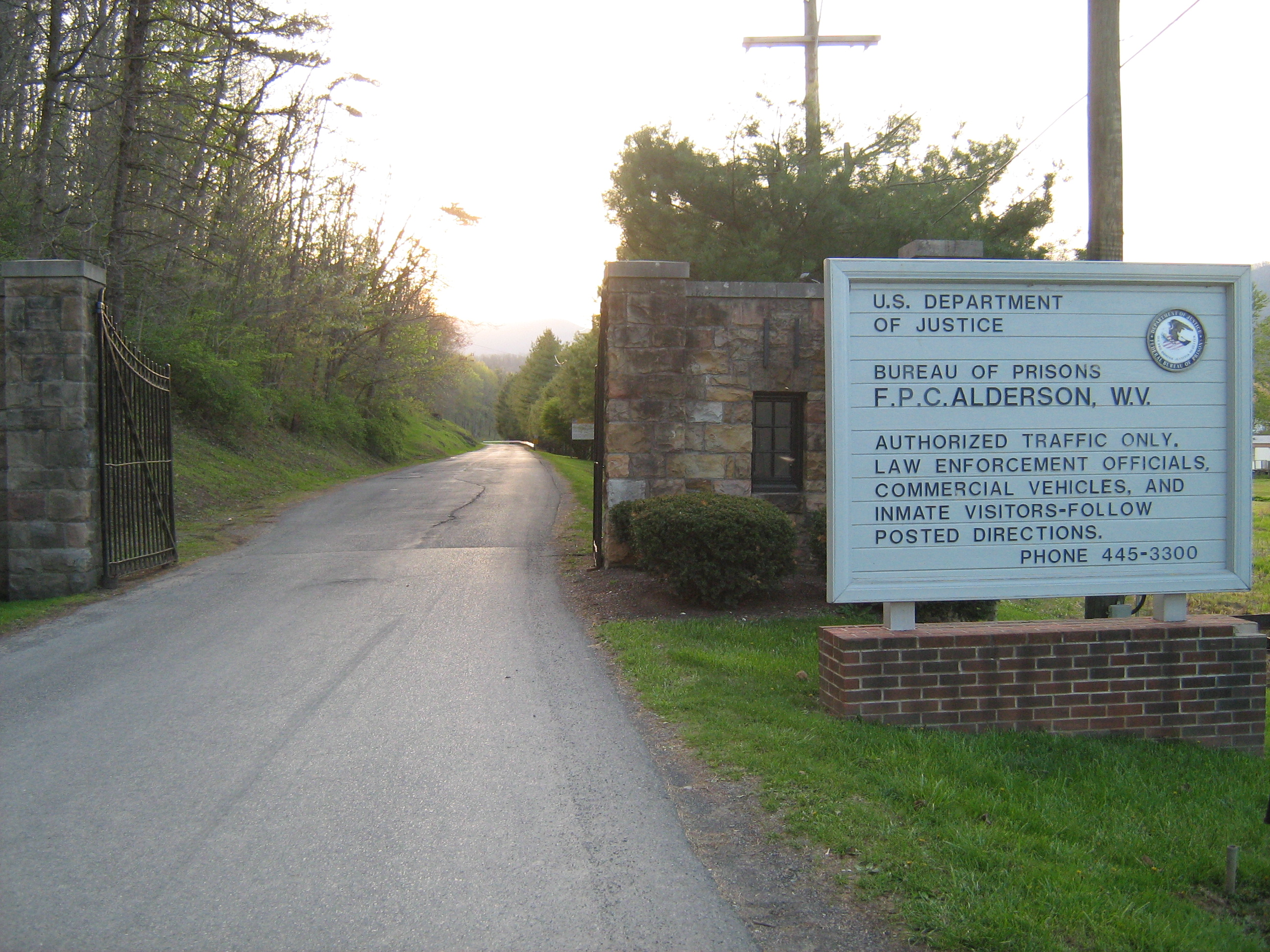
- Interactive map of Federal Prison Camp, Alderson
- Location: Monroe and Summers Counties, West Virginia
- Status: Operational
- Security class: Minimum-security
- Population: 667
- Opened: 1928
- Managed by: Federal Bureau of Prisons
- Warden: M. M. Lefever
- Website: Official website

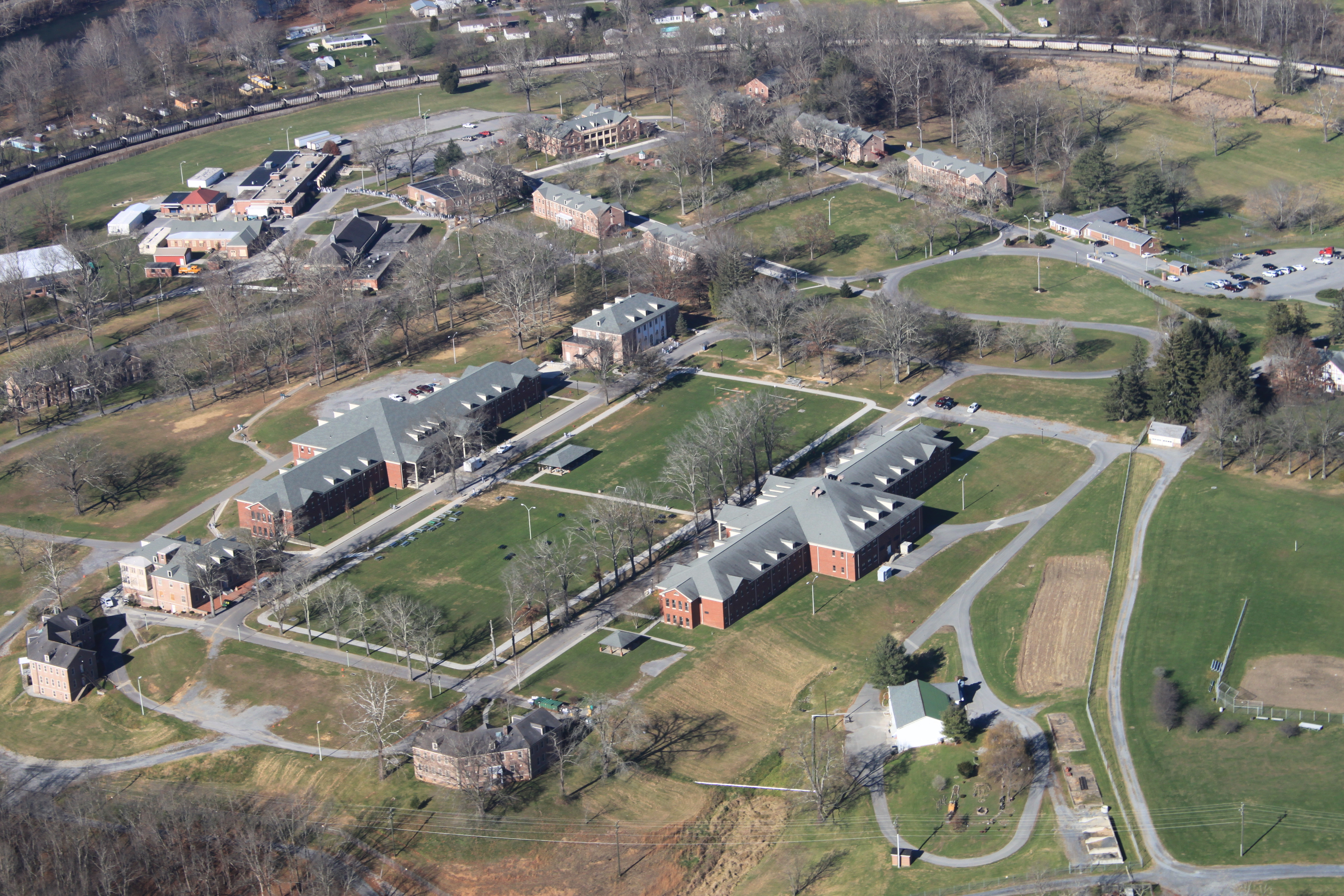
Aerial view

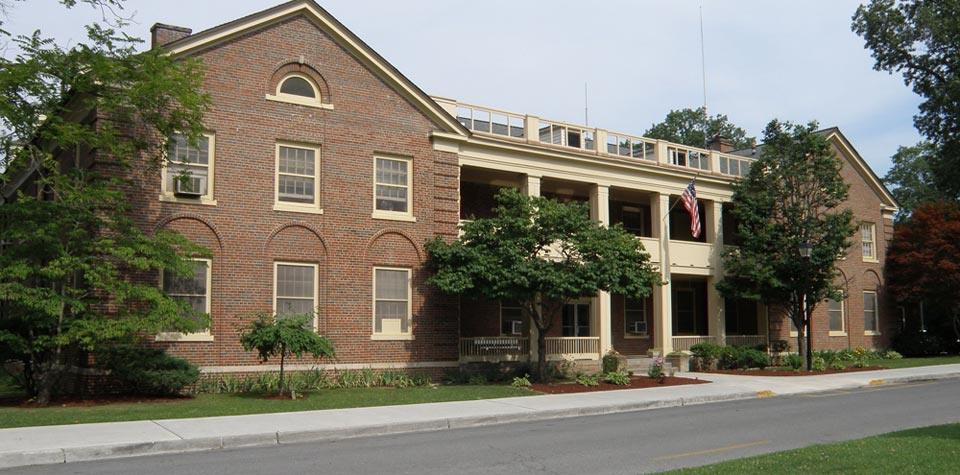
Administration building

The Federal Prison Camp, Alderson (FPC Alderson) is a minimum-security United States federal prison for female inmates in West Virginia. It is operated by the Federal Bureau of Prisons, a division of the United States Department of Justice.

FPC Alderson is in two West Virginia counties, near the town of Alderson. A portion of the prison is in unincorporated Monroe County, while the other portion of the prison, including the dormitories, is in unincorporated Summers County. The majority of the prison is in Summers County. Four other area towns, Hinton, Lewisburg, Ronceverte, and White Sulphur Springs, are within commuting distance of FPC Alderson.

== History ==
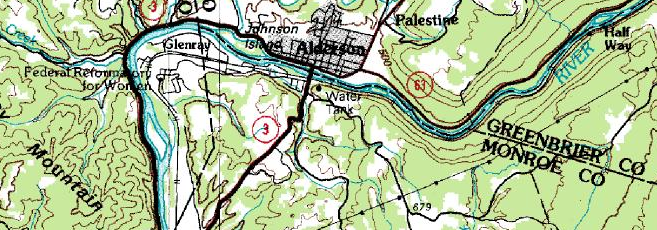
Topographic map, U.S. Geological Survey, July 1, 1983

In the 1920s, there was a shortage of federal prison space for female inmates. Women offenders either were given alternative punishments or were housed alone within all-male institutions. Prison staff and fellow inmates sexually exploited girls and women who were incarcerated in these facilities.

Mabel Walker Willebrandt, then an Assistant U.S. Attorney General, first encouraged establishment of a facility for women. FPC Alderson, which opened on April 30, 1927, as the Federal Industrial Institute for Women, was the first federal women's prison in the United States. It was opened during a reform movement in the 1920s to help reform female offenders.

The first warden, Mary B. Harris, was chosen by Willebrandt. Despite later bureau mythology that Alderson opened its doors with moonshining women from the hills of West Virginia, 174 women had been sent to the facility in the first year of operation before its formal November 14, 1928, opening. The West Virginia location was chosen as it was remote enough from major population centers to reduce potential escapes, while it was reasonably close to the U.S. capital. The vast majority of the women were imprisoned for drug and alcohol charges imposed during the Prohibition era.

Esther Heffernan, a sociology professor at Edgewood College, said that throughout history the inmates included "relatives of famous mobsters and grandmotherly women who embezzled money from banks. You've had a real mixture." Hefferman added that in Alderson, which was a "not undesirable" place to be confined, the isolation from urban life could be stressful for inmates. She said that the inmates, "Coming from the streets of New York and D.C.", were awakened at night by crickets and frogs.

Most of the inmates at FPC Alderson have been convicted of non-violent or white-collar crime. Many are in the drug program and have come from other prisons to attend the program at Alderson.

== Facility ==
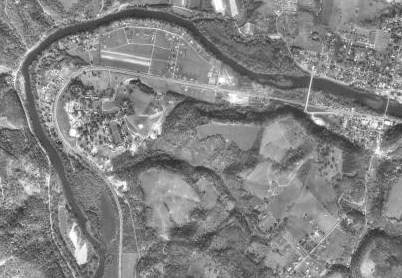
Aerial view, USGS, October 27, 1990

FPC Alderson is a 159-acre (64 ha) facility and is the largest employer in the Alderson, West Virginia area. The prison is about a five-hour driving distance from Washington, D.C.

Serving as a model for prison reform at the time, the facility was styled after a boarding school, offering education with no armed guards. The facility followed a reformatory model with no fenced grounds. The prison consisted of primarily work-oriented facilities designed for minor federal offenders. It originally consisted of 14 cottages built in a horseshoe pattern on two-tiered slopes. The offenders were segregated by race in the cottages and each building contained a kitchen and rooms for about 30 women.

While there is no barbed wire on the fence surrounding the camp, the prisoners have schedules and each one must work. Inmates get holidays off except those who work in the powerhouse and kitchen. From its beginning, Alderson's staff members have maintained a focus on vocational training and personal growth experiences, with craft-shop activities an integral part of vocational training.

Free time is spent walking around the sidewalk that is set between the two dorms as this is within bounds for the inmates. Since 2004, inmates are no longer free to roam the entire campus and are restricted in areas of the prison. They also play recreational activities such as volleyball.

John Benish, the former co-manager of the Alderson Hospitality House, a hospitality establishment where families of Alderson inmates stay when visiting, said that FPC Alderson is "built like a college campus. There is lot of property, a lot of greenery and there is no barbed wire around."

The Alderson facility includes two dormitories with 500 inmates each. Inmates live in two-person cubicles instead of traditional barred prison cells, and sleep in bunk beds. The cubicles are 5-by-9-foot (1.5 m × 2.7 m), separated by cinder-blocks.

The prison was nicknamed "Camp Cupcake" by members of the news media when Martha Stewart was sentenced to a five-month term there and was referred to as "Yale" by Stewart herself. Local residents have also referred to it as "the college campus".

By 2004, according to Alexandra Marks of The Independent, the operating model for Alderson followed "a punitive rather than a rehabilitative model". As of 2004, most prisoners at Alderson were convicted of recreational drug-related offenses. Prisoners are not permitted to patronize Alderson-area businesses.

The facility allows weekend visits, but special hours are available for holidays. In prior years the families of inmates were allowed past visiting rooms only on Thanksgiving Day when they could also share in a holiday feast for $1.75.

FPC Alderson was one of six federal and state prisons participating in the Paws4prisons service dog training program. This program allowed inmates the opportunity to interact and work with dogs. This included an academic curriculum where inmates first learned how to train "shelter-rescue dogs" and then progressed to developing highly trained assistance dogs.

== Notable inmates (current and former) ==
=== Violent criminals ===
Inmate name	Register number	Photo	Status	Details
Lolita Lebrón	22167-069		Sentence commuted by President Jimmy Carter in 1979; served 25 years.	Member of a group of Puerto Rican nationalists who opened fire inside the U.S. House of Representatives in 1954, wounding five Congressmen; served additional prison time in 2001 for trespassing on military property for protesting the U.S. Navy presence on the Puerto Rican island of Vieques.
Margaret Waley	Unlisted (Note: Inmates released from custody prior to 1982 are not listed on the Federal Bureau of Prisons website.)		Released from custody in 1948 after serving 14 years.	Convicted in 1935 of kidnapping and conspiracy for her role as an accomplice in the kidnapping of George Weyerhaeuser.
Kathryn Kelly	Unlisted		Released from custody in 1958 after serving 25 years.	Wife of notorious bank robber and murderer George Kelly Barnes, better known as "Machine Gun Kelly"; convicted in 1933 of being her husband's accomplice in the kidnapping of businessman and oil tycoon Charles F. Urschel.
Lynette Fromme	06075-180		Spent the majority of her sentence at FPC Alderson; released in 2009 after serving 34 years.	Follower of cult leader and serial killer Charles Manson; attempted to assassinate U.S. President Gerald Ford on September 5, 1975; known by the nickname "Squeaky".
Sara Jane Moore	04851-180		Imprisoned 1975–1978, in 1979 she escaped and was recaptured hours later; released in 2007, after serving 32 years.	Attempted to assassinate U.S. President Gerald Ford on September 22, 1975.

=== Espionage, Smith Act and "Supporting the Enemy in Wartime" prisoners ===
Inmate name	Register number	Photo	Status	Details
Velvalee Dickinson	Unlisted (Note: Inmates released from custody prior to 1982 are not listed on the Federal Bureau of Prisons website.)		Imprisoned 1944–1951	American convicted of espionage against the United States on behalf of Japan.
Iva Toguri D'Aquino	Unlisted		Was held in FPC, Alderson	American citizen that Japanese forces made participate in English-language propaganda broadcast transmitted by Radio Tokyo to Allied soldiers in the South Pacific during World War II; known as "Tokyo Rose".
Mildred Gillars	Unlisted		Imprisoned 1950–1956	American who supplied propaganda broadcasts for Nazi Germany; known as "Axis Sally".
Elizabeth Gurley Flynn	Unlisted		Imprisoned 1955–1957	American leftist leader and co-founder of American Civil Liberties Union (ACLU), a Smith Act prisoner
Claudia Jones	Unlisted		Imprisoned 1955–1957	Trinidadian-born child-immigrant journalist and National Executive member of the Communist Party of the United States, a Smith Act prisoner. After release, deported to the United Kingdom, founded the Notting Hill Carnival

=== Corrupt public officials ===
Inmate name	Register number	Status	Details
Monica Conyers	43693-039	Released from custody on May 16, 2013, after serving 3 years.	Detroit City Council member from 2005 to 2009 and wife of former-Congressman John Conyers; pleaded guilty to bribery in 2009 for accepting $6,000 from a waste management company in return for her helping the company win a $1.2 billion contract with the city.
Meg Scott Phipps	23786-056	Released from custody in 2007 after serving 3 years.	North Carolina Agriculture Commissioner from 2001 to 2003; pleaded guilty in 2003 to extortion, mail fraud, and conspiracy for accepting thousands of dollars in illegal cash payments, falsifying campaign finance reports, and extorting money from carnival operators with the promise of state contracts.

=== Financial criminals ===
Inmate name	Register number	Photo	Status	Details
Martha Stewart	55170-054		Released from custody in 2005 after serving 5 months.	American business magnate, television host, author, and magazine publisher; convicted in 2004 of obstruction of justice and lying to federal prosecutors investigating insider trading.
Esther Reed	40024-424		Released from custody in 2011 after serving 3 years.	Former U.S. Secret Service Most-Wanted Fugitive; pleaded guilty to fraud and identity theft for falsely assuming several identities, including that of missing person Brooke Henson, in order to steal money and gain entrance to Ivy League universities; Reed was featured on the television program America's Most Wanted.
Diane Hathaway	48069-039		Released from custody in 2014 after serving 366 days.	Former Michigan Supreme Court Justice convicted of mortgage fraud.

=== Others ===
Inmate name	Register number	Photo	Status	Details
Billie Holiday	Unlisted (Note: Inmates released from custody prior to 1982 are not listed on the Federal Bureau of Prisons website.)		Imprisoned 1947–48	American jazz singer and songwriter arrested for possession of narcotics on May 19, 1947, and sentenced to serve a year and a day, but released for good behavior on March 16, 1948.

== See also ==
- Incarceration in the United States
- List of U.S. federal prisons
