= Kidnapping of Howard Woolverton =

American kidnapping case

Howard Woolverton
- Born: September 26, 1880; South Bend, Indiana
- Died: January 27, 1960; South Bend, Indiana
- Occupations: manufacturer, banker
- Known for: kidnap victim

The kidnapping of Howard Woolverton, which began in South Bend, Indiana, the evening of January 26, 1932, and concluded when Woolverton returned to his home unharmed about 24 hours later, received extensive contemporary newspaper coverage, impacted the way the press covered kidnapping in the following weeks, and played a leading role in passage of the Federal Kidnapping Act later that year.

FBI Director J. Edgar Hoover attributed the crime to George "Machine Gun" Kelly, Kelly's wife Kathryn Kelly, and Edward Doll.

At the time of the kidnapping, Woolverton was secretary and treasurer of the Malleable Steel Range Manufacturing Company, based in South Bend, Indiana. The firm, founded by his father, Jacob Woolverton, lives on as Southbend, a division of the Middleby Corporation.

== Kidnapping details ==
According to extensive newspaper coverage at the time, Howard Woolverton and his wife, Florence Flannery Woolverton, had gone to the theater with close family friend Bessie Studebaker on the evening of January 26, 1932. After the movie, they drove to the mansion of Mrs. Studebaker, a member by marriage of the family that founded the Studebaker company. At about 11 p.m. on that date, while the Woolvertons were driving back to their own home a few blocks away, a car skidded to a stop next to them (or blocked their path, according to some reports) while simultaneously a male pedestrian jumped on the running board of Woolverton's five-seat Pierce-Arrow automobile, pointed a gun through the car's slightly open window, and demanded to be let into the back seat. Once in the Woolvertons' car, the man ordered Woolverton to drive as instructed. As they drove, a second car followed. Woolverton was ordered to stop in a remote area a few miles west of South Bend and was informed that he was being kidnapped for $50,000 (an amount equal to about $2 million in 2020 dollars). Mrs. Woolverton was given a ransom note and told to drive her husband's car back to South Bend to collect the money, while Mr. Woolverton was ordered into the kidnappers' car. He was forced to put on painted goggles, and he was driven further west, where he was held overnight in an unknown location. The farmhouse has never been found.

Mrs. Woolverton returned to South Bend in her husband's car and immediately reported to police that her husband had been kidnapped, and by the next morning, the press had been notified. The story received front-page coverage in newspapers across the region published on January 27, 1932, including the evening editions of The South Bend Tribune, the South Bend News-Times, and the Chicago Tribune. Hundreds more papers throughout the United States, including the New York Times, ran wire reports of the crime.

Woolverton negotiated the ransom down to $8,000, which he agreed to pay in accordance with further instructions. The kidnappers dropped Woolverton off in Chicago, and he traveled by train from there back to South Bend.

== Investigation ==
Once home, Woolverton refused to speak to the press, providing an incomplete account of his abduction through his attorney, G. A. Farabaugh, who claimed Woolverton was blinded throughout his ordeal, never heard his kidnappers' voices and could say nothing about who abducted him. Claiming to be under orders of the kidnappers not to talk, further, Woolverton was similarly reticent with law enforcement officials. His silence and his friendship with Frank Mayr Jr., Indiana Secretary of State and head of the Indiana state police, virtually quashed any investigation of the crime, with state officials declaring that if Woolverton wouldn't talk, they could do nothing more.

== Impact ==
Despite the absence of an investigation or much information about the kidnapping, the crime revived discussion of the Federal Kidnapping Act in Congress. The act, which would make the transporting of kidnap victims over state lines a federal crime, with punishments including the death penalty, had been proposed in December 1931 and quickly tabled, with opposition based on both budgetary and states' rights concerns. The law, passed in summer 1932, is typically called the "Lindbergh Law", with credit for its passage attributed solely to its namesake, Charles Augustus Lindbergh Jr.

Woolverton's kidnapping featured prominently in several newspaper series researched and prepared in the weeks following his abduction, and were quite possibly inspired by it. Two such projects, by Bruce Catton of the Newspaper Enterprise Association and Fred Pasley of the Daily News of New York City, were ready for publication within a day or two of the Lindbergh kidnapping. Both series, which ran in papers across North America, offered statistics, histories and noteworthy cases (particularly the Lindbergh case), and described kidnapping as an existential threat to American life, a singular, growing crime wave in which no one was safe. Pasley labeled Woolverton's kidnapping a "spectacular" crime that "climaxed a series of such crimes in the Middle West" and "which for brazen audacity has no parallel." Catton's article included pictures of Mr. and Mrs. Woolverton and asserted that "The amazing way in which kidnapping has become a major underworld industry is nowhere better shown than in the events of the past few months in the middle-west," adding, "The seizure of Woolverton . . . is evidence of this."

== Perpetrators ==
In articles published in the American Magazine in February and August 1937, and in his 1938 book Persons in Hiding, FBI Director J. Edgar Hoover claimed that George "Machine Gun" Kelly, Kelly's wife Kathryn Kelly, and Edward Doll, aka Eddie LaRue, had kidnapped a wealthy businessman in South Bend. While Hoover did not name Woolverton in the articles or book, it was clear to media at the time that he was referring to Woolverton. Following publication of the February 1937 article, The South Bend Tribune telegrammed Hoover asking for more information about his allegations. Hoover replied with a telegram a few days later, stating, "I regret that the confidential nature of the information in our files makes it impossible to disclose further information with respect to the Woolverton kidnapping."

In his 1934 federal statement, further, Woolverton acknowledged being advised by the FBI "that it is absolutely necessary that the investigation of this matter be held in strict confidence and I have advised my relatives to keep this matter quiet and not to divulge any information to anybody concerning this investigation."

Neither Doll and the Kellys nor anyone else was ever charged with Woolverton's kidnapping, but by the mid-1930s, all three were serving life sentences for other crimes.

Because initial news reports were stymied by Woolverton's reticence, and Hoover declined to name the victim in his accounts of the crime, or provide further details to the press, the kidnapping of Howard Woolverton was virtually forgotten over the ensuing decades despite its initial prominence.
