= Willie Carter Sharpe =

Bootlegger in Virginia, USA

Willie Carter Sharpe was a rum runner in Virginia during the prohibition of alcohol.

== Early life ==
Sharpe was raised in a small mountain town, gaining employment in a cotton mill during her childhood.

== Criminal career ==
Sharpe had been arrested 13 times between 1921 and 1932 for driving offences. She began piloting bootleg runs in 1926; leading convoys of bootleggers transporting illicit spirits through Franklin County, Virginia, as well as serving as a 'blocker'; hindering police attempts to intercept the convoys.

Sharpe reportedly became one of the best-known rum runners in Virginia, having involvement in the movement of somewhere between 79,000 and 200,000 gallons of illicit liquor. In 1932, Sharpe commenced a 3-year sentence in the Alderson Reformatory for Women for violations of the National Prohibition Act.

Sharpe testified at a federal grand jury investigating illicit liquor smuggling in Franklin county in November 1934, and in 1935 testified as a witness in the trials of 34 persons accused of illicit liquor offences. Prior to the commencement of the trial, Sharpe was arrested in St Louis as a material witness.

Following the 1935 trial, twenty of the accused were found guilty, three were acquitted, and eleven did not contest the allegations. Sharpe's reliability as a witness was disputed during the trial.

Samuel O. White, the federal agent whom arrested Sharpe and accepted a $50 reward for doing so, subsequently faced prosecution for accepting this gratuity.

== Personal life ==
Sharpe was married to Floyd Carter, the son of a bootlegger. They were divorced in 1925.

Sharpe achieved some notoriety for a diamond dental filling.
