= Eddie Bentz =

American bank robber (1894–1979)

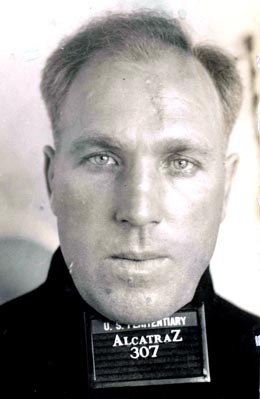
- BOP mugshot, 1936
- Born: June 2, 1894; Pipestone, Minnesota, U.S.
- Died: October 31, 1979 (aged 85); Tacoma, Washington, U.S.
- Occupation: Bank robber
- Status: Paroled from Alcatraz in 1948
- Conviction: Armed robbery
- Penalty: 20 years' imprisonment

Edward Wilhelm Bentz (June 2, 1894 – October 31, 1979) was an American bank robber and Depression-era outlaw. He was associated with several high-profile public enemies during his criminal career, including Harvey Bailey, Albert Bates, George "Machine Gun" Kelly and Baby Face Nelson. He was eventually captured by the FBI and sentenced to Alcatraz.

== Biography ==
Little information is known of his early life; however, most accounts agree that Eddie Bentz was born in Pipestone, Minnesota (or South Dakota) on June 2, 1894. His father was supposedly killed by a runaway horse when he was a child and his family later moved to Tacoma, Washington. Bentz spent much of his youth in juvenile reformatories for burglary and later began safe-cracking and armed robbery by his early 20s. According to crime historian William Helmer, Bentz participated in over 150 robberies across the U.S. "without ever being named or indicted"; however, Helmer has never provided verifiable evidence for his claims. Bentz became extremely successful as a bank robber—meticulously planning each of his exploits—and lived an extravagant lifestyle collecting rare books and coins. He was also known as a meticulous planner and well known for charting escape routes.

He and Harvey Bailey were the prime suspects in the infamous bank robbery of $2,870,000 in Lincoln, Nebraska on September 17, 1930, although neither was ever charged for that robbery. During 1932, he began teaming with Albert Bates and George "Machine Gun" Kelly, robbing a bank in Ponder, Texas on July 31 and another in Colfax, Washington on September 21, taking $70,000 in cash and bonds. The robberies were wrongly attributed to Bonnie and Clyde and Pretty Boy Floyd, respectively.

Eight days after the Colfax robbery, Bentz and several unidentified accomplices raided another bank in Holland, Michigan. Bentz went into semi-retirement after that job and was living in Long Beach, Indiana, when he was approached in 1933 by George "Baby Face" Nelson to join him and his gang in planning the robbery of a bank in Grand Haven, Michigan. Bentz agreed, and the getaway driver fled on the day of the robbery, stranding Bentz, Nelson and the others. One of the robbers, Eddie Doyle, was arrested; however, the rest of the robbers managed to escape in a second waiting car with $30,000. John Dillinger was widely speculated to have been one of the participants; however, historical evidence indicates he was involved in bank heists on his own in Indiana and Ohio at the time of the robbery.

In spite of the federal government placing most bank robberies under federal jurisdiction, which consequently would involve the FBI's hunting down many Depression-era outlaws, Bentz remained a fugitive. On July 4, 1934, he and several unidentified accomplices robbed a bank in Danville, Vermont but escaped with only $8,500. It is unclear if that was the last robbery Bentz participated in, but he was not identified in any other hold-ups after the Danville robbery.

Bentz was eventually tracked down to an address in Brooklyn, New York and arrested by federal agents on March 13, 1936, finding him hiding in a dumbwaiter. Taken into custody, he refused to name his accomplices in the Danville robbery and was sentenced to 20 years' imprisonment. At the time of his sentencing, Bentz asked to be sent to Alcatraz, supposedly stating to the judge that "all my friends are there". He was eventually paroled from Alcatraz in 1948 and returned to his hometown in Tacoma where he died of a heart attack on October 31, 1979.

== Cited works and further reading ==
- Breuer, William B. (2008). J. Edgar Hoover and His G-men. Connecticut: Praeger Publishing. ISBN 978-0-275-94990-7.
- Newton, Michael (2002). The Encyclopedia of Robberies, Heists, and Capers. New York: Facts On File Inc. ISBN 0-816-04488-0.
- Underhill, Robert (2015). Criminals and Folk Heroes. New York City: Algora Publishing. ISBN 978-1-628-94140-1.
