= United States Post Office, Courthouse, and Federal Office Building (Oklahoma City) =

Historic building in Oklahoma, United States

- Post Office, Courthouse, and Federal Office Building
- U.S. National Register of Historic Places
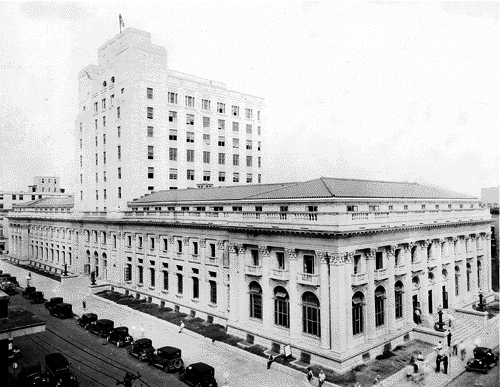
- U.S. Post Office and Courthouse

- Location within Oklahoma Location within the United States
- Location: 215 Dean A McGee Ave., Oklahoma City, Oklahoma
- Coordinates: 35°28′16″N 97°31′1″W
- Area: 2 acres (0.81 ha)
- Built: 1912
- Architect: James Knox Taylor
- Architectural style: Beaux Arts, Moderne
- NRHP reference No.: 74001665
- Added to NRHP: August 30, 1974

The United States Post Office and Courthouse, Oklahoma City, Oklahoma is a historic post office, courthouse, and Federal office building built in 1912 and located at Oklahoma City in Oklahoma County, Oklahoma. It previously served as a courthouse of the United States District Court for the Western District of Oklahoma, and of the United States Court of Appeals, briefly housing the Eighth Circuit and, then the Tenth Circuit for several decades. It was listed on the National Register of Historic Places in 1974. It continues to house the Bankruptcy court for the Western District of Oklahoma. The building includes Moderne and Beaux Arts.

== Building history ==
The United States Post Office and Courthouse was the first monumental structure in Oklahoma City and served as an anchor for future federal development. Plans for the construction of the building began in 1903 when Congress appropriated funds for a downtown facility. Due to the region's rapid growth, original funding was insufficient and additional money was allotted in 1906, 1908, and 1910. It was the first federal building constructed in Oklahoma, which became a state only five years prior to the building's 1912 completion.

As a courthouse, the building housed the United States District Court for the Western District of Oklahoma. In 1926, the United States Court of Appeals for the Eighth Circuit began using the building, until the Courts of Appeals were reorganized in 1929, and Oklahoma was placed in the Tenth Circuit. The Court of Appeals for the Tenth Circuit met here from 1929 until 1962.

Two important cases were decided in this building. George "Machine Gun" Kelly, a notorious outlaw of the Prohibition era, was found guilty of kidnapping Oklahoma City oilman and millionaire Charles F. Urschel. Kelly was sentenced in 1933 to life in prison and sent to Alcatraz Island in San Francisco Bay. Kelly's trial was the first in the nation to allow sound and picture equipment in a federal courtroom. In 1949, the case of McLaurin v. Oklahoma State Regents was heard. The court's decision desegregated graduate schools in Oklahoma.

The building is part of a Federal complex that included a separate courthouse constructed in 1959 and the Alfred P. Murrah Federal Building. In April 1995, a terrorist bomb destroyed the Murrah building causing tragic injuries and fatalities. Portions of the U.S. Post Office and Courthouse, most notably the tower, were damaged by concussions from the blast. Repairs were made to windows, ceiling tiles, and lights. Today, the site of the bombing is the Oklahoma City National Memorial. A new federal building is located several blocks north of the U.S. Post Office and Courthouse.

The building was listed in the National Register of Historic Places in 1974. In 1992, the U.S. General Services Administration completed a restoration of significant interior spaces. The restoration was recognized with awards from the Oklahoma State Historic Preservation Office and the Oklahoma Chapter of the American Institute of Architects. Although the post office relocated in 1966, the building continues to function in its historic capacity as a federal courthouse and office building.

In 2010, the Historical Society of the United States District Court for the Western District of Oklahoma was established by judges, lawyers, court staff, and community leaders within the District. The Historical Society is “dedicated to the recovery, preservation and presentation of the judicial history of the Western District Court.” In 2015, the Historical Society opened the Federal Judicial Learning Center & Museum, which occupies a portion of the restored first-floor lobby.

== Architecture ==
This landmark building was designed by the Office of the Supervising Architect of the U.S. Treasury Department under James Knox Taylor. The building was constructed in 1912 in the Beaux Arts Classicism style. This style of architecture was commonly used for important public buildings from the end of the 19th century until the early years of the 20th century. The building's symmetry, monumental form, balustrade, and pilasters (attached columns) are characteristic of Beaux Arts Classicism. The original portion of the building is three stories tall and faced with limestone. Pediments, arched openings, and shallow balconies are other notable components of the facade. The roof is covered with red tiles.

The original building was enlarged on two separate occasions. In 1919, an addition that doubled the building size was constructed on the west side of the original building. The Office of the Supervising Architect was once again responsible for the design, which was executed in the Beaux Arts Classicism style to blend with the original portion of the building. The facility was enlarged again in 1932 when another addition was completed. Both additions were carried out by the Office of the Supervising Architect under James A. Wetmore. This second addition, located on the western end of the 1919 portion, once again respected the Beaux Arts Classicism of the earlier portions. As part of the 1932 expansion, a centrally placed tower was added over the 1919 addition. The tower features stylized decorative motifs that are characteristic of Art Deco architecture, which emphasizes the verticality of the design and incorporates Classical forms while minimizing ornate elements.

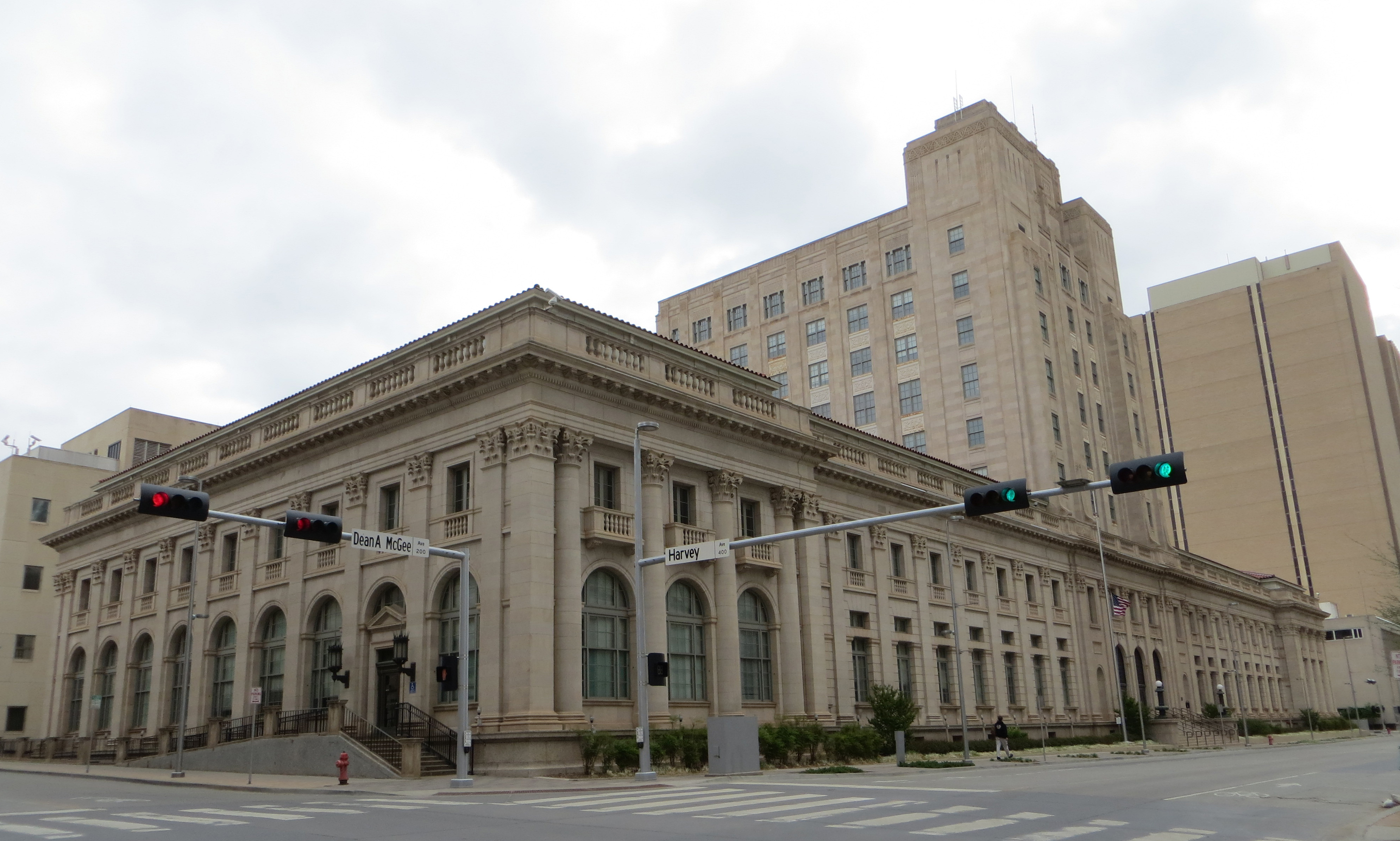
Southwest corner

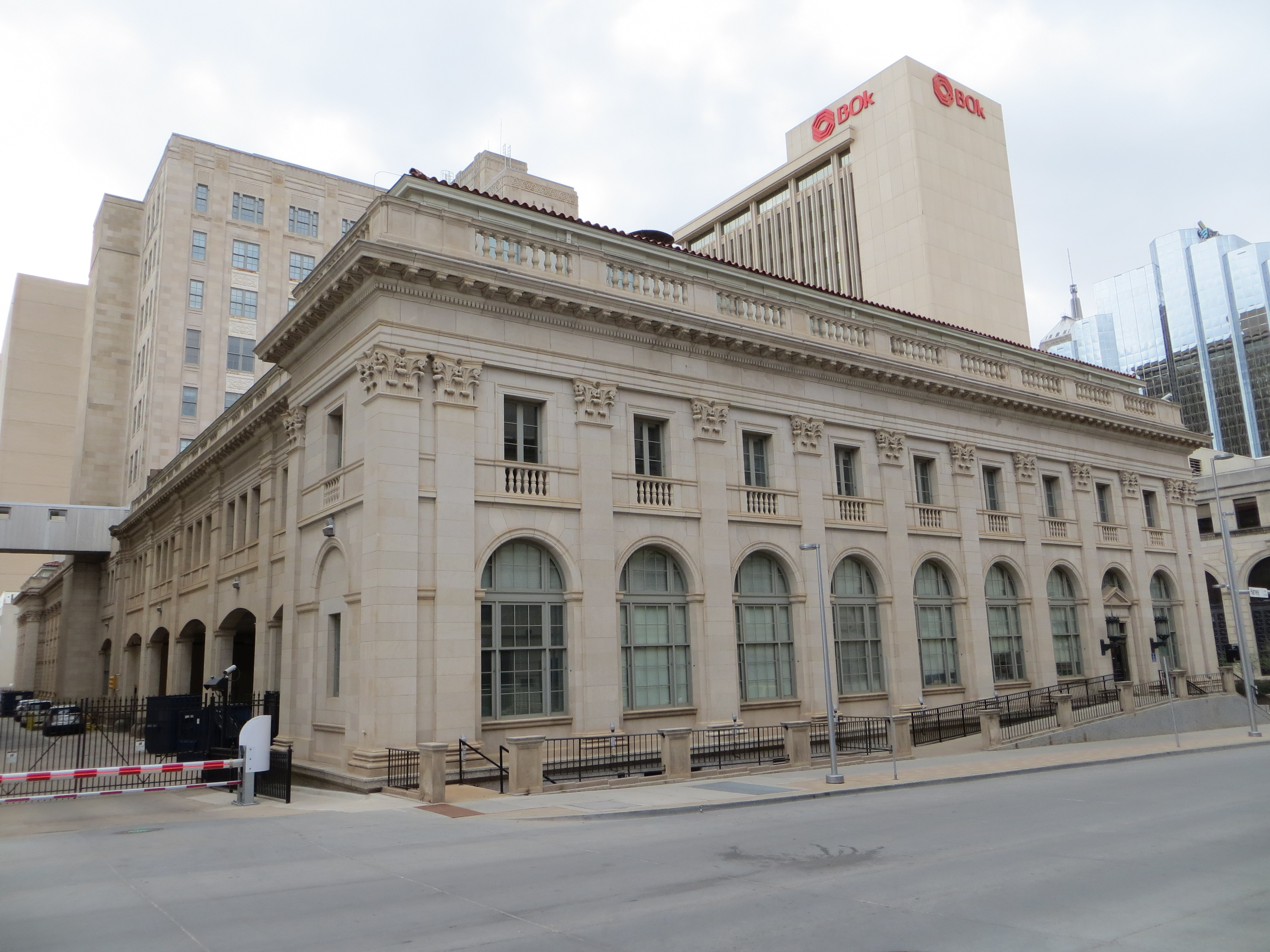
Northwest corner

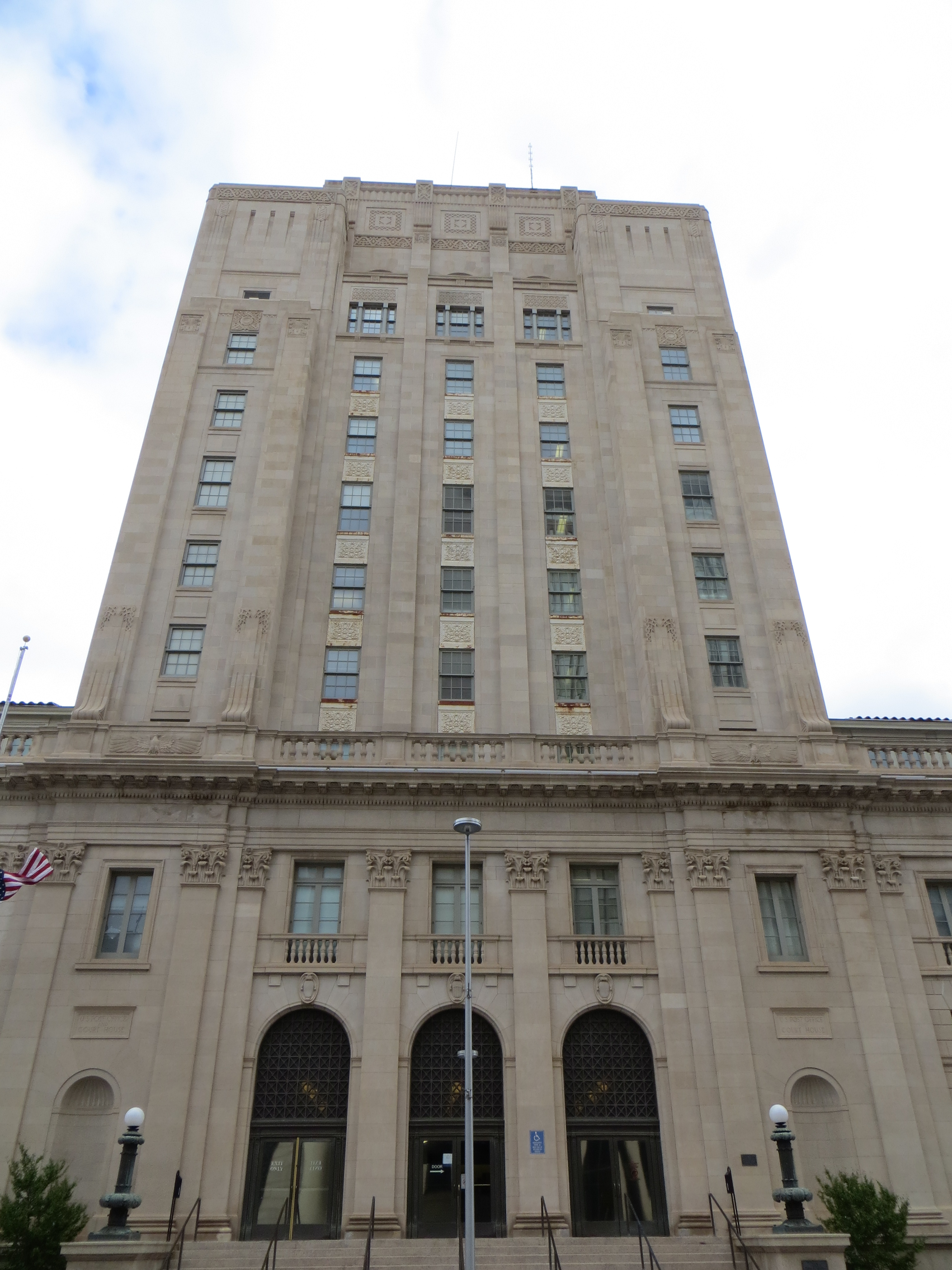
South entrance

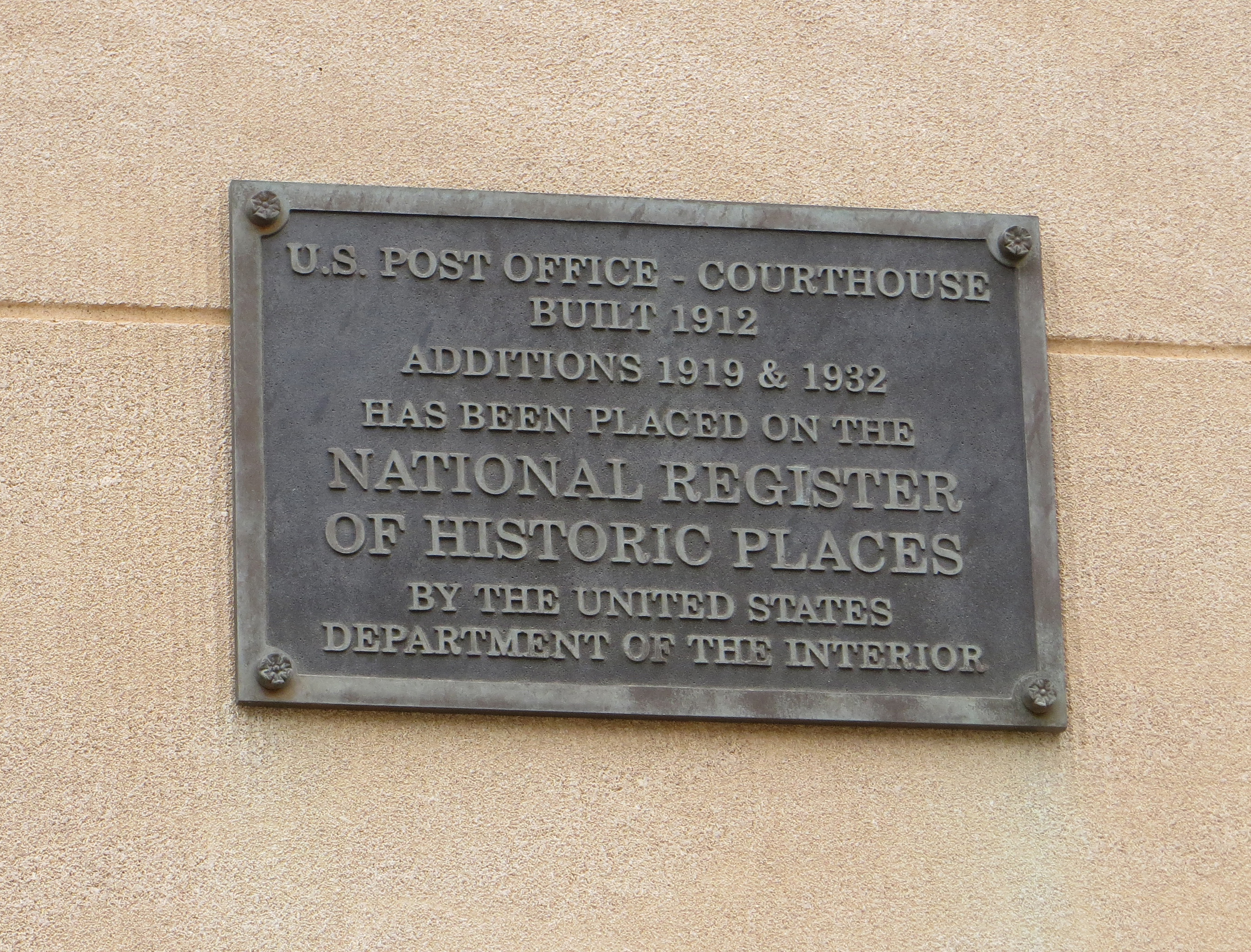
National Register of Historic Places plaque

The interior is as impressive as the exterior. In 1992, the U.S. General Services Administration restored major public spaces to their original splendor. The lobby, which runs the length of the building, contains a barrel-vaulted ceiling with arched openings that contain geometric, metal grilles. Also in the lobby, the patterned tile floor, green-and-gold starburst ceiling stencils, brass chandeliers, and bronze elevator doors were restored. Elaborate ceilings in the courtrooms, some of which contain skylights with grilles, were refurbished. An ornamental painted ceiling was added to the ninth-floor courtroom. Although the ceiling was shown as part of the architect's original design, it was not executed during construction in 1932.

Two murals near the main entrance were painted in 1935 as part of the Works Progress Administration program. Covered up during modernization work, the murals have since been restored. One depicts a Postal Service Pony Express rider seal, and the other is an image of the Great Seal of the United States.

The first floor lobby contains two paintings by James D. Butler that were installed in 1993. "Sunset Near the Chisholm Trail" symbolizes the cowboy heritage and agricultural significance of Oklahoma. "A View Near Tahlequah, Cherokee County" symbolizes the state's Native American legacy and natural beauty.

== Significant events ==
- 1903: Initial plans made for a post office building in the Oklahoma Territory
- 1907: Oklahoma statehood
- 1912: U.S. Post Office and Courthouse completed
- 1919: First Addition to the original building completed
- 1932: Second addition, including the Art Deco tower, completed
- 1933: George "Machine Gun" Kelly trial
- 1949: McLaurin v. Oklahoma State Regents case decided
- 1974: U.S. Post Office and Courthouse listed in the National Register of Historic Places
- 1992: Restoration of the building completed
- 1995: Alfred P. Murrah Federal Building bombed

== Building facts ==
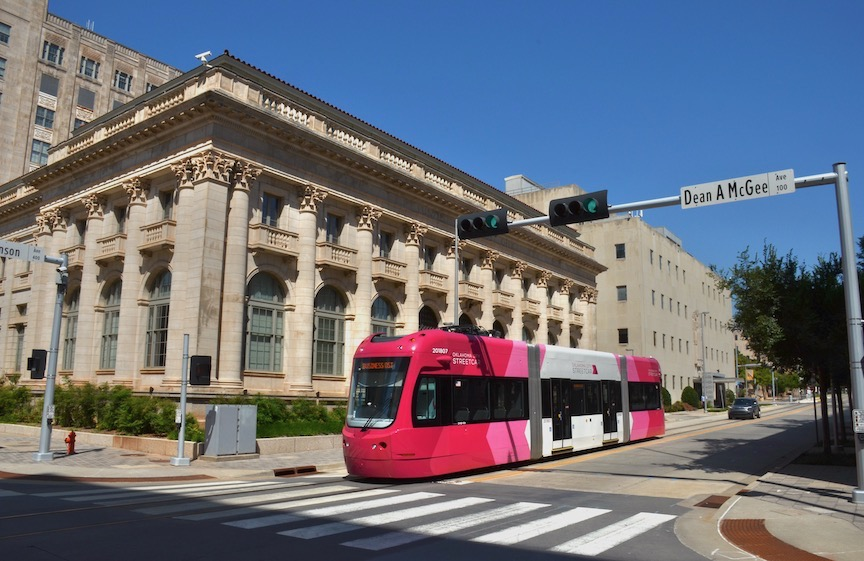
The east end of the building being passed by a streetcar on the OKC Streetcar system

- Location: 215 Dean A. McGee Avenue
- Architects: James Knox Taylor; James A. Wetmore
- Construction dates: 1912; 1919; 1932
- Restoration: 1992
- Landmark Status: Listed in the National Register of Historic Places
- Architectural Style: Beaux Arts Classicism with Art Deco Tower
- Primary Material: Limestone
- Prominent Features: Art Deco Tower; Restored First-Floor Lobby
