= College Kidnappers =

The College Kidnappers was a group of alumni from the University of Illinois who specialized in kidnapping wealthy mobsters for ransom. These mobsters were targets because they were less likely to approach the police and could pay the ransom.

The group was a ten-man, Chicago-based group led by Theodore "Handsome Jack" Klutas.

== Members ==
This mob-affiliated group got their name "College Kidnappers" because their leader Theodore "Handsome Jack" Klutas was an alumnus of the University of Illinois. The regular members of this group included Edward Doll a.k.a. "Eddie LaRue", Russell Hughes, Frank Souder, Gale Swoley, Ernest Rossi, Eddie Wagner, Earl McMahon, Julius "Babe" Jones, and Walter Dietrich.

=== "Handsome Jack" Klutas ===
Theodore Klutas was the son of William and Ida E. Klutas. Handsome Jack was portrayed to be large in stature and very handsome, hence the name "Handsome Jack". Klutas had connections with John Dillinger and with the Chicago crime world. He came from a respectable family who attempted to give him a college education. He attended University of Illinois at Urbana–Champaign in 1923 but did not finish with a degree. He lived a short life, died at the age of 34, and is now buried next to his mother Ida E. Klutas in Whiteside county, Illinois A new case came out questioning if it was at all possible to change one's fingerprints or facial structure to try to trick the arms justice when they went to identify the subject; Handsome Jack was one of the first to try this tactic.

== Kidnappings and ransoms ==
They did some bank jobs, but their main source of income was ransom payments from gamblers, bootleggers, and quite wealthy mobsters. Most of the victims snatched by The College Kidnappers were a part of the Al Capone mob. The College Kidnappers gained over half a million dollars in ransom. The troubles started for this mob group when they all started going off and freelancing. Klutas and Dietrich stole a car in 1930, and after driving for 30 miles they were spotted by police. Upon the mobsters noticing, a gunfight erupted, leaving both officers dead, and the outlaws escaped June 25, 1930. Half a year later, Dietrich joined another gang in order to rob a bank and ended up getting caught and booked to Indiana State Prison. Dietrich escaped three years later along with 10 other inmates with the help of John Dillinger. The College Kidnappers kidnapped a manufacturer but had to later release him because he was proved unable to pay the $50,000 ransom. They realized that their original targets were more dependable as far as coming up with the ransom they demanded. One mobster, James Hackett, was captured twice and the second time he was captured Hackett ended up becoming bankrupt. Hackett's first ransom was paid by his wife for a total of $75,000, and a year later The College Kidnappers demanded a second ransom for double of the first one. After him becoming bankrupt, he was put out of business, which was a big time goal of the Capone syndicates.

In 1933, the Capone gangsters cornered Babe Jones, a member of The College Kidnappers, telling him to pass along the message of a payoff to stop kidnapping other Capone gangsters. Klutas indicated that he liked the deal but later ordered Jones to be killed because he was viewed as a weak individual and could possibly betray Klutas' gang. The two gunmen who were sent to kill Jones were careless. Jones knew the tactics of The College Kidnappers; he saw the two men who were waiting for his arrival, and fled the scene. In order to save his life, he went to the police and told them of several hideouts. The police raided one of those hideouts; they arrested a few but Handsome Jack refused to surrender and was gunned to his death. That was initially the end of The College Kidnappers. The police later captured the rest of these gangsters in February 1934.

== Newspaper articles ==
13 November 1933-Fitchburg Sentinel-Fittsburg Mass.
-"Peoria IL Nov. 13 - Russell Hughes 35, was shot and killed in a barber shop today by police seeking to question him about the operations of "handsome' Jack Klutas half million dollar kidnapping gang. Police said Hughes was an intimate friend of Klutas and other members of a syndicate that is charged with kidnapping a dozen wealthy gamblers of Chicago and other Illinois cities. They indicated he might have been a member of the gang. Two police detectives were wounded in the fight".

13 November 1933-Edwardsville Intelligencer
-"Peoria IL - Nov. 13 Russell Hughes Shot To Death In Peoria. Russell Hughes reputed confederate of Jack Klutas who is one of the midwest's most notorious criminals, was shot and killed today in a gun duel with detectives. Two detectives were wounded. The gun battle occurred shortly before noon when Detective Chief Fred Montgomery and Detective Robert Moran shot it out with Hughes. Physicians said Hughes wounded both officers seriously before he was himself killed. Klutas is reputed leader of a kidnap ring that operated so extensively [in the] midwest that ransoms were estimated at more than one half million dollars. Three alleged members of the gang are under arrest in Chicago but search still is in progess [sic] for Klutas and others."

16 November 1933 – Edwardsville Intelligencer
-"Handsome Jack Klutas branded collegiate leader of the kidnap ring which has extorted nearly $500,000 ransom loot from wealthy midwest gamblers and bootleggers is the target of a search in and near Chicago where he is reported hiding."
21 November 1933-Helena Independent
-"Chicago Nov. 20 - The possibility that scientific enemies of society have, in some cases, succeeded in eliminating finger prints caused speculation today in law enforcement circles. Mal Coghlan, asst. States Atty., said stories had come to him that "Handsome Jack" Klutas, leader of the gang, had had his finger prints changed, and his visage, which is responsible for his nickname, marred to make identification difficult."
24 November 1933-Edwardsville Intelligencer
-"Peoria IL Nov. 24 - John "Handsome Jack" Klutas suspected kidnapper and killer has been named in indictments charging him with counterfeiting, it was learned today. A grand jury indicted Klutas with five other men. It is alleged the suspects manufactured and distributed many thousands of dollars worth of spurious $5 bills. Others charged with counterfeiting in addition to Klutas are Rex Howard, Peoria business man, George Milligan, former State Highway engineer, Peoria and Howard Minnima, alias Robert J. Turner, Frank Lauer and Leo Trant, Chicagoans."
7 January 1934-Helena Independent
-"Chicago Jan 6 - Handsome Jack Klutas leader of a widely sought midwest kidnap band was shot and killed in a police trap today at a surburban apartment where he had been living under the guise of a secret service operative. Five persons were apprehended and taken into headquarters from Bellwood where the trap was laid. Klutas fell in a barrage of police bullets when he attempted to dash for freedom from the apartment which had been under surveillance of states attorney police for ten days. Today police received definite word that Klutas was in the apartment. A squad under Lt. Frank Johnson sent to the house and fast arrested two men who, states attorney Thomas J. Courtney said revealed details of the gang leaders hideout. Other members deployed about the building. Finally Klutas and two others came out. Johnson yelled at him to surrender. In reply, Klutas' pistol barked. Johnsons squad opened fire and Klutas fell with bullets splattered through his body."
