= Albert Bates (criminal) =

American bank robber and partner of Machine Gun Kelly

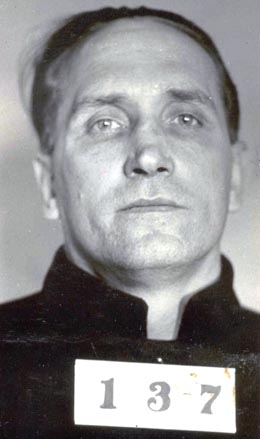
- Mugshot, 1934
- Born: Albert Lawrence Bates; October 16, 1893; Birmingham, Alabama, US
- Died: July 4, 1948 (aged 54); Alcatraz Federal Penitentiary, San Francisco, California, U.S.
- Other names: George Davis, George Harris J.B. King and Magosly
- Occupations: Bank robber and burglar
- Status: Deceased
- Conviction: Kidnapping (1933)
- Penalty: Life imprisonment

Albert Lawrence Bates (October 16, 1893 – July 4, 1948) was an American bank robber and burglar during the 1920s and 1930s. He used a number of different aliases during his criminal career including George Davis, George Harris and J.B. King. He was the longtime partner of George "Machine Gun" Kelly. He also took part in the kidnapping of oil magnate Charles Urschel in July 1933.

== Biography ==
Albert Bates was born on October 16, 1893, to Elizabeth Mary Hughes and Wiley Bates. He enlisted in the U.S. Army in 1911 but was arrested for desertion and sent to the military prison on Alcatraz where he stayed for 15 months. Albert Bates was first arrested in Nevada for burglary on March 28, 1916, and was sentenced to serve 1 to 15 years at the state prison in Carson City. He was paroled on November 13, 1917, and was out for less than half-a-year when he was arrested for burglary in Ogden, Utah, on April 22, 1920. He was convicted on August 3, 1921, and sentenced to five years at the Utah state prison where he remained for five years.

Bates would continuously be in trouble with the law throughout his criminal career, particularly as a young man, and was imprisoned in the Colorado state penitentiary in Cañon City for a third burglary conviction on May 10, 1927.

By the time of his release on July 17, 1930, again being granted parole, Bates had become a hardened criminal. He soon joined up with bank robber "Machine Gun Kelly", who had been released from Leavenworth a month before Bates, and together robbed their first bank in Denton, Texas, with several others on February 6, 1932. Seven months later, he and Kelly teamed with Eddie Bentz to rob a bank on Colfax, Washington, of $77,000 in cash and bonds on September 21. He and Kelly, this time with Eddie Doll, hit another bank in Tupelo, Mississippi, for $38,000 on November 30, 1932. This robbery was one of many wrongly attributed to Pretty Boy Floyd by authorities.

With violent shootouts between outlaws and law enforcement on the rise in 1932 and 1933, Bates and Kelly began considering kidnapping. They may have been encouraged by the successful 1933 kidnapping of brewer William Hamm for $100,000 as they soon began planning the kidnapping of Charles Urschell, a wealthy oil tycoon in Oklahoma City. On July 22, 1933, Bates and Kelly abducted Urschell from his home at gunpoint and drove him to a Texas ranch owned by Kelly's in-laws. They eventually received a $200,000 ransom and Urschell was safely released on July 31.

The ranch was eventually discovered by authorities. Reports vary about detective work by the FBI. Federal agents raided the ranch on August 12 arresting three of Kelly's in-laws and a visiting Harvey Bailey. Bates was arrested the same day in Denver for passing stolen checks. Although Kelly would evade authorities for another month, Bates and the rest involved in the Urschall kidnapping were convicted in federal court on September 30, 1933. All were sentenced to life imprisonment a week later with Bates being sent to Alcatraz where he was later joined by his partner Kelly. Bates died of heart disease on July 4, 1948, and is buried at Holy Cross Cemetery in Colma, California.
