= Mary Belle Harris =

American prison administrator (1874–1957)

Mary Belle Harris

Mary Belle Harris (1874–1957) was an American prison administrator and reformer. She was superintendent of the Federal Industrial Institute for Women in Alderson, West Virginia, from 1927 to 1941. She implemented systems of inmate classification, decentralized housing, and other reforms that were later adopted throughout the Federal Bureau of Prisons. During World War I, she served on the U.S. Department of War's Commission on Training Camp Activities. She was previously superintendent of the State Reformatory for Women in Clinton, New Jersey, and prison superintendent at the Blackwell Island workhouse. She also served on the Pennsylvania Board of Parole.

Harris was the daughter of Bucknell University president John Howard Harris. She earned her Ph.D. from the University of Chicago in Sanskrit and Indo-European comparative philology. Prior to starting her career as a prison superintendent at the age of 40, she taught Latin and studied numismatics.

== Early life, education and teaching ==
Mary Belle Harris was born on August 19, 1874, in Factoryville, Pennsylvania, the eldest of three children. Her father was John Howard Harris, president of Bucknell University and a Baptist minister. Her mother, Mary Elizabeth (née Mace), died when she was five or six years old.

Harris began college in 1890, studying at Keystone Academy and Bucknell University. In 1893 she received a music degree from Bucknell. She was a member of Pi Beta Phi and played tennis and basketball. She earned her A.B. in 1894 and her A.M. in Latin and classics in 1895, also from Bucknell. She started attending the University of Chicago in 1896, earning her Ph.D. in Sanskrit and Indo-European Comparative Philology in 1900. She met Katharine Bement Davis while at the university.

Harris taught Latin in Chicago and at the Bryn Mawr School in Baltimore, Maryland, from 1900 to 1910. She studied numismatics and archeology at Johns Hopkins University. She traveled to Europe in 1912 where she studied Roman currency at Berlin's Kaiser Friedrich Museum and in Rome. She was a teacher and chaperone at Rome's American Classical School. She returned to the United States in 1914.

== Prison administration career ==
=== Blackwell Island workhouse ===
In 1914, Harris was offered a position as a prison superintendent by Katharine Bement Davis, who was then Commissioner of Corrections in New York City. Though she had no previous experience in the field, Harris took the job of superintendent of women and deputy warden at the workhouse on Blackwell Island (now Roosevelt Island). The workhouse was overcrowded, holding around 700 women on average in 150 cells. During her three and a half years at the workhouse, Harris oversaw a series of reforms. She fenced off an area of the prison yard so that the prisoners could exercise outdoors. She also started a library and permitted knitting and card-playing in the cells.

=== State Reformatory for Women and Commission on Training Camp Activities ===
In 1918 Harris was hired as superintendent of the State Reformatory for Women in Clinton, New Jersey. At the reformatory she allowed inmates to share in institutional management responsibilities and a degree of freedom. She continued reforms started by her predecessor, encouraging an inmate-run dairy and a self-governance initiative. Harris took a leave of absence from the reformatory later in the year to assist Martha P. Falconer with the U.S. Department of War's Commission on Training Camp Activities. As the assistant director of the Section on Reformatories and Detention Houses, Harris set up healthcare facilities and detention housing for women arrested in military training camp areas. She then returned to the state reformatory briefly before being hired in 1919 at the notoriously violent State Home for Girls in Trenton. She stayed there until 1924.

=== Federal Industrial Institute for Women ===
Harris traveled to Washington in 1925 with the intention of becoming the International Policewomen's Association's executive secretary. Instead, she accepted an offer from U.S. Assistant Attorney General Mabel Walker Willebrandt to head the first federal women's prison in the United States, the recently authorized Federal Industrial Institute for Women in Alderson, West Virginia. Harris worked with architects in planning the layout of the prison, which opened in 1927. The $2.5 million facility was divided into 14 race-segregated cottages, each with its own kitchen.

As superintendent of the Federal Industrial Institution for Women, Harris promoted vocational training and provided areas for physical activity and farming. She developed a classification system for individual inmates with programming geared towards individuals and a system for inmate self-governance. She insisted on having a staff that was predominately women. Harris believed in indeterminate sentencing, fostering self-respect, and that women usually committed crimes out of an "economic or psychological dependency, especially on men". It was widely publicized as a model federal reformatory for women. Following the formation of the Federal Bureau of Prisons (BOP) in 1930, Harris resisted bureaucratic control, maintaining independence for the institution. She disagreed with BOP Directors Sanford Bates and James V. Bennett on the need for a maximum security prison for women. She used women's networks, the prison's advisory board, and her relationship with Eleanor Roosevelt to protect the character of the institution. She retired from the Federal Industrial Institution for Women in March 1941. Systems and reforms introduced at the women's prison later became standard at the Bureau of Prisons, which has called Harris a "pioneer in unit management, programming, classification, and decentralized housing units".

== Later life and writing ==
Harris served on the Pennsylvania Board of Parole until 1943 and was on the board of trustees for Bucknell University. She lived in Lewisburg, Pennsylvania, and wrote an autobiography, published in 1936 as I Knew Them in Prison. The book was praised by prison reformers Lewis E. Lawes and Austin MacCormick. She also wrote about the poet Kalidasa.

Harris died of a heart attack on February 22, 1957, in Lewisburg.
