= William J. Holloway Jr. United States Courthouse =

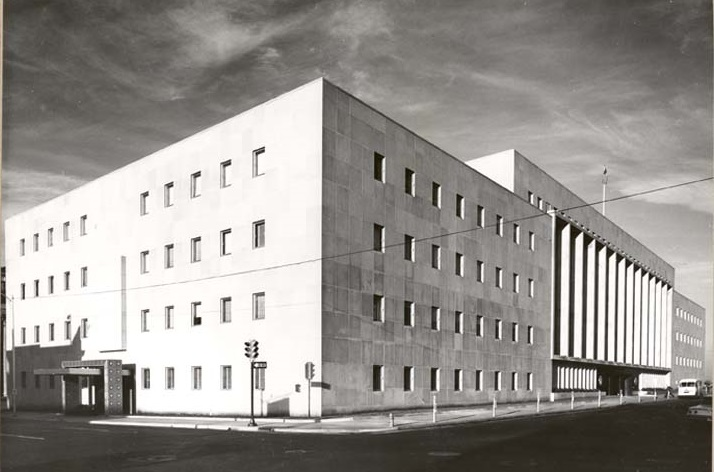
- 1962 photograph of the Federal Building and United States Courthouse, Oklahoma City, Oklahoma.

- Location within Oklahoma Location within the United States

General information
- Type: Courthouse
- Location: 200 Northwest Fourth Street, Oklahoma City, Oklahoma, U.S.
- Coordinates: 35°28′22.4″N 97°31′01″W
- Construction started: 1959
- Completed: 1961

Design and construction
- Developer: Dow Gumerson

The William J. Holloway Jr. United States Courthouse (formerly the Federal Building and United States Courthouse) in Oklahoma City, Oklahoma is a courthouse of the United States District Court for the Western District of Oklahoma and the United States Court of Appeals for the Tenth Circuit.

== Building history ==
By the mid-1950s, the federal government had outgrown its courtroom and office space in Oklahoma City in the 1912 U.S. Post Office and Courthouse. Judge Alfred P. Murrah spearheaded the effort to secure funding for a new federal building and courthouse to be constructed directly north of the existing building. The government selected Oklahoma architect Dow Gumerson to design the new building. At that time, architects were designing federal buildings in Modern styles using innovative forms and materials. Following these trends while also retaining some traditions such as the use of high-quality materials and minimal Classical detailing, Gumerson eschewed the ornate architecture of the past and designed an unadorned yet dignified building.

Gumerson's plans for the new five-story building were approved in 1959. Gumerson incorporated several innovative ideas for the interior spaces, which he designed for flexibility and function. When the federal judges indicated that they were resolving many cases through efficient pretrial conferences rather than long trials, Gumerson included special rooms resembling libraries that were less intimidating than courtrooms for informal meetings. These spaces remain in place, although some now serve additional functions such as law libraries for the judges. Construction was completed in 1961 at a cost of $7 million. Early occupants of the building included the United States District Court for the Western District of Oklahoma, United States Court of Appeals for the Tenth Circuit, United States Department of the Treasury, United States Department of Health, Education, and Welfare, and Federal Bureau of Investigation.

The Federal Building and U.S. Courthouse is located within a federal complex that includes the U.S. Post Office and Courthouse and the Murrah Parking Garage and Plaza. The Alfred P. Murrah Federal Building was also part of this complex until the April 1995 truck bomb explosion that killed 168 people. Today, the Oklahoma City National Memorial and Museum occupies the site. The Federal Building and U.S. Courthouse withstood the blast, although some windows and lights shattered.

In 2016, the building was renamed in honor of William Judson Holloway Jr. (1923–2014), a former chief judge of the Tenth Circuit.

== Architecture ==
"Unity", one of two sculptures on the facade of the courthouse.

The Federal Building and U.S. Courthouse is a Modern building with a box-like form and minimal adornment. Architect Dow Gumerson paid special attention to the scale and details of the nearby 1912 U.S. Post Office and Courthouse, sensitively designing a building that does not overshadow neighboring architecture. The building is an example of Formalism, a style of Modern architecture that emphasizes high-quality materials, smooth wall surfaces, and columnar supports. It also retains characteristics of the earlier distinguished Stripped Classical style that architects used for federal buildings during the Great Depression era. Gumerson avoided many of the typical, mundane federal designs of the 1960s, making the building unusual among government facilities of its time. Gumerson's design is also notable for its use of fine materials on both the interior and exterior.

Clad in Indiana limestone and granite, the building is composed of a central block that rises slightly above flanking wings. The facade is dominated by a colonnade, a design feature Gumerson borrowed from the earlier U.S. Post Office and Courthouse to unify the collection of buildings within Oklahoma City's federal complex. The colonnade rises from the second story, above the street-level entrance, and has thin rectangular engaged columns with a recessed wall behind it. Windows throughout the building, including those on the recessed wall, are evenly spaced and small in scale.

The exterior is largely devoid of architectural ornamentation. However, Gumerson allowed for a few decorative elements to articulate the entrances. The main entrance is recessed and flanked by diagonally positioned limestone panels that form a sawtooth, accordion-like pattern, creating texture and the illusion of movement. Entrances on the east and west elevations are framed with geometric patterns executed in aluminum. Two bas-relief sculptures of stylized grouped figures adorn the limestone walls above the side entrances. Noted sculptor Bernard Emerson Frazier, a former director of the Philbrook Art Center in Tulsa who studied American aboriginal art, created the figures. Although Frazier initially designed nudes, he ultimately executed clothed figures after a local protest. Unity, completed in 1966, is located on the east elevation and portrays a Native American man and woman with two European settlers drawn together by an allegorical depiction of unity. Destiny, completed the following year, is located on the west elevation and depicts a male and a female, with the woman's outstretched hand extending through a flame. An eagle is at their backs.

The interior contains thirteen courtrooms and one hearing room. The district courtrooms and a ceremonial courtroom occupy the third floor and extend two stories. Designed for the U.S. Court of Appeals for the Tenth Circuit, the original fifth-floor courtroom contains a unique circular lightwell, which is located directly over the judge's bench and surrounded by linear source lights. The courtrooms are paneled in walnut veneer that was hand-picked by Gumerson during a trip to a lumber mill in Savannah. The veneer is book matched, a process that requires cutting each panel to create mirror-images of the wood grain. These panels were installed to create symmetrical designs throughout the courtrooms. A similar process was used for the marble surfaces in the building. Black and white marble panels, which have a faint greenish cast, clad the walls of the elevator lobbies and public corridors on each floor. Polished terrazzo floors unify the interior spaces throughout the building.

In the 2000s, the building has undergone several restoration projects. The exterior walls were cleaned, restoring the original warm shades of the granite and limestone. The walnut paneling in the courtrooms has been refinished to its original tone, correcting yellowing of the varnish that occurred since its installation. In the ceremonial courtroom, four of five original skylights have been uncovered to admit natural light as initially intended.

The building was listed on the National Register of Historic Places in 2021.

== Attribution ==
- Material on this page was initially produced by the U.S. General Services Administration, an agency of the United States government, and is reproduced with the express permission of that agency. All works derived from this material must credit the U.S. General Services Administration. The original text produced by the General Services Administration is available here.
