= Destiny (Frazier) =

Sculpture in Oklahoma City, Oklahoma, U.S.

- Artist: Bernard Frazier
- Year: 1966
- Location: Oklahoma City, Oklahoma, United States
- 35°28′18″N 97°31′3.9″W

Destiny is a 1966 bas-relief by Bernard Frazier on the facade of the William J. Holloway Jr. United States Courthouse (200 Northwest 4th Street) in Oklahoma City, in the U.S. state of Oklahoma.

== Description and history ==
The concrete or stone sculpture measures approximately 22 ft. 6 in. x 13 ft. x 16 in., and depicts a woman in the foreground with her arm around an eagle, and a man behind her.

The sculpture was commissioned by the General Services Administration's Art-in-Architecture Program in 1960 for $6,800, and installed in 1967. It was surveyed by the Smithsonian Institution's "Save Outdoor Sculpture!" program in 1994.
