= Edward Doll =

American gangster (1902–1967)

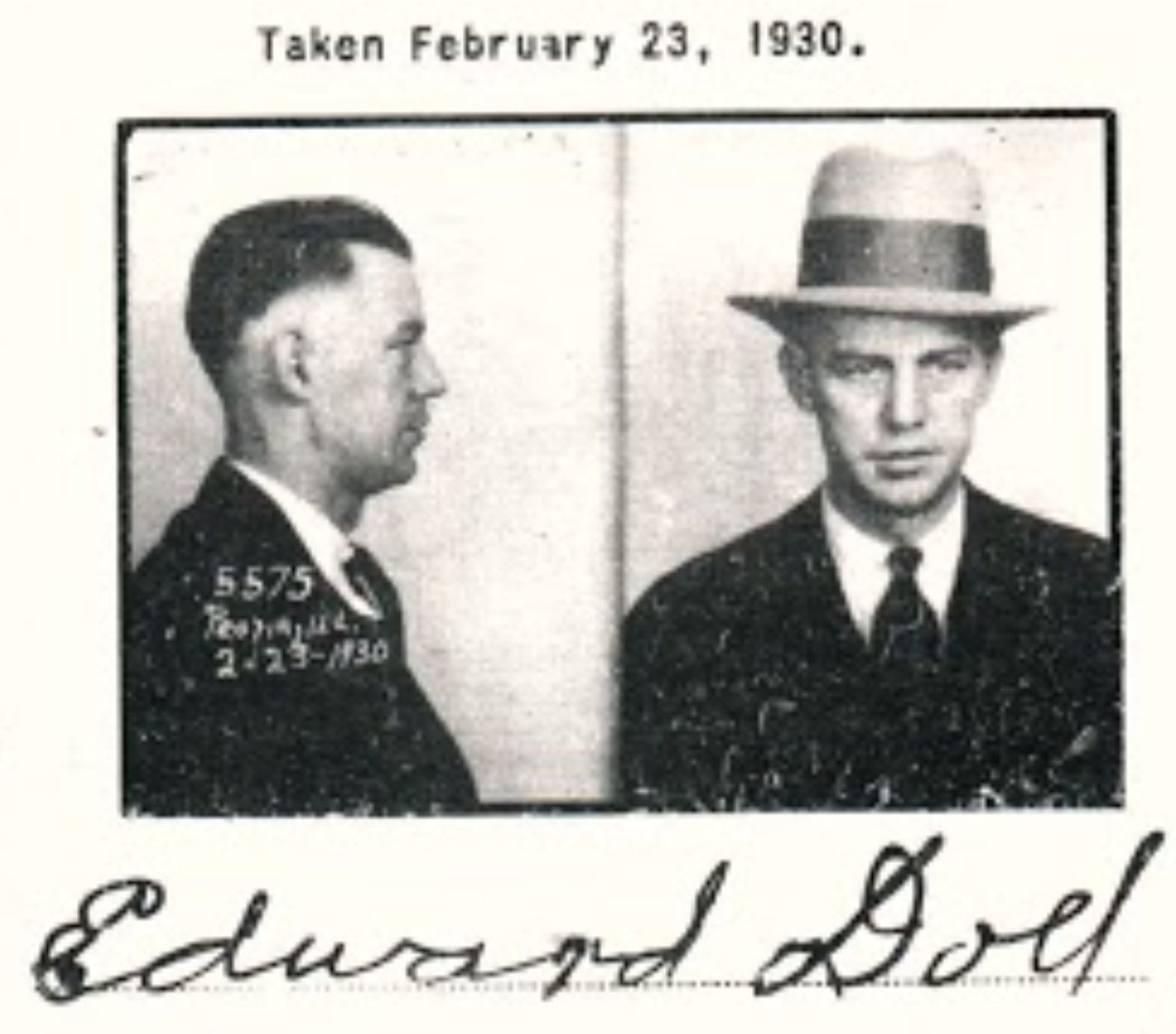
- Mugshot
- Born: January 20, 1902; Chicago, Illinois, U.S.
- Died: February 28, 1967 (aged 65); Las Vegas, Nevada, U.S.
- Other names: Eddie LaRue, Edward LaRue (or sometimes La Rue), Burlington Kid, Leonard E. Foley, Edward Leroux, Frank Lewis, J. E. Jackson
- Occupations: Gangster, kidnapper, bank robber, farmer
- Spouses: (list may not be complete & some marriage starts/ends unknown); Naomi Doll (originally Naomi Whitten; marriage noted in 1923 and ended with her death in 1926); Elizabeth Doll (marriage noted in 1930); Doris Crane (m. 1932; div. 1943): Myrtle Doll (marriage date unknown)
- Parent(s): Edward H. and Emma S. Doll
- Criminal charges: auto theft, bank robbery

Edward Doll (January 20, 1902 – February 28, 1967) was an American gangster from Chicago, Illinois, active during the Prohibition era. Although he is remembered as a lesser figure in Prohibition crime, Doll was featured by name in two 1930s radio dramatizations, was mentioned in books and articles by FBI Director J. Edgar Hoover, and played a leading role in several historic crimes, including the kidnapping of Howard Woolverton and the Lincoln National Bank robbery.

== Early criminal history ==
Doll enlisted in the US Marine Corps in February 1920, but by June of that year had been convicted of an unspecified crime. However, he escaped while en route from Parris Island to the Portsmouth Naval Prison in Kittery, Maine, and by 1922 had changed his name to Edward LaRue and was running a downtown lunch counter in Burlington, Iowa. He was married to the former Naomi Whitten and had a son, Robert. Naomi died on October 11, 1924, and two days after her death, on October 13, 1924, a local paper noted that Edward LaRue and Ben Barber were arrested in Jackson, Nebraska after they were found with a "50-gallon still, another large dismantled still, two barrels of mash and a quantity of the finished product." A jury acquitted both men the following February on charges of illegal possession of a still and equipment.

== Major crimes ==
In February 1930, Doll, still using the alias Eddie LaRue, was arrested in Galesburg, Iowa, and taken to Peoria, Illinois, where he was charged with stealing and transporting an automobile across state lines, a violation of the federal law popularly known as the Dyer Act. An article about the arrest published in The Hawk Eye said the cars, two Packards, had been stolen from a garage in Burlington and driven to Illinois (specifically, Bushnell, Illinois, per subsequent federal records). According to the article, authorities also suspected LaRue (officials claimed that "Doll" was the alias) of leading a gang that had stolen from several area post offices. The article included an interview with a Burlington resident named Elizabeth Doll, who claimed to be married to LaRue and said she was raising a son with him, named Robert. Doll skipped bail and never showed up for trial.

Other criminal activities Doll confessed to in a week-long, 1934 interview with FBI officials included dealings with Chicago crime boss Al Capone, membership in the College Kidnappers gang, the 1930 Lincoln National Bank robbery, other bank robberies in Texas, Mississippi and Washington State, and the January 1932 kidnapping of Howard Woolverton.

== Federal arrest ==
Doll, using the alias Edward Foley, married Doris Barton (originally Doris Crane) on July 27, 1932, and the two moved to a chicken farm near St. Petersburg, Florida in January 1934. On February 14, 1934, Doll and his wife were arrested at their farm by federal agents. While Doll was still a fugitive in the 1929 car theft, and news reports at the time suggested that might be the reason for the arrest, the FBI's extensive file on the kidnapping of Edward Bremer indicates that they apprehended Doll chiefly to obtain information about the Bremer case. Doll had no knowledge of the kidnapping, but confessed to many other crimes during interviews with the FBI over the next week, including the 1929 theft of the car in Burlington. Doris, meanwhile, threatened with a charge of harboring a fugitive, convinced the FBI she had no knowledge of her husband's crimes and was released after a few days in custody.

== Convictions and sentencing ==
In March 1934, Doll was transported to Springfield, Illinois, where he was sentenced to 10 years in federal prison for the 1929 car theft. According to contemporary newspaper reports, federal officials described him at the time as "one of the nation's most notorious criminals."

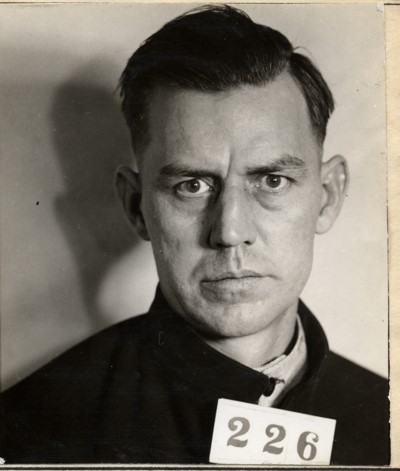
Mugshot of Doll at Alcatraz, circa 1940

Doll began his sentence at the Leavenworth Penitentiary in Kansas, was moved to the Alcatraz Federal Penitentiary a few years later, and moved back to Leavenworth in 1940.

Immediately upon completing his term for car theft in 1940, Doll was transported to Massachusetts to stand trial for the 1933 robbery of the Crocker National Bank in Turners Falls. Doll received a sentence of 20 to 25 years for that crime. While he waited for the jury to decide his fate, Doll met with Doris, to whom he was still married. Doris divorced Edward in 1943 and restored her maiden name, Doris Crane.

== In popular culture ==
Public mentions of Doll included a story of his 1934 arrest in St. Petersburg that aired on NBC radio October 12, 1935. In January 1939, the Gang Busters radio program also featured an account of his crimes and arrest. J. Edgar Hoover mentioned him in several 1937 American Magazine articles and Persons in Hiding, a 1938 book.

== Death ==
Doll died in Las Vegas, Nevada on February 28, 1967, and was laid to rest at Woodlawn Cemetery in that city. Myrtle Doll, his last wife, was buried beside him when she died in 1976.
