= George Weyerhaeuser kidnapping =

1935 kidnapping in the United States

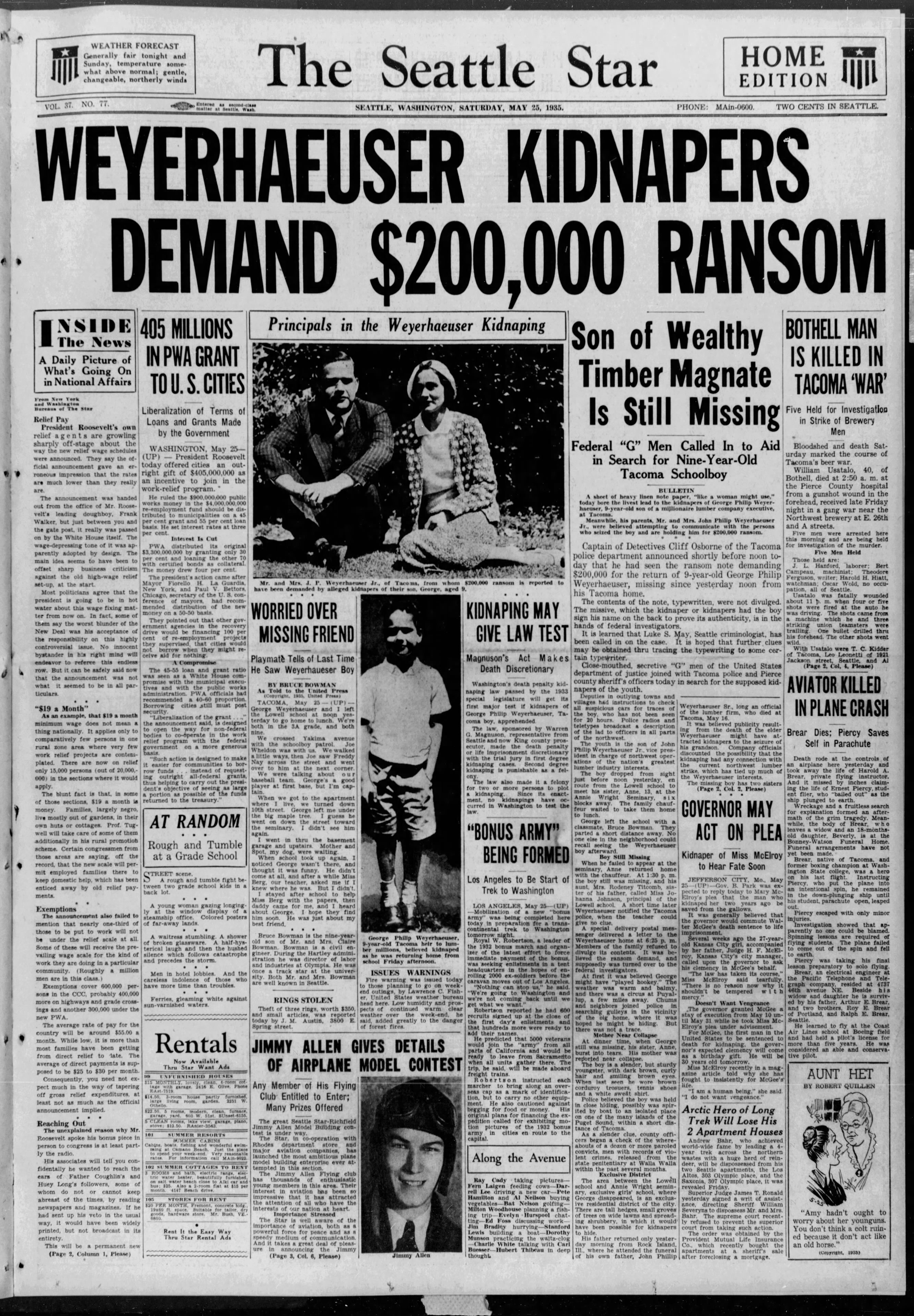
May 25, 1935 front page of The Seattle Star, reporting the kidnapping

The kidnapping of nine-year-old George Weyerhaeuser (Note: George Hunt Walker Weyerhaeuser was born in Seattle on July 8, 1926; he died on June 11, 2022.) occurred in 1935 in Tacoma, Washington, United States. The son of prominent lumberman J. P. Weyerhaeuser, George was successfully released for ransom and eventually succeeded his father as the chairman of the Weyerhaeuser company. The four participants in the kidnapping were apprehended and sentenced to prison terms totaling 135 years. (Note: 45 years for Waley, 20 for his wife, 60 for Dainard, and 10 for Fliss.)

== Kidnapping and ransom ==
On May 24, 1935, George Weyerhaeuser, then nine years old, was released from school for lunch earlier than usual. He walked to the nearby Annie Wright Seminary to meet his sister Ann, where the family's chauffeur generally met the children to drive them home for lunch. Arriving at the Seminary 10 or 15 minutes early, Weyerhaeuser apparently decided to walk home rather than wait. He was kidnapped somewhere en route.

On realizing Weyerhaeuser was missing, the family notified police. That evening, a special delivery letter arrived at the Weyerhaeuser home, demanding $200,000 ($4,856,000 equivalent 2026) in unmarked twenty, ten, and five-dollar bills in exchange for George, whose signature was on the back of the envelope. The Federal Bureau of Investigation (FBI) was soon notified. Adhering to the kidnappers' instructions, a personal advertisement signed "Percy Minnie" was placed in the Seattle Post-Intelligencer on May 25 to indicate that the Weyerhaeusers would comply with the kidnappers' demands. Similar advertisements were placed on May 27 and 29.

A letter received May 29 instructed Weyerhaeuser's father to register at the Ambassador Hotel in Seattle, Washington, and await further contact. Also enclosed was a note from George stating that he was safe. At ten o'clock that night a taxicab driver delivered another letter to the elder Weyerhaeuser at the hotel. This letter directed Weyerhaeuser to drive to a designated point, where he found sticks driven into the ground with a white cloth attached, and a message directing him to another signal cloth farther down the road. However, on reaching this second location he found no message. After waiting two hours, he returned to the hotel. On the morning of May 30, an anonymous caller remonstrated Weyerhaeuser for not following instructions; Weyerhaeuser insisted that he had wanted to cooperate but that he could not find the last note.

At 9:45 that night, a man with a European accent telephoned, instructing Weyerhaeuser to go to an address where he would find a note in a tin can. Thereafter, he proceeded from one point to another, following directions he found at each place. On a dirt road off a highway he found a note telling him to wait five minutes with the dome light of his car lit, then to go to another white sign on the same road. There he found a note telling him to leave his car and walk back toward Seattle; if the money was in order, George would be released within 30 hours. Weyerhaeuser had walked about 100 yards (91 m) when he heard a noise from the bushes. A man ran out, got in the car and drove away with the ransom money.

== Victim's account ==
Young George Weyerhaeuser was released at a shack near Issaquah, Washington, on the morning of June 1, 1935.

Weyerhaeuser revealed that, when he left Annie Wright Seminary on May 24, he took a shortcut through some tennis courts. As he left the tennis courts, he met a man of about 40 with brown hair and a mustache who asked for directions. When George responded, the man picked him up and carried him to a sedan that was parked across the street. The child noticed that a second man was sitting in the front seat of the car. George was put in the back seat and a blanket was thrown over him. He was driven around for over an hour, during which time he heard the men conversing in whispers.

The men stopped the car by the side of a road and removed the blanket covering George. He was given an envelope and told to write his name in pencil on the back of it. He was then blindfolded and carried ten or twelve steps, where he said the man must have waded across a stream because he heard rushing water. On the other side of the stream, he was placed on the ground and led by the hand over the countryside for about one-half or three-quarters of a mile (0.80 or 1.21 km). The boy noticed that the area was covered with bushes or trees, which he frequently brushed against, and that the ground was very uneven. They arrived at a point by a large log, and the man who was leading Weyerhaeuser put him into a hole which had been dug in the ground. Weyerhaeuser, whose blindfold had been removed, estimated the hole to be about four square feet (0.37 m^{2}). After chaining the boy's right wrist and leg, his two captors placed a board over the hole, completely covering it. The men took turns guarding him until about ten o'clock that night, when one of them said that the police might find the hole.

The boy was carried back to the car and placed in the trunk, where he rode for about an hour. He was taken from the car and led through the woods again. Reaching their destination, his kidnappers dug another hole while Weyerhaeuser waited by a tree. The child was placed into this hole, along with a seat from the car and two blankets, and the hole was covered with tar paper.

Investigators later determined that next, on May 26, the two men, accompanied by a woman, put Weyerhaeuser in the trunk of a Ford automobile and drove through Washington into Idaho. Having passed through Blanchard, Idaho, they followed the highway until they turned at a point on the mountain. During the early morning, the boy was taken from the car and handcuffed to a tree, where he was guarded until nightfall. His abductors then took him to a house and put him in a large closet with a mattress, two chairs and a small white table. On the evening of Friday, May 31, Weyerhaeuser was told that they were leaving this house. He noticed a watch on the table indicating it was 5:55. The two men, who addressed each other as "Bill" and "Harry", went upstairs. Weyerhaeuser did not try to run away because the men had told him that he would be going home soon.

Again, Weyerhaeuser was placed in the car's trunk and taken to a little shack near Issaquah, Washington. At about 3:30 the following morning, his captors left, telling him that his father would come to take him home. Weyerhaeuser wandered into a farmhouse and announced his identity. The family took him in, washed him, gave him clean clothes, and drove him to Tacoma, Washington, in their car.

== FBI investigation ==
When the FBI started investigating this case, every precaution was taken to ensure the safe return of the victim. During the period of negotiation, special agents conducted the investigation quietly. Serial numbers of the ransom bills were sent to FBI Headquarters in Washington, D.C., where ransom lists were prepared. Immediately after the kidnappers received the money, these lists were sent to all of the Bureau's field offices for distribution to commercial enterprises, including banks, hotels and railway companies. On June 2, 1935, a $20 ransom bill was tendered in payment of a railway ticket from Huntington, Oregon, to Salt Lake City, Utah. Investigation by FBI agents determined the purchaser to be Harmon Metz Waley.

Shortly thereafter, many ransom bills appeared in discount stores in Salt Lake City. Due to the limited number of special agents available there, police officers were placed in each downtown discount store, and each store was furnished with a copy of the ransom list. As a result, on June 8, a police detective stationed at a Woolworth store was notified by a cashier that a woman had presented one of the ransom bills. The detective took the woman, who proved to be Margaret E. Waley, wife of Harmon Waley, to the FBI's Salt Lake City field office. Upon her arrival at the field office, another ransom bill was discovered in her pocketbook. Although she told a number of conflicting stories, her correct home address was obtained.

=== Arrest of Harmon Metz Waley ===
Later that day, Harmon Metz Waley was arrested at home. After making several false statements, he confessed that he and William Dainard, alias William Mahan, whom he had met in the Idaho State Penitentiary, had kidnapped the boy. He added that his wife had no knowledge of the kidnapping until their arrival in Spokane, Washington. She had been at the hideout house and helped them negotiate the ransom.

Approximately $3,700 of the ransom money was found to have been burned in the Waleys' stove. The ashes were sent to the FBI Laboratory in Washington, D.C., where it was determined that a sufficient number of the bills remained to positively identify them.

Waley claimed that he and Dainard planned to split the money evenly, but that Dainard cheated him out of $5,000. After further questioning at the field office, Waley said that he bought a Ford roadster, which he registered as Herman Von Metz when he arrived in Salt Lake City. Under a clump of trees or bushes, he had buried $90,790, which special agents recovered on June 11.

Learning that Waley arranged to meet Dainard at the home of Margaret Waley's parents, agents proceeded to that house. Her grandfather advised that a man answering Dainard's description had come to the house asking for the Waleys. The grandfather told him that the Waleys had been there earlier to pick up their suitcase but they returned to Salt Lake City and had been arrested. The man exclaimed, "My God, did they get everything they had?" before returning to his car and driving off.

=== Fingerprint examination ===
Physical evidence found in the hideout, the holes and the kidnappers' homes was examined by personnel of the FBI Laboratory. Fingerprint identification positively linked the Waleys and Dainard to the shack where the ransom had been divided. Also, Harmon Waley's fingerprints appeared on the cans in which notes for Mr. Weyerhaeuser were placed, and a fingerprint identified as Margaret Waley's was found at the hideout.

== Indictments and sentencing ==
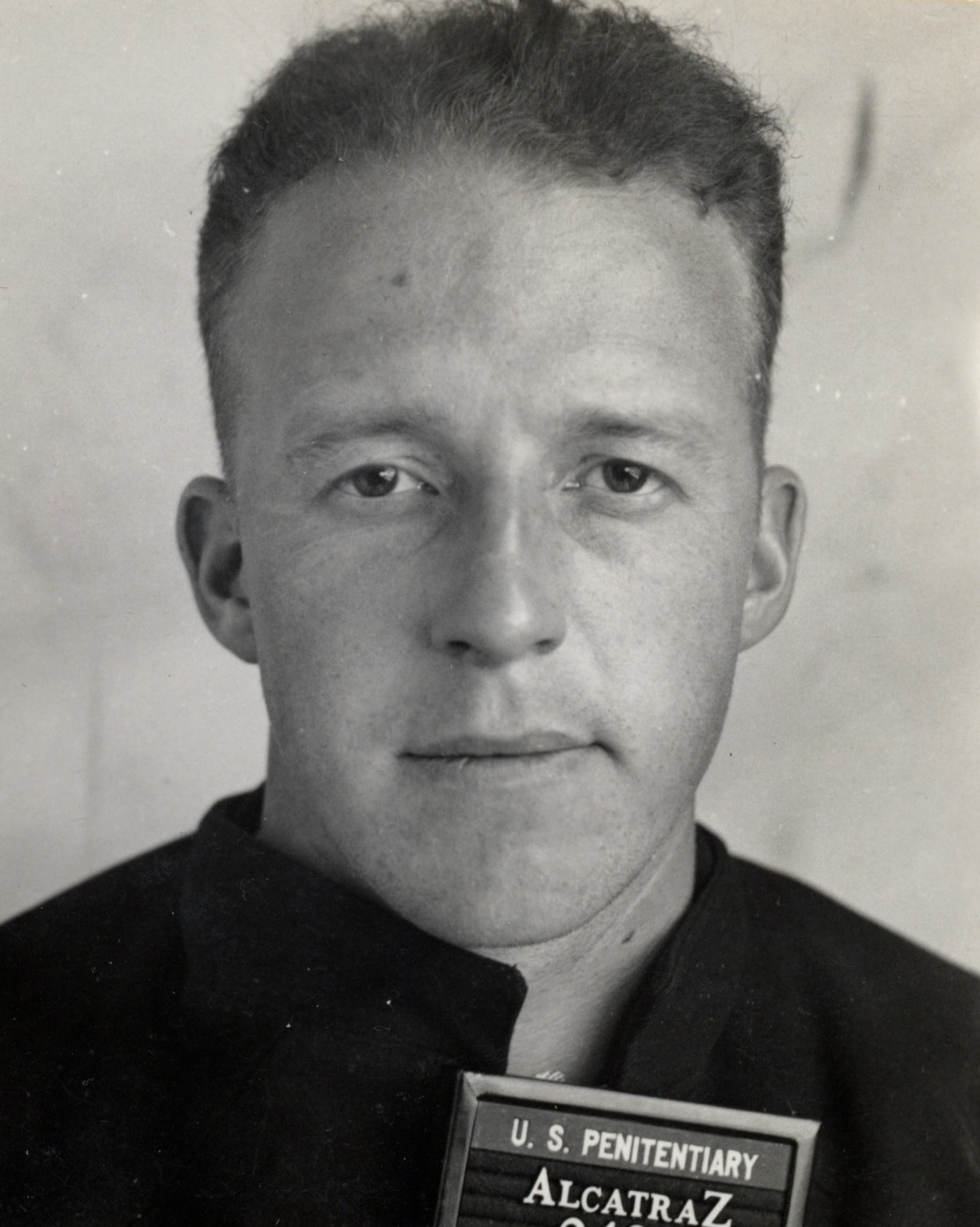
Harmon Waley at Alcatraz Federal Penitentiary

On June 19, a federal grand jury in Tacoma returned an indictment charging William Dainard, Harmon Metz Waley and Margaret E. Waley with kidnapping and conspiracy to kidnap.

=== Waleys sentenced ===
Harmon Waley entered a plea of guilty on June 21, 1935, and was sentenced to serve concurrent prison terms of 45 years on charge of kidnapping and two years on charge of conspiring to kidnap. He was sent to the United States Penitentiary, McNeil Island, Washington, and was later transferred to the United States Penitentiary, Alcatraz Island, California.

On June 22, Margaret Waley pleaded not guilty to both charges. She was brought to trial in United States District Court, Tacoma, on July 5. Four days later, she was sentenced to serve two concurrent 20-year terms in the United States Detention Farm, Milan, Michigan.

=== Dainard located ===
After William Dainard spoke with Mrs. Waley's grandfather, he went to Butte, Montana. On June 9, he was recognized by a police officer who attempted to apprehend him. Dainard eluded the officer, and later his car was found to have been abandoned along with $15,155 in ransom money.

An Identification Order, which included Dainard's photograph, fingerprints, handwriting specimen, and background information, was prepared, and copies were distributed throughout the United States. In response to information received that Dainard may have gone to either Mexico or Australia, copies of the Identification Order also were furnished to police agencies in both countries. In early 1936, bills with altered serial numbers began to surface in the western part of the U.S. The FBI Laboratory's examination of these bills revealed the true serial numbers to be identical with those of ransom bills. Banks were advised to be alert to any person presenting altered currency for exchange.

=== Dainard arrested ===
On May 6, 1936, employees of two different Los Angeles, California, banks reported that a man had exchanged altered bills at each bank. His license number, obtained by personnel of both banks, was issued to a Bert E. Cole. A surveillance was maintained at the address listed for that license number. On the morning of May 7, 1936, special agents assigned to the FBI's San Francisco field office were instructed to search that neighborhood. Two agents found a Ford bearing the reported license number in a parking lot enclosed by a wire fence.

Later, a man entered the car and attempted to start it. When it failed to start, he got out of the car and lifted the hood. Agents approached the man, who was readily identified as being Dainard. He submitted to arrest without resistance, and a .45 caliber Colt pistol was removed from his person.

When questioned, Dainard admitted his participation in the kidnapping. At the time of his arrest, agents recovered $37,374.47 in ransom money and bills that Dainard admitted he had received in exchange for ransom money. Special agents also recovered $14,000 in $100 bills that Dainard had buried in Utah. In addition, various dyes and other paraphernalia used to change serial numbers on paper currency were found in the garage of his Los Angeles home. Dainard was transferred to Tacoma, where he entered a guilty plea in the United States District Court on May 9, 1936. He was sentenced to serve two concurrent 60-year prison terms for kidnapping and conspiring to kidnap. That same day, he was sent to the federal McNeil Island Penitentiary in Washington. Upon his subsequent transfer to the federal Leavenworth Penitentiary in Kansas, prison authorities determined Dainard to be insane and recommended that he be confined to a hospital.

=== Accomplice ===
Further investigation by the FBI revealed that Edward Fliss, (Note: Edward Fliss (no middle name) was born on December 5, 1905, in Stevens Point, Wisconsin.) an associate of Dainard's, had assisted him in exchanging the ransom money. Fliss was located at the Delmar Hotel, San Francisco, where he was arrested by FBI agents. He offered no resistance and admitted to helping Dainard dispose of the ransom money.

Fliss, who also used the alias Frank "Red" Lane, had previously been convicted and served prison time for his role in the 1925 kidnapping of W. B. Kinne, at the time the Lieutenant Governor of Idaho. Fliss was removed to Seattle, where he pleaded guilty to assisting in the disposition of ransom money and was sentenced to 10 years in McNeil Island Federal Penitentiary and fined $5,000.

== Aftermath ==
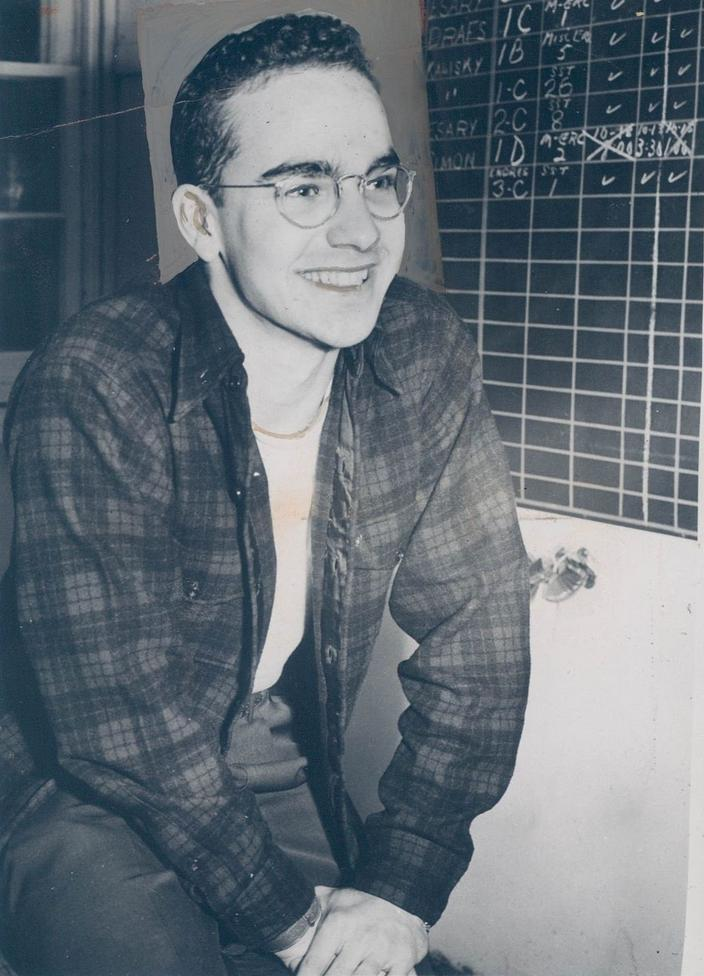
Weyerhaeuser in 1944

During the course of the investigation, special agents of the FBI recovered a total of $157,319.47 in ransom money and cash received in exchange for ransom money.

Waley wrote to George Weyerhaeuser from prison several times, apologizing for his actions. He was released from prison on June 3, 1963, aged 52. George Weyerhaeuser later gave Waley a job, noting in a 1983 interview that Waley had treated him well during the kidnapping. Waley died in February 1984, aged 73.

Dainard, born in 1902 in Cando, North Dakota, died in 1992 in Great Falls, Montana.

The kidnapping was the subject of a 2021 true crime novel by Seattle native Bryan Johnston, titled Deep in the Woods: The 1935 Kidnapping of Nine-Year-Old George Weyerhaeuser, Heir to America's Mightiest Timber Dynasty.

== See also ==
- Federal Kidnapping Act, also known as the Lindbergh Law, enacted in 1932
- List of kidnappings
- List of solved missing person cases (pre-1950)

== Sources ==
- Duncan, Don. Washington: The First Hundred Years — 1889-1989. The Seattle Times Press, 1989.
