= Kathryn Kelly =

American criminal (1904–1985)

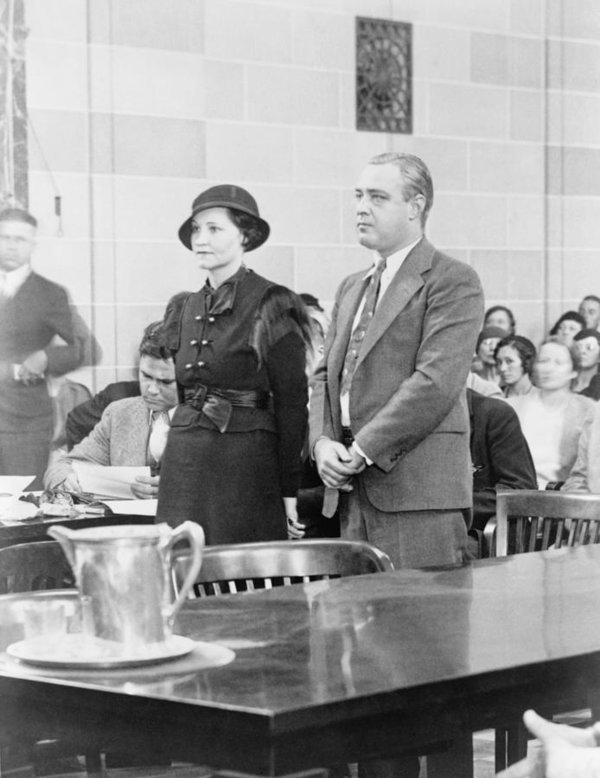
- Kathryn and George Kelly during trial for the kidnapping of Charles F. Urschel, 1933.
- Born: Cleo Lera Mae Brooks; March 18, 1904; Saltillo, Mississippi, U.S.
- Died: May 28, 1985 (aged 81); Oklahoma City, Oklahoma, U.S.
- Resting place: Tecumseh Cemetery, near Oklahoma City
- Occupation: Criminal
- Known for: Bootlegging
- Spouses: Lonnie Clyde Fry; L. G. Brewer; Charlie Thorne; Machine Gun Kelly
- Children: 1
- Parent(s): James Emory Brooks and Ora Coleman
- Conviction: Kidnapping
- Penalty: Life imprisonment

Kathryn Kelly (March 18, 1904 – May 28, 1985) was an American criminal active during the prohibition era. She was involved in bootlegging, assisted her fourth husband, George Kelly Barnes ("Machine Gun Kelly"), in his crimes, and actively encouraged the idea that her husband was a dangerous criminal. Kelly was convicted along with her husband for the kidnapping of oil tycoon and businessman Charles F. Urschel.

== Early life ==
Kathryn was born Cleo Lera Mae Brooks on March 18, 1904, in Saltillo, Mississippi, to James Emory Brooks and Ora (née Coleman). When she was nine years old, her family moved to Coleman, Texas. Her parents divorced and her mother started work as a hotel manager, subsequently marrying rancher and local political figure Robert G. "Boss" Shannon of Paradise, Texas, in 1927.

Cleo changed her name to Kathryn before marrying her first husband, Lonnie Clyde Fry, at the age of 14. She gave birth to her only child, Pauline, in 1919. After two years she separated from her husband. She married again, this time to L. G. Brewer, but they soon separated and she moved to Fort Worth, Texas, with her mother and stepfather.

Her third husband was a bootlegger called Charlie Thorne. After a quarrel, Thorne (who was illiterate) was found dead with a typed suicide note. The judge looked past this and Kathryn was never convicted for the murder.

== Career ==
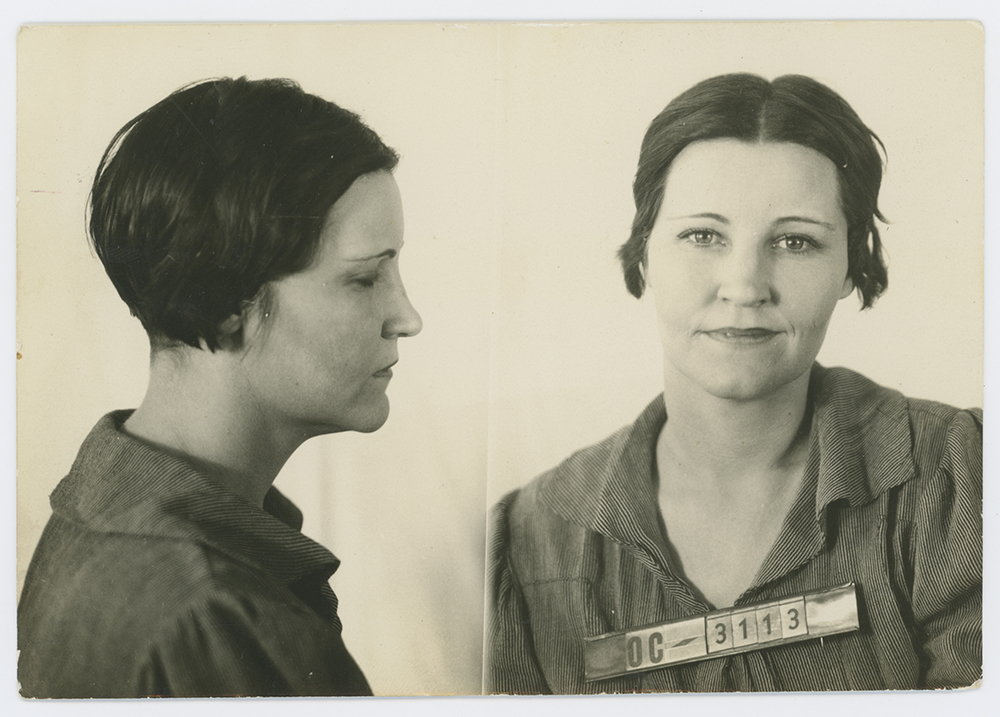
Mug shot of Kathryn Kelly

Kathryn was already an experienced criminal by the time she met George Kelly. Together, they operated as bootleggers in Fort Worth. She bought him a machine gun and gave him the nickname "Machine Gun Kelly". Together they planned their various kidnapping schemes, including their successful July 1933 abduction and ransoming of Charles F. Urschel. They used the farm of Kathryn's mother Ora to hide Urschel. For this kidnapping they collected a ransom of $200,000 ($4.97 million today).

While on the run with her husband, Kelly tried to broker a deal with an Federal Bureau of Investigation (FBI) agent for a lenient sentence for herself and her mother in exchange for turning in George. This deal never went through, as the FBI captured her husband before they finalized it. Kelly, her husband, her mother Ora, and her stepfather, Shannon, were sentenced to prison as a result. Kelly and her mother were sentenced to life; Shannon was sentenced to 25 years, although President Franklin D. Roosevelt pardoned him after 11; and George "Machine Gun" Kelly later died in prison in Leavenworth, Kansas.

Kelly and her mother served 25 years together at a women's correctional establishment in West Virginia before being released. Shannon was released after serving eleven years of his sentence and returned home, where he died twelve years later. Upon the death of "Machine Gun" Kelly, whose family did not claim the body, Shannon arranged for his burial in the Shannon family plot.

== Later life ==
Upon their release, Kelly and her mother Ora lived quietly in Oklahoma City. Kathryn changed her name to Lera Cleo Kelly and worked as a bookkeeper at the Oklahoma County Poor Farm, which was at that time a hospital and nursing home. Ora died in 1980, aged 92, followed by Kelly—aged 81—in 1985. Both women are buried at the Tecumseh Cemetery, near Oklahoma City.
