= Charles F. Urschel =

American oil company executive, kidnap victim

Charles Frederick Urschel (March 7, 1890 – September 26, 1970) was an American oil business tycoon and kidnap victim of George "Machine Gun" Kelly.

Urschel eventually helped solve the crime himself by carefully noting evidence of his whereabouts during his captivity despite being blindfolded, and leaving fingerprints on every surface he could reach. After being released after the ransom was delivered, Urschel was able to supply ample information for the FBI to solve the crime.

== Early years ==
Charles F. Urschel was born in Washington Township, Hancock County, Ohio, in 1890 to Daniel Urschel and Emma (Anna) M. Bangert.

Urschel's first marriage was to Flored Slick, the sister of Thomas Baker Slick Sr., an oil magnate known as "The King of the Wildcatters". Tom Slick died on August 16, 1930, from a fatal stroke following surgery. After Flored's death in 1931, Charles Urschel, Tom Slick's brother-in-law and a trustee to his estate, then married Slick's widow, Berenice. Their combined fortunes made them one of the wealthiest couples in Oklahoma City.

== Kidnapping ==
On July 22, 1933, using his trademark machine gun, George "Machine Gun" Kelly, along with Albert L. Bates, interrupted a bridge game at Urschel's residence in Oklahoma City, abducting Urschel and his guest, fellow oilman Walter R. Jarrett (who would later relocate to Midland, Texas, where he died in 1947 aged 60), at gunpoint while their wives "helplessly watched". This began a startling kidnapping case evoking the new Lindbergh kidnapping laws, led to 21 convictions, coined a new name for Federal Bureau of Investigation agents, G-Men, and culminated in one of the first filmed trials.

The two men were forced into the back seat of Kelly's Chevrolet Sedan and driven to a point 12 miles from the city limits. After ascertaining which of the men was Urschel by checking his wallet, Jarrett was released, and the criminals took Urschel to a farmhouse in Paradise, Texas, where they held him for over a week. The kidnappers released him on July 30 after Ernest Kirkpatrick, then the editor of the Brownwood Bulletin, as well as a representative for the family, paid $200,000 in documented bills (equivalent to $4.52 million in 2022). During his captivity, Urschel, although blindfolded most of the time, memorized many details about his location, including the passing of an airplane overhead at the same times every day. This and other information the FBI had garnered helped locate the hideout.

Because of the media's recent attention to the Lindbergh kidnapping and his agency's floundering reputation, FBI director J. Edgar Hoover took special interest in this case. The Lindbergh Law defined kidnapping as a federal offense punishable by death, and Hoover wanted to impress the public in the first high-profile crime regulated by the new law. Many reported Berenice Urschel talked to the FBI director the night of the abduction. Hoover pulled one of his best agents, Gus Jones, from the Kansas City Massacre investigation and made the Urschel kidnapping an agency priority.

When Gus Jones of the FBI raided the farmhouse in Paradise, he was accompanied by Bill Eads and Charles Urschel himself. There they arrested the owners, Robert and Ora Shannon, and Harvey Bailey, who was using the farm as a safe house after committing a bank robbery in Kingfisher, Oklahoma, with Kelly's machine gun. Bailey also had some of the Urschel money in his possession. Through the continuing investigation seven persons, including Bates, who was arrested in Denver, Colorado, were tried and convicted by a jury in Oklahoma City in September and October 1933. Two of the felons, Edward Berman and Clifford Skelly, received sentences for "money changing" or exchanging the tainted bills for clean, spendable currency. During the trial, the Kellys penned letters threatening Urschel, his family, witnesses, the prosecuting attorney, and the judge. On September 26, 1933, FBI agents captured George and Kathryn Kelly in Memphis, Tennessee. The FBI claimed that Kelly cried, "Don't Shoot, G-men", thus coining the name by which the government agency was known for years afterwards.

The FBI flew the Kellys into Oklahoma City to stand trial days before U.S. judge Edgar S. Vaught sentenced the other defendants. The judge sentenced Bates, Bailey, and Ora and Robert Shannon to life in prison for their roles in the kidnapping. The press believed that George and Kathryn Kelly would plead guilty, but they both entered a not guilty plea. On October 12, 1933, Judge Vaught decreed both George and Kathryn guilty and sentenced them to life in prison.

== Later life and death ==
In 1945, Urschel and his wife relocated to San Antonio, Texas, where he ran the Slick-Urschel Oil Company and was a founding trustee of San Antonio's Southwest Research Institute and the Southwest Foundation for Research and Education, alongside other philanthropic work. Despite his belief that Kathryn Kelly was the mastermind behind the criminal operation (as stated by Kent Frates, Urschel's nephew, in his 2014 book Oklahoma's Most Notorious Cases), Urschel anonymously funded the college education of her daughter Pauline, this only being discovered by author Stanley Hamilton much later, in the course of writing his 2003 book, Machine Gun Kelly's Last Stand (University of Kansas Press).

Urschel died on September 26, 1970, having survived his wife Berenice by four months.

== See also ==
- List of solved missing person cases
