= Machine Gun Kelly (gangster) =

American gangster (1895–1954)

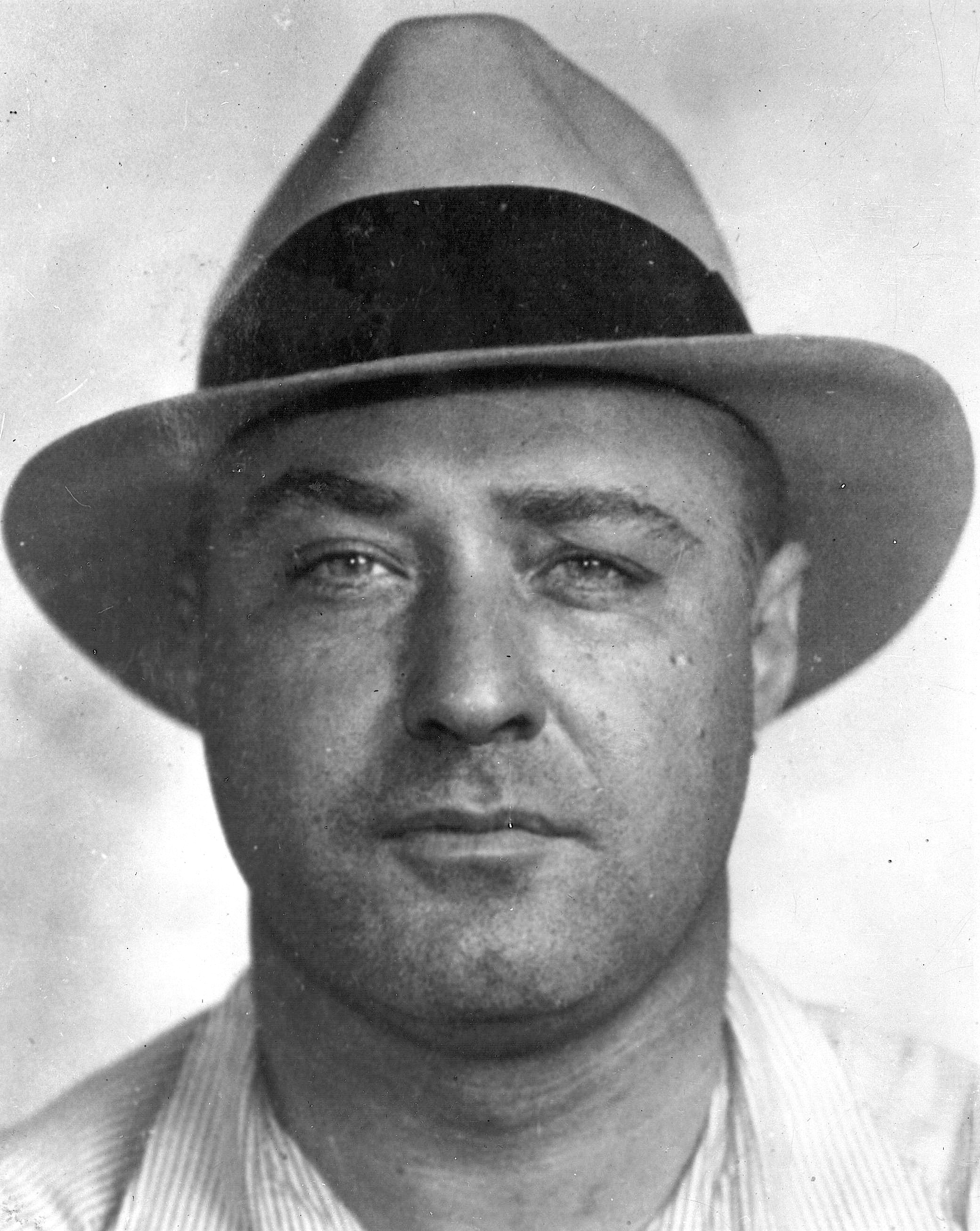
- Mugshot of Kelly
- Born: George Kelly Barnes; July 18, 1895; Memphis, Tennessee, U.S.
- Died: July 18, 1954 (aged 59); USP Leavenworth, Leavenworth, Kansas, U.S.
- Other name: Pop Gun Kelly
- Education: Mississippi A&M (now Mississippi State University)
- Occupations: Gangster, bootlegger, kidnapper, businessman
- Spouses: Geneva Ramsey (m. 1916; div. 1926) Kathryn Kelly (m. 1930)

George Kelly Barnes (July 18, 1895 – July 18, 1954), better known by his nickname Machine Gun Kelly, was an American gangster from Memphis, Tennessee, active during the Prohibition era. His nickname came from his favorite weapon, a Thompson submachine gun. He is best known for the kidnapping of oil tycoon and businessman Charles F. Urschel in July 1933, from which he and his gang collected a $200,000 ransom (equivalent to $5 million in 2026). Urschel had collected and left considerable evidence that assisted the subsequent investigation by the Federal Bureau of Investigation (FBI), which eventually led to Kelly's arrest in Memphis on September 26, 1933. His crimes also included bootlegging and armed robbery.

== Early life ==
Kelly's first sign of trouble came when he enrolled in Mississippi State University to study agriculture in 1917. From the beginning, Kelly was considered a poor student with his highest grade (a C-plus) awarded for good physical hygiene. He was constantly in trouble with the faculty and spent much of his academic career attempting to work off the demerits he had earned. It was during this time that Kelly met a young woman by the name of Geneva Ramsey. Kelly quickly fell in love with Geneva and made an abrupt decision to quit school and marry.

== Career ==
During the Prohibition era of the 1920s and 1930s, Kelly worked as a bootlegger for himself as well as a colleague. After a short time, and several run-ins with the local Memphis police, he decided to leave town and head west with his girlfriend. To protect his family and to escape law enforcement officers, he changed his name to George R. Kelly. He continued to commit smaller crimes and bootlegging. He was arrested in Tulsa, Oklahoma, in 1928, for smuggling liquor onto an Indian reservation, and sentenced to three years at Leavenworth Penitentiary, Kansas, beginning February 11, 1928. He was reportedly a model inmate and was released early. Shortly thereafter, Kelly married Kathryn Thorne, an experienced criminal who purchased Kelly's first machine gun and insisted—despite his lack of interest in weapons—that he perform target practice in the countryside. She also went to great lengths to familiarize his name within underground crime circles.

According to Persons in Hiding, a 1938 book by FBI Director J. Edgar Hoover, Kelly worked with Kathryn and Eddie Doll in the kidnapping of a wealthy manufacturer in South Bend, Indiana, for a $50,000 ransom. Similar claims were made in several 1937 American Magazine articles co-authored by Hoover. While Hoover chose not to name the victim in either his book or magazine articles, local newspaper stories about Hoover's claims assumed that he was referring to the January 26, 1932, abduction of Howard Arthur Woolverton. Woolverton was released unharmed after less than 24 hours in captivity, and the crime was essentially forgotten in the following decades, but his kidnapping was reported widely at the time and proved to be historic, characterized by contemporary reporting as a turning point in America's growing kidnapping scourge. The New York Daily News called his abduction "spectacular", asserted that "for brazen audacity (it) has no parallel", and suggested that such crimes "represent a challenge to organized society". Woolverton's kidnapping revived consideration of the Lindbergh Law in Congress and spawned several nationally distributed newspaper projects that sought to take the full measure of the growing crime wave, and which described kidnapping as a threat to every American. Completion of these projects (including a 16-part series in the Daily News), were ready for publication within days of the March 1, 1932, kidnapping of Charles Lindbergh Jr., meaning that the infant's abduction was presented not as a single crime but as part of a growing national problem.

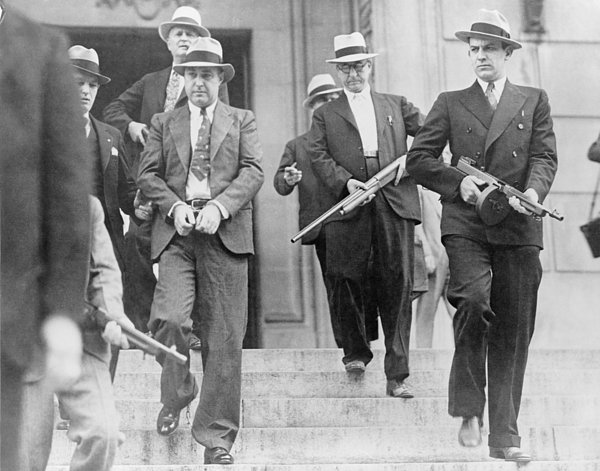
Kelly is led from Shelby County Jail en route to Memphis Airport and Oklahoma City for his trial for the kidnapping of Charles F. Urschel, October 2, 1933

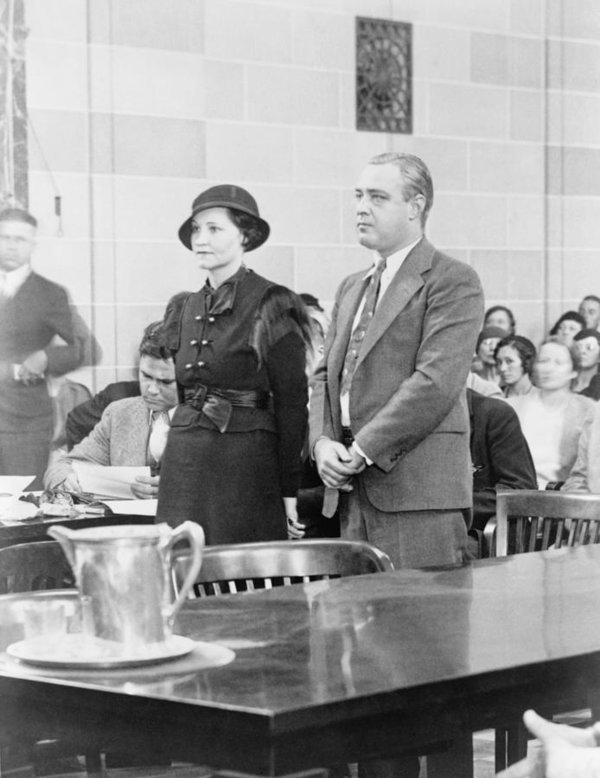
Kathryn and George Kelly receive life sentences for the Urschel kidnapping, October 12, 1933

Kelly's last criminal activity was another history-making abduction, the July 1933 kidnapping of wealthy Oklahoma City resident Charles F. Urschel and his friend Walter R. Jarrett, which would prove to be Kelly's undoing. The Kellys demanded a ransom of $200,000 ($5.0 million today), and held Urschel at the farm of Kathryn's mother and step-father. Urschel, having been blindfolded, made note of evidence of his experience, including remembering background sounds, counting footsteps and leaving fingerprints on surfaces in reach. This proved invaluable for the FBI in its investigation, as agents concluded that Urschel had been held in Paradise, Texas, based on sounds that Urschel remembered hearing while he was being held hostage.

An investigation conducted in Memphis disclosed that the Kellys were living at the residence of J. C. Tichenor. Special agents from Birmingham, Alabama, were immediately dispatched to Memphis, where, in the early morning of September 26, 1933, a raid was conducted. George and Kathryn Kelly were taken into custody by FBI agents and Memphis police officer Thomas Waterson and Sergeant William Raney. It is often reported that Kelly was caught without a weapon and allegedly shouted, "Don't shoot, G-Men! Don't shoot, G-Men!" as he surrendered to FBI agents. This version of events appears to be a media myth created months after the arrest. Another version of the raid alleged Kelly had a pistol in his hand, but with a shotgun aimed at his heart he surrendered, saying, "I've been expecting you." However, the FBI's earliest account of the event was written between three and five days after Kelly's arrest and states: "Agent William Asbury 'Ash' Rorer saw that Kelly ... had proceeded into the front bedroom and was in a corner with his hands raised. He was covered by [Memphis Police] Sergeant William Raney" with Kelly not reported to have spoken at all.

The arrest of the Kellys was overshadowed by the escape of ten inmates, including all of the members of the future Dillinger Gang, from the penitentiary in Michigan City, Indiana, that same night.

The trial was held at the Post Office, Courthouse, and Federal Office Building in Oklahoma City with Judge Edgar S. Vaught presiding. On October 12, 1933, George and Kathryn Kelly were convicted and sentenced to life imprisonment.

An investigation in Coleman, Texas, disclosed that the Kellys had been housed and protected by Cassey Earl Coleman and Will Casey, and that Coleman had assisted George Kelly in storing $73,250 of the Urschel ransom money on his ranch. This money was located by Bureau agents in the early morning of September 27 in a cotton patch on Coleman's ranch. They were both indicted in Dallas, Texas, on October 4, 1933, charged with harboring a fugitive and conspiracy, and on October 17, 1933, Coleman, after entering a plea of guilty, was sentenced to serve one year and one day, and Casey, after trial and conviction, was sentenced to serve two years in the United States Penitentiary at Leavenworth, Kansas.

The kidnapping of Urschel and the two trials that resulted were historic in several ways. They were:

1. the first federal criminal trials in the United States in which film cameras were allowed;
2. the first kidnapping trials after the passage of the Lindbergh Law, which made kidnapping a federal crime;
3. the first major case solved by J. Edgar Hoover's FBI; and
4. the first prosecution in which defendants were transported by airplane.

== Death ==
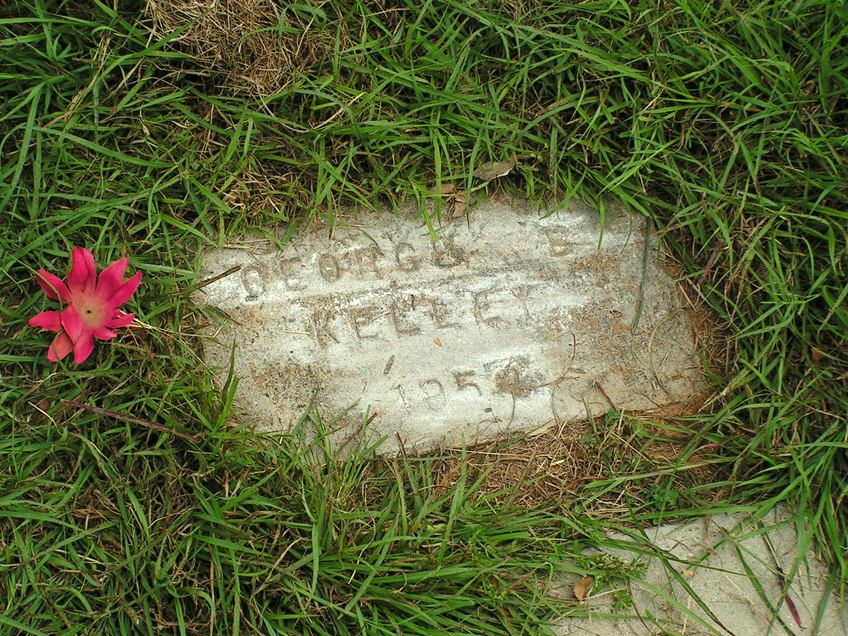
Gravestone, marked "George B. Kelley"

Machine Gun Kelly spent his remaining 21 years in prison. During his time at Alcatraz, he got the nickname "Pop Gun Kelly". According to fellow inmate Dale Stamphill, the nickname originated because "He told big fish stories. The cons called him 'Pop Gun Kelly' after cork guns that were popular with kids ... the guys didn't take him seriously ..." This may have stemmed from the fact that, in addition to his exaggerated tall tales, Kelly was a model prisoner and did not act like the brutal gangster his wife, the media, and FBI had made him out to be. He spent 17 years on Alcatraz as inmate number 117, working in the prison industries, continuing to boast and exaggerate his past escapades to other inmates, and was quietly transferred back to Leavenworth in 1951. He died of a heart attack at Leavenworth on July 18, 1954, his 59th birthday, and was buried at Cottondale Texas Cemetery in Kathryn Kelly's stepfather's family plot with a small headstone marked "George B. Kelley 1954". Kathryn Kelly was released from prison in 1958 and lived in relative anonymity in Oklahoma under the assumed name "Lera Cleo Kelly" until her death in 1985 at the age of 81.

== In popular culture ==
Machine Gun Kelly and his crimes are portrayed in films such as Machine-Gun Kelly (1958), The FBI Story (1959) and Melvin Purvis: G-Man (1974).

Crime novelist Ace Atkins' 2010 book Infamous is based on the Urschel kidnapping and on George and Kathryn Kelly. Kelly is, along with Pretty Boy Floyd and Baby Face Nelson, one of the main characters of the comic book series Pretty, Baby, Machine.

Rapper Colson Baker, known professionally as Machine Gun Kelly and mgk, drew his stage name from Kelly.
