= Ma Barker's Killer Brood =

- Theatrical poster
- Directed by: Bill Karn
- Written by: F. Paul Hall
- Produced by: William Faris; Bill Karn
- Starring: Lurene Tuttle; Tristam Coffin; Paul Dubov; Nelson Leigh; Myrna Dell; Dan White; Eric Sinclair; Robert Kendall
- Cinematography: Clark Ramsey
- Music by: Gene Kauer
- Distributed by: Filmservice Distributors Corporation
- Release date: June 1960
- Running time: 88 minutes
- Country: United States
- Language: English

Ma Barker's Killer Brood is a 1960 American neo noir crime film, released in 1960. The low-budget film was directed by Bill Karn and starred Lurene Tuttle as the title character, Ma Barker.

The film is a highly fictionalized account of the life of Ma Barker and her four sons, whose Barker-Karpis gang terrorized the Southern United States and the Midwestern United States in the 1930s with a string of kidnappings, robberies, and murders. The gang members are also depicted working with other well-known criminals of the era, including John Dillinger (Eric Sinclair), and Baby Face Nelson (Robert Kendall).

== Plot ==
To the horror of her husband, Kate Barker, known as "Ma," teaches her four young sons to steal money from the collection plate in church. Her husband tries to convince her to stop using her sons to commit crimes, but is ignored. Ma expresses her contempt for "sissies" and says that "guts" is the only virtue. Her husband leaves her when their sensitive son Herman is arrested after Ma forces him to rob a fun fair. After this, the local sheriff runs Ma Barker and her boys out of town.

Years later, she has become a hardened criminal along with her sons. She is known in the underworld for her ruthlessness and efficiency in planning "jobs." At a party she hosts for leading criminals Machine Gun Kelly, encouraged by his brash girlfriend Lou, claims he can work without her. Ma is dismissive. After Kelly's independent attempt at a kidnapping fails, Ma belittles Lou. Lou plans revenge. Meanwhile psychopathic killer Alvin Karpis is introduced to the gang. Ma uses him to get rid of weaklings and threats. Ma's drunken new husband Arthur Dunlop is murdered when he blabs about their activities, as is corrupt mob-doctor, Dr. Guelffe.

After a failed robbery Herman shoots himself to avoid capture by the police. Ma is embittered, but plans a major kidnapping that will make the gang rich. She kidnaps wealthy banker, Mr. Khortney. Lou and Kelly discover Ma's hideout and plan to take the kidnap victim from her by force, to collect the ransom themselves, but they are outmaneuvered when Ma reveals she has Baby Face Nelson and John Dillinger with her. The kidnap money is collected, but now the FBI are after the gang. Knowing that Ma's son Doc Barker is attracted to her, Lou seduces him in order to bring him over to her side, but her plan is foiled when the FBI arrest him. They discover a letter that reveals Ma's whereabouts. At a house with her son Fred, she is surrounded by four agents. Fred wants to surrender, but she refuses, and guns down two agents with a Tommy gun. The other agents open fire, killing Fred. Ma strides out with a blazing gun, and is cut down.

== Cast ==
- Lurene Tuttle (Katherine Clark 'Ma' Barker)
- Tristram Coffin (Arthur Dunlop)
- Paul Dubov (Alvin Karpis)
- Nelson Leigh (George Barker)
- Myrna Dell (Lou, Kelly's Girl)
- Victor Lundin (Machine Gun Kelly)
- Don Grady (Herman as a Boy)
- Gary Ammann (Doc as a Boy)
- Donald Towers (Lloyd as a Boy)
- Michael Smith (Fred as a Boy)
- Don Spruance (Herman Barker)
- Ron Foster (Doc Barker) aka (Austin Bennett)
- Roye Baker (Lloyd Barker)
- Eric Morris (Fred Barker)
- Byron Foulger (Dr. Guelffe)
- Eric Sinclair (John Dillinger)
- Robert Kendall (Baby Face Nelson)
- Irene Windust (Mrs. Khortney)
- John McNamara (Mr. Khortney)
- Dan Riss (Baxter)
- Rex Holman (Lloyd)

== Production notes ==
The character of "Dr. Guelffe" is based on Joseph P. Moran; the wealthy banker character, "Mr. Khortney," is based on Edward Bremer.

== See also ==
- Bloody Mama (1970) another highly fictionalized film account of the Barker-Karpis gang, directed by Roger Corman
- Big Bad Mama (1975) also by Roger Corman, about a mother-turned-gangster
