= Fred Barker =

American criminal (1901–1935)

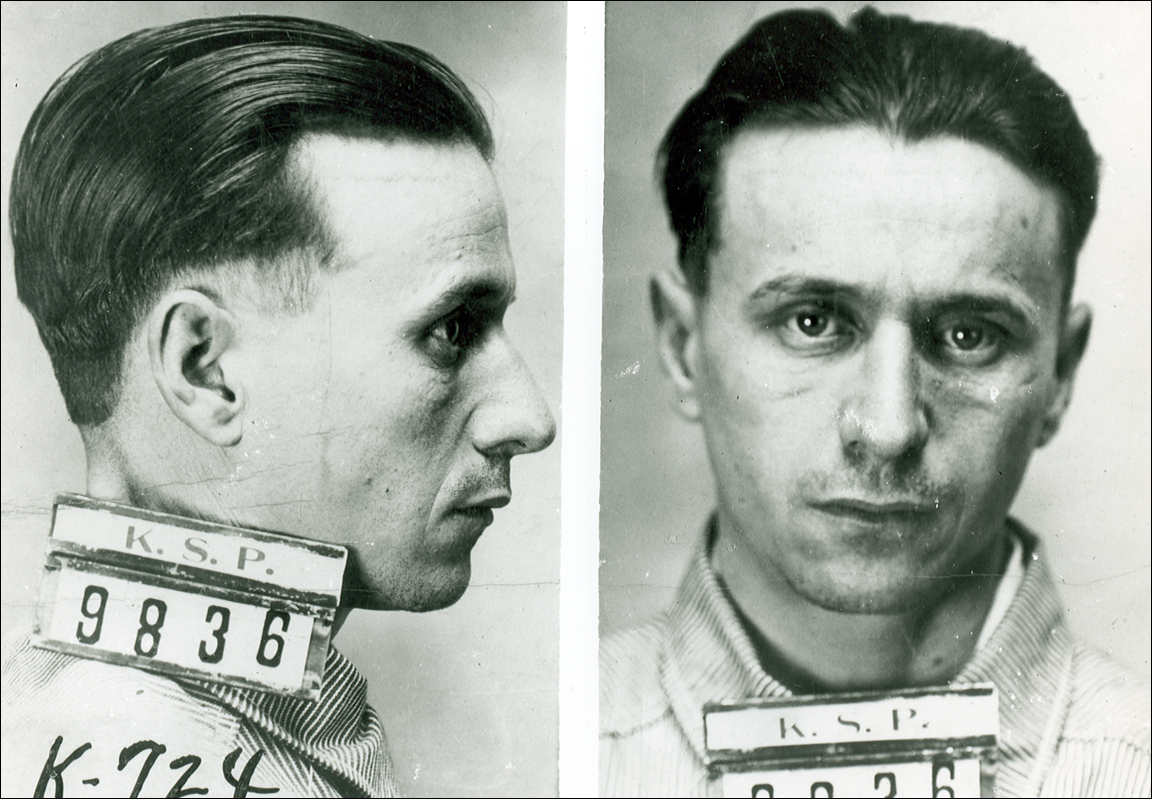
- Mugshot of Barker
- Born: December 12, 1901; Aurora, Missouri, U.S.
- Died: January 16, 1935 (aged 33); Ocklawaha, Florida, U.S.
- Cause of death: Gunshot wounds
- Resting place: Olivet Memorial Park, Colma, California, U.S.
- Occupations: Gangster, criminal
- Parent(s): George Elias Barker; Arizona "Ma" Barker
- Status: Deceased
- Conviction: Robbery

Frederick George Barker (December 12, 1901 – January 16, 1935) was an American criminal who, along with Alvin Karpis, co-founded the Barker–Karpis Gang, which committed numerous robberies, murders and kidnappings during the 1930s. Barker was the youngest son of Ma Barker, all of whose children were criminals. He was killed in a lengthy gunfight with the Federal Bureau of Investigation (FBI) in 1935.

== Early life ==
Fred Barker was born to George Elias and Arizona Donnie Clark "Ma" Barker in Aurora, Missouri on December 12, 1901. The family moved to Tulsa, Oklahoma, in 1912. Barker's older brothers Herman, Lloyd and Arthur were committing crimes throughout his childhood, belonging to a gang of local delinquent youths called the Central Park Gang. The gang met in the park to plan crimes and stash their stolen goods. There, Barker met future members of the Barker-Karpis gang, including Volney Davis. He was first arrested and imprisoned in 1927 for burglary. While in prison he met Alvin Karpis. According to Karpis, Barker was a dominant figure in jail who was able to obtain marijuana and other perks. Karpis also said he was a "natural born killer" who "never hesitated". Unlike Karpis (nicknamed "Creepy Karpis"), Barker was known for his personal charm. He was released in 1930.

== Gang ==
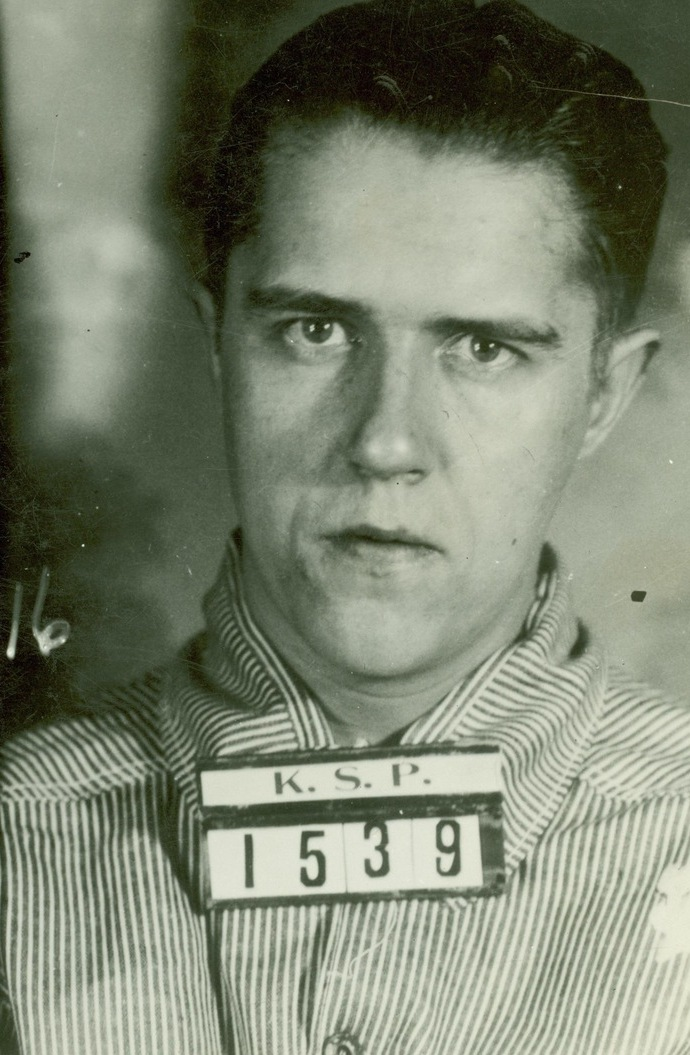
Fred's closest associate Alvin Karpis

After their release, Barker and Karpis joined up to commit a string of burglaries in Kansas, often collaborating with other local criminals. Several notable gangsters joined the Barkers in various crimes, including Harvey Bailey, Frank Nash, Fred Goetz, and Dr. Joseph Moran. They were accompanied by Ma Barker and her boyfriend, Arthur Dunlop (sometimes called Dunlap).

Things became difficult for the gang when they were confronted by Sheriff C. Roy Kelly in December 1931. Karpis and Barker shot and killed Kelly, an act that forced them to flee the area. The two had also probably killed an Arkansas police chief, Manley Jackson, a month earlier, but had avoided suspicion at the time. The gang relocated to Minnesota, where, in 1932, Barker, his brother Arthur, Karpis, and Lawrence DeVol robbed Third Northwestern National Bank in Minneapolis. DeVol killed policemen Ira Leon Evans and Leo Gorski during the escape, while Barker murdered Oscar Erickson, a passing motorist. Barker and Karpis were also suspected of killing Dunlop, an alcoholic whom they considered to be untrustworthy after someone tipped police to the gang's hideout. According to other gang members, Dunlop was also abusive to Ma.

Around this time Barker started a relationship with Paula Harmon, widow of bank robber Charles Harmon. Karpis did not approve of Paula, considering her to be a "drunk" and a "rotten choice, though you couldn't tell that to Freddie".

=== Kidnappings ===
The gang became nationally notorious in 1933-34, when they organized the kidnappings of local businessmen William Hamm and Edward Bremer. The crimes were orchestrated by racketeers Jack Peifer and Harry Sawyer with inside information about police activity being provided by corrupt officer Tom Brown, who ran the "Kidnap Squad". Arthur carried out the kidnappings with a different accomplice each time. During the Bremer kidnapping, Barker nearly shot dead the victim when the ransom was not paid promptly. They netted $100,000 for the first victim and twice that for the second.

With the Federal Bureau of Investigation (FBI) in pursuit, Barker and Karpis attempted to get plastic surgery to alter their appearance and remove their fingerprints. The procedure was carried out by Moran, an underworld doctor. The operations were so painful that Fred asked one of his friends to shoot him to stop the pain, but his friend refused. Moran disappeared shortly thereafter. A badly decomposed body was discovered a year later washed up from Lake Erie on Crystal Beach, Ontario, Canada. Police identified it as Moran. In 1971, Karpis wrote in his autobiography that the identification was mistaken; he claimed that Moran had been murdered by the Barkers and then buried in a lime pit in Michigan. The most accepted version of the tale is that Karpis and Fred Barker took Moran on a boat ride on Lake Erie, during which they both murdered him. He was killed either for his botched surgery or for shooting his mouth off about the gang in a brothel. The last time Moran was seen alive was at a brothel in which he drunkenly bragged, "I have you guys in the palm of my hand". He left the bar with Karpis and Barker and was never seen again.

After this the gang attempted to launder the ransom money, though this proved to be difficult because the serial numbers had been recorded by the FBI, a fact that soon became known to the gang. While Harry Sawyer traveled to Cuba to launder the money, his wife Gladys and Fred's girlfriend Paula were arrested for drunk and disorderly behavior at a hotel in Cleveland, Ohio. Paula had a mental breakdown while being questioned and was returned to her family in Texas. Barker moved to Cuba with his brother, his mother, and Karpis. However, they soon relocated to Florida after Karpis became concerned that the money had not been adequately laundered. They rented a lakeside property in Ocklawaha under the pseudonym "Blackburn", claiming to be a mother and sons wanting to vacation in a country retreat.

Arthur soon left Florida for Chicago. Karpis also moved on, leaving Fred and Ma in the house. FBI agents caught up with them after Arthur was spotted and arrested in Chicago on January 8, 1935. A map found in his possession indicated that other gang members were in Ocklawaha, but did not identify the address. The FBI soon located the house at which they were staying after identifying references to a local alligator named "Old Joe" and questioning locals about newcomers.

== Death ==
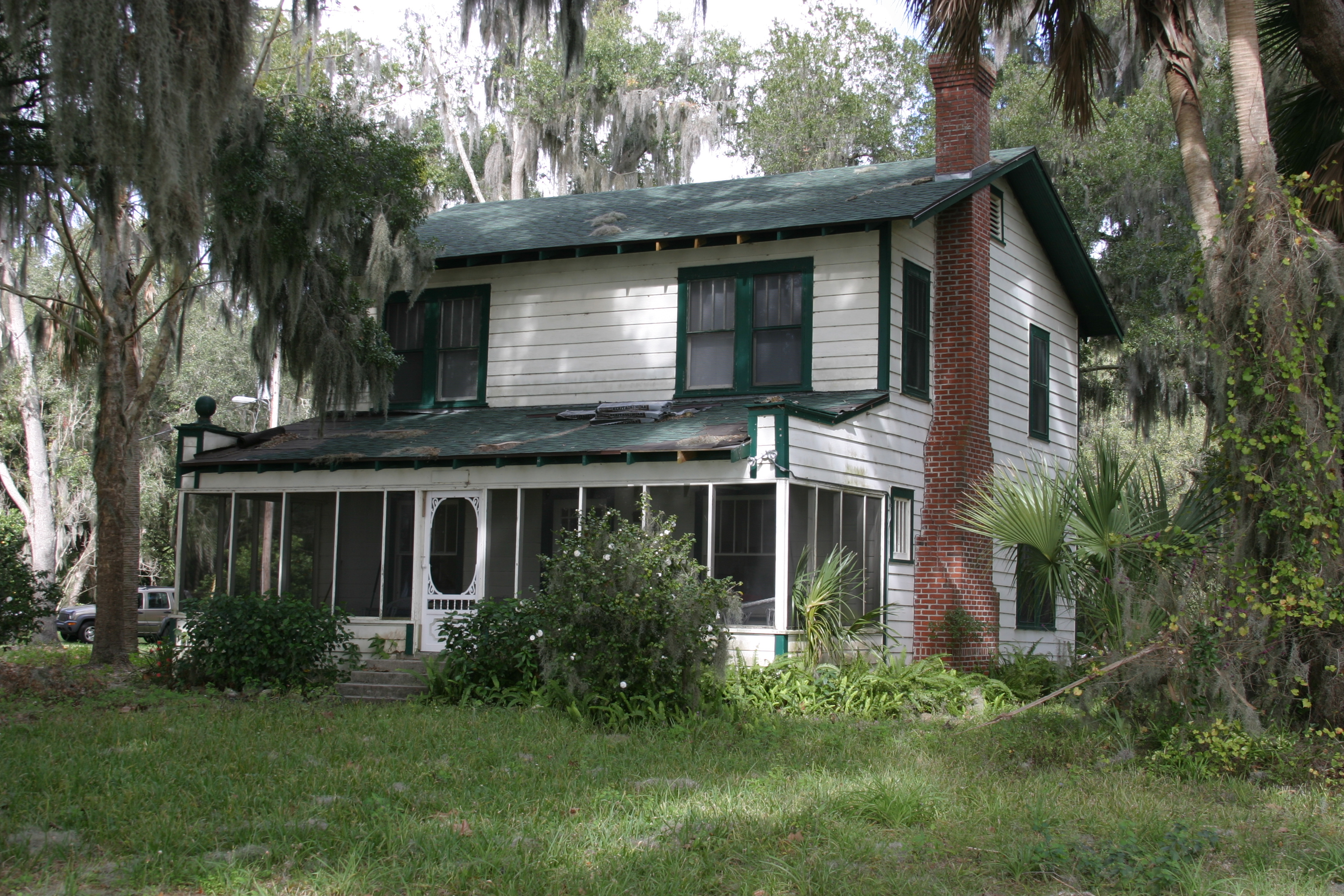
Fred and Ma Barker died in the upper left bedroom of this house beside Lake Weir in Florida. 29.041319°N 81.933408°W

Agents surrounded the house at 13250 East Highway C-25 on the morning of January 16, 1935. Unknown to the FBI, Karpis and other gang members had left three days before, leaving only Fred and Ma Barker in the house. Ordered to surrender, Fred opened fire. The resulting firefight lasted for about fifteen minutes. The FBI agents retreated to a safe distance, but lobbed smoke bombs into the house. Gunfire continued to come from the house, and Fred and Ma apparently moved from room to room, as shots came from different windows. The FBI returned fire. Allegedly, many local people came to watch the events unfolding, even holding picnics during the gun battle. Gunfire ceased coming from the house after five hours; the FBI ordered local estate-handyman Willie Woodbury to enter the house wearing a bulletproof vest. Woodbury reported that the occupants were dead.

Both bodies were found in the same front bedroom. Fred Barker's body was riddled with bullets, but Ma appeared to have died from a single bullet wound. A Thompson submachine gun was lying between the bodies of Ma and Fred. Their bodies were put on public display, and then stored unclaimed, until October 1, 1935, when relatives had them buried—at Williams Timberhill Cemetery in Welch, Oklahoma—next to the body of Herman Barker, who had died in 1927. On January 20, four days after his death, Paula Harmon was committed to the Rusk State Hospital for insanity in Rusk, Texas.

== Media ==
- In the 1957 docudrama Guns Don't Argue, Fred is played by Sam Edwards.
- Fred is portrayed by Joe Di Reda in "Ma Barker and Her Boys", an episode of 1959 TV series The Untouchables, which pits federal agent Eliot Ness against the Barker clan, and fictionally depicts Ness as leading the assault on Ma Barker and her sons at their Florida hideout. In this version, Lloyd, Fred and Arthur are all present at the final shootout. Fred is portrayed as the most devoted to his mother. He shoots Lloyd when he tries to give up. In reality Lloyd was in prison throughout the career of the Barker-Karpis gang.
- In The FBI Story, he is portrayed by Alan Craig.
- Fred is played by Eric Morris in Ma Barker's Killer Brood (1960). In this version, in the final shootout he is revealed to be a coward who wants to surrender, but Ma refuses to let him.
- In Bloody Mama (1970) he is portrayed by Robert Walden. In this version he is the weakest member of the family and is involved in a homosexual relationship with "Kevin Dirkman" (a fictionalized version of Karpis, who was still alive at the time).
- In Public Enemies (1996) he is portrayed by Gavin Harrison.
