= Fred Goetz =

American mobster

- Born: February 14, 1897; Chicago, Illinois, U.S.
- Died: March 21, 1934 (aged 37); Chicago, Illinois, U.S.
- Cause of death: Gunshot wounds
- Resting place: Irving Park Cemetery
- Education: Lane Technical College Prep High School; University of Illinois Urbana-Champaign
- Occupation: Businessman
- Parent(s): Samuel T. Goetz; Ottillie Bensel

Fred Samuel Goetz (February 14, 1897 – March 21, 1934), also known as "Shotgun" George Ziegler, was a Chicago Outfit mobster and a suspected participant in the Saint Valentine's Day Massacre, in 1929.

== Early life ==
Goetz was born in Chicago to Samuel T. Goetz and his wife Ottillie Bensel, who both emigrated from Germany and moved to 1338 Eddy Street in the Wrigleyville enclave of Lake View. Ottillie bore Samuel two children: Fred and Sophie. Goetz graduated from Lane Technical College Prep High School in 1914. After graduating from Lane Tech, he went on to attend the University of Illinois and graduated in 1918 having earned a degree in engineering. Following his graduation from the U of I, Fred enlisted in the US Army and after basic training was stationed at Langley Field, Virginia, during World War I, as a pilot in the United States Army Aviation Branch where he rose to the rank of second lieutenant.

== Criminal career ==
By 1922, Goetz worked as a lifeguard at Clarendon Municipal Bathing Beach in the neighbourhood of Beach Park, Illinois, until he was charged with sexually assaulting seven-year-old Jean Lanbert by an alley near her house where she lived in Edgewater, Chicago. Goetz denied the charges and jumped bail on June 10, 1925. Four months later, Roger Bessner implicated Goetz in a failed robbery of Dr. Henry R. Gross, in which the family chauffeur was killed. On October 20, 1925, the Illinois State Attorney had a lawsuit brought against Fred's parents, Samuel and Ottillie, who scheduled some of their empty real estate property to be used as collateral for their son's bond. They would later divorce, his mother moving to 1503 Ardmore Avenue in Edgewater, Chicago, and his father Samuel relocating to Cincinnati.

During the next several years, Goetz would become associates with underworld figures such as Joseph Weil and Morris Klineman, as well as participating in several armed robberies, including the robbery of $352,000 from the Farmers and Merchants Bank, in Jefferson, Wisconsin, with Gus Winkler and four others, in 1929. He lived in an apartment at 7827 South Shore Drive in South Shore, Chicago, with his wife Irene. His landlady would describe Fred and his wife as "fine people" and that Fred was a "very brilliant and handsome man".

=== Barker gang ===
After the Saint Valentine's Day Massacre, Goetz left Chicago and began bootlegging operations in Kansas City, Missouri.

Goetz eventually became associated with the Barker-Karpis gang. He participated in several bank robberies with Alvin Karpis, Fred Barker, and Doc Barker.

One of the most violent of the armed robberies in which Goetz participated with the Barkers was carried out at the post office in South St. Paul, Minnesota on August 30, 1933. The robbery resulted in the theft of a $33,000 Swift and Company payroll, the murder of South St. Paul police officer Leo Pavlak and the permanent maiming of South St. Paul police officer John Yeaman.

The Barker-Karpis Gang then went on a shooting spree before fleeing the scene of the robbery.

According to a report by the Minnesota Bureau of Criminal Apprehension, "The bandits put on a Jesse James exhibition by shooting up and down Concord St., shooting about a dozen shots into the Postal Building and across the street. These bandits used a Thompson submachine gun and a sawed-off shotgun with which they did their shooting, and it is a miracle that no one else was shot and wounded. They appeared to be cool and reckless, not giving a damn who they shot."

Goetz is alleged to have returned to Chicago and been one of the gunmen in the October 9, 1933 murder of his former friend and associate Gus Winkler.

Goetz then conspired with the Barker Gang in the 1934 kidnapping of St. Paul, Minnesota banking millionaire Edward G. Bremer. Goetz collected the ransom and released Bremer.

FBI chief J. Edgar Hoover later publicly accused Ma Barker of masterminding the Bremer kidnapping. According to Twin Cities historian Paul Maccabee, FBI files on the case reveal that it was Goetz, rather than Ma Barker, who directed both the Hamm and Bremer kidnappings on behalf of St. Paul crime bosses Harry Sawyer and Jack Peifer, as well as mobbed up former St. Paul police chief Big Tom Brown.

However, Goetz loved to brag over drinks to fellow wiseguys in Chicago pubs about his involvement in the Bremer kidnapping and even hinted about the names of his co-conspirators and the hiding place of the ransom money.

== Murder ==
On March 20, 1934, Goetz walked outside The Minerva Cafe in the mob-controlled Chicago suburb of Cicero, and was shot in the face by a shotgun at close range. He was taken to the Frances E. Willard National Temperance Hospital, but died from his wounds. His body had to be identified by fingerprints.

Goetz's expensive coupe was found in Greater Grand Crossing, Chicago, and it was believed to have been abandoned there by his wife Irene, who along with Fred was a wanted fugitive by the FBI.

The culprit, or culprits, in Goetz's murder remain unknown. The newspapers suggested that the Barker gang had murdered Goetz rather than pay him his cut of the ransom money. In his memoirs, former Barker gang leader Alvin Karpis, while insisting that the Chicago Outfit was responsible for Goetz's murder, also commented that Goetz had been, "getting kind of gabby", and might have led the FBI to his fellow kidnappers. According to FBI documents, soon after Goetz's murder, Irene Goetz spoke about her husband. Fred Barker overheard her and said coldly, "To hell with George." Meanwhile, Louis Campagna, the Chicago Outfit made man and caporegime responsible for running operations in Cicero, later told his friends that Fred Goetz got whacked because, "the St. Paul Outfit", likely meaning Harry Sawyer, "put him on the spot".

Fred Goetz is buried at Irving Park Cemetery in Norridge, Illinois.

== See also ==
- List of homicides in Illinois § Organized crime
- List of unsolved murders (1900–1979)
