= Olivet Gardens of Cypress Lawn Memorial Park =

Cemetery in San Mateo County, California

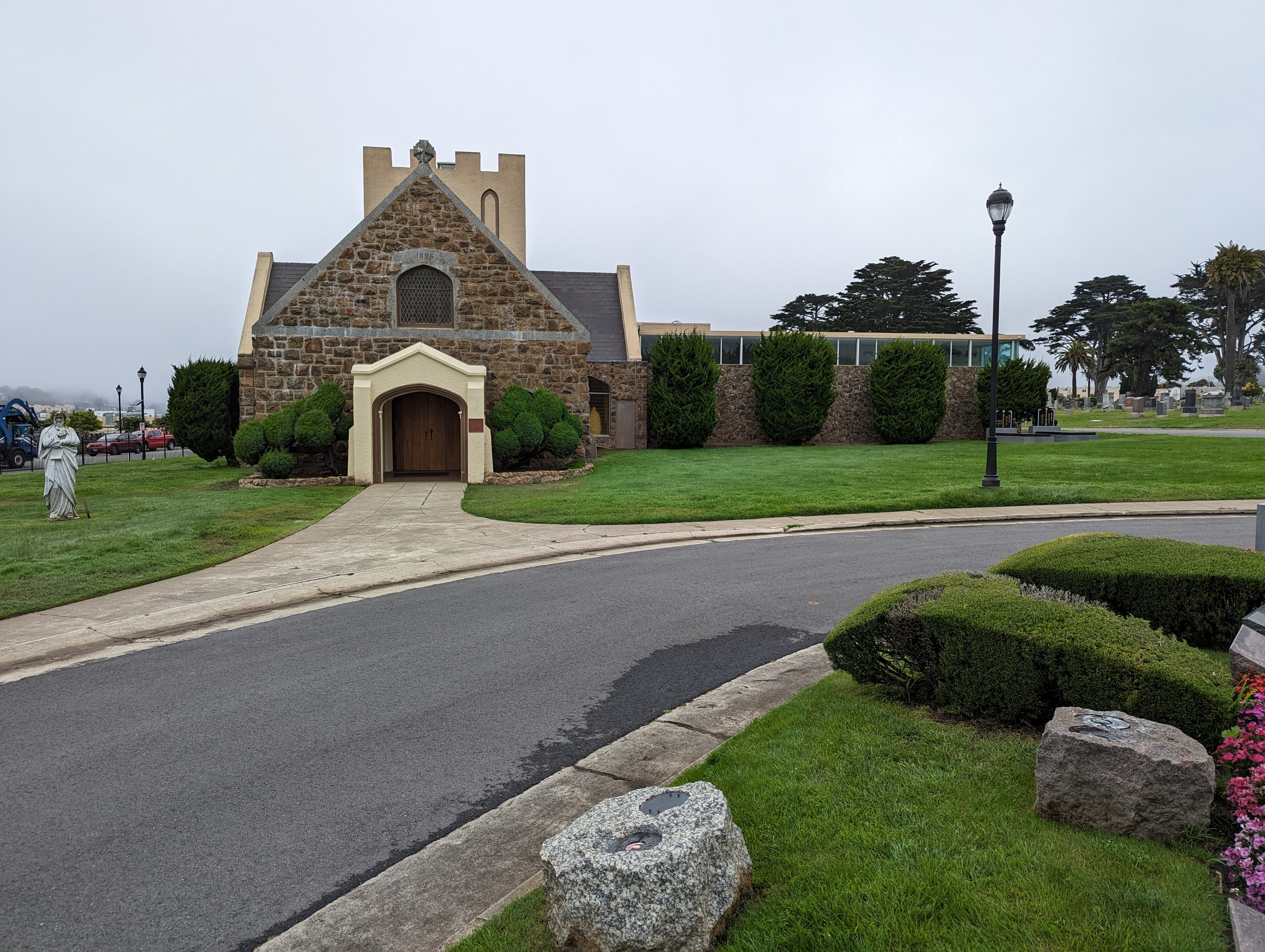
- Mausoleum at Olivet Gardens
- Interactive map of Olivet Gardens of Cypress Lawn Memorial Park

Details
- Established: July 1896; 129 years ago
- Location: Colma, California
- Country: United States
- Coordinates: 37°40′55″N 122°27′17″W
- Type: Non-sectarian
- Owned by: Cypress Lawn Memorial Park
- Website: cypresslawn.com/about/memorial-park/olivet/
- Find a Grave: Olivet Gardens of Cypress Lawn Memorial Park

Olivet Gardens of Cypress Lawn Memorial Park was founded in 1896, originally as Mount Olivet Cemetery, and is located at 1601 Hillside Boulevard in Colma, California. Its name was later changed to Olivet Memorial Park, and updated again to its current name following its acquisition by Cypress Lawn Memorial Park in 2020.

== History ==
Work on the 210-acre (85 ha) Mount Olivet Cemetery site was announced in November 1895; it was planned to be a non-sectarian cemetery on the western slopes of San Bruno Mountain which would be subdivided into sections reserved for fraternal organizations such as the Native Sons of the Golden West, Knights of Pythias, Improved Order of Red Men, and Ancient Order of Foresters. The site adjoins the older Hills of Eternity and Home of Peace Jewish cemeteries, separated by Hillside Boulevard, which was then known as San Bruno Avenue. At the time, it was the largest cemetery in California. The first interments were conducted in July 1896.

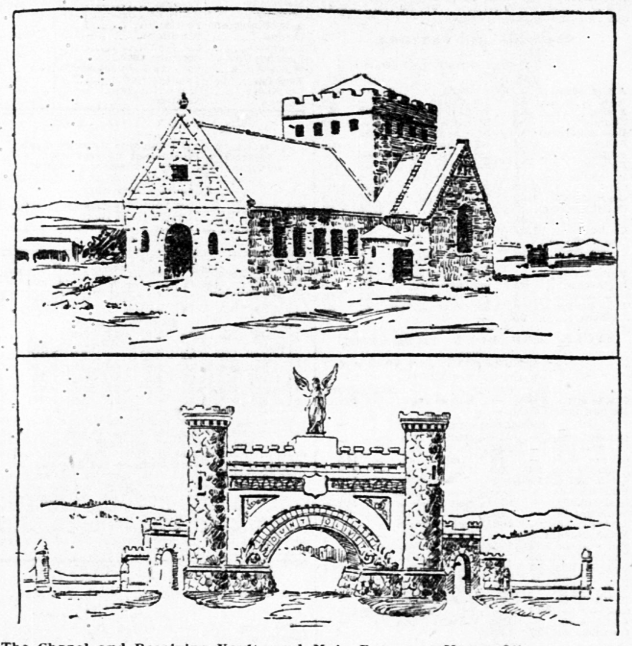
Drawings of Chapel and Receiving Vaults (top) and Main entrance (bottom), published in 1896

A branch line of the San Francisco and San Mateo Electric Railway was completed for Mount Olivet in 1898. By that time, the debate on keeping cemeteries within San Francisco had begun to trend toward relocating the dead, and the development of Mount Olivet and Cypress Lawn in Colma was given as evidence that community "will probably be made the receptacle for all the dead of [San Francisco] in the very near future." The San Francisco Board of Supervisors passed a measure in 1902, banning new interments within city limits.

The oldest buildings onsite include the stone chapel (1896) and columbarium (1915), both designed by William H. Crim Jr.

There are two large memorials at Olivet. One is dedicated to the Sailors' Union of the Pacific by Governor Earl Warren in 1946 in memory of the 6,000 United States Merchant Marine sailors who died in World War II. Another is named "Circus Showfolks of America Memorial" and "Showman's Rest", erected by the Showfolks of America commissioned in 1945 by the Showfolks of America after it started holding annual meetings in San Francisco.

By that time, when Robert Royston was engaged to perform landscape architecture for the site, the name had been changed to Olivet Memorial Park. The cemetery was acquired by Cypress Lawn Memorial Park in 2020 and renamed to Olivet Gardens.

== Notable burials ==
- Arthur Barker (1899–1939), son of Ma Barker and member of the Barker-Karpis gang shot and killed in attempt an escape from Alcatraz Island
- Joseph Bowers (1896–1936), first man to attempt an escape from Alcatraz Island, shot and killed
- Virginia Brissac (1883–1979), actress
- Marguerite De La Motte (1902–1950), actress
- John J. De Haven (1845–1913), judge and congressman
- Danniebelle Hall (1938–2000), musician
- Ishi (1860–1916), last member of the Yahi people
- Harry Lundeberg (1901–1957), American labor leader
- Stephen A. Douglas Puter (1857–1931), criminal and author
- Gus Suhr (1906–2004), Major League Baseball player
- Samuel D. Woods (1845–1915), American politician
Olivet Gardens

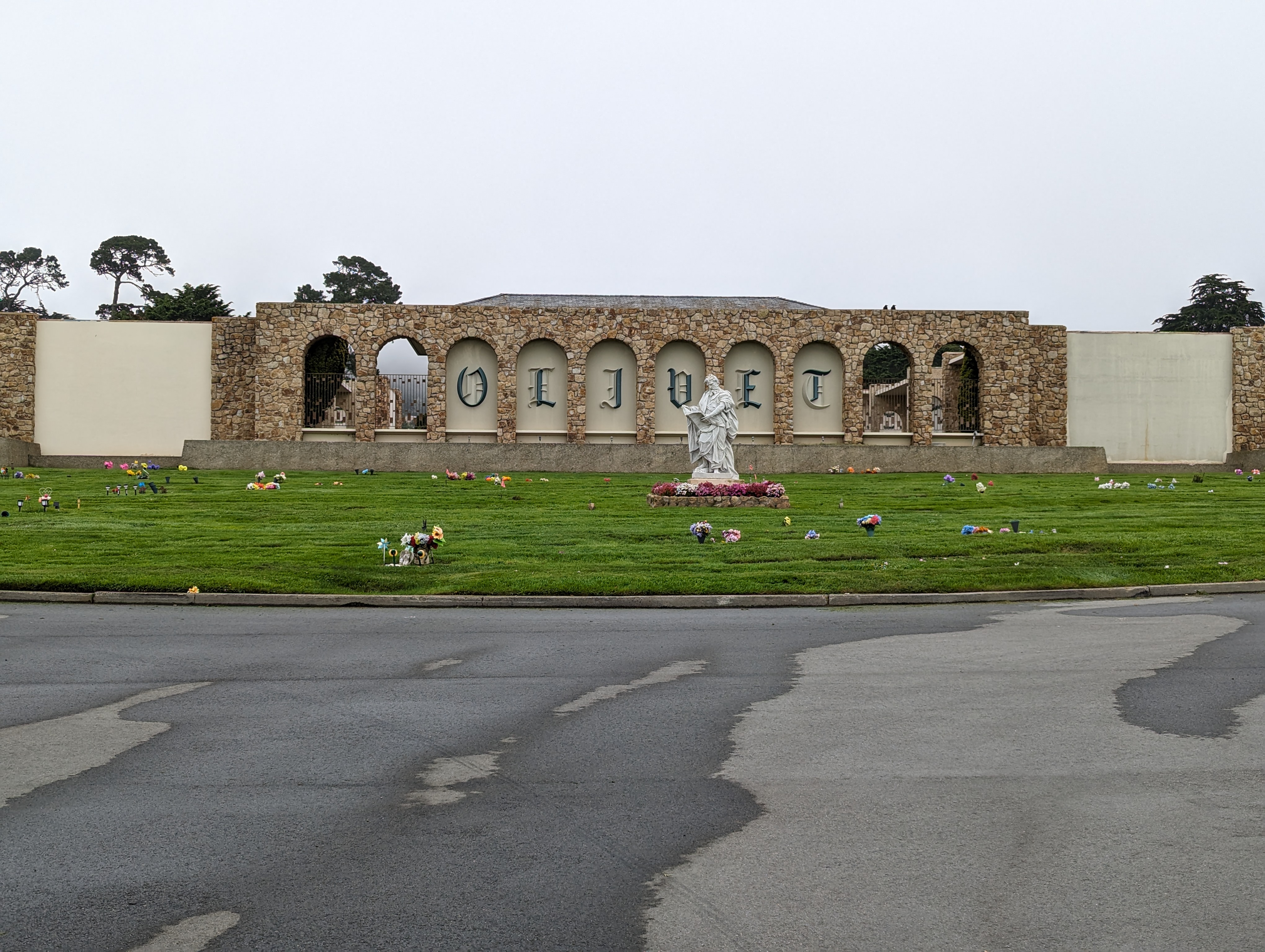
Garden mausoleum and sign, near entrance

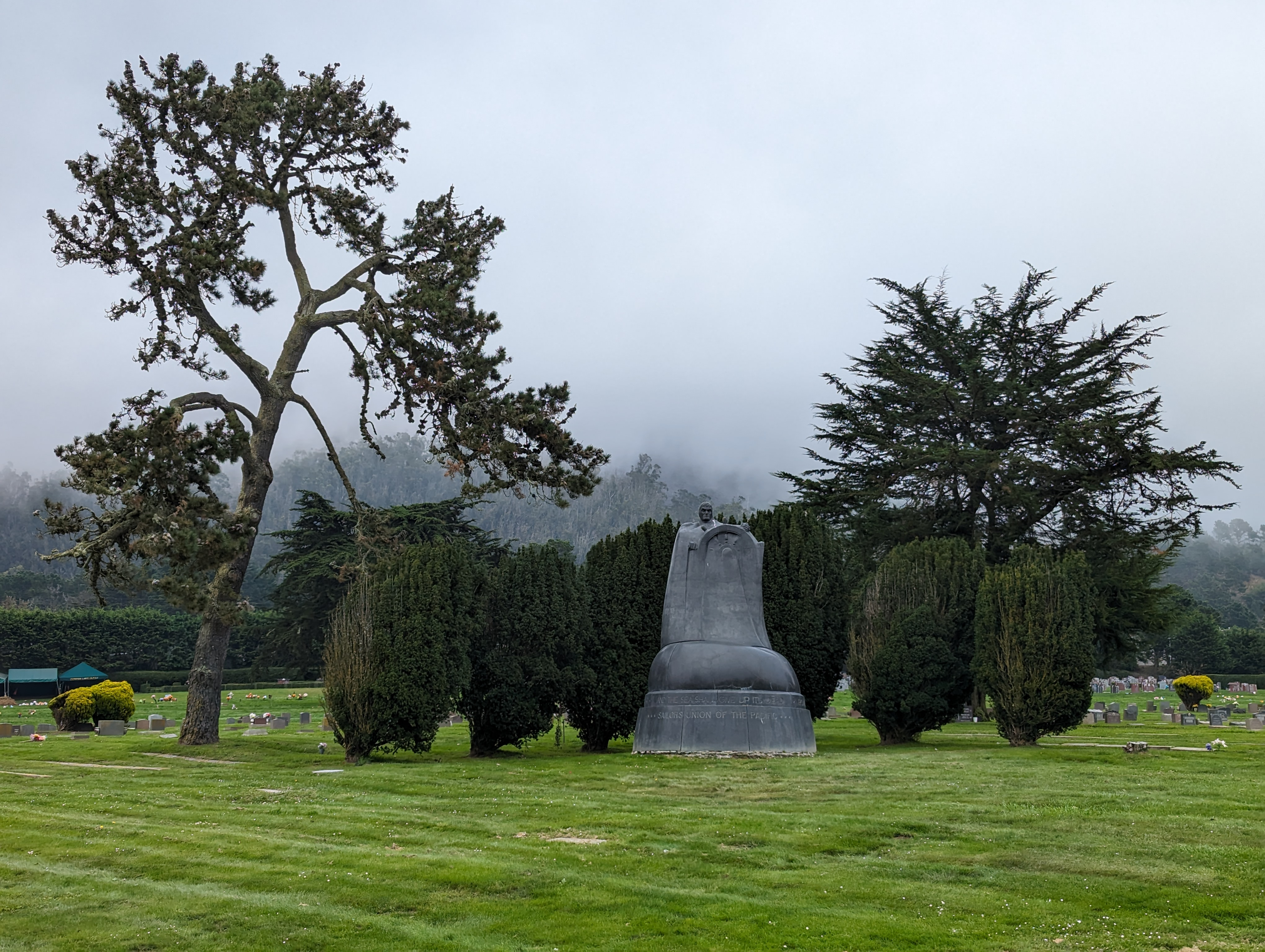
Sailors Union memorial (John Stoll, 1946)

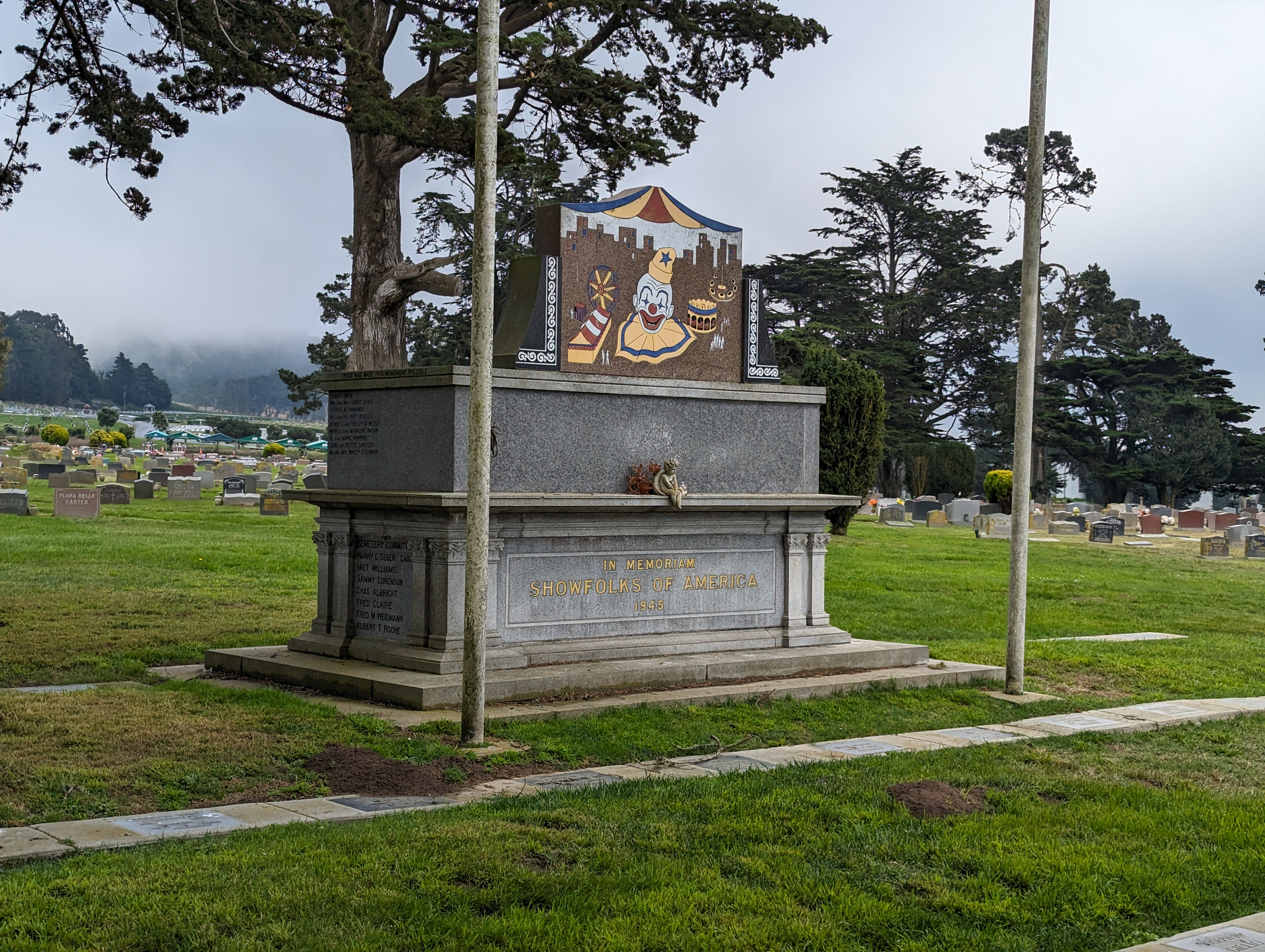
Showman's Rest

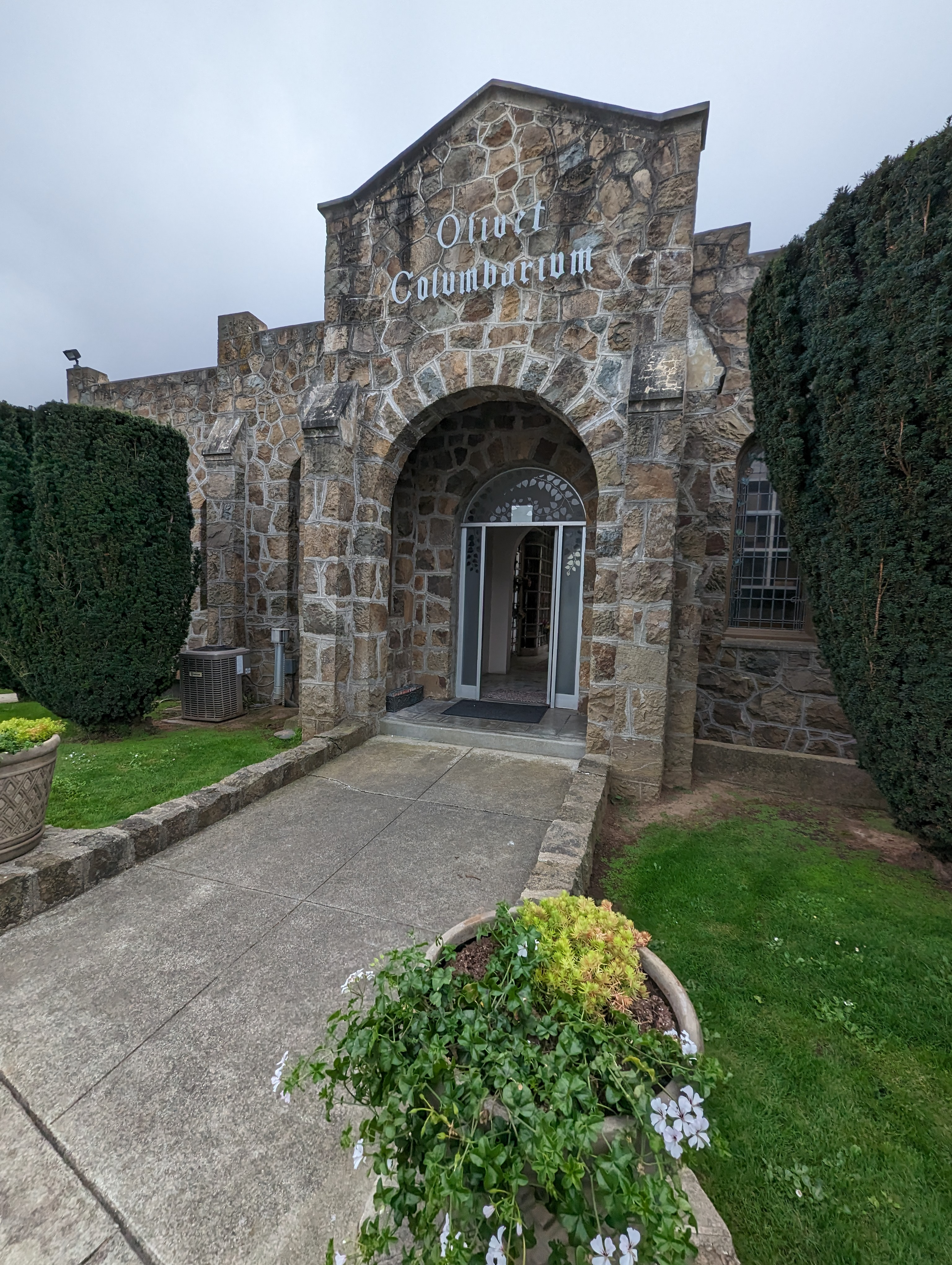
Entrance to columbarium

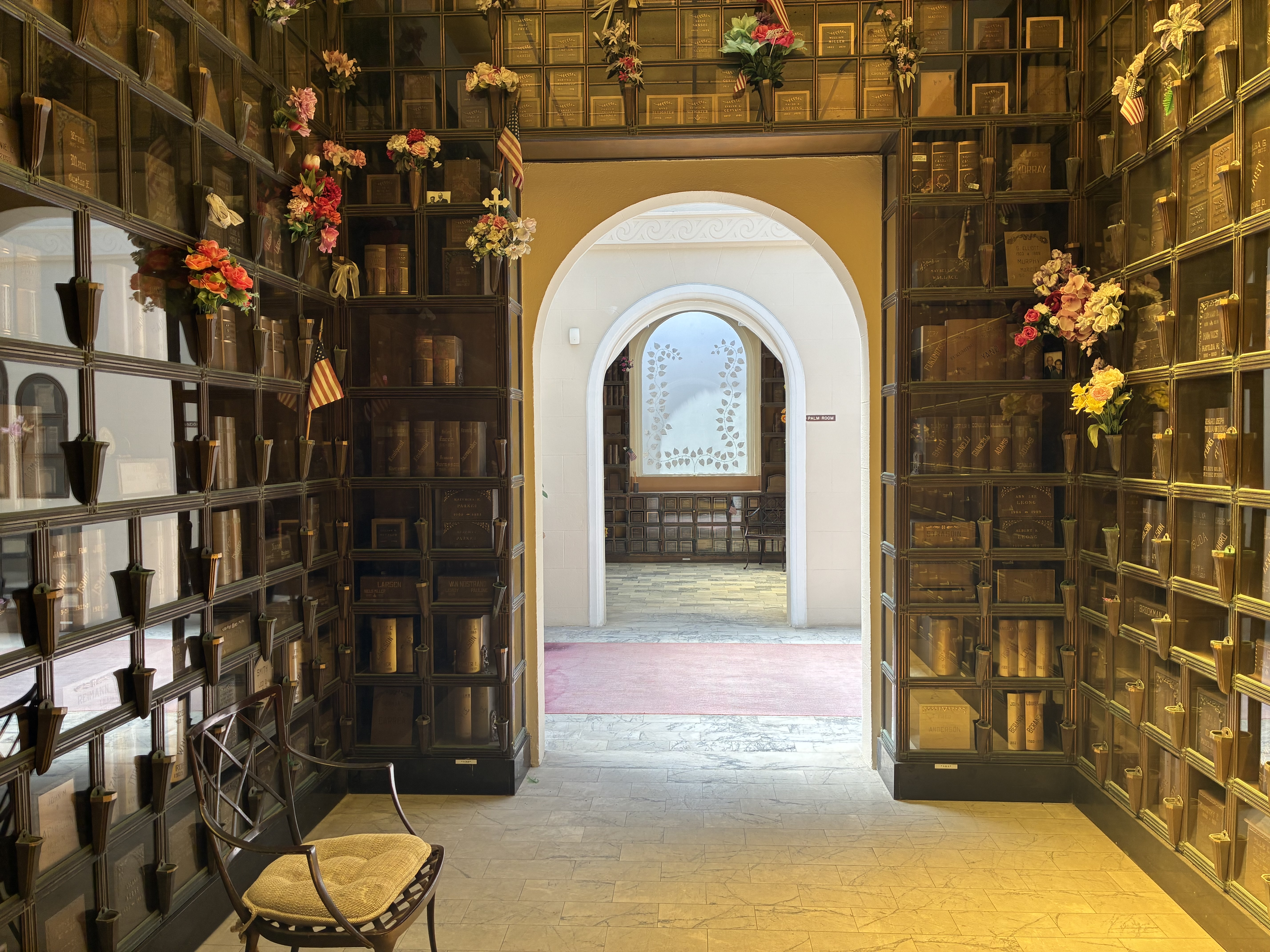
Interior of the columbarium

== See also ==
- List of cemeteries in California
