= Bloody Mama =

1970 film

- Theatrical release poster
- Directed by: Roger Corman
- Screenplay by: Robert Thom
- Story by: Robert Thom; Don Peters
- Produced by: Roger Corman
- Starring: Shelley Winters; Pat Hingle; Don Stroud; Diane Varsi; Bruce Dern; Clint Kimbrough; Robert De Niro; Robert Walden
- Cinematography: John A. Alonzo
- Edited by: Eve Newman
- Music by: Don Randi
- Production company: American International Pictures
- Distributed by: American International Pictures
- Release date: March 24, 1970
- Running time: 90 minutes
- Country: United States
- Language: English
- Box office: $1,542,000 (US/ Canada rentals); 152,310 admissions (France)

Bloody Mama is a 1970 American exploitation crime film directed by Roger Corman, starring Shelley Winters in the title role, and Bruce Dern, Don Stroud, Robert Walden, Alex Nicol and Robert De Niro in supporting roles. It is loosely based on the real-life story of Ma Barker, who is depicted as a corrupt, mentally-disturbed mother who encourages and organizes the criminality of her four adult sons in Depression-era southern United States. Corman considered the film one of his favorites in his filmography.

== Plot ==
In rural Arkansas during the Depression, middle-aged Kate 'Ma' Barker, disturbed by the childhood incestuous rape that she experienced by her father and brothers, also brutalizes those around her while indulging in her monstrous sexual appetites. She is devoted to her four adult sons, pragmatic Arthur, sadistic Herman, homosexual Fred and loyal, drug-addicted Lloyd. Kate decides to leave her husband George and her Arkansas home to embark on a robbery-murder spree with her four sons.

When Herman and Fred are arrested and imprisoned for petty theft charges, Kate leads Arthur and Lloyd on a bank-robbery spree to raise the money to free her sons from jail. The gang is joined by gunman Kevin Dirkman, Fred's older cellmate who became his lover while incarcerated. Also accompanying them is a local prostitute, Mona Gibson, whom Herman frequented before his imprisonment.

While hiding out at a cabin in Kentucky, Lloyd is playfully approached by a young woman named Rembrandt, who swims to him as he dangles his feet in a lake. The encounter begins flirtatiously but quickly turns into rape and abduction after Lloyd shows her the needle marks on his arm. Lloyd tells her that he is a Barker in spite of Ma's warning to use an alias. Not wanting the woman to report their location to the police, the Barkers hold her captive, and Ma kills her by drowning her in the bathtub, despite the protests of her sons. Ma subsequently seduces Kevin, leading Fred to resent her.

After arriving in Tennessee, the gang abducts wealthy businessman Sam Pendlebury and holds him for $300,000 ransom. The sons, particularly Herman, bond with Sam, whom they see as the decent father figure they never had. When Herman and Mona attempt to collect the ransom, they barely escape from a pair of FBI agents. With the ransom eventually paid in full, they plan to leave Sam untied at the hideout, providing them the time to escape before he can talk to the police. Herman wants to see Sam's eyes—which remind him of their father. Sam says that he cannot see because of head trauma.

Ma insists that Sam be killed to avoid his identifying them. Sam is led into the woods to be shot, but the boys, now viewing Herman as leader, set him free, lying to Ma about killing him. To explain the need to leave the territory immediately, Herman tells Ma of the deception and knocks her to the ground, saying that she is no longer the boss.

The gang hides out in the Florida Everglades, where Lloyd dies from a morphine overdose. Mona leaves Herman and the gang after revealing her pregnancy and fearing for the safety of her unborn child. Her fears are justified when Herman and Kevin give away their hiding place. A local handyman and caretaker, Moses, witnesses them shoot an alligator on a lake with a Tommy gun and calls the police to report his suspicions. When asked, he says that their cars have Tennessee plates, and the authorities quickly deduce that these are the Barkers.

A large contingent of FBI agents and local police arrive at the Barkers' hideout and a huge shootout ensues between the authorities and the surviving members of the gang. Kevin, Fred and Arthur are killed (as are many officers). Herman dies by suicide to prevent from being sent to prison again. Kate is the last one to fall, firing her Thompson machine gun at the police, screaming, unable to accept that her boys are dead because of her.

== Cast ==
- Shelley Winters as Kate "Ma" Barker
  - Lisa Linsky as Young Kate Clark
- Bruce Dern as Kevin Dirkman
- Don Stroud as Herman Barker
- Robert Walden as Fred Barker
- Alex Nicol as George Barker, (Kate's Husband)
- Robert De Niro as Lloyd Barker
- Pat Hingle as Sam Pendlebury
- Clint Kimbrough as Arthur Barker
- Diane Varsi as Mona Gibson
- Pamela Dunlap as Rembrandt
- Michael Fox as Dr. Roth
- Scatman Crothers as Moses
- Stacy Harris as Agent McClellan
- Steve Mitchell as Sheriff
- Roy Idom as Ferryboat Passenger
- Frank Snell as Federal Agent (uncredited)

== Production ==
AIP announced that Don Peters was writing a script as early as 1967. The gunman named Kevin is patterned after the historical gunman Alvin Karpis. The wealthy businessman character of Sam Pendlebury is a combination of historical kidnapping victims William Hamm and Edward Bremer, whom the Barker gang kidnapped in 1933 and 1934, respectively. The film was shot entirely in Arkansas. Prior to playing Ma Barker in this film, Winters played "Ma Parker", a villain inspired by Barker, in the 1960s Batman TV series.

== Release ==
=== Box office ===
The film premiered on March 24, 1970, in Little Rock, Arkansas, and was released in 350 theaters in the southern United States, including 65 theaters in Arkansas. The film grossed $1.5 million in U.S. rentals.

=== Critical response ===
The film holds a score of 13%, based on 8 reviews, on Rotten Tomatoes.

Howard Thompson of The New York Times wrote that "Miss Winters is plain wonderful" in the film, which, although similar to Bonnie and Clyde in subject matter, "happens to be more honest and less pretentious, with no grudging admiration for criminal 'rebels'. What hoists the picture into real substance toward the home stretch is an eerie and fascinating by [sic] credible sequence with the Barker clan holding as captive a blindfolded millionaire, strongly played by Pat Hingle".

Peter Schjeldahl, also writing for The New York Times, described the film favorably as a "low budget, unpretentious, extraordinarily brutal little movie about the pathology of 'senseless' murder".

Arthur D. Murphy of Variety wrote, "Corman's production has the naturalistic look sought, but the occasionally poor looping and uneven color and textural qualities add up to a liability. His direction is passive, unpretentious, unambitious and therefore nearly nonexistent."

Gene Siskel of the Chicago Tribune gave the film 1 star out of 4, and called it "92 minutes of sado-masochism, incest, satyrism and voyeurism woven into a disgraceful screenplay ... In fact, the whole treatment might be called embarrassed 'Bonnie and Clyde'."

Charles Champlin of the Los Angeles Times stated, "It is such a close if mocking tribute to a celebrated movie of a couple of years ago that it could be subtitled 'Mommie and Clyde.' It is a sleek, vile exercise ... Indeed, Bloody Mama is a piece of pop art from which you emerge feeling depressed, degraded and diminished."

Kenneth Turan of The Washington Post wrote, "Its lyrical pastel shades—even the blood blends deftly into the color scheme—show that infinite pains have been taken with the film's visual aspect, a Corman trademark. Unfortunately, another Corman trademark—atrocious acting—is well-represented here, making it hard to recommend the film to people who can hear as well as see."

The film was AIP's highest-grossing film of the year.

The film is recognized by American Film Institute in these lists:

- 2008: AFI's 10 Top 10:
  - Nominated Gangster Film

== Censorship ==
The film was initially banned in France and New Zealand, although the bans were subsequently lifted. The film was initially refused certification by the BBFC in the United Kingdom but despite this, was screened at the National Film Theatre. Screenwriter Robert Thom's novelization of the film was also banned by New Zealand's Indecent Publications Tribunal in 1971, but 40 years later (in 2012) the ban was overturned by the Tribunal's successor, the Office of Film and Literature Classification.

== See also ==
- List of American films of 1970
- Ma Barker's Killer Brood (1960), an earlier highly-fictionalized account of the Barker-Karpis gang
- Big Bad Mama (1974), a later film produced by Roger Corman about a mother-turned-gangster
- Big Bad Mama II (1987), often considered a sequel to the previous film, also produced by Corman
- Crazy Mama (1974), produced by Julie Corman

== Sources ==
- Corman, Roger; Jerome, Jim (1990). How I Made a Hundred Movies in Hollywood and Never Lost a Dime. New York: Random House. ISBN 978-0-394-56974-1.
