= Public Enemies (1996 film) =

- VHS cover art
- Directed by: Mark L. Lester
- Written by: C. Courtney Joyner
- Produced by: Mark L. Lester; Dana Dubovsky
- Starring: Theresa Russell; Eric Roberts; Alyssa Milano
- Cinematography: Misha Suslov
- Music by: Christopher Franke
- Distributed by: Trimark Pictures
- Release date: November 1996
- Running time: 95 minutes
- Language: English

Public Enemies is a 1996 film directed by Mark L. Lester. The movie, which centers on the 1930s figure Ma Barker and her criminal sons, was filmed in Guthrie, Oklahoma. The film was released on direct-to-video in the United States in November 1996.

== Plot ==
Sexually abused by her brothers, Kate Barker runs away to become involved in bootlegging. She marries decent George Barker and gives birth to four sons, Herman, Arthur ("Doc"), Lloyd and Freddie. However, when George's law-abiding ways fail to provide for the family, "Ma" encourages her sons to commit crimes. Soon they become notorious criminals. FBI leader, J Edgar Hoover puts agent Melvin Purvis on the case. Meanwhile Alvin Karpis joins the gang. An attempted robbery leaves one Barker son, Herman, dead, and another Freddie, captured. Arthur Dunlop, a corrupt prison guard, helps Freddie escape and becomes Ma's lover. Dunlop plans a kidnapping that will net them $100,000, but it nearly goes wrong because of his incompetence. The gang kill him. They also kill another incompetent associate, a mob-doctor who messes up an attempt at plastic surgery. By this time Purvis is onto them. Lloyd and Arthur are arrested in Chicago, and Ma and Freddie are killed in a shootout in Florida.

== Cast ==
- Theresa Russell as Ma Barker
- Eric Roberts as Arthur Dunlop
- Alyssa Milano as Amaryllis
- James Marsden as Doc Barker
- Richard Eden – George Barker
- Joe Dain as Lloyd Barker
- Gavin Harrison as Freddie Barker
- Joseph Lindsey as Herman Barker
- Brian Peck as J. Edgar Hoover
- Dan Cortese as Melvin Purvis
- Grant Cramer as Samuel P. Cowley
- Frank Stallone as Alvin Karpis
- Rex Linn as Al Spencer
- Leah Best as Young Ma Barker
