= Tom Brown (police officer) =

Corrupt American police chief (1889–1959)

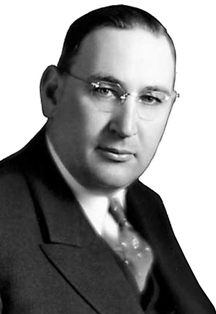
- Brown c. 1935
- Born: Thomas Archibald Brown; February 7, 1889; West Virginia, U.S.
- Died: January 5, 1959 (aged 69); Ely, Minnesota, U.S.
- Occupations: Police Officer; Police Chief
- Known for: Police corruption, kidnapping, extortion, murder

Thomas Archibald Brown (February 7, 1889 – January 5, 1959), also known as Big Tom, was an American law enforcement official who served as chief of the Saint Paul Police Department (SPPD) during the Great Depression and became notorious for flagrant police corruption.

Brown's predecessor, John O'Connor, had developed the so-called "O'Connor system" in which fugitives from other jurisdictions were immune to arrest and extradition in Saint Paul, Minnesota, so long as they kept a low profile and committed no violent crimes within the SPPD's jurisdiction. Upon taking over the department in June 1930, Brown refused to obey or enforce the traditional ban on unnecessary violence, and allied himself with the Dillinger and Barker-Karpis Gangs. The violent crimes resulting from this alliance inadvertently aided in the rise of the Federal Bureau of Investigation and its director, J. Edgar Hoover.

Through the FBI's influence, Brown's many felonies were publicly exposed during a Civil Service Board hearing, leading to his dismissal from the SPPD. He was never indicted or prosecuted, however, and died a free man in Ely, Minnesota, in 1959.

== Early career ==
Thomas Archibald Brown was born in a coal mining region of West Virginia, into a Baptist family of mixed German- and Scotch Irish descent. At 6 ft 5 in (1.96 m) Brown was too tall to work in the mines, so he worked as conductor for the Great Northern Railroad before settling in Saint Paul, Minnesota, in 1910. He worked at various jobs before joining the Saint Paul Police Department (SPPD) as a traffic patrolman in 1914.

Brown quickly learned how to use his authority as a police officer to engage in corrupt activities, committing extortion and many other crimes. Although he was careful to never to accept a bribe in front of eyewitnesses, in conversations with his brother-in-law, George Rafferty, he boasted that seeking bribes for a Saint Paul cop was easy: "Go into taverns with your hand out." In 1919, Thomas A. Brown was promoted to Detective.

As a detective, Brown achieved local fame after killing Edwin Rust, an escaped murderer, in a gunfight. He was appointed to the SPPD's "Purity Squad", assigned to identify and close down illegal casinos, speakeasies, and brothels. He quickly learned to build contacts with the criminals who ran these establishments and extorted protection money from them in return for advance warnings of raids. In 1926, during the height of Prohibition, Brown was arrested for stealing a large quantity of alcohol that had been confiscated in a raid. The same year he was suspended for thirty days after a federal judge ordered him extradited to Ohio to face charges of conspiracy and liquor smuggling. He was subsequently reinstated.

The Purity Squad became notorious for its repeated failure to find any illegal activity during raids, and a board of inquiry investigating the matter was prepared to dismiss Brown. The dismissal was withdrawn.

== Chief of Police ==
In June 1930, Leon Gleckman engineered Brown's appointment as chief of the SPPD. To the public, Brown depicted himself as a racket-buster and a fearless crimefighter, declaring war on Chicago organized crime figures who were allegedly investing in Minnesota's bootlegging and slot machine rackets. In reality, however, notorious criminals, including Dillinger Gang associate Homer Van Meter, had donated large sums to Brown's campaign in exchange for being allotted certain rackets in Saint Paul. Under Brown, Gleckman was granted a monopoly on all illegal gambling in the city.

When Gleckman was kidnapped by rival racketeer Jack Peifer, Brown worked hard for his release. The ransom was paid, but one of the kidnappers was later found shot dead by an unknown assailant. Brown took the ransom from the man's safe; he later claimed that he stored it at police headquarters, but it was never located.

Brown's tenure as chief came to an end when he became involved with the Barker-Karpis Gang, who had come to Saint Paul at Peifer's invitation. The gang committed a series of robberies in the city until a neighbor recognized them from pictures in True Detective magazine. Brown delayed responding to the information, and he or one of his associates tipped off the gang. Believing that Ma Barker's lover Arthur Dunlop had informed on them, the gang shot Dunlop and dumped his naked body before fleeing. The Dunlop murder sealed Brown's fate as chief, as the publicity led to questions about how the gang had gotten away. He was demoted by the new mayor, who was elected on an anti-corruption ticket, from Chief of Police to head of the SPPD's Anti-Kidnapping Squad.

== Head of the Anti-Kidnapping Squad ==
After his demotion, Brown ran for election as sheriff of Ramsey County. According to FBI informants, members of the Dillinger's Gang, particularly Van Meter, donated $1,500 into Brown's ultimately unsuccessful campaign. Meanwhile, with the end of Prohibition, Brown, acting through Peifer and Harry Sawyer, suggested that the Barker-Karpis Gang should move onto other crimes.

=== The Hamm kidnapping ===
They kidnapped wealthy businessman William Hamm. Brown informed them of plans by police to trap them. The ransom money was successfully collected, and a cut given to Brown.

With the assistance of mobbed up Captain "Tubbo" Gilbert of the Chicago Police Department, the Chicago Outfit succeeded in tricking the FBI into believing that the Outfit's mortal enemy, Irish mob boss Roger Touhy, had masterminded the Hamm kidnapping and many other crimes just like it in States all over the Midwest. Despite the Bureau's best efforts, however, a Federal jury in St. Paul acquitted Touhy and his enforcers of all charges.

=== Armed robbery and murder in South St. Paul ===
According to Paul Maccabee, "No crime illustrated how far the O'Connor System had eroded" than the Barker Gang's next robbery, which was carried out at the South St. Paul post office on August 30, 1933 by Charles Fitzgerald, Alvin Karpis, Fred Barker, and Chicago Outfit gangsters Byron Bolton and Fred Goetz.

After the Great Western Railroad delivered a $33,000 Swift and Company payroll from the Federal Reserve Bank of Minneapolis to the local post office, South St. Paul Police Officer John Yeaman and rookie Patrolman Leo Pavlak were assigned as escorts. At 9:45 AM, as both officers walked down the post office steps, the Barker-Karpis Gang drove up in a black sedan. Doc Barker stepped out, wielding a saw-off shotgun, and shouted, "Stick 'em up!" After Officer Pavlak surrendered his sidearm and obeyed, Doc Barker screamed, "You dirty rat, son of a bitch", and shot Pavlak in the head. Meanwhile, Fred Barker opened fire on Officer Yeaman, who survived until 1971, but was left permanently maimed. The Barker Gang then seized the payroll, but, went on a shooting spree before fleeing the scene of the robbery. According to a report by the Minnesota Bureau of Criminal Apprehension, "The bandits put on a Jesse James exhibition by shooting up and down Concord St., shooting about a dozen shots into the Postal Building and across the street. These bandits used a Thompson submachine gun and a sawed-off shotgun with which they did their shooting, and it is a miracle that no one else was shot and wounded. They appeared to be cool and reckless, not giving a damn who they shot."

In an interview with Paul Maccabee, Robert Pavlak recalled about the day of his father's death, "I ran home... That's all I remember. My mother was dying of cancer at the time -- we had so much grief then." While talking to the FBI, disgraced former St Paul Inspector of Detectives James Crumley alleged, "Truman Alcorn, former Chief of Police of South St. Paul, is very close to Tom Brown and... there is no question but Brown and Alcorn were in on the payroll robbery in South St. Paul." When asked by Maccabee about the possible complicity of fellow cops in his father's murder, Robert Pavlak responded, "There was so much criminality then, both within and without the Department, that Lieutenant Jeff Dittrich used to tell me, 'You never went to take the garbage out at night without having a gun in your hand.'"

=== The Bremer kidnapping ===
Another kidnapping by the Barker-Karpis Gang soon followed. Edward Bremer, a mobbed up Twin Cities banker and brewery heir, was abducted on his way to work after dropping his daughter at school on January 15, 1934. The FBI became actively involved. When it became evident that leaks were coming from the St. Paul Police's Kidnap Squad, Brown was isolated from the investigation.

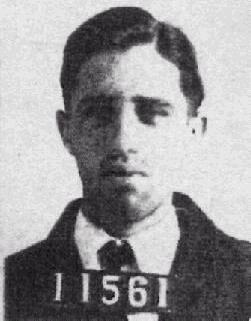
Homer Van Meter was repeatedly shot by Brown as he lay on the ground

On August 23, 1934 Brown was involved in the killing of former ally Homer Van Meter at the corner of Marion Street and University Avenue in St. Paul. Van Meter was lured to a supposed meeting, but was confronted by four police officers who were waiting for him, led by Chief of Police Frank Cullen. All were heavily armed with rifles and Brown carried a Thompson submachine gun. The officers later claimed Van Meter ignored their command to stop and fled into a nearby alley, where he fired twice on the officers with a .45 caliber pistol. Chief Cullen, armed with a rifle, held his fire as a bystander walked past, but the remaining officers opened fire on Van Meter, who fell dead. He was 27 years old. Brown continued to fire at Van Meter as he lay prone; the impact of the bullets ripped off one finger and nearly severed a thumb and finger of the right hand. The body was found to be armed with a .45-caliber Colt automatic pistol. The number and severity of Van Meter's wounds were attributed to the use of the Thompson submachine gun. Van Meter's family later said that their kin had been used for "target practice".

Out of disgust over Detective Brown's betrayal of Homer Van Meter, the Barker-Karpis Gang decided to divide what would otherwise have been the Detective's share of the Bremer ransom among themselves.

By this time, Detective Brown was also under investigation by the FBI. Many of the kidnappers had been arrested and detained by the beginning of 1935. A great deal of information about Brown's involvement given by minor gang members Edna Murray and Byron Bolton.

== Public disgrace ==
In August 1936, a two month long public hearing began before the St. Paul Civil Service Board. In witness testimony, Brown was repeatedly implicated in a criminal conspiracy with crime bosses Harry Sawyer and Jack Peifer, as well as the Barker-Karpis Gang, to commit both the Hamm and Bremer kidnappings. Claiming that all of the testimony against him was hearsay, Brown fought his dismissal, but mounting evidence of his corruption shocked the people of St. Paul enough to justify it. On October 8, 1936, the Civil Service Board announced, witness "statements have been fully investigated and as a result of said investigation, you are hereby discharged for inefficiency, breach of duty, misfeasance, and malfeasance."

Due to the influence of equally mobbed up County Attorney Michael Kinkead, however, a Ramsey County grand jury heard the evidence against the disgraced police chief, but declined to return an indictment.

== Personal life ==
He married Mary Rafferty, and the couple had four daughters and one son. The Brown family lived in a two story white stucco house 759 East Maryland Avenue in St. Paul.

In keeping with the teachings of the Roman Catholic Church on disparity of cult marriages, Mary Brown raised their children as Catholics, while her husband remained a Baptist, albeit a non-practicing one. Despite their familial relationship, one of the FBI's many confidential informants relating to Brown's criminal activities was the police chief's brother in law, a cab driver named George Rafferty.

In an interview with Paul Maccabee, Brown's daughter, Vera Peters, recalled her father as a strict disciplinarian, "of the old German feeling that kids should be seen and not heard." Peters also recalled, "We knew what was right and wrong in my family. When my brother Jim was engaged to be married, he still had to be home by eleven!"

== Later life ==
After an IRS investigation into Brown for tax evasion fizzled out for unknown reasons, the disgraced former police chief was granted a liquor license in 1937. He then ran a liquor store in Morris, Minnesota until 1946, when a municipal voting campaign forced him to close down his business.

Brown then moved away to Ely, Minnesota and opened another liquor store. In January 1947, he was indicted by a Federal grand jury for nine counts of violating Federal liquor laws. In a plea bargain negotiated by lawyer, Brown pled guilty to one count of evading Federal liquor tax and failure to register as an alcohol dealer. In return, all the other eight charges were dropped. Brown paid a $3,500 fine and received a suspended sentence of one year imprisonment. Brown's attorney alleged that his client was "a sick man", who was, "out of the liquor business and intended to stay out."

After paying his fine, however, Brown returned to Ely, where he opened a brand new liquor store named, "Tom Brown's Bottle Shop". Brown died of a sudden heart attack while crossing an Ely street in January 1959. He was 69 years old.

== See also ==
- Antoinette Frank, former Patrolwoman in the New Orleans Police Department, currently on Louisiana's death row for an armed robbery that resulted in three murders, including that of fellow NOPD officer Ronald Williams II.

== Sources ==
- Paul Maccabee (1993), John Dillinger Slept Here: A Crook's Tour of Crime and Corruption in St. Paul, 1920-1936, Minnesota Historical Society Press.
- Tim Mahoney (2013), Secret Partners: Big Tom Brown and the Barker Gang, Minnesota Historical Society Press.
