= Arthur Barker =

American criminal (1899–1939)

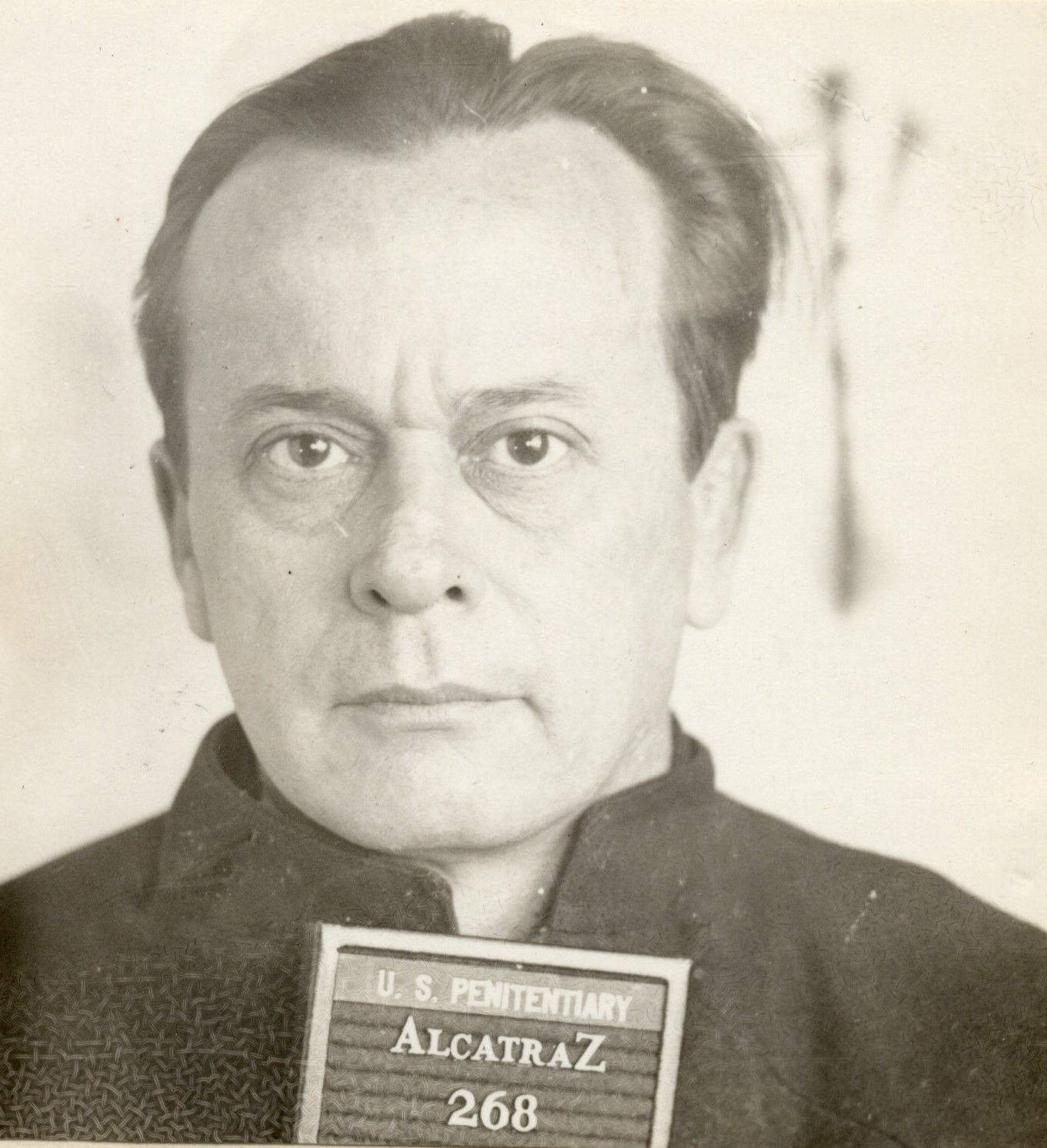
- Barker's mugshot taken at Alcatraz in 1935
- Born: Arthur Raymond Barker; June 4, 1899; Aurora, Missouri, U.S.
- Died: January 13, 1939 (aged 39); Alcatraz Federal Penitentiary, San Francisco, California, U.S.
- Cause of death: Gunshot wounds during a jailbreak attempt
- Resting place: Olivet Memorial Park
- Other names: Doc; Claude Dade; Bob Barker
- Parent(s): George Elias Barker; Kate "Ma" Barker
- Status: Deceased
- Convictions: Murder; Kidnapping
- Penalty: Life imprisonment
- Accomplice: Barker–Karpis gang

Details
- Victims: Thomas Sherill (murder); Leo Pavlak (murder)
- Date: August 25, 1921 (murder); June 1933 (William Hamm kidnapping); January 1934 (Edward Bremer kidnapping)
- Span of crimes: 1918–1935
- Country: United States
- States: Oklahoma (murder); Minnesota (kidnappings)
- Locations: Tulsa, Oklahoma (murder); Saint Paul, Minnesota (kidnappings)
- Targets: William Hamm (kidnapping); Edward Bremer (kidnapping)
- Date apprehended: January 8, 1935
- Imprisoned at: Alcatraz Federal Penitentiary

Arthur Raymond "Doc" Barker (June 4, 1899 – January 13, 1939) was an American criminal, the son of Ma Barker and a member of the Barker–Karpis Gang, founded by his brother Fred Barker and Alvin Karpis. Barker was typically called on for violent action, while Fred and Karpis planned the gang's crimes. He was arrested and convicted of kidnapping in 1935. Sent to Alcatraz Federal Penitentiary in 1936, he was killed three years later while attempting to flee.

Barker is described by one writer as "a dimwit and a drunk", who was not much more than a brutal thug. However, fellow Alcatraz inmate Henri Young said of him that he was "determined and ruthless, and that once he started on anything nothing could stop him but death."

== Early life ==
Barker was born in Aurora, Missouri, the son of George Elias Barker and Arizona "Ma" Barker (née Clark). Circa 1910, the family moved to Tulsa, Oklahoma. Through the 1920s and 1930s, Barker, with his brothers Herman, Lloyd and Fred, committed numerous crimes such as theft, robbery and murder. On July 18, 1918, Barker was arrested for stealing a car on the highway and was sent to serve prison time in Joplin, Missouri. On February 19, 1920, he escaped from Joplin prison. Using the pseudonym "Claude Dade", Barker was involved in robberies in Oklahoma. He was arrested and imprisoned at Oklahoma State Penitentiary under the name "Bob Barker" from January to June 1921.

On August 25, 1921, Barker and three other men robbed a woman at a hospital construction site in Tulsa. The three men were surprised by the night watchman, Thomas Sherill. When Sherill saw them he opened fire. Sherill was fatally shot when two of the men shot at him while fleeing the scene. After Sherill's family hired a private investigator, Barker and another man, Volney "Curley" Davis, who worked at the construction site and was friendly with the Barker family, were arrested for Sherill's murder. On January 14, 1922, Barker was convicted of Sherill's murder and sentenced to a life term at Oklahoma State Penitentiary. Barker appealed the conviction and always maintained his innocence of this crime. He was paroled ten years later, on September 10, 1932.

== Reunion with the Barker Gang ==
After his release, Barker joined up with his brother Fred and Karpis. By this time, Barker was described as a morose, heavy drinking man and a "stone eyed" killer. According to one woman associated with the Barker–Karpis gang, Barker had little interest in female company and was awkward around women, something she attributed to his institutionalized life in prison.

On December 16, 1932, Barker participated in the robbery of the Third Northwestern Bank in Minneapolis. Two policemen were killed in that robbery and a civilian was murdered by Barker's brother Fred during the getaway. On August 30, 1933, the Barker–Karpis gang robbed a payroll at Stockyards National Bank of South St. Paul. Barker fatally shot policeman Leo Pavlak after he had already surrendered.

Barker also helped the gang kidnap two wealthy St. Paul men: William Hamm in June 1933 and Edward Bremer in January 1934. Barker personally grabbed both Hamm and Bremer, intimidating them with his brutality. However, it was Barker who made a slip-up that led to the gang's capture. Having collected the ransom for Bremer, Barker was driving the captive to a drop-off point. Along the way he stopped to refuel from a gas can, and removed a glove while doing so. The discarded can was recovered and Barker's fingerprint was identified.

== Arrest ==
Unaware that police had identified them in Hamm and Bremer's kidnapping, the Barker–Karpis gang attempted to launder the money they had extorted, convinced (correctly) that the FBI had recorded the serial numbers. They briefly relocated to Cuba, then moved to Florida, where they rented a house near Lake Weir. Barker devised a plan for a new robbery, but other members of the gang rejected the idea, believing that they should keep a low profile. Bored, Barker left for Chicago.

While in Chicago, Barker met Byron Bolton, a former associate of Fred Goetz. On January 8, 1935, Barker was identified and was arrested in the street by FBI agents. When asked "Where's your gun?"; Barker replied, "Home—and ain't that a hell of a place for it?". He was interviewed by Melvin Purvis, who later wrote, "he sat in a chair, jaw clenched, looking straight ahead. He was not impressive-looking. Only his eyes told the story of an innate savagery". Bolton was also taken into custody. While Barker refused to speak, Bolton revealed that the other members of the gang were in Florida. A map found in Barker's room provided more detail. Shortly afterwards, Fred and Ma Barker were located and killed in a shootout with FBI agents.

Barker was charged with the kidnapping of Bremer. He attempted to intimidate Bremer to stop his testimony, telling him, "I have plenty of contacts out there who would get you". Nevertheless, Barker was convicted of the kidnapping and sentenced to life in prison.

== Imprisonment and death ==
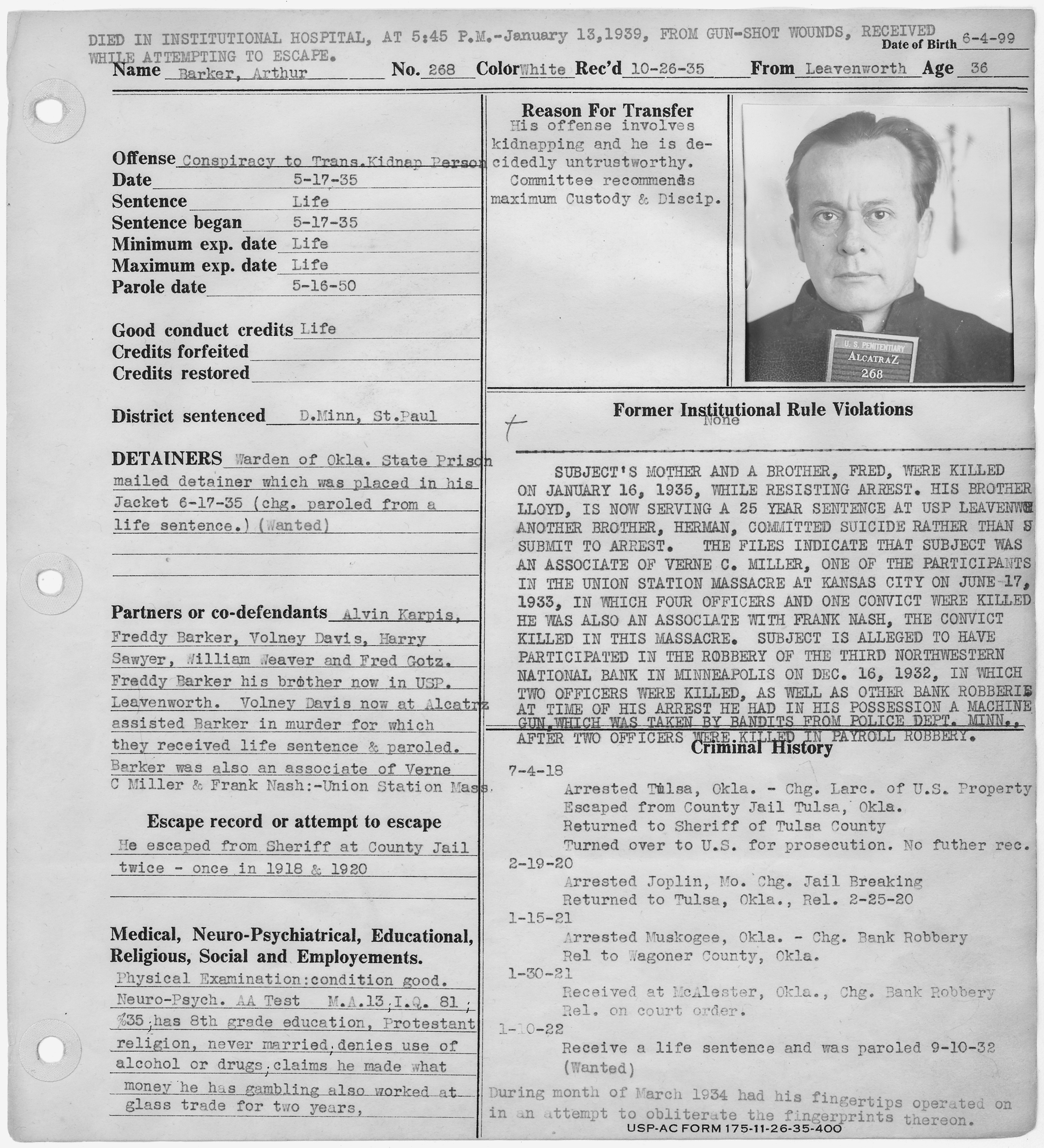
Barker's prison file with mugshot.

Along with Alvin Karpis, Arthur Barker was sent to Alcatraz Federal Penitentiary to serve his life term. On January 13, 1939, Barker and fellow inmates Dale Stamphill, Henri Young, William "Ty" Martin and Rufus McCain attempted to escape. Henri Young later said of Barker, "he was one of America's most dangerous men. I knew, however, that he was determined and ruthless, and that once he started on anything nothing could stop him but death. I couldn't think of anyone else I'd rather have with me on a break from Alcatraz."

The four men had been placed in the segregation unit for troublesome prisoners. Barker and his associates sawed through four sets of prison bars, concealing the daily damage with makeshift putty. When they finally broke through, they climbed over the high walls of the prison under cover of a foggy night and made their way to the beach. The four then split up into two pairs. Barker and Stamphill tried to swim out together towards San Francisco, but were pushed back by the tide. They then tried to quickly build a raft from bits of wood lying around the beach, tying them together with strips of cloth from their shirts. They hoped to make a serviceable raft before they were spotted, but were seen from a guard's tower when the fog briefly cleared. The guard ordered them to "throw your hands in the air", but they ignored him. Stamphill later said they didn't hear any warnings. The guard opened fire, hitting them in the legs. Another burst of fire from a patrol boat wounded Barker in the head. He told Stamphill, "Don't move. They are going to kill us". Barker was recaptured, dying shortly afterwards from his wounds. Stamphill, Young and McCain were also recaptured and sent to solitary confinement. Stamphill later claimed the associate warden gave instructions that if Doc moved at all the guards were to shoot him in the head. Doc was in considerable pain and reached for his wounded leg and was then shot. Once in the infirmary, the doctors attempted to give him a blood transfusion. He yanked the tubes out of his arm.

Arthur Barker is buried in Olivet Memorial Park, Colma, California.

== Media ==
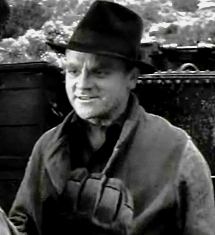
James Cagney as mother-fixated gangster Cody Jarrett, based on Barker

- The central character of Arthur "Cody" Jarrett, played by James Cagney in the classic 1949 gangster film White Heat is said to be based on Doc Barker.
- In the 1957 docudrama Guns Don't Argue, Arthur Barker is played by Lash LaRue
- Barker is portrayed by Peter Baldwin in "Ma Barker and Her Boys", an episode of 1959 TV series The Untouchables, which pits Federal Agent Eliot Ness against the Barker clan, and fictionally depicts Ness as leading the assault on Ma Barker and her sons at their Florida hide-out. In this version, Lloyd, Fred and Doc are all present at the final shootout. Arthur Barker is portrayed as Ma's "favorite son", but towards the end, he's the only son who tries to get away from his mother's malign influence to live a normal life with his girlfriend (in an ironic line, his girlfriend refers to his attempted escape from his mother with the words "he's breaking out of Alcatraz"). In this version he is the only one who survives in the end.
- Ron Foster portrayed Barker in Ma Barker's Killer Brood (1960). He has a fictional affair with Lou, the lover of Machine Gun Kelly.
- In Bloody Mama (1970) he is portrayed by Clint Kimbrough. In this version he is killed in the same gunfight in which his mother and brother Fred died.
- In Public Enemies (1996) he is portrayed by James Marsden.
- Barker's escape attempt from Alcatraz is depicted in the 1995 film Murder in the First, starring Kevin Bacon as co-escapee Henri Young. Barker is played by Michael Melvin.
- Jonas Daniel Alexander was cast as Barker in a Dollar Baby short film adaptation of Stephen King's “The Death of Jack Hamilton” in 2012. The film was not released.

== See also ==
- Bob Pavlak (1924–1994), American police officer and politician
