= Joseph P. Moran =

American surgeon

- Born: 1895; Illinois
- Died: c. July 1934 (aged 38 or 39); Toledo, Ohio
- Cause of death: Gunshot wound
- Occupation: Criminal physician
- Conviction: Illegal abortion

Joseph P. Moran (1895–1934) was an American physician known for catering to the Depression-era criminal underworld in the early 20th century. He was also a peripheral member of the Barker–Karpis gang, and was possibly the last physician to see the mortally wounded John Hamilton, a member of the John Dillinger gang, whom Moran refused to treat.

Moran disappeared in July 1934. He is believed to have been murdered by Fred Barker and Alvin Karpis.

== Early career ==
During World War I, Moran served as a pilot in the Army Signal Corps with the rank of lieutenant. Moran graduated from Tufts Medical School, Boston. An Illinois native, he briefly operated a successful private practice in LaSalle until his addiction to alcohol drove most of his business away. To maintain his income, Moran became what was then colloquially known as a "pin artist"; someone who performed illegal abortions. According to his accomplice, nurse Mae Bowers, he performed about 75 abortions, most at her home, over a three-year period.

In 1928, an anonymous letter tipped off the coroner that 19-year-old Tillie Hartel had not died from acute bronchitis, as Moran had stated on her death certificate, but had actually died from an abortion. Tillie's body was exhumed for autopsy three weeks after her death and the abortion was confirmed. Moran and Bowers were each charged with first-degree murder in Tillie's death. Each signed a confession as part of a plea deal to have the murder charges dropped. Moran received a ten-year jail term, and lost his medical license. While in prison he ran the prison hospital successfully. The warden, Henry C. Hill, was so impressed that he helped him to obtain parole in 1931 and secured the return of his medical license.

After his release, he moved to Bureau, Illinois. He was suspected of further abortions and was returned to prison, serving another 11 months for violating his parole.

== Chicago underworld ==
Apparently embittered by what he considered to be an unfair re-internment, Moran cultivated links with gangsters, facilitated by his friendship with jewel thief Oliver Berg, whom he had treated in LaSalle jail. Berg helped him make contacts in the Chicago underworld, and he was appointed the official physician of the Chicago Teamsters, Chauffeurs, Warehousemen and Helpers Union. Unofficially, he became the emergency care physician for much of the Chicago underworld, despite being fairly debilitated by alcoholism. He set up his business on Irving Park Boulevard.

Mostly he stitched cuts and removed bullets from wounded gangsters such as Dillinger-gang member John "Red" Hamilton, from whom he removed five bullets after one robbery. However, in 1934, Moran began touting his skills as a plastic surgeon, able to change the faces and fingerprints of notorious outlaws in order to hinder police identification.

== The Barker Gang ==
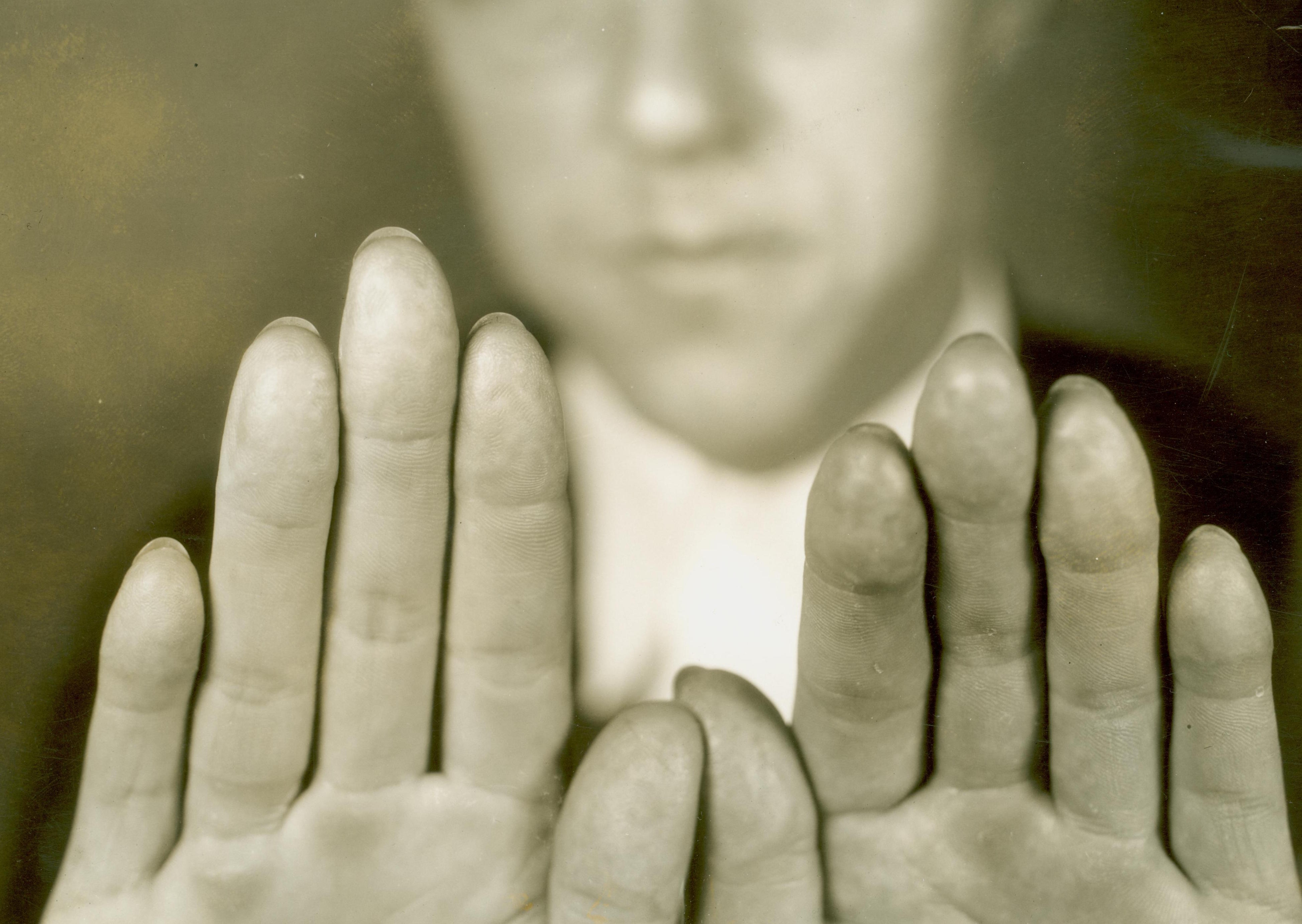
After his arrest in 1934, Alvin Karpis displays results of fingerprint removal by Moran

It was in this capacity that he became associated with the Barker-Karpis Gang. In March 1933, Moran performed plastic surgery on gang members Fred Barker and Alvin Karpis for a fee of $1,250 (equivalent to $31,000 in 2025). He was successful in removing Karpis' fingerprints (so much so that even decades later, Karpis had difficulty obtaining a passport to re-enter his native Canada), but his work on the two men's faces was judged a dismal and painful failure.

When the Barker-Karpis Gang kidnapped and ransomed Minnesota banker Edward Bremer for $200,000 (equivalent to $4,813,000 in 2025), Moran helped launder the money through his practice in Chicago. Six months later, while drinking with the gang in a club just outside Toledo, Ohio, Moran drunkenly bragged about the power he now held over the gang, knowing the incriminating details about their crime, saying, "I have you guys in the palm of my hand." It is this assertion that is believed to have sealed his fate.

== Death ==
Moran was not seen alive after the drunken bragging incident in July 1934. On September 26, 1935, a badly decomposed body washed up on the shores of Crystal Beach, Ontario, without its hands and feet. The FBI subsequently identified the body as Moran's by means of dental records.

In 1971, Alvin Karpis wrote in his autobiography that the identification was mistaken; he claimed that Moran had been murdered by Arthur and Fred Barker and then buried in a lime pit in Michigan. The most accepted version of the tale is that Karpis, along with Fred Barker, took Moran on a boat ride on Lake Erie, during which they both murdered him.
