= Lake Weir =

Lake in Marion County, Florida, United States

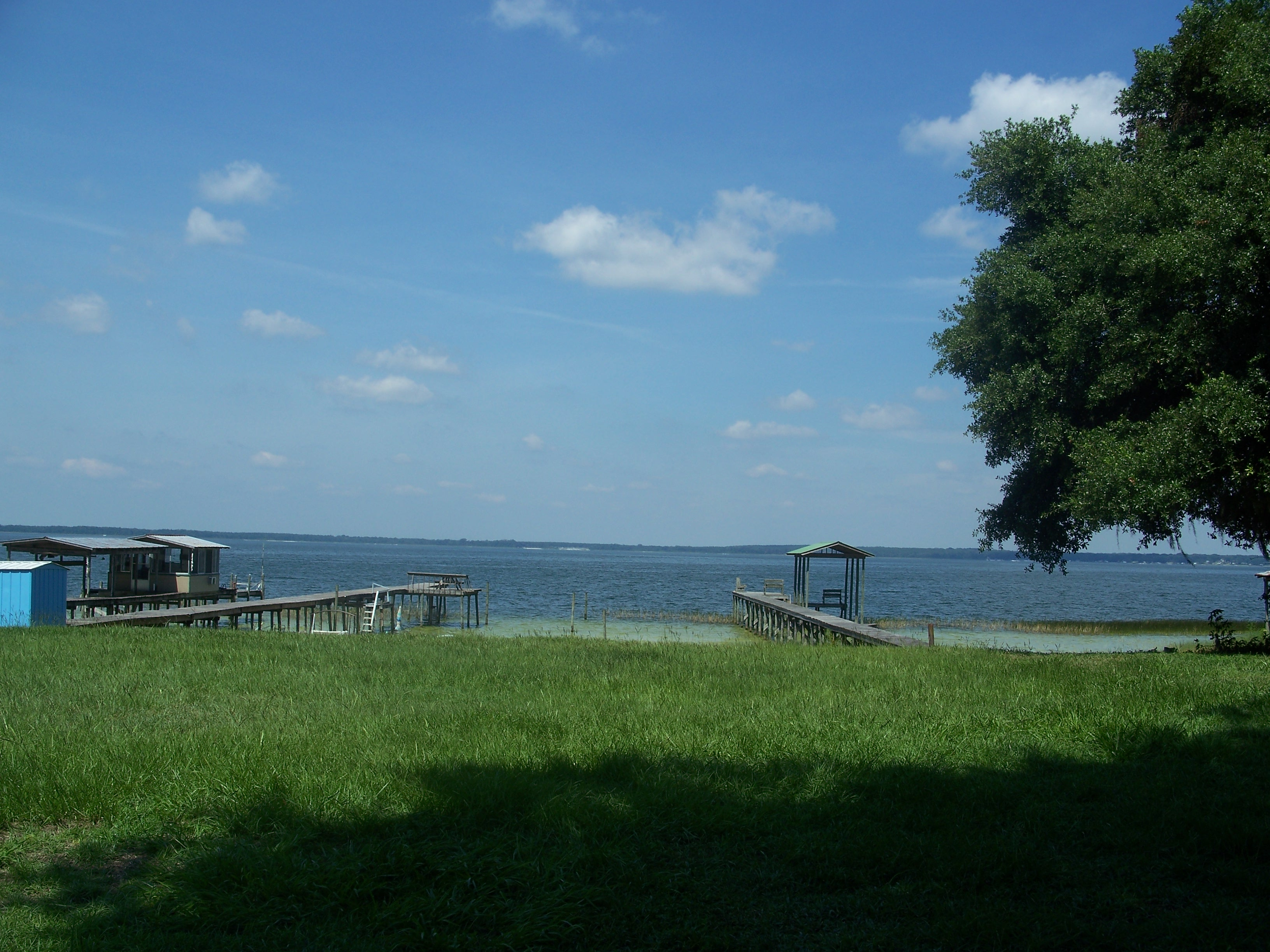
- View from Eastlake Weir

- Location within Florida Location within the United States
- Location: Marion County, Florida
- Coordinates: 29°01′N 81°56′W
- Basin countries: United States
- Surface area: 5,685 acres (23.01 km^{2}) (9 mi^{2})
- Average depth: 10–20 ft (3.0–6.1 m)
- Max. depth: 34 ft (10 m)
- Shore length^{1}: 38 mi (61 km)
- Surface elevation: 52 ft (16 m)
- ^{1} Shore length is not a well-defined measure.

Lake Weir is a fresh-water lake located in southern Marion County, Florida. Due to its large size and proximity, it is sometimes included with the Harris chain of lakes to the southeast, but is not directly hydrologically connected to them. It is connected to the west via a vegetation-filled canal to Little Lake Weir.

The lake was named for Nathaniel A. Ware, a state land official of the frontier period, but a misspelling of his name was recorded. It supports much wildlife including fish, birds, and alligators. In the 16th and 17th centuries, it was part of the territory of the town and province of the Acuera, a Timucuan-speaking indigenous tribe.

== See also ==
- Ma Barker
