= Kidnapping of Edward Bremer =

American kidnapping case

Edward Bremer, Jr.
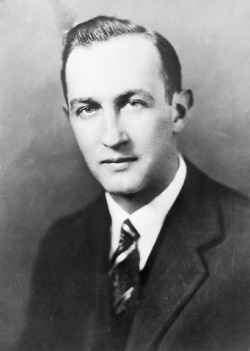
- Known for: being a kidnap victim

The 1934 kidnapping of Edward Bremer was the last major criminal enterprise of the Barker-Karpis gang. Though successful in netting the gang a large ransom, it brought down the full force of the FBI on the gang, resulting in the death or capture of its main members in the months afterwards. The kidnapping was ordered by St. Paul Jewish-American organized crime boss Harry Sawyer, and carried out by Fred Barker, Alvin Karpis, Arthur Barker, Volney Davis and Chicago Outfit mobster George Ziegler.

The successful capture and prosecution of the kidnappers greatly enhanced the reputation of the FBI. The strong evidence that the city's police were working with the criminals helped fuel campaigns against police corruption.

== Background ==
The Barker-Karpis gang operated in St. Paul, Minnesota under the protection of mobbed up police chief Tom Brown and local organized crime figures Jack Peifer and Harry Sawyer. Sawyer had orchestrated their previous successful kidnapping of William Hamm. He now proposed that Edward Bremer should be their next target. Bremer was 34, and was president of Commercial State Bank. His father, Adolph Bremer, was also a banker and the owner of the Schmidt beer brewery.

It is thought that Bremer was not chosen simply because of his wealth, but also because of a personal vendetta, possibly linked to the ending of the prohibition era. Schmidt breweries were widely believed to have survived in the prohibition era by working with bootleggers such as Sawyer. With prohibition over, the Bremers severed ties with their criminal associates. According to Sawyer's wife, her husband and Ed Bremer "got into a dispute over alcohol." Alvin Karpis later said that Sawyer had some sort of "beef" with the victim and that he "sure didn't like Bremer". When the FBI investigated the kidnapping, they discovered that Bremer had many enemies. An FBI report noted that he "is very much disliked, not only by his family, but generally. He has an uncontrollable temper, is very selfish, and has few friends".

== Kidnapping ==
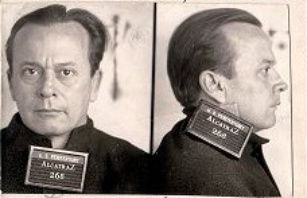
Arthur "Doc" Barker

On January 17, 1934 Bremer was kidnapped from the streets of St. Paul, Minnesota. He was on his way to work, having just dropped his daughter off at school when he was approached by two men, one of whom was Arthur "Doc" Barker. Barker repeatedly punched and pistol-whipped him, forcing him into the back of Bremer’s car and placing blindfolding goggles over his eyes. After having some difficulty starting the vehicle, the kidnappers forced the bleeding Bremer to show them the starter button, then drove off, later switching to another car. The blood-stained vehicle was later recovered, leading to fears that Bremer had been killed.

Bremer was held captive in Bensenville, Illinois. He was kept in a small room and was told that his family would be killed if he said anything to the police. He was also told to provide the names of people who could act as intermediaries. Messages demanding $200,000 (equivalent to $4,813,000 in 2025) were left with the Bremers' trusted business associate and former chauffeur Walter Magee. Through Tom Brown, the gang learned that Magee had informed the police, despite the gang's demand that he should keep quiet. They threatened to kill him and Bremer. Adolph Bremer, the victim's father, refused to pay up unless the kidnappers provided proof of life. Edward was forced to write another note pleading to be returned to his wife and children. When Adolph also tried to reduce the ransom money, Fred Barker became enraged and suggested they should kill Edward. His brother Arthur and Karpis overruled him. In the end the ransom was paid by dropping off a bag full of cash, which was collected by George Ziegler. Edward was driven to a deserted road by Ziegler and released on February 7, left on the empty road with a small amount of cash. He had to make his own way back home.

== Arrests and deaths ==
The FBI had recorded the serial numbers of all the cash used to pay the ransom. They launched an intensive investigation, declaring Alvin Karpis, presumed leader of the gang, to be "Public Enemy No. 1". Bremer, completely traumatized and worried about the safety of his wife and children, refused to cooperate with the FBI. When they threatened to reveal what they believed about his links to organized crime, he admitted what he knew about the kidnappers, and his suspicions about their connection to Sawyer.

The gang knew that they needed to launder the money, but the intensity of the FBI pressure meant that most of their criminal contacts refused to participate. Ziegler was gunned down in a drive-by killing by unknown assailants in March. Sawyer claimed that he had arranged for the money to be laundered in Cuba. The gang withdrew to Cuba, but Karpis became concerned that the money had not been laundered and that the FBI would soon find them there. They moved to Lake Weir, Florida. Doc left for Chicago, hoping to organize a new criminal project. He was soon recognized and arrested on January 8, 1935 along with minor gang member Byron Bolton. Doc wouldn't talk, but Bolton told the FBI everything he knew in exchange for a light sentence. Eight days later, Doc's brother Fred Barker and mother Kate "Ma" Barker were killed in a shootout with the FBI at Lake Weir. Volney Davis was also captured, and Sawyer was tracked down and captured in Mississippi.

Alvin Karpis, who was co-leader of the gang along with Fred Barker, was arrested by the FBI in May 1936. Karpis pleaded guilty to kidnapping and Doc Barker was convicted after a trial. Both men were sent to Alcatraz. Karpis became the Rock's longest-serving inmate, eventually being paroled in 1969 after decades in prison. Barker was shot while trying to escape from Alcatraz in 1939. Sawyer received a life sentence in 1936. He was released from prison in 1955 due to ill health and died shortly after.

== Aftermath ==
The kidnapping had a significant effect on campaigns against police corruption. During the investigation it became clear to FBI agents that information was being leaked to the kidnappers. Tom Brown was strongly suspected to be the source of the leaks and forced out of the team investigating the case. Brown was implicated as a conspirator in the kidnapping after an investigation by the FBI and a hearing before the city Civil Service Board. Brown was fired from the police force, but the federal government declined further prosecution. The death and arrests of all the important Barker–Karpis gang members greatly enhanced the reputation of the FBI.

== See also ==
- List of kidnappings (1930–1939)
