= Herbert Allen Farmer =

American criminal

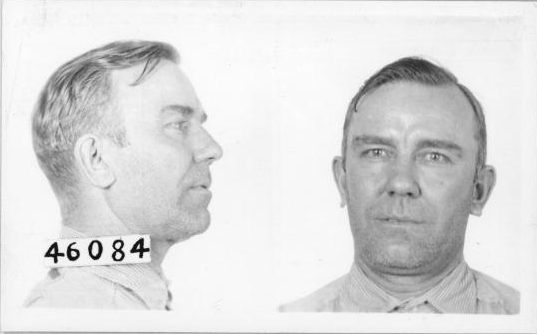
- Herbert Allen Farmer mugshot
- Born: March 9, 1891
- Died: January 12, 1948 (aged 56); Joplin, Missouri
- Other names: Herb Snyder; Herb Black; Harry J. Garner; Deafy Farmer
- Occupations: gambler, con artist
- Spouse: Esther Farmer
- Conviction: Conspiracy
- Penalty: 2 years imprisonment, $10,000 fine

Herbert Allen Farmer (March 9, 1891 – January 12, 1948), was an American criminal who, with his wife Esther, operated a safe house in southwest Missouri for underworld fugitives from the mid-1920s to 1933.

In the 1920s his farm in southwest Missouri was safe harbor for bank robbers and other criminals of the Cookson Hills region such as Harvey Bailey, Frank Nash, Wilbur Underhill, "Big Bob" Brady and the Holden-Keating Gang. In the Public Enemy era, as organized crime strengthened and expanded in the United States, the farm became part of a network of safe houses for gangsters along "the midwest crime corridor."

On June 16, 1933, Herbert and Esther Farmer were involved in the plan which set into motion the Kansas City Massacre, "a pivotal event in Depression-era crime." With five others, they were convicted of conspiracy to free a federal prisoner, Frank Nash, in January 1935.

== Life ==
A career grifter and gambler, Herbert Farmer was in and out of local jails in Texas, Missouri and Oklahoma for much of his youth. In about 1910 his family settled in Webb City, Missouri, a community near Joplin in the then-booming lead- and zinc-mining region known as the Tri-State district. As an adult Farmer made the Joplin area his home.

In Webb City, Farmer's family became acquainted with the Barker family, and for a while Ma Barker's sons "were practically raised by Herb Farmer's mother." Though the Barkers left Webb City for Tulsa, Oklahoma, around 1915, Fred Barker returned often to visit the Farmers, and he and Herb Farmer remained friends, though Farmer was perhaps 13 years older. The FBI's official summary of the Karpis-Barker gang's career stated, "It is safe to assume that Fred Barker received considerable education in the school of crime from Farmer," and later an agent noted that "Barker and Karpis are known to be henchmen (especially Barker) of Herbert A. Farmer."

In 1916 Farmer began serving a five-year sentence for assault with intent to kill in the rehabilitation-oriented Oklahoma State Reformatory, but in a few months he was transferred to the state penitentiary. During this time he schooled younger inmates in the ways of pickpocketing and con games and in the penitentiary made friends with veteran bank and train robber Jelly Nash. He served less than two years and upon his release headed west, adding to his record more arrests for assault, larceny and swindling in Colorado, California, Utah and Texas.

In about 1927 he and his wife bought a farm of 23 acres (93,000 m^{2}) roughly 7 square miles (18 km^{2}) south of Joplin, Missouri. Farmer's farm was not only a safe place to "cool off," it was "one of the best underworld postal offices in the country." The Joplin safe house operated with no recorded interference from authorities until June 1933, when the Kansas City Massacre drew federal attention.

When Fred Barker or his partner Alvin Karpis shot to death a county sheriff in West Plains, Missouri, in December 1931, Barker took Karpis, as well as his mother and her boyfriend, across the state to Herb Farmer's place. When Farmer was indicted on conspiracy charges in 1934, the gang gave him $2500 of the Hamm kidnapping ransom to help pay his legal expenses. However, during questioning in respect to that crime Farmer, unprodded, twice slyly wondered aloud if Fred Barker might have been involved in the Union Station killings.

Farmer made his official living in the hotels and gambling halls of two nearby "safe cities," the resort town of Hot Springs, Arkansas, and Kansas City, with occasional forays into Reno, Nevada and St. Paul, Minnesota, where at the time of his arrest in July 1933 he was negotiating for control of a lucrative craps concession. Though Hot Springs chief of detectives Dutch Akers knew Farmer to be "the number 1 man for the [St. Paul-Kansas City-Hot Springs] gang organization at Joplin," and though six months before his arrest for obstruction of justice in the Kansas City Massacre case he "took an old man and his wife from Hot Springs to Reno, where he cleaned them for $50,000 in the race track con," when he was arrested he was trading chickens and butter for groceries and he alone of the conspiracy defendants could not make bond.

Farmer was indeed almost completely deaf. In the 1934 conspiracy trial all of the defendants took the stand, except Farmer; he was so deaf, his wife said, that questioning him would be useless. In 1933 he was described to the FBI as "a very dangerous man, a killer, and his best known line is the con game.... his favorite weapon being the knife."

Farmer served two years in Alcatraz for his participation in the conspiracy to free Jelly Nash. After his release he returned to Missouri. He and Esther sold the farm and moved into Joplin, where they lived until his death on January 12, 1948.

In October 1966 Esther married Harvey Bailey, "dean of the American bank robbers," after a year-long courtship. She died in 1981.

== Role in the Kansas City Massacre conspiracy ==
=== Background ===
Federal agents had been on the trail of Jelly Nash for three years, since his escape from the federal penitentiary at Leavenworth, Kansas, in 1930. At noon on June 16, 1933, Nash was finishing a beer inside the White Front cigar store and pool hall on the main street of Hot Springs, Arkansas when two special agents of the Department of Justice and the police chief of McAlester, Oklahoma, grabbed him, hustled him into a waiting car and drove away. Their goal was to get Nash from Hot Springs back to Leavenworth to finish his sentence for armed robbery.

Dick Galatas, owner of the White Front and "the official representative of the gangster world in Hot Springs," went directly to the police station in City Hall to the office of Dutch Akers, chief of detectives. Dutch Akers was deeply entangled with the racketeering operations of Hot Springs and at the same time was an informant for the FBI. It was he who, that morning, had notified his FBI contact that Nash was in Hot Springs and at the White Front. Akers began calling every police station between Hot Springs and Little Rock to report that a visiting businessman named George Miller—the name Nash went by around town—had been kidnapped. He and Galatas left the police station around 1 p.m. and Galatas went to collect Jelly Nash's wife Frances.

In Benton, Arkansas, halfway to Little Rock, the agents' car was halted by a police roadblock: "three men with rifles and sawed-off shotguns." They were stopped again at the edge of Little Rock by "two police cars with riot guns." The agents and Nash were aware that the stops were delay tactics. "I hope we make it out of this state alive," Nash said, cryptically.

At 2:34 p.m., from Galatas's house in Hot Springs, Chief Akers called the Little Rock police station. The officer in charge explained that there had been no kidnapping, that a fugitive was simply being returned to prison. The officer told Akers that the car had turned west at Little Rock, onto "the Joplin road." Until then Akers and Galatas had not been certain who had taken Nash, or where they were going.

Galatas had brought Frances Nash to a neighbor's house to make phone calls. At 2:50 p.m., at Galatas's direction Mrs Nash called nightclub owner Louis "Doc" Stacci in Chicago. Stacci's subsequent phone calls to Fritz Mulloy, a friend of Verne Miller's in Kansas City, drew Miller into the plan to free Nash. Mrs Nash called Esther Farmer in Joplin.

Thirty minutes west of Little Rock the agents stopped in the town of Conway and called Ralph Colvin, the special agent in charge in Oklahoma City who had given the go-ahead to apprehend Nash, and let him know they were being tracked. Colvin told them to proceed to Fort Smith and call again from there. The agents had left the Little Rock officers "with the impression that we were proceeding to Joplin, Mo., but at a given point we left the Joplin road and dropped into Fort Smith."

Galatas and Frances Nash hired an airplane to fly Frances and her young daughter to Joplin. Mrs. Nash was afraid to fly in the Ryan B-1 monoplane. Galatas tried to calm her fears by telling her it was just like The Spirit of St. Louis, but she insisted he come with her. They arrived in late afternoon, at 6:20 p.m. Farmer met them and drove them to his farm.

At about the same time Galatas and Frances Nash arrived in Joplin, the federal agents arrived in Fort Smith and called Colvin. He told them to abandon the car and catch the 8:30 p.m. train to Kansas City. Colvin then called Reed Vetterli, the special agent in charge at Kansas City, and told him the new information. Shortly after Colvin and Vetterli spoke, "Mrs. Galatas called Galatas on the telephone and advised him that Nash was not to be brought to Joplin, but that the federal men were taking him from Fort Smith, Ark., by train "on in." By the time the agents and their handcuffed charge arrived at the station platform, their secret had already reached the press wires, and "at 8:46 p.m., 8 minutes after the train pulled out of Ft. Smith, a phone call was made from Ft. Smith to [Mrs. Nash's neighbor's house in] Hot Springs."

=== Joplin ===
Around 9 p.m. Farmer and Galatas left the farm and drove into Joplin. "Galatas and Farmer went down town for the avowed purpose of seeing if they could find out if Nash had been brought to Joplin, saying that they would do what they could to get Jelly back to his wife; but when they returned, they reported that he was not in town." Galatas called his wife in Hot Springs from Frank Vaughn's Midway Drugstore in town at 9:37 p.m. "It is apparent Galatas and others... were making plans up to that hour to have appropriate assistance at Joplin to release Nash; that was evidently the reason why [Stacci] at Chicago was trying to reach Miller and the reason [Galatas and Mrs. Nash] flew to Joplin."

"At 10:09 pm the Hot Springs number [which had received the 8:46 call from Fort Smith] called Farmer's house." At 10:17 p.m., Esther Farmer called Verne Miller's house in Kansas City and spoke to Miller's girlfriend, Vivian Mathias. "Mrs. Farmer was heard to say over the telephone on June 16th: 'They got by us here at Joplin. We watched from every angle but they got by us.'" At 12:05 a.m. June 17, Verne Miller called Herb Farmer's house from Union Station, Kansas City. Galatas told him what time the train would arrive at Union Station. Miller's phone calls earlier that evening were first to John Lazia in Kansas City, then to associates in Chicago and New York and to Harry Sawyer's Green Lantern restaurant in St. Paul to try to interest the Karpis-Barker gang, but on such short notice he could find no out-of-town takers (the Barkers were occupied at the time with the Hamm kidnapping) and the Kansas City mob did not want to get involved.

At 6 a.m. June 17, Farmer drove Galatas and the aviator from the Connor Hotel in Joplin back to the airport, and returned home. Dutch Akers later told his FBI contact that as soon as Galatas reached Hot Springs "he ordered every gangster in town to leave." At 9:51 a.m. a call was made from a pay phone in Hot Springs to the Farmers' house. When the Joplin police chief heard the news of the shootings at Union Station he immediately suspected Herb Farmer had something to do with it. He and detectives arrived at the farm at noon, but the Farmers and Mrs. Nash had fled.

=== Arrest and trial ===
Farmer went to Kansas City. He spent several days gambling in the Majestic Hotel, then returned to the farm. In hiding and out of money, he traded chickens for groceries with a family friend, bootlegger Frank Vaughn. In early July Vaughn urged him to give himself up. Farmer said he would when the weather turned cooler, that he hated to be in jail in such hot weather.

When Farmer received his phone bill on July 8 and saw the long-distance record for June 16, he sent Esther to the Joplin police station to tell Chief of Police Ed Portley that he would like to speak with him. Portley came out and arrested him at home. Esther Farmer came to visit her husband in the jail and was arrested there. Frances Nash was arrested July 11 in Illinois. Galatas eluded apprehension until September 22. The warrant for Galatas's arrest charged that he had "conspired to cause the escape of Frank Nash at Joplin, Missouri."

Farmer and his wife, Dick Galatas and his wife, Frances Nash, Vivian Mathias, Doc Stacci of Chicago and Fritz Mulloy of Kansas City were indicted by a federal grand jury in Kansas City on October 24, 1934, and charged with three counts of conspiracy to aid "the escape of [a federal] prisoner properly committed to the custody of the Attorney General." At the close of evidence counts two and three — conspiracy to harbor a federal prisoner and conspiracy to rescue a federal prisoner — were dropped. Mrs Nash testified for the government and charges against her were dismissed. The rest were convicted on the remaining count, conspiracy to free a federal prisoner, on January 4, 1935.

The flurry of phone calls on June 16 and early June 17, their times and connections, were the basis of the prosecution's case. They were also the basis of the defense's case.

The maximum penalty for conspiracy was two years and a fine of $10,000; all four men were assessed the maximum and all four were remanded to Leavenworth Federal Penitentiary. Farmer, Galatas and Mulloy were later transferred to the new federal prison in California, Alcatraz. The three women were sentenced to three years' probation and fined $5,000 each.

== Bibliography ==
- Barrow, Blanche Caldwell, edited by John Neal Phillips (2004). My Life with Bonnie and Clyde. Norman, London: University of Oklahoma Press. ISBN 0-8061-3625-1
- Breuer, William B. (1995). J. Edgar Hoover and His G-Men. Westport, CT: Greenwood Publishing Group. ISBN 0-275-94990-7
- Burrough, Bryan (2004). Public Enemies: America's Greatest Crime Wave and the Birth of the FBI, 1933–34. New York: Penguin Press. ISBN 1-59420-021-1
- FBI File 62-28915. Files that document the Kansas City Massacre investigation. FBI Records and Information
- King, Jeffery S. (1999). The Life and Death of Pretty Boy Floyd. Kent, OH: Kent State University Press. ISBN 0-87338-650-7
- Maccabee, Paul (1995). John Dillinger Slept Here: A Crooks' Tour of Crime and Corruption in St. Paul, 1920–1936. St. Paul, MN: Minnesota Historical Society Press.
- Newton, Michael (2002). The Encyclopedia of Robberies, Heists, and Capers. New York: Facts On File Inc. ISBN 0-8160-4488-0
- Rosner, David, and Gerald Markowitz (1994). Deadly Dust: Silicosis and the Politics of Occupational Disease in Twentieth-Century America. Princeton, NJ: Princeton University Press.
- Wallis, Michael (1992). Pretty Boy: The Life and Times of Charles Arthur Floyd. New York: St. Martin's Press.
- Wellman, Paul Iselin (1986). A Dynasty of Western Outlaws. Lincoln, NE: University of Nebraska Press. ISBN 0-8032-9709-2
