= Holden–Keating Gang =

Former American bank robbing gang

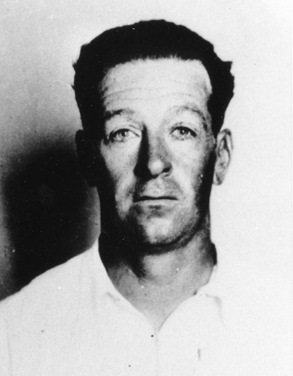
- Thomas James Holden (between 1910 and 1953)
- Founded: July 15, 1930
- Founded by: Thomas James Holden and Francis Lawrence Keating
- Founding location: Illinois
- Years active: 1926–1932
- Territory: Midwestern United States
- Membership (est.): 14
- Criminal activities: Armed robbery

The Holden–Keating Gang was a bank robbing team, led by Thomas James Holden (April 22, 1895 – December 18, 1953) and Francis Lawrence Keating (January 3, 1899 – July 25, 1978), which was active in the Midwestern United States from 1926 to 1932. Holden was described by a spokesman for the FBI as "a menace to every man, woman, and child in America" and was the first fugitive to be officially listed on the FBI's Top Ten Most Wanted List in 1950.

== History ==
=== Early years ===
Thomas Holden and Francis Keating began robbing payroll deliveries, and then train and bank robberies, before becoming one of the most notorious holdup teams by the end of the 1920s. Their most successful heist was the 1926 hijacking of a U.S. Mail truck at Evergreen Park, Illinois; they escaped with $135,000. They eluded capture for two years before they were finally arrested by federal officers. In the end, Holden and Keating were both convicted on May 25, 1928, and each sentenced to 25 years in prison.

=== Escape from Leavenworth and Midwest crime spree ===
Sent to Leavenworth Federal Penitentiary, they spent two years there before escaping on February 28, 1930. They were helped by fellow inmate George "Machine Gun" Kelly who supplied them with forged passes. Holden and Keating fled to Chicago, and from there to St. Paul, where they quickly formed a new gang who were recruited from the city's thriving underworld. This gang included Frank "Jelly" Nash, Harvey Bailey, and George Kelly. All were career criminals. The gang committed a series of major daylight robberies during 1930 and 1931, during which several minor and one-time members were killed.

The gang's first robbery occurred on July 15, 1930, when they robbed a bank in Willmar, Minnesota and stole $70,000. Harvey Bailey, George Kelly, and Vernon Miller participated in the robbery along with at least four other men. Three of these alleged gunmen, Mike Rusick, Frank "Weinie" Coleman, and Samuel "Jew Sammy" Stein, were later found shot to death at White Bear Lake. Reportedly, this occurred during a dispute with the unstable Vernon Miller.

Lawrence De Vol joined the next robbery, which netted $40,000 from a bank in Lincoln, Nebraska on September 9, 1930. Eddie Bentz joined with the gang in its next two robberies, first stealing $24,000 on September 19, 1930, and then, in their most successful heist, stealing $2.6 million in securities from a safe. The gang immediately went into hiding, but Holden and Keating resurfaced several months later and robbed $58,000 from a pair of bank messengers in Duluth, Minnesota on October 2, 1931. That same month, they joined Charlie Harmon and Frank Weber and robbed a bank in Menomonie, Wisconsin, taking away $130,000. James Kraft, a cashier and son of the bank president, was taken as a hostage during the escape and later was found shot to death outside the town. The bodies of Harmon and Weber were also found by police, both similarly shot to death and believed at the time to have been killed by their partners for the murder of Kraft. One of the suspects of the Menomonie holdup, Bob Newbourne, later confessed to the robbery and was sentenced to life imprisonment.

=== Time with the Karpis-Barker Gang ===
After the Menomonie heist, Holden and Keating joined the Alvin Karpis-Barker Gang. On June 17, 1932, they joined a gang made up of Karpis, Fred Barker, George Kelly, Harvey Bailey, Lawrence De Vol, and Verne Miller and robbed a bank in Fort Scott, Kansas for $47,000. Not only did they escape, but Frank Sawyer, Jim Clark, and Ed Davis, who were arrested and convicted of the robbery, did as well.

Less than a month later, Keating and Holden were arrested by federal agents while playing golf with Harvey Bailey in Kansas City, on July 7. The fourth robber, Bernard Phillips, slipped away during the confusion, but was later killed in New York City. It was reported that he was murdered by Frank Nash and Verne Miller, who suspected that he was an FBI informant.

=== Return to Leavenworth and final years ===
Holden and Keating were returned to Leavenworth, where they remained for nearly two decades. Holden was paroled on November 28, 1947. Two and a half years later, he killed his wife and two of her brothers during a drunken family argument in Chicago on June 6, 1949.

In March 1950, Holden was announced as the first fugitive to be listed on the FBI Ten Most Wanted List. Fifteen months later, on June 23, 1951, Holden was spotted in Beaverton, Oregon, by a local resident and acquaintance who had seen his picture in The Oregonian, a local newspaper, on June 20. Holden had been living in the area for some time under the name John McCullough. He was arrested at his job site where he worked as a plasterer. After being extradited to Chicago, he confessed the murder and was sentenced to life imprisonment. He died in prison two years later.

Keating returned to St. Paul and lived in retirement until his death from heart failure on July 25, 1978.
