= Frank Sawyer (criminal) =

Depression era outlaw

- Born: May 1, 1899; Durant, Oklahoma, United States
- Died: 1979; Odessa, Texas (Medical Center Hospital)
- Occupation: Bank robber
- Status: Pardoned from Lansing in 1969
- Conviction: Armed robbery

James Franklin "Frank" Sawyer (May 1, 1899 – 1979) was an American Depression-era bank robber and prison escapee. An associate of Jim Clark, Ed Davis and other fellow Oklahoma bandits, he was a participant in countless bank robberies throughout Kansas and Oklahoma between 1917 and 1933. He was wrongfully imprisoned for a 1932 bank robbery in Fort Scott, Kansas and spent almost 40 years in prison before he was pardoned by Governor Robert Docking in 1969.

== Early life and criminal career ==
James Sawyer was born near Durant, Oklahoma on May 1, 1899. Raised in a strict Baptist family, he was the fourth of nine children. However, he started getting into trouble as a teenager and, at age 17, started robbing banks with Jim Baldwin and Tom Slaughter. Sawyer was eventually thrown out and disowned by his parents after discovering stolen money from a then recent bank job.

He eventually found work in the gambling halls of Wichita, Kansas. It was there that he met professional bank robbers Jeff Davis, Bud Maxwell and Henry Wells with whom he would take part in a string of bank robberies during 1917 and early-1918. Sawyer was then drafted into the U.S. Army but was discharged shortly after the Armistice and returned to Wichita where he became a professional gambler. He may have been connected to Al Spencer's gang, which robbed a large number of trains and banks during the early 1920s, but there is no conclusive evidence to support this claim.

Sawyer was, however, responsible for killing two men in disputes over card games. The first was bank robber John Moore whom he shot and killed after Moore accused of him of cheating. Afterwards, Sawyer briefly returned to his hometown where he shot a local card dealer named Bleaker whom he accused of cheating. Sawyer was arrested for the shooting in Dallas six months later and extradited back to Oklahoma where was convicted of murder and sentenced to life imprisonment. Arriving at the state penitentiary in McAlester on April 13, 1920, he was in prison for two years before escaping. It is unknown whether he was a member of the team that robbed a U.S. mail train of $20,000 on August 20, 1923, one which included Al Spencer, Frank Nash and several others, but several reports claim he was in the area where police and federal agents shot and killed Al Spencer near Bartlesville, Oklahoma a month later.

== Escape from McAlester and the Fort Scott robbery ==
Sawyer was married that same year and although his wife tried to persuade him otherwise, he continued his criminal actives. He was arrested the following year shortly after his daughter was born and returned to McAlester to finish his sentence. On February 2, 1930, Sawyer was assigned to a prison work party assigned to paint the state capitol building in Oklahoma City and escaped after eluding careless guards. He remained around the capitol for another two years supporting himself by gambling and robberies. He was identified as one of the men who robbed a small bank in Union, Missouri on May 2, 1932.

It was shortly after this heist that he teamed with Jim Clark and Ed Davis for a planned robbery in Rich Hill, Missouri but called it off, supposedly due to a case of bad nerves, quietly leaving the bank before drawing their pistols. They were arrested by police several hours later, caught in the dragnet searching for the men who robbed a bank in Fort Scott, Kansas that afternoon, and were taken in for questioning. One of those who accompanied the arresting officers, 17-year-old Stanley Butner, described the arrest.

Along in the evening my father had a tip that there were three suspicious characters out northeast of town, and I wanted to go with him. He didn't want me to, but anyway he agreed to let me go. First I went in his bedroom. I knew where he kept his guns and I got me a .38 automatic revolver and stuck it in my belt. We drove out there and over a hill, sure enough, there were three of them in a black '31 model Buick. We drove our car right up to their door, and boy, you could tell things was going to pick up. We stuck them up real quick. I got out and went around on one side of the car on the back and Dad was at the front. Frank Sawyer, an Indian was in the driver's seat. We had another deputy with us. Two men had got out on our side and the Indian was getting out in front of Dad. He still had his gun in his hand and Dad said, 'I've told you the last time, drop that gun.' He finally dropped it and it hit the running board of the car. After we got back up to the jail, Dad said to the Indian, 'How come you let us capture you so easy?' He answered, 'You had a fancy gun and I've been told never try a man with a fancy gun. Besides the Indian there was Ed Davis and Jim Clark. Sawyer and Davis were escapees from Oklahoma State Prison for murder and Jim Clark had been sent up for cattle rustling out of Texas. We got a 30-30 automatic Winchester rifle. We got a sawed off pump gun, a .44 caliber double action Colt, .45 Colt automatic and a .38. Their ammunition was tied up in red bandanas on the back floor board. We got an arsenal out of there.

Although no evidence connected them to the robbery, they were all escaped convicts who were driving a stolen car. All three were indicted and wrongly convicted of the Fort Scott bank heist, in actuality committed by the Barker Gang, and sent to the state prison in Lansing. At least one account claims Sawyer was one of four outlaws recruited to rob the bank, referred to as a member of the "St. Paul Outfit", which included Harvey Bailey, Jim Clark and Ed Davis.

== Escape from Lansing ==
Sawyer and his partners escaped from Lansing less than a year later, joining a mass escape with eight other inmates on May 30, 1933. He and the others forced their way out using pistols, smuggled in by Frank Nash, and among whom included Harvey Bailey, Robert "Big Bob" Brady and Wilbur Underhill. Sawyer went off on his own after the group reached the Cookson Hills on June 4. A series of mishaps followed as Sawyer attempted to flee the area. He first attempted to hitchhike but eventually resorted to stealing a car at gunpoint. The motor of this first car died soon after and his second car blew a tire near Middleburg. He was forced to abandon yet another car when it began developing problems with the steering rod. He managed to steal a fourth car from a farm and drove it a little over six miles before it broke down just north of Gracemont. He hijacked another car but the driver purposely steered the car into a roadside ditch. Sawyer was eventually confronted near Chickasaw by Sheriff Horace Crisp and a deputy, then investigating the string of car thefts in the area, who was disarmed then knocked unconsciousness.

== Prison years and pardon ==
Returned to McAlester to serve his sentence, he was transferred to the state reformatory in 1946 and the paroled to Kansas where he was then returned to Lansing and remained there for over two decades. Sawyer was finally pardoned by Governor Robert Docking on September 18, 1969, after a signed affidavit by Alvin Karpis cleared Sawyer of the 1933 Fort Scott robbery. Sawyer filed a lawsuit against the state for wrongful imprisonment, but the case went on for several years, up until his death.
