= Ford Bradshaw =

American criminal

Ford Allen Bradshaw
- Born: January 5, 1906; Grady County, Oklahoma, United States
- Died: March 3, 1934 (aged 28); Westville, Oklahoma
- Cause of death: Killed in police shootout
- Occupation: Bank robber

Ford Allen Bradshaw (January 5, 1906 – March 3, 1934) was an American bank robber and Depression-era outlaw. He was a rival of fellow Sooner, Oklahoma, bandit Charles "Pretty Boy" Floyd, and although never as nationally well known as Floyd, Bradshaw's small town bank raids far exceeded those of Floyd during his criminal career.

Bradshaw was killed by a sheriff's deputy named William Harper while resisting arrest on March 3, 1934, at the age of 28.

== Biography ==
Terrorizing the state of Oklahoma during the late-1920s and early-1930s, Bradshaw's most successful robbery occurred on November 2, 1933, when he successfully stole $13,000 from a bank in Okmulgee, Oklahoma with Wilbur Underhill and others. Five days later, Bradshaw robbed a bank of $11,238 with Newton Clayton and Jim Benge in Henryetta, Oklahoma, on November 7, 1933; the heist would be mistakenly attributed to Floyd, George Birdwell and Aussie Elliott the next year.

A close friend of Underhill, Bradshaw drove into Vian on December 31, 1933, with several other men and began a shooting spree damaging a local restaurant, hardware store and the town jail. This was in retaliation for Underhill's shooting death the previous day when federal agents surrounded the Shawnee cottage the outlaw had rented for his honeymoon and opened fire. The attack on Vian however, caused a public outcry which finally gained the attention of state authorities. After several months on the run, Bradshaw was cornered at the rear door of an Ardmore roadhouse and killed by sheriff's deputy William Harper while resisting arrest.

== Cited works and further reading ==
- Courtney, Gary D. (2008). Carl Janaway - Smartest Bandit of the Cookson Hills. New York: House. ISBN 978-1-425-99588-1.
- Newton, Michael (2002). The Encyclopedia of Robberies, Heists, and Capers. New York: Facts On File Inc. ISBN 0-8160-4488-0.
- Yadon, Laurence (2010). 100 Oklahoma Outlaws, Gangsters & Lawmen. New Orleans: Pelican Publishing. ISBN 978-1-455-60004-5.
