= Ed Davis (criminal) =

American bank robber (1900–1938)

- Born: July 30, 1900; Waurika, Oklahoma, U.S.
- Died: December 16, 1938 (aged 38); San Quentin State Prison, California, U.S.
- Occupations: Bank robber and burglar
- Status: Executed by gas chamber
- Convictions: Oklahoma; First degree murder California; First degree murder
- Penalty: Oklahoma; Life imprisonment California; Death

Ed Davis (July 30, 1900 – December 16, 1938) was an American burglar, bank robber, and Depression-era outlaw. He was particularly active in Oklahoma, referred to by authorities as "The Fox", and frequently teamed with Jim Clark and Frank Sawyer during the early 1930s. Eventually captured in 1934, he was involved in a failed escape attempt from Folsom State Prison, resulting in the deaths of one guard and two inmates, and was executed at San Quentin.

== Biography ==
=== Early life and criminal career ===
Ed Davis was born in Waurika, Oklahoma, on July 30, 1900. He enlisted in the U.S. Army at the age of 17 but was prematurely discharged for undisclosed reasons on January 2, 1918. He spent the next year drifting then returned to his hometown where he started committing minor robberies with Oscar Steelman and Earl Berry. He was eventually arrested for one of these robberies and sentenced to two years in the Oklahoma State Reformatory. Released in the summer of 1920, he took a freight train heading east and continued riding the rails until his arrest in Hutchinson, Kansas for train riding and carrying a concealed weapon. The charges were dropped on the condition that Davis leave town which he did after purchasing a train ticket on a box car.

His next brush with the law occurred on January 23, 1923, when he and Bill Sheppard burglarized the home of oil tycoon Joe McDonald stealing $50 in cash and $2,425 in jewelry. Davis and Sheppard then hiked five miles north to their Agawam hideout however police were easily able to follow their tracks through the fresh snow and arrested them hours later. Both men pleaded guilty to robbery charges and sentenced to 10 years each at the McAlester state prison. By the time of his parole in 1928, Davis had become more violent and would frequently resist police for the rest of his criminal career. He had also developed an ear infection which left him in almost persistent pain.

=== Murder of J.R. Hill ===
One of his early confrontations with the police occurred in Marlow, Oklahoma, on April 20, 1931. He was sitting in a car with two other men, Jack Alfred and John Schrimsher, when night police chief Ike Veach and officer J.R. Hill saw them on a routine patrol and decided to approach the car. All three men were heavily armed and one of them fired a shotgun which shattered the windshield and killed Hill instantly. Sheriff Veach was also badly wounded from buckshot but returned fire managing to disable their car and wounding Alfred before they escaped. All three men were caught after a brief manhunt. Alfred was the first to be arrested and was sent to a hospital in Duncan, Oklahoma, where he awaited trial. Schrimsher surrendered to authorities near Henderson, Texas, on October 24 while Davis was found in an East Texas oil field the next day and taken into custody. At the time of his capture, he was renting a house with his wife under the name Paul Martin in Joinerville. Davis and his accomplices were tried and convicted of murder and sentenced to life imprisonment on August 3, 1931.

=== Escape from McAlester ===
After nine months in prison, Davis escaped the McAlester state penitentiary with Robert Smith and Edmond Hardin on May 26, 1932. Hardin was quickly recaptured while still on foot but Davis and Smith were able to escape by stealing a car. Davis then attempted to try his hand at bank robbery and joined veteran outlaws Jim Clark and Frank Sawyer. The gang's time was short-lived however. On June 17, the three were arrested by police near Black Rock, Arkansas. In addition to driving a stolen car, they were also charged with a bank robbery carried out hours before in Fort Scott, Kansas. The robbery was actually committed by the Barker Gang, however Davis and his partners were wrongfully convicted on the robbery and given long jail terms.

=== Time with the Bailey-Underhill Gang ===
Davis escaped from prison once again, this time taking part in a mass escape from the Kansas state prison in Lansing on May 30, 1933. He was one of twelve convicts including Harvey Bailey, Robert "Big Bob" Brady, Wilbur Underhill, Jim Clark and seven others. He briefly joined the Bailey-Underhill gang in two major robberies, first as the getaway driver in Black Rock on June 16 and in Kingfisher, Oklahoma on August 9, Davis later being identified with Clark and Bailey from prison mugshots. Bailey was arrested at a ranch by federal agents two days later, the FBI then looking for George "Machine Gun" Kelly, and was wrongfully charged as an accessory to the Charles Urchel kidnapping case.

With Bailey in jail, the Bailey-Underhill gang broke up and Davis decided to strike out alone. He began a one-man crime spree raiding countless banks in central Texas with such success that police began referring to him as "The Fox". By late-September 1933, Davis decided he had gained enough money to retire and moved with his wife to California. He was also considering surgical removal of various prison tattoos.

=== Capture, imprisonment and death ===
However, Governor Alf Landon had ordered the Kansas state police to "spare no effort" in hunting down the escapees from Lansing prison. Within two months, only Davis and Wilbur Underhill remained at large. Underhill was gunned down by Oklahoma police on December 30, 1933, while Davis was captured months later. Running out of money while living in Los Angeles, he robbed a store and then kidnapped its owner J.J. Ball. He was quickly arrested and tried on a series of charges including three counts of first-degree burglary, six counts of robbery and two counts of kidnapping. A second version claims he was captured by police in an apartment-house raid in March 1934. Davis was convicted and sentenced to life imprisonment in Folsom State Prison on June 22, 1934. Kansas authorities declared they would prosecute Davis to finish his prison sentence in Lansing if he ever received parole.

While serving his time in Folsom, he became known among the inmates as "Old Deafy". Davis eventually tried to escape after three years inside when, on September 19, 1937, he and six other convicts took the warden and two guards hostage. They held them at knifepoint and attempted to use them to leave the prison but guards opened fire instead. The warden and two prisoners were killed before Davis and the surviving convicts surrendered. All five inmates were convicted of murder, including Davis, and sentenced to death.

Davis was sent to San Quentin where he remained on death row for a week before his execution in the gas chamber on December 16, 1938. A note was found in his cell following his execution which read "No regrets for Old Ed. All considered, my conscience is now resting easy".

== See also ==
- Capital punishment in California
- List of people executed in the United States in 1938
