= Wilbur Underhill Jr. =

American criminal, burglar, bank robber and Depression-era outlaw

- Born: Wilber Underhill Jr. March 16, 1901; Joplin, Missouri, U.S.
- Died: January 6, 1934 (aged 32); Shawnee, Oklahoma, U.S.
- Cause of death: Gunshot wounds
- Other names: "Mad Dog", "Tri-State Terror", "The Southwest Executioner"
- Status: Released in 1922; Paroled in 1926; Escaped in 1931; Escaped in 1933
- Convictions: Burglary (1918); Armed robbery (1923); Rape (1927); Murder (1931)
- Penalty: 4 years imprisonment 5 years imprisonment Life imprisonment Life imprisonment

Wilbur Underhill Jr. (March 16, 1901 – January 6, 1934), often called "Mad Dog" or the "Tri-State Terror", was an American criminal, burglar, bank robber and Depression-era outlaw. He was one of the most wanted bandits in Oklahoma during the 1920s and 1930s and co-led a gang with Harvey Bailey that included many fellow Cookson Hills outlaws including Jim Clark, Ed Davis and Robert "Big Bob" Brady.

== Biography ==
=== Early life and criminal career ===
Wilbur Underhill Jr. was born Joplin, Missouri on March 16, 1901, one of seven children. His three older brothers Earl, George and Ernest all became career criminals, though none gained the notoriety of Wilbur, while his three sisters led law-abiding lives. When Underhill was 12 years old, his brother George killed a local peanut vendor and was sentenced to life imprisonment. Underhill began to show a wild streak soon afterwards though his mother claimed it was the result of a childhood accident that "didn't leave him quite right". He also changed the spelling of his given name from Wilber to Wilbur believing it sounded more manly.

Underhill committed his first criminal offense by stealing silverware from a neighbor's home. When questioned by police, he attempted to convince them that a stranger had given it to him. In 1918, he was convicted of burglary and spent four years in prison. A year after his release, Underhill became locally known as the "Lovers Lane Bandit". When his identity became known, after being caught by a police decoy, he was sent to the Missouri State Penitentiary for five years.

=== Crime spree with Ike "Skeet" Akins and the murder of George Fee ===
Underhill was released on parole in late 1926, and on Christmas Day he and Ike "Skeet" Akins robbed a drug store in Okmulgee, Oklahoma. In the course of the robbery, 19-year-old customer George Fee was killed. They were eventually arrested on January 7, 1927, and charged with murder and armed robbery. Underhill and Akins were still awaiting trial when they decided to escape from the Okmulgee jailhouse on January 30 with fellow inmates Red Gann and Duff Kennedy using smuggled hacksaws. While Underhill successfully eluded authorities, his partner was captured at Lamar, Missouri on February 9. Three days later, while being brought back to Okmulgee, Akins attempted another escape and was killed by Sheriff John Russell.

A day after Akins' death, Underhill robbed a movie theater for $52 in Picher, Oklahoma. Confronted by Constable George Fuller, he grabbed Fuller's pistol and killed a deputized civilian, Earl O'Neal, before escaping. Underhill was finally caught in Panama on March 20 and taken to Okmulgee where he was convicted of the Fee murder and sentenced to life imprisonment on June 3, 1927.

=== Escape and Frank Underhill ===
Underhill made several attempts to escape from the Oklahoma State Penitentiary and finally succeeded on July 14, 1931. Twelve days later, Underhill purchased a car in Cherryvale, Kansas under the name Ralph Carraway and robbed a local theater of $300 that same day. The following month he recruited his young nephew, Frank Underhill, to join him on a new crime spree. On August 12, they robbed a Wichita gas station but got only $14.68. While leaving the scene of the robbery, Underhill crashed into another car and had to have it towed to a nearby garage and checked into a hotel.

The next day, Patrolman Merle Colver arrived at the hotel. He had been assigned to check Wichita hotels for suspicious guests and went to their room to question them. When he knocked on the door, Wilbur Underhill shot him 3 times in the head killing him instantly Fleeing on foot, Underhill became involved in a running gunfight with police. A 2-year-old boy was killed in the crossfire when police fired at Underhill. He was eventually stopped by a lucky shot to the neck. Wilbur Underhill was convicted of murder, earning him another life sentence, and was imprisoned in Lansing state prison on September 4, 1931. Frank Underhill was not charged and, apparently "scared straight" from his experience, never committed another criminal offense for the rest of his life.

=== Bailey-Underhill Gang ===
By the early 1930s, Underhill had become one of the most notorious bandits in Oklahoma. While an inmate in Lansing, he participated in a mass escape with 10 other inmates using pistols smuggled in by Frank "Jelly" Nash and headed for Cookson Hills. Among those included in the jailbreak included fellow outlaws Harvey Bailey, Jim Clark, Frank Sawyer, Ed Davis and Robert "Big Bob" Brady on May 30, 1933. Many of these men later became members of the gang headed by himself and Bailey as they set off on a crime spree lasting a little over six months.

Almost two weeks after their escape, on June 16, he and Bailey led a robbery with several other men robbed a bank in Black Rock, Arkansas. The next day, Underhill and Bailey were among several fugitives wrongly named as participants in the Kansas City Massacre, a failed attempt to free Frank Nash from police custody, resulting in the deaths of Nash and the four lawmen guarding him. The gang continued its activities and robbed $11,000 from a bank in Clinton, Oklahoma. Two days later, Underhill apparently acted alone in a bank robbery in Canton, Kansas but rejoined the gang by the time the Bailey-Underhill Gang struck a bank in Kingfisher, Oklahoma on August 9, 1933.

=== Return to the Cookson Hills ===
Three days after the Kingfisher robbery, Bailey was visiting Robert Shannon, father-in-law of Machine Gun Kelly, at his Texas ranch and safehouse when police and federal agents raided the property. Bailey had been passed ransom money from Kelly's kidnapping of oil tycoon Charles Urschel and wrongly convicted in the plot two months later.

With Bailey serving a life sentence, Underhill took charge of the gang. On October 6, he and several unidentified men robbed $3,000 from a bank in Baxter Springs, Kansas. These were followed by bank raids in Galena, Kansas and Stuttgart, Arkansas. On November 9, he and Ford Bradshaw raided an Okmulgee bank with a few other men and escaped with $13,000.

Underhill was now attracting national media attention. He had been called "Mad Dog" or the "Tri-State Terror" by several newspapers, one even dubbing him The Southwest Executioner, while authorities made efforts to go after them almost immediately following the Okmulgee heist. A special task force was formed, and included armored cars, and searching through Cookson Hills looking for him. On November 18, while the task force was still in Cookson Hills, Underhill presented himself at the courthouse in nearby Coalgate and applied for a marriage license under his own name. His fiancée, Hazel Jarrett Hudson, was a sister of the outlaw Jarrett brothers. As part of a wedding present for Hazel, Underhill and several others robbed a bank in Frankfort, Kentucky.

=== Pursuit by the FBI ===
FBI Director J. Edgar Hoover, reportedly frustrated with the lack of progress from Oklahoma authorities, assigned agent R.H. Colvin to the Underhill case. Colvin soon discovered that Underhill had given his wife's address in Oklahoma City to the minister who married them in order to receive their marriage certificate. Federal agents staked out the home and spotted the Underhills a week later. Agents at the scene called for reinforcements but, by the time they arrived, the newlyweds had left to celebrate their honeymoon. A few days later, police raided a farm near Konawa where they knew Underhill was staying. However, Underhill had passed them earlier on the highway and was able to escape before police realized their mistake.

Underhill and his gang continued to remain active in the area. Underhill, Jack Lloyd and Ralph Roe attempted to burglarize a bank in Harrah, Oklahoma on December 11, 1933, and robbed another bank in Coalgate two days later.

=== Shawnee ambush and death ===
On December 26, 1933, Wilbur and Hazel Underhill were celebrating their honeymoon with Ralph Roe and his girlfriend Eva May Nichols at a rented cottage in Shawnee, Oklahoma. Four days later, a 24-man strike force including federal agents, state troopers and local police surrounded the house. The group was led by R.H. Colvin and Frank Smith, the latter a survivor of the Kansas City Massacre. When called on to surrender, Underhill began firing resulting in the task force returning fire.

Eva Nichols, an innocent woman, was killed in the gunfight and Underhill, barefoot and still in his underwear, ran from the house attempting to escape. He was hit five times before leaving the yard but ran for another 16 blocks before breaking into a furniture store and collapsing on one of the beds. Ralph Roe, also wounded, was taken into custody with Hazel Underhill. Underhill was taken to McAlester where he remained, handcuffed in his bed, at the prison hospital until his death on January 6, 1934. His last words were "Tell the boys I'm coming home".

Underhill's gang, led by Ford Bradshaw, led a raid into the small town of Vian and shot up the town in revenge for Underhill's capture. This accomplished little, especially with Underhill's death a week later, and the incident was used by newspapers to turn public opinion against the gang and within months Bradshaw and the others had been killed or apprehended.
