= Lawrence DeVol =

- Born: November 17, 1903; Ohio, United States
- Died: July 8, 1936 (aged 32); Enid, Oklahoma
- Cause of death: Killed in police shootout
- Other name: Lawrence Barton
- Occupation: Bank robber

Lawrence DeVol (November 17, 1903 – July 8, 1936) was an American criminal, bank robber, prison escapee and Depression-era outlaw. He was connected to several Midwestern gangs during the 1920s and 1930s, most often with the Barker-Alvin Karpis and Holden-Keating Gangs, and was also a former partner of Harvey Bailey early in his criminal career. DeVol is known to have killed at least eleven people during his criminal career, including six law enforcement officers.

== Early life ==
Lawrence DeVol was born in Belpre, Ohio in 1903 to parents Helem and Emma (Shanks) DeVol. He moved with his parents and brother Albert to Oklahoma as a child, being raised in the Tulsa area. Lawrence's mother would later marry a second time, to William Keener, but it is unclear whether it was a circumstance of divorce or being widowed.

== Criminal career ==
On May 20, 1914, Lawrence DeVol was sentenced to the Oklahoma State Training School for White Boys as an incorrigible youth. After serving a short term, he soon became involved in theft and other criminal activity and, as a member of the Tulsa "Central Park Gang", he was first arrested for larceny at age 13. DeVol participated in his first bank robbery on August 19, 1927, when he joined Eddie Fitzgerald, Harry Morris and Harvey Bailey in stealing $70,000 from a bank in Vinton, Iowa. He joined the group in a second robbery, which included Al Johnson, stealing $225,000 from a bank in Washington Court House, Ohio on February 6, 1928.

DeVol was convicted that same year in connection with a bank robbery in Kansas and sent to the state reformatory in Hutchinson. During his incarceration, he was befriended by Alvin Karpis. The pair escaped from the facility on March 9, 1929, and reached Pueblo, Colorado where they stole a car and headed south. They stopped in Woodward, Oklahoma where they attempted to burglarize a store, but DeVol was caught, arrested and returned to Hutchinson. In spite of his escape attempt, DeVol was paroled by the end of the year and rejoined his old partner in a string of robberies throughout Kansas and Oklahoma. They were eventually arrested in Kansas City, Kansas on March 23, 1930, with DeVol posting $1,000 bail on April 1 and abandoning Karpis by leaving town.

=== Cop killer ===
As a fugitive, DeVol became increasingly hardened and violent during his years on the run. In April 1930, he and Jimmie Creighton were the prime suspects in the robbery and murder of two businessmen at the Hotel Severs in Muskogee, Oklahoma. On June 25 of that year, he committed his first known murder when he shot and killed two police officers, Sheriff William Sweet and City Marshal Aaron Bailey, in Washington, Iowa. Less than three months later, he reunited with Harvey Bailey to rob $40,000 from a bank in Ottumwa, Iowa as part of a team which included Thomas Holden and Francis Keating, Vernon Miller and Frank Nash.

On the night of November 16, 1930, DeVol single-handedly robbed the Orpheum Theater in Hannibal, Missouri. Around five a.m. the next day he engaged in a shootout with two police officers in Kirksville, Missouri, killing one and wounding the second. A group of citizens had earlier that morning observed DeVol acting suspiciously around one of the towns movie theaters and alerted authorities. Officers George Scriven and John Rose approached DeVol's vehicle at a gas station and asked him to exit the car. He did so, with a gun in each hand and opened fire. Rose was killed instantly while the wounded Officer Scriven returned fire but missed as DeVol fled on foot. Investigators searching the car found a pair of shotguns plus money and checks from the earlier Hannibal robbery.

After the murder in Kirksville, DeVol disappeared for over a year before turning up in St. Paul, Minnesota around Christmas, 1931, where he joined the Barker Gang. His first known robbery with the gang was on March 29, 1932, when he joined Fred Barker, Alvin Karpis, Thomas Holden and Bernard Phillips in stealing $226,500 in cash and securities from a bank in Minneapolis. On June 17, DeVol was part of an eight-man team including Fred Barker, Alvin Karpis, Thomas Holden, Francis Keating, Harvey Bailey, Vern Miller and Frank Nash which robbed $47,000 from a bank in Fort Scott, Kansas. The next robbery earned even more when he and Fred Barker, Karpis, Jess Doyle and Earl Christman stole $250,000 in cash and bonds from a bank in Concordia, Kansas on July 25. While this was possibly the most successful heist he had been involved in, his next bank job in Wahpeton, North Dakota netted only $6,900. His accomplices were Doyle, Karpis and Fred and Arthur Barker.

He returned with the gang to Minneapolis at the end of the year, where along with seven other men, including Bill Weaver, Doyle, Verne Miller, Karpis and the Barker brothers held up a bank for $22,000 in cash and another $92,000 in bonds on December 16. The robbery turned violent as DeVol killed Patrolmen Ira Evans and Leo Gorski outside the bank. Fred Barker also killed an innocent bystander when the gang were switching getaway cars in St. Paul.

DeVol was arrested in St. Paul days after the robbery, either on December 18 or 21, 1932. He had been behaving in a drunk and disorderly manner. He was convicted of murder and sentenced to life imprisonment. He was first sent to the state prison in Stillwater, Minnesota but later transferred to the St. Peter Hospital for the Criminally Insane. He escaped from there in a mass breakout, along with fifteen other inmates on June 6, 1936.

=== Final crime and death ===
On July 8, 1936, DeVol robbed a bank with Don Reeder, a fellow escapee from St. Peter Hospital, in Turon, Kansas. He then fled to Enid, Oklahoma. The owner of the German Village Tavern, a former Enid law enforcement officer, alerted authorities that he feared a robbery was imminent, because of the behavior of a small group of strangers in the establishment. Police arrived and when asked to come with them for questioning DeVol responded "Let me finish drinking my beer", after which he emptied the mug with one hand while pulling a gun with the other and opening fire with a .38 caliber pistol. Patrolman Cal Palmer was killed instantly while fellow lawman Ralph Knarr received serious wounds. DeVol fled the tavern on foot and jumped on the running board of a passing vehicle two blocks later, telling the driver he was a Deputy Sheriff. However, two other Enid police officers arrived on the scene at the same time and another gun battle ensued. In the exchange, Officer Lelon Coyle was struck in the finger. The return fire by the two lawmen struck DeVol nine times and he died at the scene.
