= Herbert Farmer =

Herbert Farmer may refer to:

- Herbert Allen Farmer (1891–1948), American criminal who operated a safe house
- Herbert Henry Farmer (1892–1981), British Presbyterian minister, philosopher of religion, and academic

== See also ==
- Herb farm
