= Frank Keating (disambiguation) =

Frank Keating or Francis Keating could refer to:

- Frank Keating (born 1944), American attorney and former governor of Oklahoma
- Frank A. Keating (1895–1973), United States Army general
- Frank Keating (journalist) (1937–2013), English sportswriter
- Frank Keating (1899–1978), American bank robber and member of the Holden–Keating Gang
