= Adam Richetti =

Depression era outlaw

Eddie Richetti
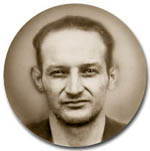
- Mugshot of Richetti
- Born: August 5, 1909; Strawn, Texas, U.S.
- Died: October 7, 1938 (aged 29); Missouri State Penitentiary, Missouri, U.S.
- Cause of death: Execution by gas chamber
- Conviction: First degree murder
- Penalty: Death

Adam "Eddie" Richetti (August 5, 1909 – October 7, 1938) was an American criminal and Depression-era bank robber. He was associated with Aussie Elliott and later Pretty Boy Floyd in the early 1930s, both he and Floyd later being implicated in the Kansas City Massacre in 1933.

== Biography ==
Adam Richetti was born in Strawn, Texas, on August 5, 1909, and moved with his family to Lehigh, Oklahoma three years later. He had an older brother Joseph and a younger sister Eva. Richetti, although he began drinking heavily at 14, was apparently uninvolved in criminal activity until his arrest for robbery in Crown Point, Indiana on August 7, 1928, two days after his 19th birthday. He was convicted and sentenced to serve 1 to 10 years at the Pendleton state reformatory, remaining there for two years, and paroled on October 2, 1930.

He participated in his first bank robbery two years later when he joined Fred Hamner and brothers L.L. and W.A. Smalley in raiding a bank in Mill Creek, Oklahoma. During the getaway, Hamner was killed and the Smalley brothers were wounded and captured at the scene. Richetti, also wounded, was able to escape with $800. He managed to make it to Sulphur, Oklahoma before being arrested, only two hours after the robbery. On April 5, he was convicted of the robbery and sent to McAlester state prison. He spent four months in prison before being granted release under a $15,000 bond pending appeal of his conviction. Richetti quickly skipped bail and disappeared for several months.

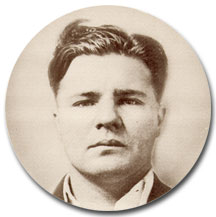
Pretty Boy Floyd

He finally reappeared on January 12, 1933, to rob a bank in Ash Grove, Missouri of $3,000. His partners in the heist were Edgar Dunbar and Aussie Elliott with whom he hid at his brother's home in Bolivar, Missouri. Sometime prior to this, Richetti met Pretty Boy Floyd who eventually became one of his closest confidants. The two became partners and, despite Richetti's worsening alcoholism, accompanied Floyd on a crime spree during the summer of 1933. They stole a car in Castle, Oklahoma on June 8 and together stole $1,638 from a bank in Mexico, Missouri six days later. That same afternoon, two police officers were killed near Columbia for which Richetti and Floyd were wrongly accused.

Three days later, on June 16, the two men kidnapped Polk County Sheriff William Killingsworth from Bolivar, driving east in his brother's car (which he stole) until reaching Clinton, Missouri, where they commandeered another car and took its driver Walter Griffith hostage as well. Both Killingsworth and Griffith were released later that night at Lee's Summit near Kansas City. Unknown to either Richetti or Floyd, while they were driving across Missouri, bank robber Frank Nash was being transported by train from Arkansas to Kansas City where his partners attempted to free him from custody. A shootout resulted, referred to as the Kansas City Massacre, which left Nash and four of his guards dead. Eyewitness accounts were inconsistent and various men were identified in the aftermath including Harvey Bailey and Wilbur Underhill. Vernon Miller, a former sheriff turned outlaw, was identified as the ringleader but his accomplices remained unknown.

Meanwhile, Richetti and Floyd struck again holding up a Galena bank for $3,000 on August 29. A month later, they rented an apartment in Buffalo, New York and moved in with their gun molls, sisters Rose Ash and Beulah Bird, on September 21.

Despite the fact that there was nothing to link Richetti and Floyd to the shooting, the FBI identified them along with Miller as the triggermen on October 10, 1934. At the time of the announcement, the two were still living in Buffalo with their girlfriends. Floyd, by this time, had been elevated to "public enemy #1" for his alleged role in the Kansas City Massacre.

The basis for Floyd's involvement was largely circumstantial. A .45-caliber cartridge shell found at the scene was later traced to one of Floyd's guns months after the shooting and questionable testimony from one of Miller's female associates, held incommunicado by the FBI and without legal representation, was enough to convict Floyd. As a well-known associate, it was assumed that Richetti had also taken part in the rescue attempt. Richetti is believed by most modern crime historians to have had no active role in the Kansas City Massacre, the most popular story being sleeping off an all-night drinking binge at the time the shooting began.

After hearing the news, Richetti and Floyd fled Buffalo with their girlfriends on October 20. Heading for Oklahoma, their car broke down near Wellsville, Ohio after two days on the road. They sent the girls into town to get a tow truck and hid in the woods until their return. Their presence attracted the attention of local residents who called the police and arrested Richetti. Floyd managed to escape but was cornered by federal agents under Melvin Purvis near East Liverpool and gunned down two days later.

Richetti was indicted for obstruction of justice on November 6, 1934, albeit that charge was held in abeyance when he was officially charged with murder by Missouri state officials for his alleged role in the Kansas City Massacre. During this time, Richetti was represented by Attorney Hugo Chestosky who fought against Richetti's extradition to Missouri. Chestosky doubted Richetti's role in the Kansas City Massacre based on his belief that the suspect had no involvement in the death of the officers. His trial began on June 13, 1935, during which time a number of eyewitnesses identified him and Floyd despite these witnesses having previously identified other suspects or had been unable to identify anyone at the time of the shooting two years earlier. Three days later, Richetti was found guilty of the murder of police officer Frank Hermanson and sentenced to death. His legal team appealed the court's decision but ultimately failed to get a new trial. Richetti was originally going to be hanged, but was instead executed in Missouri's newly constructed gas chamber on October 7, 1938.

== See also ==
- Capital punishment in Missouri
- List of people executed in the United States in 1938
