= William Miller (criminal) =

American bank robber and outlaw

Billy "The Killer" Miller
- Born: 1906; Ironton, Ohio, United States
- Died: April 16, 1931 (aged 25); Bowling Green, Ohio
- Cause of death: Killed in shootout with police
- Other name: The Killer
- Occupation: Bank robber

William "Billy the Killer" Miller (1906 – April 16, 1931) was an American bank robber and Depression-era outlaw. In his brief criminal career, he committed numerous bank heists in Michigan, Ohio, Kentucky and Oklahoma, and teamed up with George Birdwell and Pretty Boy Floyd during the early 1930s.

== Biography ==
Miller was born in Ironton, Ohio, in 1906. He first earned his nickname "Billy the Killer" when, on September 18, 1925, the 19-year-old Miller killed his brother Joseph in a fight over a woman. Tried in Beaver County, Pennsylvania, he was acquitted of murder on the grounds that he had suffered emotional trauma due to the death of his brother. He eventually fell into a life of crime and, in August 1930, he was arrested by police in Lakeside, Michigan, and charged with a series of bank robberies committed in Michigan and Ohio. On September 2, Miller escaped from custody while imprisoned in Lucas County, Ohio, and fled to Oklahoma where he eventually joined up with George Birdwell and Pretty Boy Floyd.

== Final years ==
On March 9, 1931, he joined Birdwell and Floyd in a $3,000 bank robbery in Earlsboro, Oklahoma. While Miller and Floyd headed for Kansas City shortly afterwards, Birdwell choosing to remain in Oklahoma, they began dating sisters Rose Ash and Beulah Baird. At the time, Rose was married, and Beulah was dating her brother-in-law. On March 25, Miller and Floyd murdered the brothers William and Wallace Ash, and left their bodies in a car which was found on the outskirts of town days later. Meanwhile, Rose and Beulah joined the outlaws as they continued their crime spree.

Miller and Floyd headed east, robbing a bank in Elliston, Kentucky, for $2,262 on April 6 and, turning back west, raided another in Whitehouse, Ohio, for $1,600 eight days later. On April 16, they were confronted by authorities when Miller was spotted by police in Bowling Green, resulting in a shootout. Floyd attempted to come to Miller's aid, killing Patrolman Ralph Castner, but Miller was already dead by the time the battle had ended. While Floyd was able to escape back to Oklahoma, Rose Ash and Beulah Baird, the latter being wounded during the gunfight, were both arrested and charged with harboring fugitives.
