= Aussie Elliott =

American bank robber

- Born: 1914; Oklahoma, United States
- Died: February 3, 1934 (aged 20) near Sapulpa, Oklahoma
- Cause of death: killed in police shootout
- Occupation: Bank robber
- Conviction: Armed robbery (1932)

Aussie Elliott (1914 – February 3, 1934) was an American Depression-era outlaw and associate of bank robbers George Birdwell and Charles "Pretty Boy" Floyd. Born in Oklahoma, Elliott was convicted of bank robbery in 1932 and sentenced to the Oklahoma State Penitentiary in McAlester, Oklahoma, eventually escaping on August 14, 1932. Soon after joining Birdwell and Floyd, the three robbed a bank in Sallisaw, Oklahoma, of $2,530. Although identified by witnesses raiding a bank in Henryetta of $11,352 only six days later, several reports attributed the robbery to the Ford Bradshaw gang.

== Crimes and death ==
Along with Adam Richetti and Edgar Dunbar (criminal), Elliott robbed $3,000 from a bank in Ash Grove, Missouri, on January 12, 1933, before fleeing to the home of Richetti's brother in Bolivar. Captured four months later in Creek County, Oklahoma, on May 14, Elliott was imprisoned for five months before again escaping on October 28, 1933. Despite the extensive manhunt by authorities, Elliott refused to flee Oklahoma and, along with bandits Raymond Moore, (Note: Moore was also known by the alias Dupert Carolan.) and Eldon Wilson, was found by police, acting on a tip, on February 3, 1934, at the home of Lee Davis, near Sapulpa, Oklahoma. As the officers drove up, they saw men scurrying away inside the house. Sapulpa Police Chief Tom Brumley went around one side of the house, while one of his officers went around the other toward the back door. The officer confronted two men, Elliott and Wilson, coming towards him, but they turned and ran back inside. When the police called on Elliott and Wilson to surrender, they heard a single shot come from the other side of the house. Moore (Duplin), trying to hide in the cellar, had killed Chief Brumley with the single shot. A gun battle at the front door, which was covered by Creek County Sheriff, Willis C. Strange, and Sapulpa patrolmen, W. E. Gage and Floyd Sellers, resulted in the deaths of Elliott and Wilson.

Moore managed to escape from the house and began a running gun battle with police, including several additional men who had just arrived at the scene. After reaching an area of rocks and hills, he tried to hide in a ditch while the officers looked for him. Sapulpa police officer C. P. Lloyd found him. Both men shot each other, and Lloyd died almost immediately. Other officers came quickly and killed Moore with gunfire.

Other lawmen participating in the action at Davis' house were Creek County Sheriff, Willis C. Strange, Sapulpa patrolmen, W. E. Gage and Floyd Sellers. These men were unharmed during the shootout.

== See also ==
- List of Depression-era outlaws
