= Robert Brady (criminal) =

American bank robber (1904–1934)

Robert "Big Bob" Brady
- Born: 1904; Oklahoma, United States
- Died: January 22, 1934 (aged 30) near Paola, Kansas
- Cause of death: Gunshot wounds
- Occupation: Bank robber
- Spouse: Leona Brady
- Status: Escaped from Lansing in 1934, killed after three days on the run
- Conviction: Armed robbery
- Penalty: Life imprisonment

Robert G. "Big Bob" Brady (1904 – January 22, 1934) was an American bank robber and Depression-era outlaw. A well-known Oklahoma bandit during the 1920s and 1930s, Brady was associated with Wilbur Underhill, Harvey Bailey and Jim Clark.

== Biography ==
=== Early life and criminal career ===
Born in Oklahoma in 1904, Brady was first arrested in Kansas for larceny at age 15. He was sent to the State Industrial Reformatory in Hutchinson for five years. Brady continued his criminal career, serving time for forgery, petty theft and other minor offences, and was imprisoned in Oklahoma for forgery in 1922 and armed robbery in 1925. Upon his release in 1931, Brady joined Clarence "Buck" Adams in the robbery of $5,300 from a bank in Texhoma, Oklahoma on September 15, 1931. Brady and his partner were captured by Sheriff O.L. Clark eleven days later at Carlsbad Cavern in New Mexico and immediately transferred to the county lockup in Amarillo, Texas. Brady attempted to escape during this time and sustained a serious head wound, the bullet very narrowly missing his brain, and was taken to Epworth Hospital in Liberal, Kansas where he underwent surgery. He would have to wear glasses for the rest of his life and could not completely close his left eyelid. The following month, by the time Brady had recovered, he was transferred to the state prison in McAlester, Oklahoma.

=== Escape and Midwest crime spree ===
Brady escaped from McAlester on July 23, 1932, and went on to embark on a five-month crime spree in at least five states. He stopped briefly in Ada, Oklahoma to visit his brother, who ran a local real estate brokerage, and while there robbed the same bank he had held up prior to his arrest the previous year. He then headed east raiding another bank in El Dorado Springs, Missouri and, on October 1, he stole a new car from a dealership in Liberal, Kansas. The next day, with Frank Philpot, he raided a bank in Springer, New Mexico. He was finally captured on December 20 after being spotted by police in Des Moines, Iowa. At the time of his arrest, he was found with a .38 revolver and a police badge stolen from an Oklahoma sheriff's deputy. Although wanted in four other states, he was tried in Kansas and sentenced to life imprisonment in Lansing.

=== Bailey-Underhill Gang ===
After five months inside, Brady escaped from Lansing in a mass escape which included Harvey Bailey, Wilbur Underhill, Jim Clark and seven other inmates on May 30, 1933. He remained on the run with Bailey, Underhill and Clark later joining them on a bank job in Black Rock, Arkansas on June 16. On July 3, they robbed a bank in Clinton, Oklahoma for $11,000 and hit another in Kingfisher, Oklahoma on August 9. Two days after their latest robbery, he and the rest of the Bailey-Underhill gang met near Shawnee, Oklahoma to plan a bank heist in Brainerd, Minnesota. The following day, Bailey was arrested by federal agents during a raid on a ranch owned by George "Machine Gun" Kelly. With Bailey in custody, the Brainerd job was abandoned. Brady was also a suspect in the Kansas City Massacre. One of the three surviving federal agents, Reed Vetterli, wrote that he was "convinced" Brady was one of the gunmen. A little over a year later, however, Vetterli and the other agents agreed it was Pretty Boy Floyd.

After Underhill headed off on his own, he and Clark decided to lie low for a while and took their "gun molls" to Arizona. Two months later, they returned in Oklahoma and hit a bank in Frederick for $5,000 on October 6. The outlaws escaped with $5,000 but missed nearly $80,000 in the bank vault and the teller cages in their rush to make their getaway. The robbery soon turned from bad to worse when they were forced to take three hostages, switch to a second getaway car in Indiahoma and race across Texas in an attempt to reach New Mexico. When police found their first car, they discovered a map marking their escape route and were able to phone ahead to authorities in New Mexico. Brady and Clark were eventually caught in Tucumcari, Oklahoma authorities waiving the bank robbery charges, and both were returned to Lansing. Brady had been shot by police during this time and Vetterli, who visited him while recovering in hospital, failed to identify him from Union Station.

=== Death ===
He and Clark were put in solitary confinement upon their return to Lansing. They gradually regained their prison privileges over a three-month period and, on January 19, 1934, Brady took part in yet another major prison break escaping with Clark and five others while on kitchen work detail. Once on the outside, he and Clark split up to go off on his own while his former partner joined fellow escapee Frank Delmar in a near-seven-month crime spree. Brady lasted only three more days on the run when authorities finally caught up with him. Trapped on a farm near Paola, Kansas, he attempted to engage in a shootout with Undersheriff Harvey Ray Lininger and Deputy Ed Schlotman but when his shotgun misfired, the officers opened fire and killed him. His death brought considerable attention to the area and reportedly around 2,500 people came to view his body in the local mortuary before it was sent to Oklahoma for burial.
