= Jim Clark (criminal) =

American bank robber

- Born: February 7, 1902; Mountainburg, Arkansas, United States
- Died: June 9, 1974 (aged 72); Oklahoma
- Occupation: Bank robber
- Status: Paroled in 1969
- Conviction: Armed robbery
- Penalty: 99 years imprisonment

Jim Clark (February 26, 1902 – June 9, 1974) was an American bank robber and Depression-era outlaw. A longtime career criminal in Oklahoma during the 1920s, Clark was associated with Wilbur Underhill, Harvey Bailey and Robert "Big Bob" Brady and remained a public enemy in the state of Kansas until his capture and imprisonment in 1934.

== Early life and criminal career ==
Jim Clark was born in Mountainburg, Arkansas on February 26, 1902. In 1923, the 21-year-old Clark was arrested in Oklahoma and sent to the state reformatory in Granite. He was eventually released from the reformatory and drifted to Texas where he found work in the oil fields. By 1927, he had begun smuggling bootleg liquor across the border from Juarez, Mexico and was jailed for 30 days after a botched robbery that same year. Returning to Oklahoma, he was again arrested for burglary and sentenced to five years imprisonment on March 31, 1928.

Clark was released after serving less than a year of his sentence and quickly returned to his criminal career. On March 14, 1932, he was sentenced to two years in prison for stealing a car in Sequoyah County, Oklahoma. Six weeks later, Clark officially became a fugitive when he walked off from the prison camp in Colby on April 25. His escape lasted only briefly however when he was arrested with Frank Sawyer and Ed Davis riding in a stolen car near Rich Hill, Missouri on June 17. Their arrest occurring hours after the robbery of $47,000 from a bank in Fort Scott, Kansas, in reality having been committed by the Barker Gang, Clark and his two accomplices were wrongly convicted of the robbery and imprisoned at the state penitentiary at Lansing.

== Time with the Bailey-Underhill gang ==
On May 30, 1933, Clark was one of 11 convicts who escaped with Underhill from Lansing using pistols smuggled inside the prison from friends. Authorities later believed Frank "Jelly" Nash was responsible for having orchestrated the mass escape. Clark and another escapee, Clifford Dopson, became separated from the others shortly after their escape. They managed to hitch a ride on Route 66 with a young Joliet couple the next morning and, drawing their guns, took them hostage. They forced the couple, B.K. Blair and Alice Braithwaite, to drive until reaching Neosho, Missouri whereupon they released them and took over their car. During the ride, one of the convicts claimed they "had to kill a bull last night" which may have referred to the murder of World War I war hero police officer Otto Durkee in Chetopa, Kansas.

Clark spent the next several weeks on the run with Wilbur Underhill, Harvey Bailey and Robert "Big Bob" Brady, briefly hiding out in Cookson Hills, Oklahoma, before hitting their first bank together. On July 3, Clark and the others robbed $11,000 from a bank in Clinton, Oklahoma and then, seven weeks later, raided another bank in Kingfisher on August 7. Plans to rob another bank in Brainerd, Minnesota fell through when Bailey was arrested by federal agents three days later while visiting George "Machine Gun" Kelly's ranch in Paradise, Texas. Underhill also left around this time leaving Clark and Brady to continue on their own.

Their last robbery together turned into a disaster when they attempted to hold up a bank in Frederick, Oklahoma on October 6, 1933. They escaped with only $5,000, missing $80,000 in the vault and the teller's cages, and took three hostages with them as they made their getaway. After switching cars in Indiahoma, they raced across Texas heading for New Mexico. When police discovered the first getaway car, police found a map charting their escape route and telephoned ahead to New Mexico authorities with a description of the fugitives. Clark and Brady were stopped near Tucumcari, New Mexico and, although Clark gave his name as "F.N. Atwood", authorities believed Clark was Wilbur Underhill before fingerprints established his identity. The charges against the two for their latest crime spree were waived as both men were returned to serve the rest of their sentence in Lansing.

== Partnership with Frank Delmar ==
Clark and Brady were placed into solitary confinement upon their arrival in Lansing. Restrictions on their movements were gradually relaxed over the next three months and, on January 19, 1934, he and Brady took part in yet another prison break when they and five other inmates escaped from a kitchen work detail. Clark and Brady split up soon after they got on the outside, with Clark joining Frank Delmar in kidnapping schoolteacher Louis Dresser. The two drove his car to Oklahoma where they released their hostage once they met with Clark's girlfriend Goldie Johnson who was waited for them with a car. Dresser was apparently so upset by the incident that he mistakenly identified Johnson as Bonnie Parker.

He and Demar soon began robbing banks in Kansas and Oklahoma. In one of their first robberies together, he and Delmar raided a bank in Goodland, Kansas for $2,000 on February 9. Clark was shot in both feet during their escape by a police officer shooting from underneath a nearby car. He spent the next three months recovering from his wounds and, on May 9, robbed a bank in Wetumka, Oklahoma for $500. On May 31, he returned with Delmar to the same bank in Kingfisher that he had robbed with Underhill, Bailey and Brady in August 1933.

After robbing another bank in Crescent, Oklahoma on June 20, he revisited the same Clinton bank he had robbed with his old partners the previous year and stole $13,000. He and Goldie Johnson were also suspected of robbing a bank in Oxford, Kansas, but both denied this and no charges were ever filed.

== Capture and imprisonment ==
By the summer of 1934, Clark had been declared a "public enemy" and Kansas governor personally offered a $200 reward for his capture as did the state banking association. A special police unit was established by Kansas authorities who finally tracked him down in Tulsa and arrested him on August 1. Clark was later tried and convicted on federal bank robbery charges and given a 99-year prison sentence. On January 14, 1935, Clark was sent to Leavenworth where he spent two years before his transfer to Alcatraz in 1937. Repeated disciplinary infractions forced his return to Leavenworth a year later where he reportedly assumed control of illegal gambling and loan shark for the next decade.

His activities were eventually discovered by prison officials and Clark was sent back to Alcatraz in January 1948. He remained there for over twelve years until his eventual return to Leavenworth in 1960 and then to Seagoville, Texas nine years later.

== Release and later years ==
After thirty-five years in prison, Clark was released on parole on December 9, 1969. The 67-year-old Clark returned to Oklahoma to marry the widow of his brother and where he would spend the rest of his life. He worked as a ranch hand for several years and, when old age prevented him continuing, Clark managed a commercial parking lot for a local bank until his death on June 9, 1974.
