= J. T. Nickel Family Nature and Wildlife Preserve =

Nature reserve in Oklahoma, United States

Coordinates: 36°02′N 94°51′W

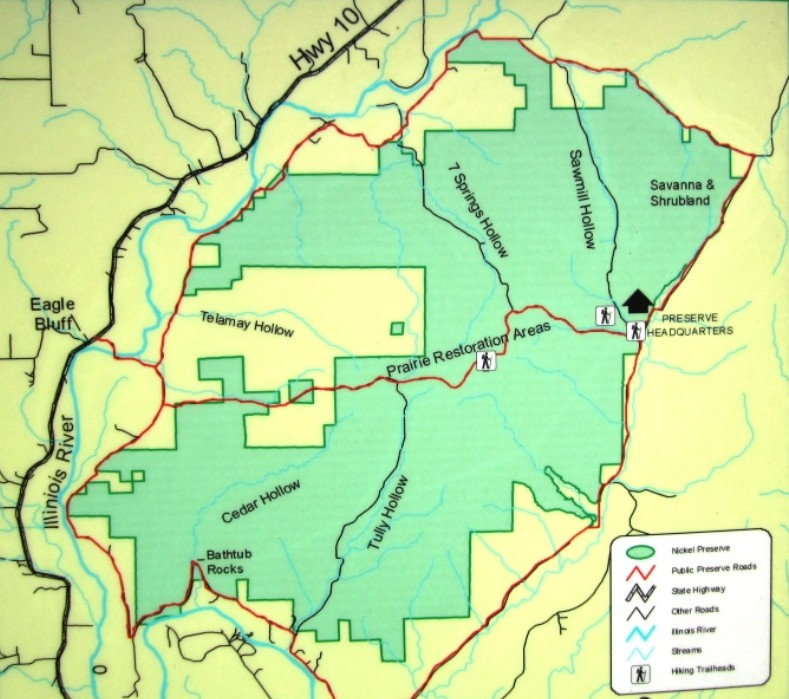
A map of the J.T. Nickel Preserve.

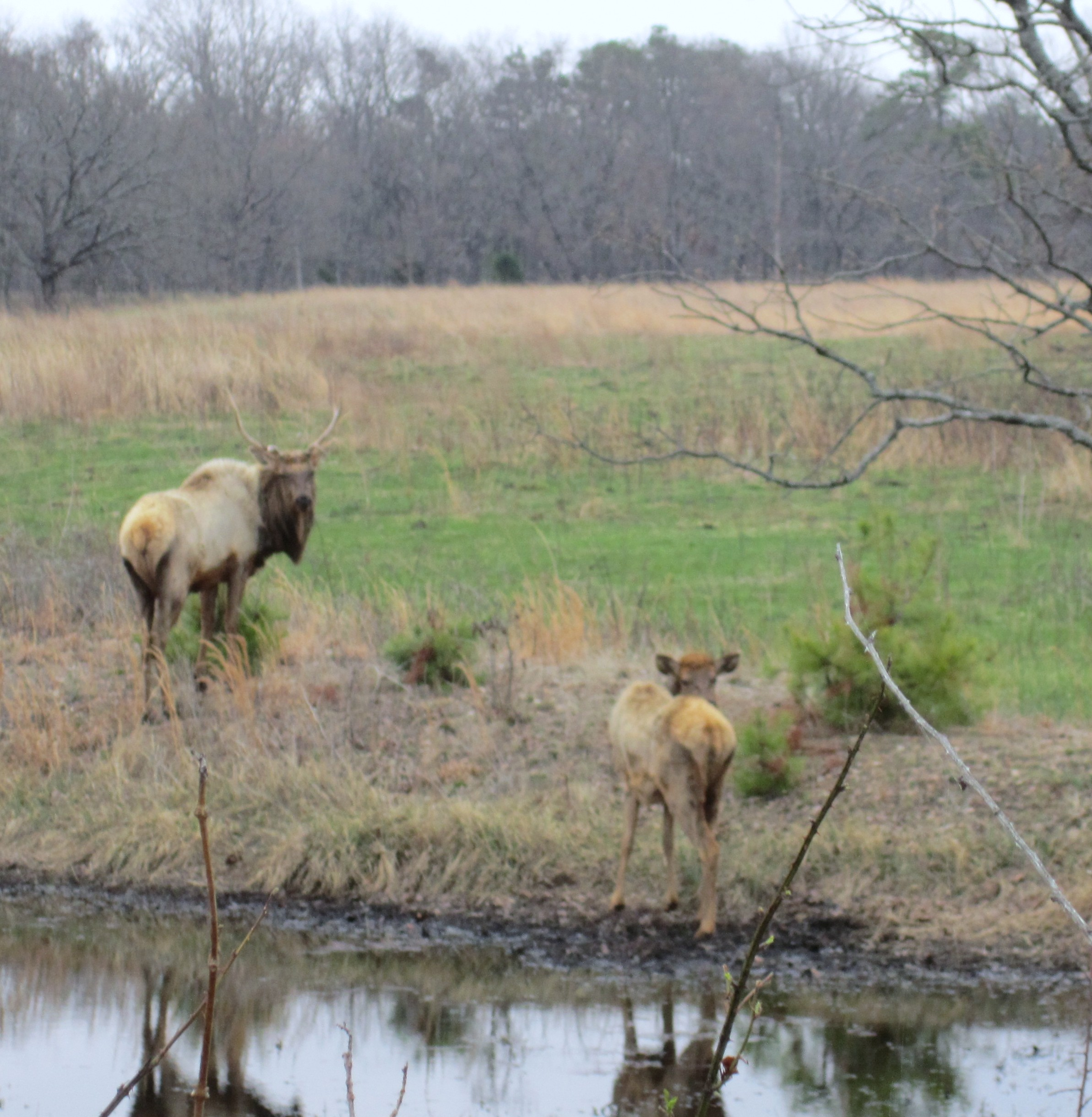
A bull and cow elk near the Wetland Trail in the Preserve. They are grazing new green grass that has sprouted in a prairie that was burned the previous fall.

The J.T. Nickel Family Nature and Wildlife Preserve, located in Cherokee County, Oklahoma is privately owned and managed by the Oklahoma Nature Conservancy. The preserve contains 17,000 acres (6,900 ha) of forest and grassland. Spring-fed creeks meander amid a rugged topography of steep slopes and narrow valleys harboring a mosaic of oak-hickory forest, lofty pine woodland, and a diverse mix of savanna, shrubland, and prairie. Elk have been reintroduced at the Preserve

== Description ==
The Nickel Family Preserve is located in the forested and rocky Cookson Hills region of eastern Oklahoma. Elevations on the refuge range from 850 feet (260 m) to 1,250 feet (380 m). The preserve was founded in 2000 due to a land gift from the John Nickel family. It is the largest privately owned conservation area in the Ozark Mountains.

Most of the Preserve is forested with oak and pine trees mixed with tallgrass prairie. Through controlled burns, The Nature Conservancy helps re-create the open woodland and biological diversity that characterized this region in pre-settlement days. There are seven vegetation zones: Xeric (dry) forests; Mesic (moist) forests; floodplains, glades, tallgrass prairie, wetlands, and disturbed areas. A total of 597 plant species have been found on the Preserve, including 15 rare, endangered or threatened plant species.

The Nature Conservancy has introduced Elk which have been absent from the Ozarks for more than 150 years. White tailed deer, coyote, bobcat, and many small mammals are also common in the preserve and black bears now make their home on the preserve after being absent for over a century.

== Bathtub Rocks ==
Bathtub Rocks is an area owned by the Nature Conservancy that lies within the J.T. Nickel Family Nature and Wildlife Preserve. Cold, fresh water flows over the rocks from a nearby spring before draining into Cedar Creek, a tributary of the Illinois River.

In the last few years vandalism and littering have become more than a nuisance in this area, costing the Nature Conservancy scarce funds to try to keep the area clean for visitors. The Conservancy has closed Bathtub Rocks to the public, due to the willful and negligent activity that had continued. As of 7-7-21 Bathtub Rocks has been permanently closed due to vandalism and trespassing.

== Facilities ==
The headquarters building is staffed only on weekdays. There are no facilities other than at the headquarters building. No hunting, fishing, or camping is allowed on the preserve.

The Nickel Preserve is open every day to the public. The trails are open during daylight hours 7 days a week. Access to other areas of the preserve may be arranged by contacting the preserve manager. Several dirt roads traverse the preserve and three walking trails are maintained. The interconnected Pine Ridge and Savannah trails depart from the headquarters and are three miles in length. The Wetland Trail, about three miles from the headquarters, is one mile long and circles a pond and swamp on a grassy plateau.
