= Vernon C. Miller =

American criminal (1896-1933

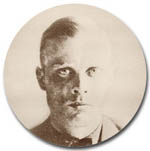
- Photo from FBI Files.
- Born: August 25, 1896; Kimball, South Dakota, United States
- Died: circa November 29, 1933 (aged 37); Detroit, Michigan, United States
- Known for: Only identified gunman involved in the Kansas City Massacre.
- Partner: Vi Matthias

Vernon C. "Verne" Miller (August 25, 1896 – November 29, 1933) was a freelance Prohibition hitman, bootlegger, bank robber and the former sheriff of Beadle County, South Dakota. He was the only identified gunman in the Kansas City massacre, and was found beaten and strangled to death shortly after the incident.

== Early life ==
Born into a family of Scotch-Irish descent in Kimball, South Dakota, Miller moved 35 miles northeast to Huron in 1914 and began working as an auto mechanic. Two years later Miller enlisted in the U.S. Army, seeing action with the Pancho Villa Expedition into Mexico, launched after the Mexican Revolution repeatedly spilled across the border. After American entry into World War I, Miller served in France with the 18th Infantry Regiment, 1st Brigade Combat Team, 1st U.S. Infantry Division, American Expeditionary Forces (AEF). Decorated with the Croix de Guerre by the Government of the Third French Republic for courage under enemy fire, Miller rose to the rank of color sergeant by the 1918 Armistice.

After being discharged from the military, Miller returned to Huron and joined the city's police force as a patrolman. Resigning from the Huron Police Department in May 1920, he ran for Sheriff of Beadle County, eventually winning the election in November. Within two years, however, Miller reportedly tired of the job and fled the area in early 1922 after stealing $2,600 in county funds. Within a year, Miller was tracked down by investigators and convicted of embezzlement on April 4, 1923.

While imprisoned at the South Dakota State Penitentiary, Miller became the warden's personal chauffeur. He was granted parole in November 1924.

== Prohibition ==
By the time of Miller's release, Prohibition was in full effect in the country and Miller readily entered the lucrative, although at times dangerous, occupational field of bootlegging. He was fined $200 for bootlegging by a Sioux Falls, South Dakota, court in October 1925, but had a clear record for several years thereafter.

During the late 1920s, after years of heavy drug abuse and suffering from advanced syphilis, Miller became increasingly unstable, and he was often given to unpredictable bursts of violence. He was indicted on February 3, 1928 for the wounding of two Minneapolis police officers, but the case against him was dropped owing to lack of evidence.

== From Prohibition gun for hire to Depression-era outlaw ==
As the end of the decade approached, Miller was widely known as a freelance gunman for Midwest bootleggers and racketeers. Due to Verne Miller's excellent marksmanship, allegedly there was a joke among the gangsters that Miller can "sign" his name with a Thompson submachine gun.

According to declassified FBI files, Miller carried out contract killings for both Jewish- and Italian-American organized crime; including Lepke Buchalter of Murder, Inc., the Purple Gang of Detroit, and the Chicago Outfit of Al Capone.

On May 31, 1930, after the brother of a friend of Miller's, Eugene "Red" McLaughlin, was killed by members of Al Capone's Chicago Outfit, (McLaughlin's body was found in a Chicago Canal) Miller tracked down three of the suspects to a resort hotel in Fox Lake, Illinois and gunned them down on June 1. Later known as the Fox Lake Massacre, this event was first attributed to members of George Moran's North Side Gang.

With the end of Prohibition approaching, Miller teamed up with Harvey Bailey, George "Machine Gun" Kelly and three others in a daylight raid resulting in the theft of $70,000 from a bank in Willmar, Minnesota, on July 15, 1930.

On August 13, in an argument over a "double-cross" from the bank robbery, Miller killed Frank "Weinie" Coleman, Mike Rusick and "Jew" Sammy Stein and dumped their bodies at White Bear Lake.

The murders did not seem to affect Miller's relationship with his accomplices as he again participated with Bailey, Holden, Keating, Kelly and Lawrence De Vol in robbing a bank in Ottumwa, Iowa, for $40,000 on September 9, 1930.

Again with Bailey, Kelly, Frank "Jelly" Nash and several others, Miller stole another $40,000 from a bank in Sherman, Texas, on April 8, 1931.

On December 16, 1932, during a bank robbery in Minneapolis, two policemen were killed by the Miller gang.

== Kansas City Massacre ==
Following the Sherman bank robbery, Miller retired from armed robbery in favor of murder for hire, although he continued to keep in contact with his former partners. It was through these contacts, specifically Chicago mobster Louis Stacci, that Miller was hired to free former partner Frank Nash from federal custody while he was being transported to Leavenworth Federal Penitentiary.

On June 17, 1933, Miller and several other unidentified gunmen ambushed federal agents as they arrived at Union Station in Kansas City, Missouri. After a brief yet violent gunfight—resulting in the deaths of Nash and four law enforcement officers, as well as the wounding of two others—Miller and the other gunmen fled the scene.

Although FBI Director J. Edgar Hoover named Charles "Pretty Boy" Floyd and Adam Richetti as participants in the event, the remaining gunmen were never identified.

In a subsequent conversation, Miller's former employer, Murder, Inc. leader Lepke Buchalter, told FBI agents, "No one will have anything to do with Miller now. If he shows up, you will know about it." When an FBI agent asked whether Miller was at risk of being, "bumped off", Buchalter, "responded with a knowing look", but said only, "I will have to look into that."

== Final days ==
After the Kansas City Massacre, Miller fled to the east coast, staying with New Jersey mobster Abner "Longy" Zwillman in Orange, New Jersey until Miller killed a Zwillman gunman in an argument. Leaving for Chicago on October 23, 1933, Miller posed as a salesman for an optical supply house while living with girlfriend Vi Mathias until Federal agents raided her apartment on the morning of November 1. Shooting his way out, however, Miller was able to escape from federal agents.

A month later, on November 29, a motorist discovered Miller's body dumped in a roadside ditch outside Detroit, Michigan. He had been severely tortured by partial strangulation with a clothesline and beaten thirteen times with a claw hammer.

Miller appeared to have been the victim of a contract killing by the National Crime Syndicate. Although the motive for Miller's grisly murder remains unclear, probable causes include retaliation for the murder of Zwillman's gang member one month earlier, punishment for the Kansas City Massacre, retribution for the Fox Lake Massacre, or all of the above and then some.

While being interrogated following his own arrest, former associate Machine Gun Kelly expressed a belief that the hitmen must have been people whom Miller knew and trusted, "Miller never went anyplace without being armed and never let anyone he did not know real well get close to him on account of there being any number of people who would have taken him... The ones who did get him were real close to him."

FBI agent Werner Hanni told reporters, "We wanted Miller badly, but whoever killed him probably saved us from having to do it."

FBI agent Melvin Purvis later wrote in his memoirs, "The underworld never forgave Miller for the Kansas City raid. Crime is a business and Verne Miller had become a debit; they wiped him off the ledger and the photograph of his mangled body, which I later saw, told a gruesome story of a cold and bloody murder."

Despite his lengthy criminal record, Verne Miller was buried with an honor guard from the American Legion and with full military honors in White Lake, South Dakota.

== Portrayal in movies ==
Miller's life is the subject of a 1987 movie directed by Rod Hewitt and released under the title The Verne Miller Story or Gangland: The Verne Miller Story in which Miller is portrayed by actor Scott Glenn.

== See also ==
- List of unsolved murders (1900–1979)

== Books ==
- Newton, Michael. Encyclopedia of Robbers, Heists, and Capers. New York: Facts On File Inc., 2002.
- Merle Clayton Union Station Massacre 1975 BM Bobbs Merrill ISBN 0-672-51899-6
