= George Birdwell =

American bank robber and associate of Pretty Boy Floyd (1894–1932)

- Born: February 19, 1894; Indian Territory, United States
- Died: November 23, 1932 (aged 38); Henryetta, Oklahoma
- Cause of death: Killed by police during a bank robbery
- Occupation: Bank robber
- Children: At least 1 child

George William Birdwell (February 19, 1894 - November 23, 1932) was an American bank robber and Depression-era outlaw. He was one of Pretty Boy Floyd's closest known associates and also teamed with a number of fellow Oklahoma-based bandits, most notably, William "Billy the Killer" Miller and Aussie Elliott.

== Biography ==
=== Early life and criminal career ===
George Birdwell was born in Indian Territory (present-day Oklahoma) in 1894, his ancestry being a mix of Irish, Cherokee and Choctaw. Published accounts of his background and early life are vague and inconsistent, however public records indicate that he was shot by a local farmer over an alleged affair with his wife when he was 18. While crime author Myron Quimby claimed that Birdwell began his life of crime during the 1920s committing 10 murders and robbed "countless" banks, he provided little evidence to support these claims of his early criminal career.

Birdwell's children and surviving descendants, however, have always maintained that Birdwell had worked as a farmer until meeting with bank robber Pretty Boy Floyd in 1930 and began robbing banks with him soon after. Indeed, local residents recalled Birdwell often passing out $20 to his neighbors during the Great Depression, particularly those affected by the Great Dust Bowl, and gained him considerable public support and sympathy.

=== Partnership with Pretty Boy Floyd ===
Birdwell's first recorded robbery was on March 9, 1931, when he and Floyd joined William "Billy the Killer" Miller in robbing a bank in Earlsboro, Oklahoma, for $3,000. Five months later, they raided another bank in nearby Shamrock but managed to get only $400(MORE DETAILS). They fared better several days later when they raided a bank in Morris, Oklahoma, for $1,743 on September 8 and scored another $3,850 from a bank in Maud three weeks later.

On October 19, he and Floyd returned to Earlsboro and robbed the same bank they had originally raided with Miller seven months before, this time getting $2,498. They continued on their crime spree stealing $2,500 in Konawa on November 5, 1931, and another $2,500 in Castle, Oklahoma, on January 14, 1932. He was also believed to have been the unidentified accomplice who helped Floyd rob $800 from a bank in Dover a week later.

By early-1932, bankers across the state were petitioning the governor to take action against Birdwell and Floyd. After Floyd began renting a home in Tulsa for his wife and child, a confrontation between police became even more likely. Soon afterwards, on February 7, police saw the two fugitives driving through the city and attempted to pursue but lost them after a wild gunfight which resulted in the shooting of a police officer. Three days later, they were again confronted by the authorities when police surrounded Floyd's home and attempted to force the outlaws out. Birdwell and Floyd managed to sneak out the back way as police fired tear gas into the house.

Birdwell and Floyd showed no signs of ceasing their activities despite their narrow escape as, six weeks after their escape from Tulsa, they robbed yet another bank in Meeker, Oklahoma, for $500 on March 23. When Birdwell's father died a month later, local sheriff's deputies staked out the funeral home in Earlsboro hoping to capture Birdwell if he showed up. The bandits did indeed arrive at the funeral home but unexpectedly turned the tables on the lawmen when Floyd held them at gunpoint while Birdwell was able to pay his last respects. The next day, on April 21, they took $600 from the cash drawers of a bank in Stonewall, Oklahoma.

While driving near Ada on June 7, Birdwell and Floyd were ambushed in a police trap, but managed to get away. Police sharpshooters later claimed that both men had most likely worn full body armor in order to have survived the gunfight. Five months later, he and Floyd committed one of their biggest bank jobs when they and Aussie Elliott stole $2,530 from a bank in Sallisaw, Oklahoma, on November 1. They were, however, wrongly accused by authorities of robbing a bank in Henryetta of $11,252 six days later.

=== Boley robbery and death ===
Shortly afterwards, perhaps encouraged by the Henryetta robbery, Birdwell came up with a plan to rob the Farmers and Merchants Bank in Boley, Oklahoma. Floyd objected to the proposal, pointing out that they would likely stand out in the heavily Black town and that local residents would most likely rush to the aid of the bank in the event of a robbery. Birdwell decided to go ahead with the robbery and recruited Charles Glass and C.C. Patterson. Birdwell failed to note that the day of the planned robbery, November 23, fell on the first day of bird-hunting season, and residents were stocking up on shotguns and ammunition.

The robbery proceeded as planned. Birdwell and his accomplices managed to gain entry into the bank. Birdwell, armed with a .45 caliber semi-automatic pistol, held everyone in the bank while Glass and Peterson looted the desk drawers. In one of the tellers' cages however, an automatic alarm was triggered when the last bills were taken. The alarm alerted bookmaker H. C. McCormick, who had been overlooked while at work in the back room. He confronted the men with a rifle, shooting Birdwell through the heart. Mortally wounded, Birdwell managed to kill bank president D. J. Turner before collapsing. Glass and Paterson attempted to flee, but by this time, local residents had been alerted by the gunfire and were waiting for them as they exited the bank. Glass was killed instantly and Patterson seriously wounded. He was saved by the town sheriff, who intervened before the mob could fire a second volley. Patterson eventually recovered from his wounds and was later sentenced to the state prison in McAlester.

Birdwell was found alive in the bank and was taken to a nearby hospital in Henryetta, but died shortly after his arrival. McCormick was later awarded $1,000 for his actions and made an honorary major in the state militia.

== How Much Money He Stole ==
George stole around about $32,173 from all the banks combined that he had robbed

== How Many People Did He Kill ==
George Birdwell was accused for committing at least 10 murders even though none of that seemed to be proved.
