= Kansas City massacre =

1933 shootout in Missouri, US

Coordinates: 39°05′05″N 94°35′07″W

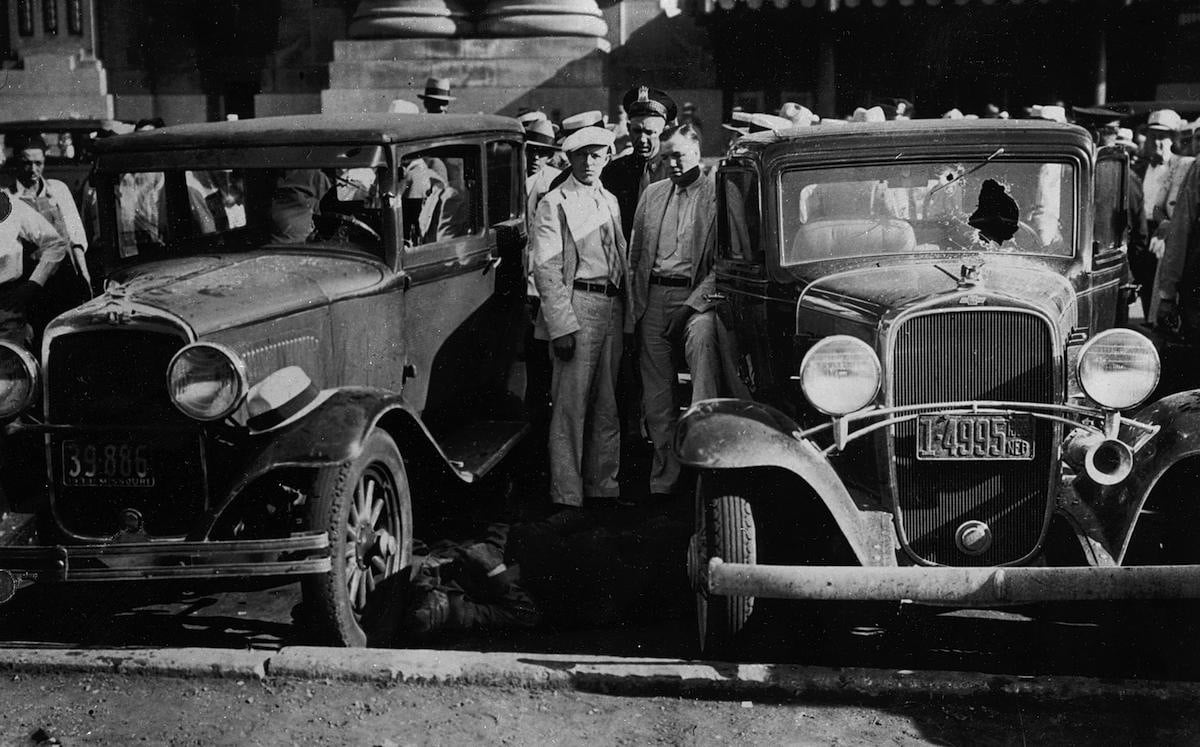
- Aftermath of the attack on June 17, 1933
- Location: Kansas City Union Station
- Date: June 17, 1933; 93 years ago (CDT)
- Deaths: 5 total: 4 police officers; 1 gang member
- Motive: To free gang member Frank "Jelly" Nash while he was being transferred from local to federal custody

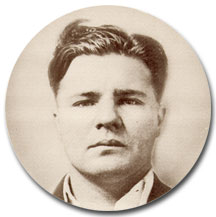
Charles Arthur "Pretty Boy" Floyd was a suspect in the shooting

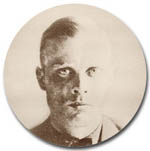
Vernon Miller was found dead during the FBI manhunt

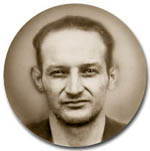
The FBI arrested Adam Richetti

The Kansas City massacre was the shootout and murder of four law enforcement officers and a criminal fugitive at the Union Station railroad depot in Kansas City, Missouri, on the morning of June 17, 1933. It occurred as part of the attempt by a gang led by Vernon C. "Verne" Miller to free Frank "Jelly" Nash, a federal prisoner. At the time, Nash was in the custody of several law enforcement officers who were returning him to the U.S. Penitentiary at Leavenworth, Kansas, from which he had escaped three years earlier.

Charles "Pretty Boy" Floyd was identified by the FBI as one of the gunmen. However, some evidence suggests that Floyd was not involved.

== Background ==
Frank Nash was first convicted in 1913. He and a friend, Nollie "Humpy" Wortman, stole nearly US$1,000 (equivalent to $32,600 in 2025) from a store in Sapulpa, Oklahoma. While escaping, Nash suggested they hide the evidence. As Wortman went to bury the money, Nash shot him in the back. Nash was arrested hours later and sentenced to life in the Oklahoma State Penitentiary. On March 28, 1918, Nash's sentence was reduced to ten years after he convinced the warden he wanted to join the army and fight in World War I. In 1920, Nash was convicted of burglary using explosives, also known as safe-cracking, and sentenced to 25 years in the Oklahoma State Penitentiary. He became a trusty, and his sentence was reduced to five years. On December 29, 1922, Nash was released. On March 3, 1924, Nash began a 25-year sentence at the United States Penitentiary, Leavenworth, in Kansas, for assaulting a mail custodian. He escaped on October 19, 1930.

The FBI launched an intensive search for Nash throughout the entire United States and most of Canada. After a thorough investigation, the FBI concluded that Nash had assisted in the escape of seven prisoners from the United States Penitentiary, Leavenworth, on December 11, 1931.

The investigation also disclosed that Nash had a very close association with Francis L. Keating, Thomas Holden, and several other gunmen who had participated in several bank robberies throughout the Midwest. Keating and Holden were apprehended by FBI agents on July 7, 1932, in Kansas City, Missouri. The pair had crucial information about the whereabouts of Nash and eventually divulged that he was hiding out in Hot Springs, Arkansas.

== Apprehension ==
With information in hand, two FBI agents, Frank Smith and Francis Joseph "Joe" Lackey, and McAlester, Oklahoma Police Chief Otto Reed ventured to Arkansas to find the escaped outlaw. After an exhaustive search, Nash was apprehended in a local store in Hot Springs on June 16, 1933. The three officials then drove Nash to Fort Smith, Arkansas, to board a train bound for Kansas City, Missouri, at 8:30 that night. The Missouri Pacific train's estimated time of arrival in Kansas City was 7:15 the next morning. Before traveling, the lawmen contacted Reed E. Vetterli, Special Agent in Charge (SAC) of the FBI's Kansas City office, to meet them at the train station upon arrival.

== Conspiracy ==
Several outlaw friends of Nash had heard of his capture in Hot Springs. They learned the time of the scheduled arrival of Nash and his captors in Kansas City and made plans to free him. The scheme was conceived and engineered by Richard Tallman Galatas, Herbert Farmer, "Doc" Louis Stacci, and Frank B. Mulloy. Vernon Miller was designated to free Nash, and while at Mulloy's tavern in Kansas City, he made several phone calls for assistance in the scheme. According to the official FBI report, Charles "Pretty Boy" Floyd and his sidekick Adam Richetti arrived in Kansas City to aid in the mission.

According to the FBI report, Floyd and Richetti happened to be on the way to Kansas City but had been detained at Bolivar, Missouri, early on the morning of the 16th, when the car in which they were riding became disabled. While the two were waiting in a local garage for the necessary repairs to the car, Sheriff Jack Killingsworth entered the building. Richetti, who immediately recognized the sheriff, seized a machine gun and held the sheriff and the garage attendants up against the wall. Floyd drew two .45 caliber machine pistols and ordered all parties to remain motionless. Floyd and Richetti then transferred their arsenal into another automobile and ordered the sheriff to enter that vehicle. The two, along with their prisoner, drove to Deepwater, Missouri, abandoned that automobile and commandeered another. After releasing the sheriff, they arrived in Kansas City about 10:00 p.m. on June 16. There, Floyd and Richetti abandoned that automobile and stole another car to which they transferred their baggage and firearms. Finally, that same night, they met Miller and went with him to his home. There Miller told them of his plan to free Frank Nash.

Early the next morning, according to the FBI account, Miller, Floyd, and Richetti drove to Union Station in a Chevrolet sedan. There they took up their positions to await the arrival of Nash and his captors.

== The massacre ==
Upon the arrival of the train in Kansas City, Agent Lackey went to the loading platform, leaving Smith, Reed, and Nash in a stateroom of the train. On the platform, he was met by SAC Vetterli, who was accompanied by FBI Agent Raymond J. Caffrey and officers W. J. Grooms and Frank Hermanson of the Kansas City Police Department. These men surveyed the area surrounding the platform and saw nothing that aroused their suspicion. SAC Vetterli advised Agent Lackey that he and Caffrey had brought two cars to Union Station and that the cars were parked immediately outside.

Agent Lackey then returned to the train and, accompanied by Chief Reed, SAC Vetterli, Agents Caffrey and Smith, and Officers Hermanson and Grooms, proceeded from the train through the lobby of Union Station. At the time, both Agent Lackey and Chief Reed were armed with shotguns. Other officers carried pistols. Frank Nash walked through Union Station with the seven officers.

Upon leaving Union Station, the lawmen, with their captive, paused briefly. Again, seeing nothing that aroused their suspicion, they proceeded to Caffrey's Chevrolet. Frank Nash was handcuffed throughout the trip from the train to the Chevrolet, which was parked directly in front of the east entrance of Union Station.

Agent Caffrey unlocked the right door of the Chevrolet. When the door was opened, Nash started to get into the back seat; however, Agent Lackey told Nash to get into the front of the car. Agent Lackey then climbed into the back of the car directly behind the driver's seat. Agent Smith sat beside him in the center of the back; and Chief Reed sat beside Smith in the right rear seat.

At this point, Agent Caffrey walked around the car to get into the driver's seat through the left door. SAC Vetterli stood with Officers Hermanson and Grooms at the right side near the front of the car.

A green Plymouth was parked about six feet away on the right side of Agent Caffrey's car. Looking in the direction of this Plymouth, Agent Lackey saw two men run from behind a car. He noticed that both men were armed, at least one of them with a machine gun.

Before Agent Lackey had a chance to warn his fellow officers, one of the gunmen shouted, "Up, up!" At this instant, Agent Smith, who was in the middle of the back seat, also saw a man with a machine gun to the right of the Plymouth. SAC Vetterli, who was standing at the right front of the Chevrolet turned just in time to hear a voice command, "Let 'em have it!"

At this point, from a distance approximately 15 feet diagonally to the right of Agent Caffrey's Chevrolet, an individual crouched behind the radiator of another car opened fire. Officers Grooms and Hermanson immediately fell to the ground, dead. SAC Vetterli, who was standing beside Officers Grooms and Hermanson, was shot in the left arm and dropped to the ground. As he attempted to scramble to the left side of the car to join Agent Caffrey, who had not yet entered the driver's seat of the Chevrolet, Vetterli saw Caffrey fall to the ground. He had been fatally wounded in the head.

Inside the car, Frank Nash and Chief Reed were killed. Agents Lackey and Smith were able to survive the massacre by falling forward in the back seat of the Chevrolet. Lackey was struck and seriously wounded by three bullets in the back. Smith was unscathed.

The three gunmen rushed to the lawmen's car and looked inside. One of them was heard to shout "They're all dead. Let's get out of here." With that, they raced toward a dark-colored Chevrolet. Just then a Kansas City policeman emerged from Union Station and began firing in the direction of one of the killers, later identified as Floyd, who slumped briefly but continued to run. The killers entered the car which sped westward out of the parking area and disappeared.

The three survivors, Agents Smith and Lackey and SAC Vetterli, reported that the assault lasted possibly 30 seconds. They were uncertain if three or four gunmen staged the assault. From their account, it was apparent that the two Kansas City police officers were killed immediately, followed seconds later by Frank Nash and Chief Reed and then by Agent Caffrey, who was taken to a hospital and pronounced dead on arrival.

== Aftermath ==
The FBI immediately initiated an investigation to identify and apprehend the gunmen. The investigation developed evidence that the scheme was carried out by Vernon C. Miller, Adam C. Richetti, and Pretty Boy Floyd. The evidence included latent fingerprint impressions located by FBI Agents on beer bottles in Miller's Kansas City home and identified as those of Adam Richetti, thus helping to link the latter to the crime.

=== Claims of innocence ===
The FBI account—including Floyd's involvement—has been disputed in three books: Joe Urschel's The Year of Fear (2015), Robert Unger's Union Station Massacre: The Original Sin of J. Edgar Hoover's FBI (1997) and Michael Wallis's Floyd biography Pretty Boy (1994). The authors believe that Floyd and Richetti were framed by the FBI. The matter is likely to remain highly controversial, as evidence against the two men is far from conclusive. Urschel and Wallis maintain that the massacre is completely out of character with the rest of Floyd's known career. Additionally, longtime underworld figure Blackie Audett wrote in Rap Sheet (1954) that Floyd and Richetti weren't involved, and that the other two gunmen were really Maurice Denning and William Weissman, brother of noted racketeer Saul "Solly" Weissman. Bryan Burrough, author of Public Enemies: America's Greatest Crimewave and the Birth of the FBI, 1933-1934 (2007), asserts that Floyd "almost certainly was" guilty of taking part in the massacre, citing the testimony of several underworld informants arrested by the FBI; however, their testimony has been contradicted by those of other informants and witnesses.

=== Death of Miller ===
On November 29, 1933, during the FBI's search for Miller, his mutilated naked body was found in a ditch on the outskirts of Detroit, Michigan. He had apparently been killed as a result of a run-in with a criminal gang in New Jersey. Several authors, including Jay Robert Nash, have used Miller's death to argue that the Massacre was not a rescue attempt, but a syndicate hit meant to silence Frank Nash, who had extensive underworld connections.

=== Arrest of Richetti ===
Richetti and Floyd were involved in an automobile accident in Wellsville, Ohio, on October 20, 1934, in which the automobile that Floyd was driving crashed into a telephone pole. Police Chief J. H. Fultz went out to investigate and a shootout took place with Floyd and Richetti. Chief Fultz apprehended Richetti after Richetti had emptied his gun at the officer. Floyd escaped, but the Police Chief thought Floyd might have been wounded.

Adam Richetti was returned to Kansas City. He was tried for the murders in the Kansas City Massacre and was convicted on June 17, 1935, approximately two years after the massacre. He was sentenced to death. Following appeals and resentencing, he was executed on October 7, 1938.

=== Death of Floyd ===
After an intensive search, the FBI and a team of local police officers located Pretty Boy Floyd hiding on a farm just outside Clarkson, Ohio, on October 22, 1934. Floyd shot it out with the law enforcement officers and was killed in the shootout. At the time Floyd was killed, a watch and fob, consisting of a "lucky piece", were found on his person. Groups of ten notches were found on each of these items –reportedly carved by Floyd as an indication of the number of people he had killed. With his dying breath Floyd denied he was involved in the shooting.

=== Conspirators ===
The four individuals who aided in the conspiracy—Richard Galatas, Herbert Farmer, "Doc" Louis Stacci, and Frank Mulloy—were indicted by a federal grand jury at Kansas City, Missouri, on October 24, 1934. On January 4, 1935, the four were found guilty of conspiracy to cause the escape of a federal prisoner from the custody of the United States. On the following day, each was sentenced to serve two years in a Federal Penitentiary and pay a fine of $10,000, the maximum penalty allowed by law.

=== Changes at the FBI ===
The Kansas City Massacre changed the FBI. Previously, the agency did not have authority to carry firearms (although some agents reportedly did) and make arrests (they could make a "citizen's arrest", then call a U.S. Marshal or local law officer), but one year later Congress gave the FBI statutory authority to carry guns and make arrests (in May and June 1934). The FBI acquired its first Thompson submachine guns and Winchester Model 1907 self-loading rifles. But, after requesting that Remington Arms provide a replacement for the Winchester, the agency later adopted specially modified variants of the Remington Model 81 semi-automatic rifle.

== In popular culture ==
The FBI Story depicts the massacre. A TV movie titled Kansas City Massacre directed by Dan Curtis was broadcast in 1975. The paranormal show Ghost Adventures investigated Union Station in Season 7 for the potential residual hauntings by the victims. A graphic novel titled Union Station was originally written by Ande Parks. On August 3, 2015, Gangland Wire documentary filmmaker Gary Jenkins published a 3-episode true crime story podcast about the Union Station Massacre.

== See also ==
- 2024 Kansas City parade shooting
- 1986 FBI Miami shootout
- List of massacres in Missouri
