= Cookson Hills =

Hills in Oklahoma, United States

Coordinates: 35.7°N 94.8°W

The Cookson Hills are in eastern Oklahoma. They are an extension of the Boston Mountains of Arkansas to the east and the southwestern margin of the Ozark Plateau. They lie generally between Stilwell, Sallisaw and Tahlequah. The area became part of the Cherokee Nation in the early 20th century until 1907, when Oklahoma became a state.

== History ==
The Depression-era bank robber Charles Arthur ("Pretty Boy") Floyd was raised in the Cookson Hills.

== Geography ==
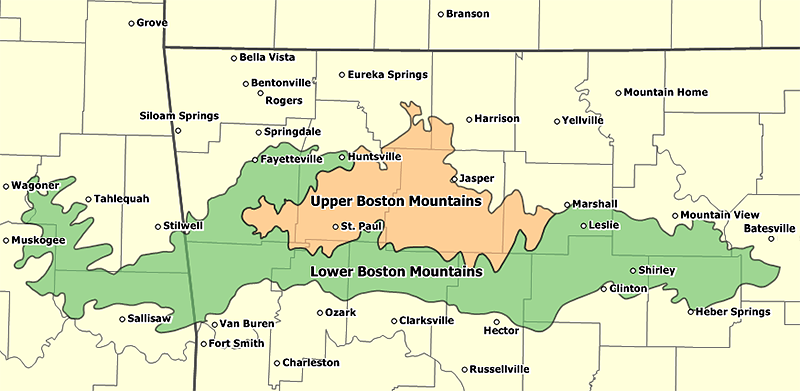
The Cooksons are the western extension of the Boston Mountains of Arkansas into eastern Oklahoma.

The region is a rugged dissected plateau with numerous peaks and ridges up to 1,500 feet (460 m) above sea level. The Cooksons are drained by tributaries of the Illinois River (Arkansas). They are heavily wooded, predominantly oak, with patches of black walnut and hickory trees. The J. T. Nickel Family Nature and Wildlife Preserve is located in the Cookson Hills. It is the largest nature preserve in the region.
