= Frank Nash =

American bank robber (1887–1933)

- Born: February 6, 1887; Birdseye, Indiana, United States
- Died: June 17, 1933 (aged 46); Kansas City, Missouri, United States
- Cause of death: Gunshot wounds
- Other name: Jelly
- Occupations: Murder; robbery
- Known for: One of the most successful bank robbers during the 1920s.
- Spouse: Frances Luce

Frank Nash (February 6, 1887 – June 17, 1933) was an American bank robber, and has been called "the most successful bank robber in U.S. history." He is most noted for his violent death in the Kansas City Massacre. Nash spent part of his childhood in Paragould, Arkansas (Greene County) and was arrested in Hot Springs, Arkansas (Garland County) the day before his death.

== Early life ==
Frank "Jelly" Nash was born on February 6, 1887, in Birdseye, Indiana. His father, John "Pappy" Nash, started hotels in several southern towns, including Paragould and Jonesboro (Craighead County) Arkansas, and Hobart, Oklahoma. Nash's mother, Alta, was the second of John's three wives. Nash had two sisters and two stepbrothers. Living in Paragould from 1893 to 1896, he then moved with his father to Jonesboro and, afterward, to Hobart, which he later treated as his hometown.

== Criminal life ==
=== Early robberies ===
Nash worked in his father's hotels and also served in the U.S. Army from 1904 to 1907. He later served three prison sentences for various crimes, including robbery and murder. Nash is thought to have participated in roughly 200 bank robberies and was often considered the "mastermind" of several groups of criminals. He planned various escapes from prison, both from within the prison and while free. In spite of his criminal record, Nash was widely considered friendly, likeable, and charming. His nickname, "Jelly" (shortened from "Jellybean"), began during his childhood, due to his poise and his well-groomed appearance (although some associate the nickname with the explosives used to open bank safes).

Nash's first known run-in with the law occurred in 1910, when he was charged with burglary in Comanche County, Oklahoma. In May 1911, he was charged with burglary again, this time for the bungled attempt in March of that year to crack safes and empty cash registers at four stores in Gotebo, Oklahoma. Initially, Guy Huber and his close friend Nollie "Humpy" Wartman were charged in the crime, but only Wartman was convicted, because a safecracking tool called a "triangle" in contemporary newspaper reports was traced back to him. After his conviction, Wartman – angry that he was the only one of the three sentenced to prison in the crime – implicated Huber and Nash in the burglaries, and both were charged and tried. Wartman's testimony earned him an acquittal, and Nash and Huber were acquitted on a technicality, but their bitterness lingered, apparently. Wartman fled to Texas after the trial, spending two years there before returning to his mother's farm near Hobart, and on March 5, 1913, he visited the town itself. After some drinking, Huber and Nash lured Wartman to a remote area of Hobart under the pretext of getting his help selling stolen silks. Once the three were seated, according to the March 13, 1913, edition of the Hobart Republican, Wartman was "shot at close range with a 32 or 38 caliber pistol, the ball entering the right temple and coming out over the left eye." Blinded but alive and conscious until his death a few weeks later, on March 28 of that year, Wartman implicated Huber and Nash in his murder. Huber was convicted of Wartman's murder and given a life sentence in May 1913. Nash was sentenced to life for the murder in August 1913. On March 28, 1918, Nash's sentence was reduced to ten years after he convinced the warden he wanted to join the army and fight in World War I. Nash signed his military registration card on June 12, 1918, and was released on August 16, 1918. Nash saw action in Belleau Wood, France, before the end of the war. (The fighting in Belleau Wood ended in June, 1918, and the war ended November 11 of that year).

Two years later, Nash was convicted of burglary using explosives, also known as safe-cracking, and sentenced to twenty-five years in the Oklahoma State Penitentiary. He became a trusty, and his sentence was reduced to five years. On December 29, 1922, Nash was released, and he joined the Al Spencer gang, a group of bank robbers.

On August 20, 1923, the Spencer gang robbed the Katy Limited postal train at Okesa, Oklahoma. Nash fled to Juárez, Mexico, where he married a local woman. Many sources claim that Nash hoped to falsify the date on the marriage license to provide him an alibi for the time of the train robbery. The same sources also state that Nash was already married to a sweetheart from Hobart, but the names of his first two wives are not known. His military registration card indicates that he was single in 1918.

Nash was enticed across the Mexico–United States border and arrested for the burglary of the Katy Limited in early 1924. On March 1, Nash and three members of the Spencer gang received twenty-five-year sentences at the federal penitentiary at Leavenworth, Kansas, for mail robbery and assault on a mail custodian. In 1930, Nash was appointed the deputy warden's chef and general handyman, a position that brought privileges. On October 19, 1930, Nash was sent outside the prison on an errand and never returned.

Nash escaped to Chicago, Illinois, where he fell in love with a barmaid named Frances Luce and continued his criminal activities, now in the major cities of the United States. Among other crimes during these years, Nash assisted in the escape of seven prisoners from Fort Leavenworth in December 1931.

Nash visited Hot Springs with Frances Luce and her daughter in the spring of 1932 and returned with them the following spring. Hot Springs was then known as a playground for members of the criminal underworld. Without telling her about his first two wives, Nash married Luce on May 26, 1933. The two adopted the last name of Moore.

== Death ==
=== Arrest in Hot Springs ===
On June 15, 1933, two Oklahoma City Federal Bureau of Investigation (FBI) agents, Joe Lackey and Frank Smith, learned that Nash was in Hot Springs. The agents drove to Hot Springs accompanied by Otto Reed, the police chief of McAlester, Oklahoma, as FBI agents were forbidden from carrying weapons and making arrests during that time period. They learned that Nash was frequently found in the White Front Cigar Store, which was owned by Richard Galatas and frequented by many criminals of a national stature. On June 16, the agents arrested Nash and drove to Fort Smith, Arkansas (Sebastian County).

That night, Nash, accompanied by Lackey, Smith, and Reed, boarded a Missouri Pacific train bound for Kansas City, Missouri. However, word of Nash's capture had gotten around, as well as the destination of the agents, and plans were apparently made to attempt to free him.

=== Massacre ===
After arriving at the Kansas City Union Station at 7:15 a.m. on June 17, 1933, and meeting additional agents, Nash was put into a parked car outside the station. Two or three armed men approached the car, and many shots were exchanged. Accounts differ regarding who fired first, but what is known is that in the end, Nash was killed, as were Reed, FBI agent Raymond Caffrey, and Kansas City Police detectives W. J. "Red" Grooms and Frank Hermanson. Based on the testimony of the surviving agents, authorities sought Charles "Pretty Boy" Floyd, Floyd's partner Adam Richetti, and Vernon Miller as suspects. Miller was later found murdered in Detroit. Floyd, who became "Public Enemy Number One" after the July 1934 death of John Dillinger, was killed by the FBI in Ohio in October 1934, denying to the end any involvement in the massacre. However, Richetti was arrested in Ohio, tried and convicted for the Kansas City Massacre shootings, and executed in Missouri's gas chamber on October 7, 1938.

The body of Nash was claimed by his sister, Alice Long, and is buried in Linwood Cemetery in Paragould, Arkansas. His funeral brought many strangers, assumed to be gangsters, to town. Prompted by the massacre, in January 1934, the U.S. Congress passed legislation that allowed FBI agents to be armed and gave them the authority to make arrests.

== See also ==
- Public enemy
