= Pretty Boy Floyd =

American bank robber (1904–1934)

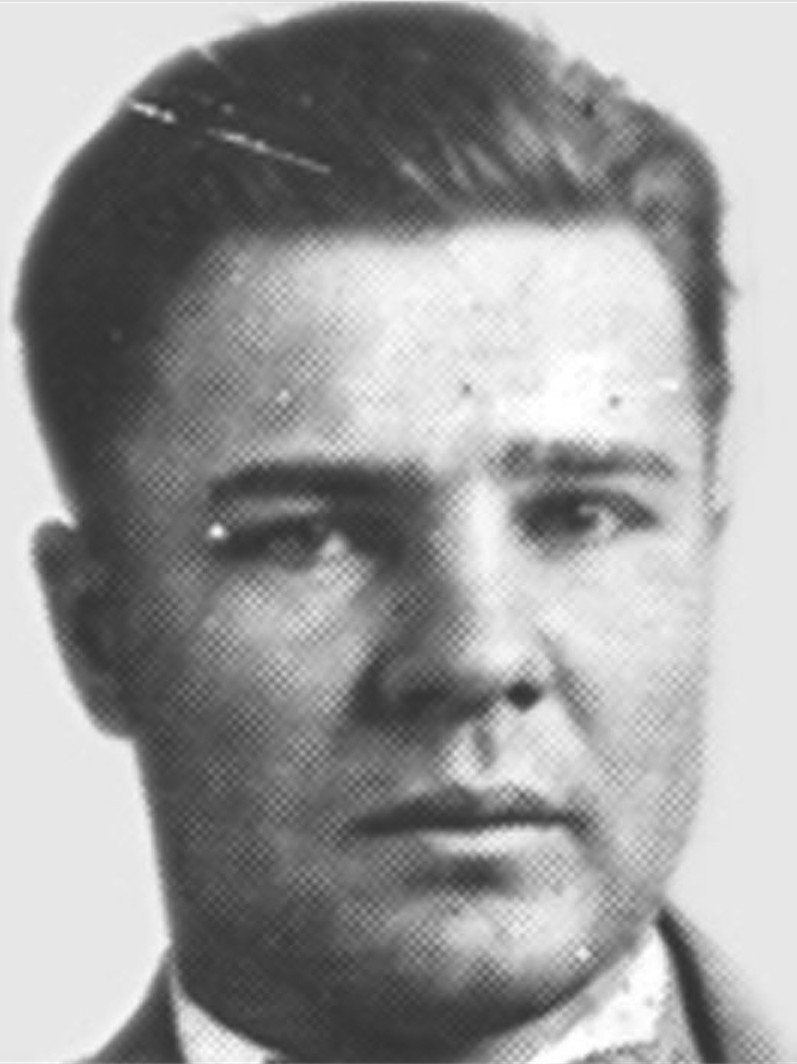
- Floyd's mugshot in 1933
- Born: Charles Arthur Floyd; February 3, 1904; Adairsville, Georgia, U.S.
- Died: October 22, 1934 (aged 30); East Liverpool, Ohio, U.S.
- Cause of death: Gunshot wounds
- Occupations: Gangster, bank robber
- Spouse: Ruby Hardgrave (m. 1924; div. 1929)
- Children: 1
- Penalty: 15 years imprisonment (escaped)

Charles Arthur Floyd (February 3, 1904 – October 22, 1934), nicknamed Pretty Boy Floyd, was an American bank robber whose crimes across the Midwestern and South Central United States received widespread press coverage in the 1930s. Floyd developed a positive reputation among some members of the public, in part because he reportedly destroyed mortgage documents during robberies, allegedly relieving debtors of their obligations.

Floyd was ultimately tracked down and killed by officers from the Bureau of Investigation in a raid led by Melvin Purvis. Contemporary accounts also place local officers Robert "Pete" Pyle and George Curran at both the shooting and Floyd's subsequent embalming. Floyd has continued to be a familiar figure in American popular culture, sometimes seen as notorious criminal, a tragic product of the Great Depression, or an antiheroic outlaw figure.

== Early life ==
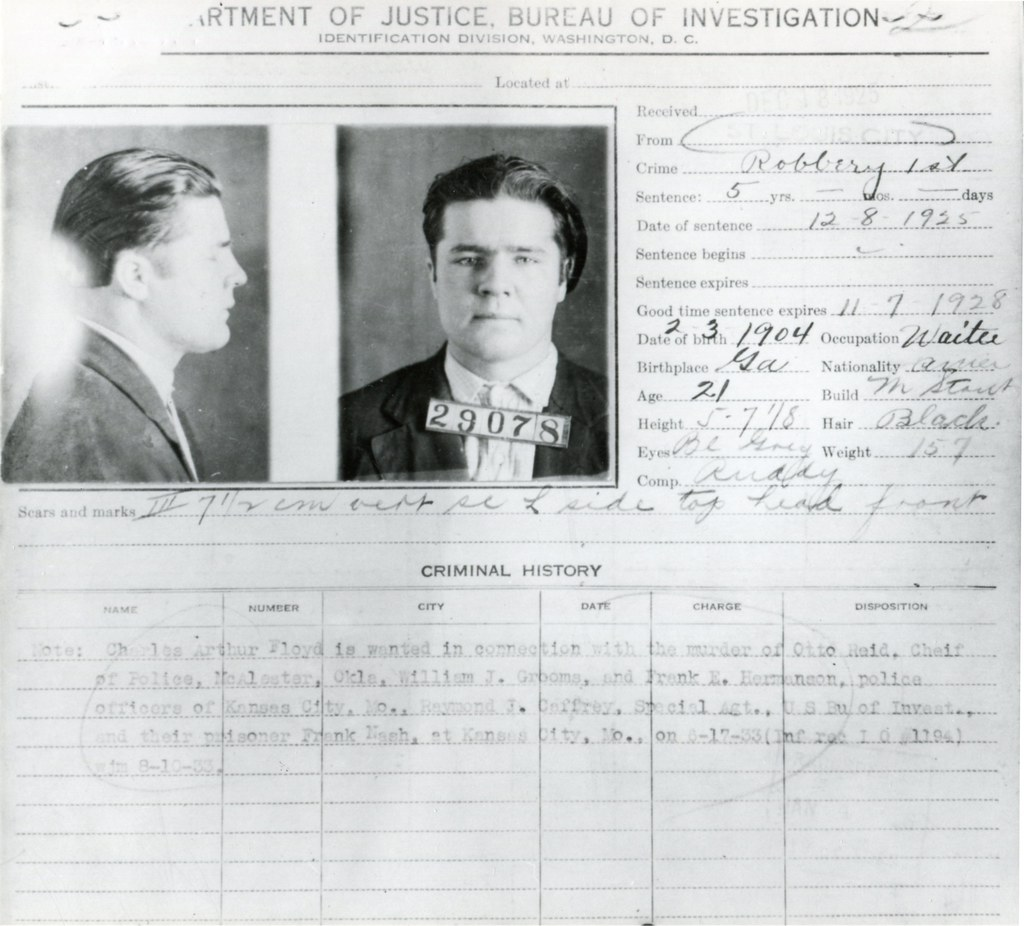
Floyd's 1928 prison record

Floyd was born in Adairsville, Georgia, in 1904 to Walter Lee Floyd and Mamie Helene (née Echols). His family moved to Akins, Oklahoma, in 1911, and he grew up there. He was arrested at age 18 after he stole $3.50 (adjusted for inflation it would be $67.32 in 2025) from a local post office. Three years later, he was arrested for a payroll robbery on September 16, 1925, in St. Louis, Missouri, and was sentenced to five years in prison. He served three and a half years before being granted parole.

Floyd entered into partnerships with criminals in the Kansas City underworld after his parole. He committed a series of bank robberies over the next several years, and it was during this period that he acquired the nickname "Pretty Boy", although accounts differ. In one account, Orville Drake gave him the name because he would wear a white button-up dress shirt and slacks to work in the oil fields. The men on the rig began calling him "Pretty Boy" which was later turned into "Pretty Boy Floyd". In another account, the payroll master in the 1925 St. Louis Kroger office holdup described one of the robbers as "a pretty boy with apple cheeks". Floyd despised the nickname.

In 1929, Floyd was wanted in numerous cases. On March 9, he was arrested in Kansas City on investigation, and again on May 7 for vagrancy and suspicion of highway robbery, but he was released the next day. Two days later, he was arrested in Pueblo, Colorado, and charged with vagrancy. He was fined $50.00 ($937.5 in 2025) and sentenced to 60 days in jail.

Floyd was arrested in Akron, Ohio, under the alias Frank Mitchell, on March 8, 1930, and charged with the murder of an Akron police officer who had been killed during a robbery that evening. He was arrested in Toledo, Ohio, for bank robbery and murder on May 20. He was convicted of a Sylvania, Ohio, bank robbery and sentenced on November 24, 1930, to 12 to 15 years in Ohio State penitentiary, but he escaped.

Floyd was a suspect in the deaths of Kansas City brothers Wally and Boll Ash, who were rum-runners found dead in a burning car on March 25, 1931. Members of his gang killed Patrolman R. H. Castner of Bowling Green, Ohio, on April 23. On July 22, Floyd killed federal agent Curtis C. Burke in Kansas City, Missouri.

Former sheriff Erv Kelley of McIntosh County, Oklahoma, was shot by Floyd while trying to arrest him on April 7, 1932. In November, three members of Floyd's gang attempted to rob the Farmers and Merchants Bank in Boley, Oklahoma.

Despite his life of crime, Floyd was viewed positively by the general public. When he robbed banks, he allegedly destroyed mortgage documents, but this has never been confirmed and may be myth. One of four elements of the "outlaw-hero" American folktype is that the person "steals from the rich and gives to the poor"; Floyd is one example of a historical person who has become an outlaw-hero with this element in folklore. Floyd was often protected by locals of Oklahoma who referred to him as "Robin Hood of the Cookson Hills".

== Kansas City massacre ==
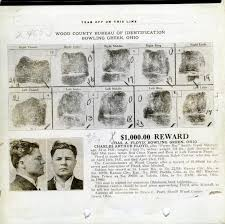
Ohio reward poster for Floyd

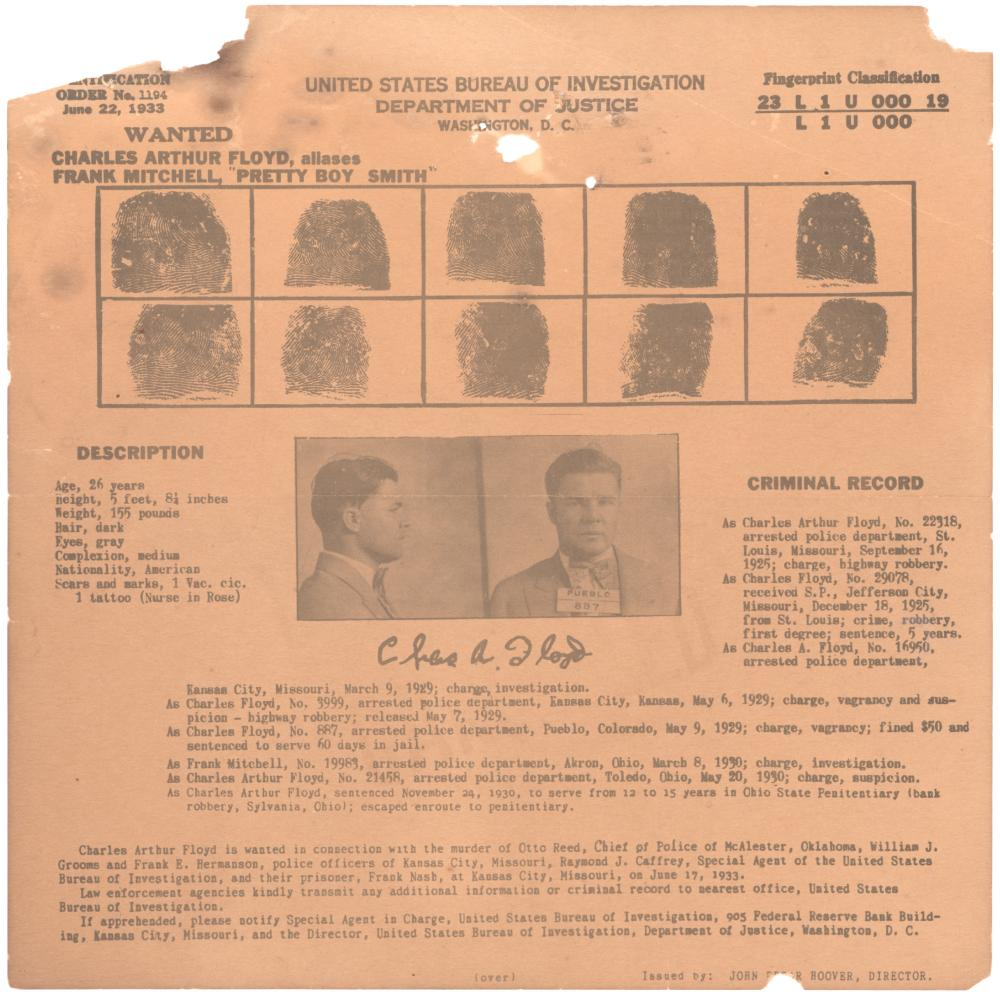
FCI wanted poster for Floyd

Floyd and Adam Richetti became the primary suspects in a gunfight known as the "Kansas City massacre" on June 17, 1933, which resulted in the deaths of four law enforcement officers. J. Edgar Hoover leveraged the incident to seek more authority to pursue Floyd, although historians are divided as to whether Floyd was involved. The gunfight was an attack by Vernon Miller and accomplices on lawmen escorting robber Frank "Jelly" Nash to a car parked at the Union Station in Kansas City, Missouri. Kansas City detectives William Grooms and Frank Hermanson, Oklahoma police chief Otto Reed, and special agent Ray Caffrey were killed. Nash was also killed while sitting in the car, shot in the head by his would-be rescuers. Two other Kansas City police officers survived by slumping forward in the back seat and feigning death. As the gunmen inspected the car, another officer responded from the station and fired at them, forcing them to flee. Miller was found dead on November 27, 1933, outside Detroit, Michigan, having been beaten and strangled.

Floyd and Richetti were allegedly Miller's accomplices. Evidence against them included their presence in Kansas City at the time, eyewitness identifications (although these have been contested), Richetti's fingerprint recovered from a beer bottle at Miller's hideout, an underworld account naming Floyd and Richetti as the gunmen, and Hoover's firm advocacy of their guilt. Fellow bank robber Alvin Karpis claimed that Floyd confessed involvement. However the bandit alleged to have been Floyd was reported to have been wounded by a gunshot to the shoulder in the attack, and Floyd's body showed no sign of this injury when examined later. The underworld account identifying Floyd and Richetti as the killers was offset by equally unreliable underworld accounts proclaiming their innocence. The Floyd family has maintained that Floyd admitted to many other crimes, but vehemently denied involvement in this one, as did Richetti.

Kansas City police received a postcard dated June 30, 1933, from Springfield, Missouri, that read: "Dear Sirs – I – Charles Floyd – want it made known that I did not participate in the massacre of officers at Kansas City. Charles Floyd". The police department believed the note to be genuine. Floyd also reportedly denied involvement in the massacre to the agents who had fatally wounded him. In addition, a 2002 book on the massacre attributes at least some of the killing to friendly fire by a lawman who was unfamiliar with his weapon, based on ballistic tests.

== Death ==
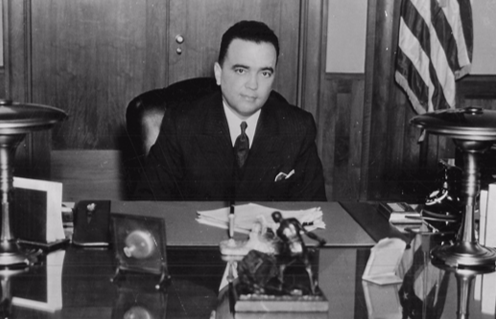
J. Edgar Hoover, who declared Floyd to be "public enemy number one"

J. Edgar Hoover, director of the BOI, named Floyd "Public Enemy No. 1" following the death of John Dillinger. Local police and F.B.I. agents led by Melvin Purvis under the direct supervision of Inspector Samuel P. Cowley shot Floyd on October 22, 1934, in a corn field in East Liverpool, Ohio. Accounts differ on who shot him and the manner in which he died.

Floyd and Richetti had left Buffalo, New York, on October 18, and their vehicle slid into a telephone pole in heavy fog at 3 am the following morning. No one was injured, but the car was disabled, so they sent two female companions to get a tow truck. They planned to have the women accompany the tow truck driver into town and have the vehicle repaired while they waited by the roadside.

After dawn on October 19, motorist Joe Fryman and his son-in-law David O'Hanlon passed by, observing two men dressed in suits lying by the roadside. They thought it suspicious and informed Wellsville, Ohio, police chief John H. Fultz. Fultz investigated with officers Grover Potts and William Erwin. Richetti saw the lawmen and fled into the woods, pursued by two officers, while Fultz went towards Floyd. Floyd immediately drew his gun and fired. During the ensuing gunfight, Fultz was wounded in the foot and Potts was wounded in the right shoulder. Floyd fled into the forest. After enlisting the help of another local police officer, Chester C. Smith (February 14, 1895 – October 23, 1984), who had served as a sniper during World War I, the group of lawmen resumed the pursuit and successfully apprehended Richetti, but Floyd remained on the run. News of the search quickly spread. Local police in the surrounding areas were mobilized, and a team of BOI agents was quickly dispatched.

On October 22, Floyd was able to hitch a ride to East Liverpool, Ohio, where he obtained food at a pool hall owned by his friend Charles Joy. Differing accounts of the events that followed were given by responding BOI agents, local law enforcement officers, and nearby civilians. All agree that Floyd was confronted by a group of lawmen soon after leaving the pool hall, and attempted to flee on foot. Soon after he was shot and wounded by pursuing officers, who then arrested Floyd and formally placed him in federal custody. Accounts differ about which officers fired at Floyd, how many times they fired, and in what sequence.

According to Special Agent Winfred E. Hopton, BOI agents alone participated in the final confrontation with Floyd, and local law enforcement arrived later. BOI accounts state that four of their agents: Hopton, Samuel K. McKee Jr., and David E. Hall, led by Purvis, and four members of the East Liverpool Police Department: Herman H. Roth Jr., Chester C. Smith, and Glenn G. Montgomery, led by Chief Hugh J. McDermott, were searching the area south of Clarkson, Ohio, in two cars. They saw a car move from behind a corn crib and then move back. Floyd then emerged from the car and drew a .45 caliber pistol, and the BOI agents opened fire. Floyd reportedly said, "I'm done for. You've hit me twice."

Contradicting this, a news report from the time states that Floyd crawled out of the corn crib toward the Dyke automobile, then changed direction toward a wooded ridge. Purvis yelled "Halt!" but Floyd ran. Purvis called out "Fire!" and Floyd was mortally wounded by four bullets. Handcuffs were placed on his wrists. Floyd asked, "Who the hell tipped you?" Floyd refused to answer Purvis's questions about the Kansas City Massacre, but did say, "I am Floyd…where is Eddie?" referring to Adam Richetti. Thinking he had been shot twice, he remarked, "You got me twice." Purvis did not disclose Floyd's last words. Allegedly four days before, Floyd and two accomplices had robbed a bank of $500 ($12033.58 in 2025). Floyd's share of his last bank robbery was $120 ($2888.06 in 2025). Among Floyd's effects found on him was a watch and a fob. Each had ten notches, allegedly for ten persons Floyd had killed.

Retired East Liverpool police captain Chester Smith described events differently in a 1979 issue of Time magazine. He was credited with shooting Floyd first, and he stated that he had deliberately wounded Floyd but not killed him. "I knew Purvis couldn't hit him, so I dropped him with two shots from my .32 Winchester rifle." According to Smith's account, Floyd fell and did not regain his footing, and Smith then disarmed him. At that point, Purvis ran up and ordered, "Back away from that man. I want to talk to him." Purvis questioned Floyd briefly and received curses in reply, so he ordered agent Herman Hollis to "fire into him." Hollis then shot Floyd at point-blank range with a sub-machine gun, killing him. The interviewer asked if there was a cover-up by the FBI, and Smith responded: "Sure was, because they didn't want it to get out that he'd been killed that way."

FBI agent Winfred E. Hopton disputed Smith's claim in a letter to the editors of Time, published in the November 19, 1979, issue. He stated that he was one of four BOI agents present when Floyd was killed on a farm several miles from East Liverpool. According to Hopton, members of the East Liverpool police department arrived only after Floyd was already mortally wounded. He also claimed that, when the four agents confronted Floyd, he turned to fire on them, and two of the four killed him almost instantly. Smith's account said that Herman Hollis shot the wounded Floyd on Purvis's order, but Hopton claimed that Hollis was not even present. At least one other source discredits Smith's version, stating that although Smith's story received wide currency, Hollis was not at the orchard that afternoon. Hollis' FBI profile does not mention his participation in this incident. Hopton also stated that Floyd's body was transported back to East Liverpool in Hopton's own car. In an October 29 memo, Hoover instructed his assistant, Edward Allan Tamm, to send Floyd's personal effects to Floyd's mother after photographing his watch to record the ten notches carved into it which Hoover speculated were for men Floyd had killed. Floyd had three wounds-one in the right forearm and two in the lower torso.

Floyd's body was embalmed and briefly viewed at the Sturgis Funeral Home in East Liverpool, Ohio, before being sent on to Oklahoma. His body was placed on public display in Sallisaw, Oklahoma. His funeral was attended by between 20,000 and 40,000 people and remains the largest funeral in Oklahoma history. He was buried in Akins, Oklahoma.

== Popular portrayals ==
Video clips of Depression era gangsters, including Pretty Boy Floyd, Baby Face Nelson and Machine Gun Kelly

Woody Guthrie wrote a protest song romanticizing Floyd's life in 1939 called "Pretty Boy Floyd" which recounted Floyd's supposed generosity to the poor. It compared foreclosing bankers to outlaws, calling both actions robbery. Guthrie's song has been subsequently covered by many recording artists, including the Byrds, in their seminal 1968 country-rock album, Sweetheart of the Rodeo.

The hip-hop song 'The Message' by Grandmaster Flash and the Furious Five contains the lyric: "Now you're unemployed, all null and void, Walking round like you're Pretty Boy Floyd, Turned stick-up kid, but look what you done did, Got sent up for a eight-year bid."

Dick Tracy's adversary Flattop Jones was based on Pretty Boy Floyd. Flattop claims to be a freelancer from the "Crookston Hills", a parody of Cookson Hills in Oklahoma, and the comic strip refers to Flattop's involvement in the Kansas City Massacre.

Several films have been made about Floyd:

- John Ericson portrayed him in Pretty Boy Floyd (1960), directed by Herbert J. Leder
- Fabian Forte portrayed him in A Bullet for Pretty Boy (1970)
- Steve Kanaly portrayed him in the Film Dillinger (1973)
- Martin Sheen portrayed him in the TV movie The Story of Pretty Boy Floyd (1974)
- Bo Hopkins portrayed him in the TV movie The Kansas City Massacre (1975)
- Andrew Robinson portrayed him in the film The Verne Miller Story (1987) starring Scott Glenn as Vernon Miller
- Channing Tatum portrayed him in Public Enemies (2009) starring Christian Bale and Johnny Depp, in which he is erroneously depicted as being killed before John Dillinger

== Floyd in literature ==
Pretty Boy, by William Cunningham, originally published by Vanguard in 1936, was republished by Mongrel Empire Press, Norman, Oklahoma, in 2014. There is an informative introduction by James Murray. This novel is a combination of fiction and propaganda, but much of it is consistent with historical data. The propaganda is interwoven as an essential plot element, namely, the legend of Robin Hood. And it is consistent with other depictions of Pretty Boy Floyd in contemporary works, namely, John Steinbeck's The Grapes of Wrath (1939), and Woody Guthrie's ballad, "Pretty Boy Floyd" (1939).

Pretty Boy Floyd (1995) is a fictionalized account of Floyd's life by Larry McMurtry and Diana Ossana.

In John Steinbeck's 1939 novel The Grapes of Wrath, the character Ma Joad refers several times to Pretty Boy Floyd as a young man driven to a tragic fate by social injustice and the Great Depression:

I knowed Purty Boy Floyd. I knowed his ma. They was good folks. He was full a hell, sure, like a good boy oughta be…He done a bad thing an' they hurt 'im, caught 'im an' hurt him so he was mad, an' the nex' bad thing he done was mad, an' they hurt 'im again. An' purty soon he was mean-mad. They shot at him like a varmint an' he shot back, an' then they run him like a coyote, an' him a-snappin' an' a-snarlin', mean as a lobo. An' he was mad. He wasn't a boy or a man no more, he was just a walkin' chunk of mean-mad. But the folks that knowed him didn' hurt 'im. He wasn' mad at them. Finally they run him down and killed 'im. No matter what they say it in the paper how he was bad – that's how it was.

Floyd is (along with Baby Face Nelson and Machine Gun Kelly) one of the main characters of the comic book series Pretty, Baby, Machine.

== See also ==
- George Birdwell
- List of Depression-era outlaws
