= Harvey Bailey =

American criminal

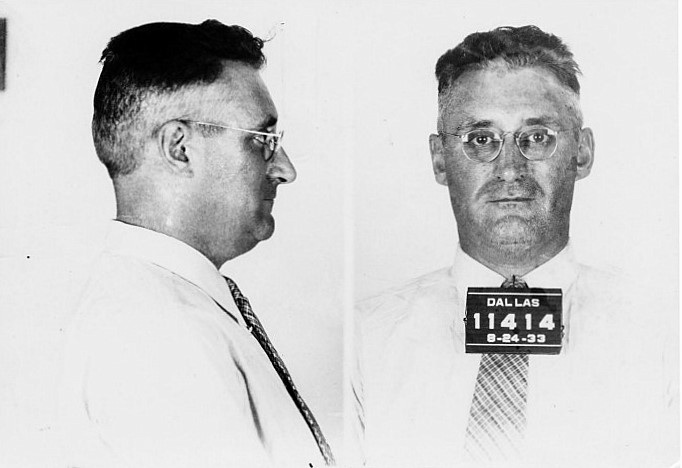
- Harvey Bailey's mugshot, Dallas 1933
- Born: Harvey John Bailey; August 23, 1887; West Virginia, United States
- Died: March 1, 1979 (aged 91); Joplin, Missouri, United States
- Other name: The Dean of American Bank Robbers
- Known for: One of the most successful bank robbers during the 1920s.
- Spouse: Esther Farmer

Harvey John Bailey (August 23, 1887 – March 1, 1979), called "The Dean of American Bank Robbers", was an American criminal who spanned a long career and was one of the most successful bank robbers during the 1920s, walking off with over $1 million.

== His career ==
Born in West Virginia, Bailey robbed his first bank in Northwestern, North Dakota, c. 1921 and his last in Kingfisher, Oklahoma, on September 9, 1933. He was incarcerated in Dallas on July 8, 1932, until he escaped on June 1, 1933, during a breakout in which the warden was kidnapped and used as a human shield. He was recaptured and found guilty of complicity in the Urschel kidnapping and was sentenced to life in prison on October 7, 1933.

According to Jay Nash, Bailey was holed up in a separate part of the ranch where Machine Gun Kelly was holding kidnap victim Charles F. Urschel, unaware of the kidnapping and unable to travel because of a bullet wound in the leg sustained during his prison escape.

As the Kelly gang was preparing to pull up stakes, one of the minor players in the gang visited Bailey and peeled off some bills from his ransom and gave them to Bailey for doctor bills.

The marked ransom money was found on Bailey when he was arrested, and he received extra years on his sentence as an "accomplice" in a kidnapping which ironically he had no part of.

Originally sent to Leavenworth, he was transferred to Alcatraz on September 1, 1934. He was returned to Leavenworth in 1946 and transferred in 1960 to Seagoville Federal Correctional Institution in Texas, where he remained until he was released on March 30, 1964.

One of the many possible suspects listed as one of the four assassins in the Saint Valentine's Day Massacre is Fred "Killer" Burke. In his 1973 autobiography, however, Bailey insisted that he and Burke were planning a bank robbery together in Calumet City, Illinois, about 20 miles south of the massacre site, at the time the massacre took place. In 1966, Bailey married the widow of Herbert Allen "Deafy" Farmer and found work as a woodworker in a furniture factory. Esther Farmer Bailey died in 1981.

Bailey died peacefully in Joplin, Missouri, on March 1, 1979, at the age of 91.

== See also ==
- List of Depression-era outlaws
