= September 1926 =

Month of 1926

<<	September 1926					>>
Su	Mo	Tu	We	Th	Fr	Sa
			1	2	3	4
5	6	7	8	9	10	11
12	13	14	15	16	17	18
19	20	21	22	23	24	25
26	27	28	29	30

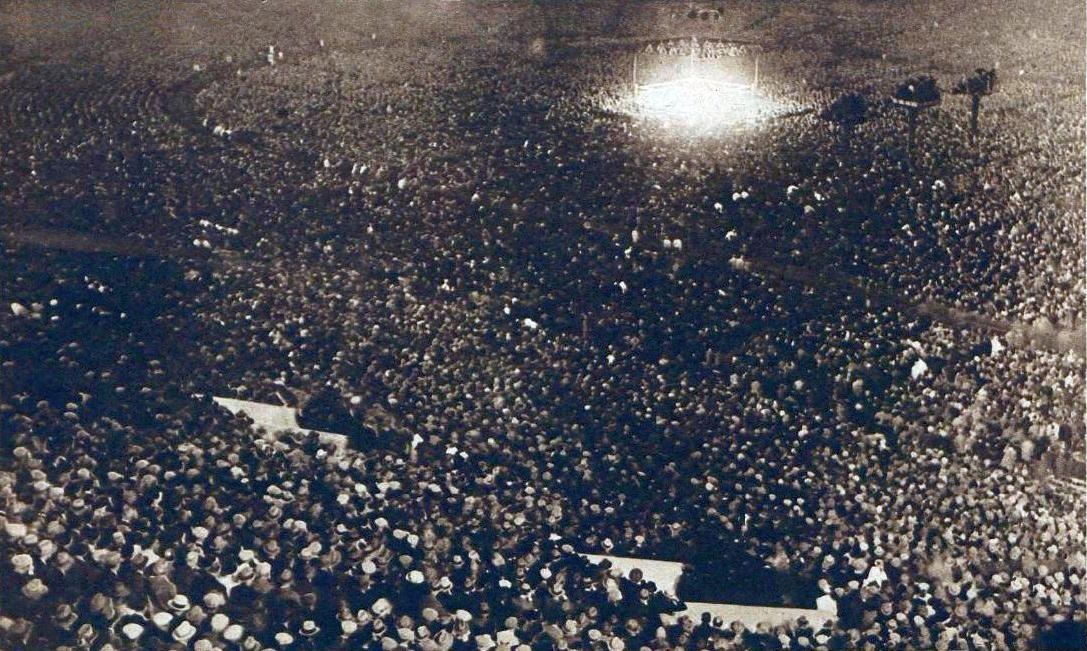
September 23, 1926: Crowd of 120,557 boxing fans pay to see the Dempsey vs. Tunney heavyweight bout at Philadelphia

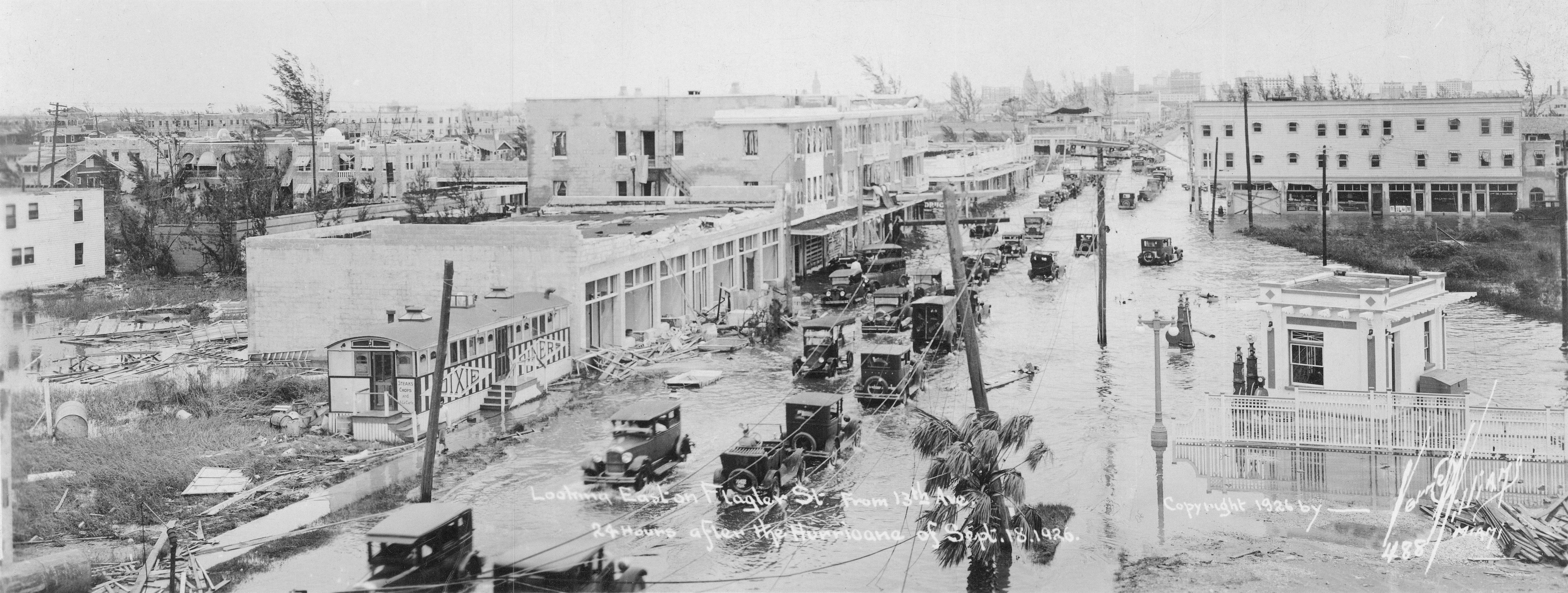
September 18, 1926: Category 4 Hurricane strikes Miami and kills 372 people.

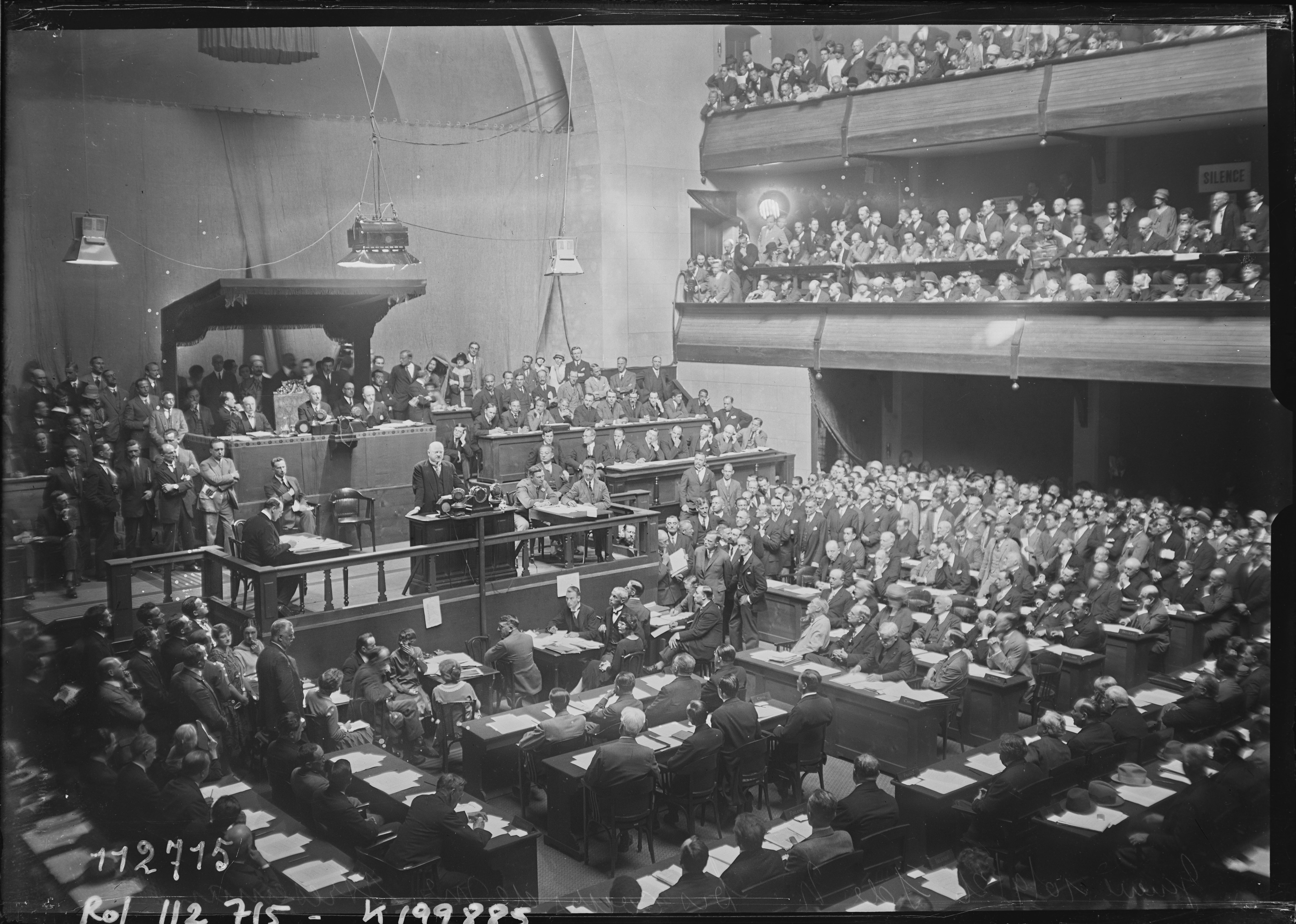
German Foreign Minister Stresemann speaks to the League of Nations as Germany is admitted to the League and its Council

The following events occurred in September 1926:

== September 1, 1926 (Wednesday) ==
- In Spain, 100 people were killed in flooding from storms that followed a 55-day drought.
- Northwest Airlines, which would merge with Delta Air Lines in 2010, was founded as Northwest Airways by Colonel Lewis Brittin in the U.S. city of Minneapolis, to begin operations on October 1 as a mail carrier.
- The standoff continued in Wanhsien as the gunboat Widgeon arrived carrying the British Consul from Chongqing in response to HMS Cockchafer's call of the previous day.

== September 2, 1926 (Thursday) ==
- Representatives of the Kingdom of Italy and the Mutawakkilite Kingdom of Yemen (led by the Imam Yahya Muhammad Hamid ed-Din) signed the Treaty of San'a, with Italy becoming the first nation to grant recognition to Yahya ed-Din's government.
- In the Sichuan province of China, 20,000 troops under the command of General Yang Sen assembled with artillery along the shoreline of Wanzhou.
- The funeral train of Rudolph Valentino left New York on a cross-country journey to his final resting place in California.
- Born: Ibrahim Nasir, Prime Minister of the Maldives from 1957 to 1968, and President from 1968 to 1978; in Fuvahmulah (d. 2008)

== September 3, 1926 (Friday) ==
- Brazil's President Artur Bernardes obtained a revision of the nation's constitution in order to prohibit judicial review of the ongoing state of emergency in most of Brazil's states.
- The 146.7 metres (481 ft) tall Funkturm Berlin radio tower was inaugurated at the 3rd Große Deutsche Funkausstellung (3rd Great German Radio Exhibition).
- Rudolph Valentino's funeral train pulled into LaSalle Street Station in Chicago. A heavy police presence was on hand to keep order, but some grieving fans got past the police cordon and ran out onto the tracks. Only a few invitees were allowed into the train.
- The first issue of The Canberra Times newspaper was published in Australia, as launched by publishers Thomas Shakespeare and Arthur Shakespeare.
- The British Governor of Hong Kong, Sir Cecil Clementi, on instructions from Leo Amery, the Secretary of State for the Colonies, changed the official spelling of the name of the colony from "Hongkong" to "Hong Kong".
- Born:
  - Uttam Kumar, Indian Bengali film actor, filmmaker and musician; as Arun Kumar Chattopadhyay in Calcutta, Bengal Province, British India (d. 1980)
  - Alison Lurie, American novelist and Pulitzer Prize winner for the novel Foreign Affairs; in Chicago (d. 2020)

== September 4, 1926 (Saturday) ==
- The 15 members of the League of Nations Council unanimously accepted a resolution to admit Germany to the League with a permanent seat alongside the other four permanent members (the UK, France, Italy and Japan). Spain turned down a semi-permanent council seat at the League of Nations, because it had not been granted a permanent seat.
- In the Northern Expedition in the Republic of China (1912–1949), General Chiang Kai-shek led his National Revolutionary Army in an invasion of the Jiangxi province, controlled by warlord Sun Chuanfang, crossing the border from the Hunan province. By September 19, his troops controlled Jiangxi's cities Jiujiang and Nanchang.
- In a referendum in the Commonwealth of Australia, voters rejected two proposals to alter the nation's constitution. The "Industry and Commerce" amendment would have extended the power of Australia's parliament in order to enact national anti-trust laws applying to domestic corporations, a power already held over foreign companies. The "Essential Services" amendment would give the parliament the power of "protecting the interests of the public in case of actual or probable interruption of any deemed essential services," including prohibiting strikes and lockouts from interrupting hospital, police, firefighting, and supply of food, electricity or water. Defeat was overwhelming, with 57.2% opposing the Essential Services amendment, and 56.5% rejecting the Industry and Commerce amendment.
- Born:
  - Elias Hrawi, President of Lebanon from 1989 to 1998 (d. 2006)
  - Yevgeni Nikolayevich Andreyev, Soviet Air Force colonel and balloonist who set the record for longest free-fall parachute jump (80,400 feet (24,500 m); in Novosibirsk, Russia SFSR (d. 2000)
  - Dennis Murphy, American sports entrepreneur known for co-founding the original World TeamTennis (1973–1978)the American Basketball Association (1967–1976), the World Hockey Association (1972–1979) and Roller Hockey International (1992–1999); to American parents in Shanghai in China (d. 2021)
  - Ivan Illich, Austrian priest, social critic and author known for the books Deschooling Society (1971) and Limits to Medicine (1975, subtitled "Medical Nemesis: The Expropriation of Health"); in Vienna (d. 2002)
  - Donald Petersen, Chief Executive Officer of the Ford Motor Company from 1985 to 1990; in Pipestone, Minnesota (d. 2024)
  - Jorge Salvador Lara, Foreign Minister of Ecuador 1966, and 1976 to 1977; in Quito(d.2012)
  - Bert Olmstead, Canadian NHL ice hockey left wing nicknamed "Dirty Bertie" for his physical playing style, inductee to the Hockey Hall of Fame; in Sceptre, Saskatchewan (d. 2015)
- Died: Mercedes Valdés Cuevas, 83, Chilean philanthropist and First Lady of Chile, as wife of President Ramón Barros Luco from 1910 to 1915

== September 5, 1926 (Sunday) ==
- A camouflaged and armored merchant ship, SS Kiawo, sailed into the port city of Wanxian in Sichuan province, carrying a large group of Royal Navy sailors and Marines, and, with the gunboats HMS Widgeon and Cockchafer, opened fire on Chinese troops. In the battle that followed, hostages from the ships Wahnsien and Wantung escaped and the Royal Navy ships began bombardment of Wanxian, destroying more than 1,000 buildings, and killing 250 Chinese soldiers and 100 civilians. The British sustained the loss of seven sailors and a merchant sailor.
- A fire killed 48 people in the Irish town of Dromcolliher when a candle ignited a reel of nitrate film stock while a crowd was watching a movie. In addition to people who were killed while running for an exit, others were killed when the timber barn housing the cinema quickly burned.
- A train wreck killed 28 people in the U.S. near the town of Granite, Colorado when the Denver and Rio Grande Western Railroad passenger train No. 2 derailed while taking a sharp curve at high speed.
- In Spain, the officers of the Artillery Corps staged a collective protest by shutting themselves within their barracks. They were angry about the system that promoted officers by election rather than seniority. King Alfonso XIII declared martial law throughout the country and the officers were swiftly arrested.

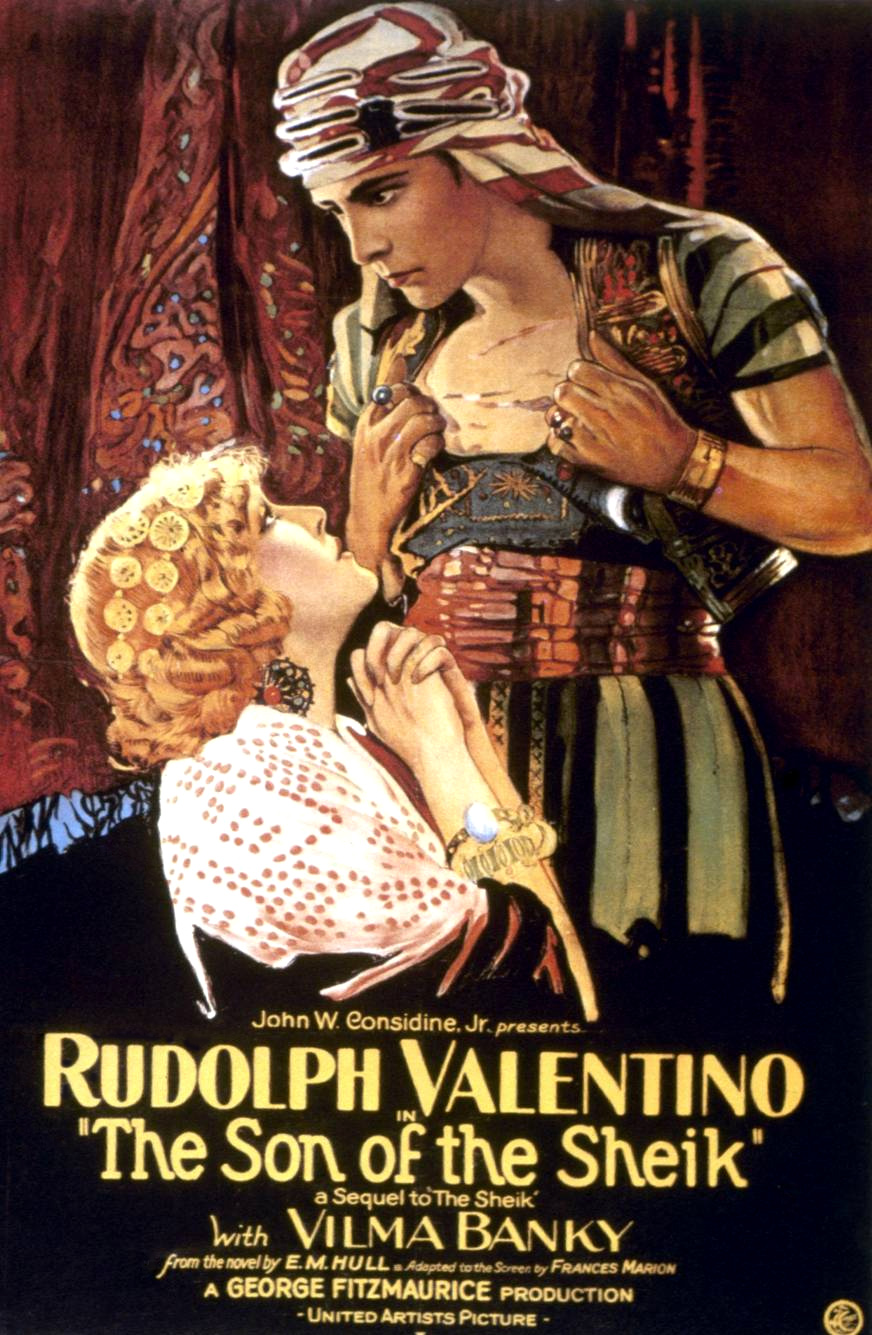
Valentino's final film

- Rudolph Valentino's final film, The Son of the Sheik went into general release throughout the United States. It had premiered in Los Angeles on July 9 and been shown in L.A. for four weeks, and was followed by releases to first run cinemas in other major U.S. cities in conjunction with a tour by Valentino, his death on August 23 prompted a high demand for the United Artists film.
- Born:
  - Prince Mishaal bin Abdulaziz Al Saud, 13th son of Saudi Arabian King Ibn Saud and government official who was chairman of the Allegiance Council (2007 to 2017) to determine the heir to the Saudi throne and the Saudi Minister of Defense from 1951 to 1953; in Riyadh (d. 2017)
  - Carmen Petra Basacopol, Romanian composer; in Sibiu (d. 2023)
- Died:
  - George W. Lewis, 87, English entomologist specializing in classifying species of beetles (Coleoptera), including more than 750 which he discovered. Six species are named in his honor, including Heteraspis levisii.
  - Martin van Maële, 62, French illustrator

== September 6, 1926 (Monday) ==
- In China's Northern Expedition, the Kuomintang and the National Revolutionary Army of Chiang Kai-shek captured the port of Hankou in the Hubei province.
- Rudolph Valentino's funeral train arrived in Los Angeles. More than 3,000 onlookers filled the streets to watch the procession of the hearse to the Guardian Angel mortuary chapel.
- Born:
  - Claus van Amsberg, German-born Prince consort of the Netherlands from 1980 to 2002 as the husband of Queen Beatrix, as well as having been a diplomat for West Germany; at Hitzacker, Province of Hanover, Weimar Republic of Germany (d. 2002)
  - Alan L. Mackay, British structural chemist in the field of crystallography; in Wolverhampton, Staffordshire, England (d.2025)
  - Prabodh Kumar Bhowmick, Indian anthropologist; in Ahmedabad, Bombay Presidency, British India (now in Gujarat state) (d.2003)
  - Maurice Cowling, British historian; in London (d. 2005)
  - William J. Flynn, American businessman who served as CEO of the Mutual of America Life Insurance Company, as well as an activist for peace in Northern Ireland; in Manhattan, New York City (d. 2018)

== September 7, 1926 (Tuesday) ==
- In Raymondville, Texas, five prisoners were shot and killed after being taken by a group of five county Willacy County officers who said that the prisoners had "proffered to lead them to an arms cache" used in the shooting. The five persons killed had been held on suspicion of the September 5 murder of Willacy County peace officers Lee Shaw and Ernest May. Dead in the shooting were the "Nunez boys" (Tomas Nunez and his sons Jose and Delancio) were, and Chico Gonzalez, all Hispanic Americans, died along with Matt Zailer, an Austrian immigrant, died together, while the five law enforcement officers were uninjured. Each of the officers gave sworn statements that the group of prisoners and officers "were fired upon by a party in ambush" and all the prisoners "were killed in the battle that ensued". There were no other witnesses. A grand jury investigated the incident and returned no charges against the accused officers
- Mercyhurst University, a private Roman Catholic university, opened in Erie, Pennsylvania for its first classes, operating under the name Mercyhurst Seminary.
- A second funeral Mass for Rudolph Valentino was held at the Catholic Church of the Good Shepherd in Beverly Hills, and then he was interred at the Hollywood Memorial Park Cemetery (now the Hollywood Forever cemetery) in Hollywood. Charlie Chaplin, George Fitzmaurice and Samuel Goldwyn (whose son was born the same day) were among the pallbearers.
- Born:
  - Dr. Donald Pinkel, pioneering American oncologist and the first CEO of St. Jude Children's Research Hospital, from 1962 to 1974, and head of a team of physicians who focused on total therapy and increasing the cure rate for acute lymphoblastic leukemia in children; in Buffalo, New York (d. 2022)
  - Don Messick, American voice actor for Hanna-Barbera, best known for being the voice of "Scooby-Doo" for 27 years, as "Dr. Benton Quest" on the Jonny Quest (TV series); in Buffalo, New York (d. 1997)
  - Samuel Goldwyn Jr., American film producer; in Los Angeles (d.2015)

== September 8, 1926 (Wednesday) ==
- The Assembly of the League of Nations voted unanimously at noon to admit Germany to the League and to grant it a permanent seat on the League Council, in return for Germany's promise under the Locarno Treaty to never go to war again.
- The freighter SS Haleakala, carrying a crew of 38 people and a cargo of coal and lumber, transmitted its final message while sailing from Hampton Roads in the U.S., bound for Montevideo in Uruguay. It was never heard from again after its captain noted that his position was at the coordinates 26°N 63°W, about 1,050 miles (1,690 km) east of the U.S. city of Miami.
- Pope Pius XI issued a public condemnation of the Action française movement, prohibiting Roman Catholics from joining the movement, or reading its publications.
- Born:
  - Bhupen Hazarika, Indian songwriter and filmmaker; in Sadiya, Assam Province, British India (d. 2011)
  - Sergio Pininfarina, Italian automobile designer noted for the Ferrari 365 P Berlinetta Speciale; in Turin (d. 2012)
  - Marilyn Jorgenson Reece, American civil engineer and highway interchange designer; in Kenmare, North Dakota (d. 2004)

== September 9, 1926 (Thursday) ==
- Regular radio broadcasting began in Finland as the Suomen Yleisradio of Helsinki transmitted its first radio program, with Alexis af Enehjelm announcing news.
- About 1,000 Greek rebels, many still loyal to the deposed Greek dictator Theodoros Pangalos, attacked government troops in Athens. Many civilians were caught in the crossfire as government troops counter-attacked and the revolt was put down.
- Born:
  - Sheikh Yusuf al-Qaradawi, Egyptian-born Qatari Islamic scholar and evangelist, preacher and commentator on the Al Jazeera television program al-Sharī'a wa al-Ḥayāh (Sharia and Life), and founder of the IslamOnline website; in Saft Turab, Gharbia Governorate (d. 2022)

== September 10, 1926 (Friday) ==
- Gustav Stresemann, the Foreign Minister of Germany, led his nation's delegation as Germany took its new seat in the League of Nations at Geneva in Switzerland. Stresemann was welcomed by former French President Aristide Briand. Both Stresemann and Briand would be awarded the Nobel Peace Prize for negotiating the Locarno Treaty that led to Germany's entry to the League in return for its pledge to never go to war again. Stresemann said Germany had begun a policy "to follow a path of subversion of selfish nationalism, to promote international good-will and peace" and in response, Briand said that both nations would try to be "as heroic in peace as they had been in war" during the Great War from 1914 to 1918, and added, "Where, except at the League of Nations, could France and Germany so talk to one another?" A reporter for The New York Times noted "Amid scenes of highest dramatic interest which marked the great historical significance of the event, Germany took her seat in the League of Nations today. It was fitting that Germany should be welcomed by France. What a picture! The Governments of two hereditary enemies who had spilled on many battlefields the blood of millions of each other's best men pledging through their Foreign Ministers before fifty other nations their will and desire to work together for peace and repledging the promises of the Locarno Treaty now coming into effect that never would they fight again."
- Norma Smallwood of Tulsa, Oklahoma, was crowned the sixth Miss America at Atlantic City, New Jersey.A correspondent noted a change in American fashion and commented, "The new American beauty queen exemplifies the movement away from bobbed hair."
- Born:
  - Ladislav Adamec, the last Chairman of the Communist Party of Czechoslovakia, and Prime Minister from 1988 to 1989; in Frenstat, Czechoslovakia (d. 2007)

== September 11, 1926 (Saturday) ==
- Italian anarchist Gino Lucetti, 26, threw a bomb at Benito Mussolini as his limousine passed by the Porta Pia gate in Rome. Eight people were injured, but Mussolini was unhurt and Lucetti, who had brought a loaded revolver to shoot Mussolini if the bomb failed, was quickly captured. Lucetti was sentenced to 30 years in prison, and would serve 17 years until the 1943 liberation of Naples by Allied troops, dying a few months later in the German bombing of Ischia.
- A 3-day event billed inaccurately as a "plebiscite" (plebiscito) by Spain's premier and dictator, General Miguel Primo de Rivera began held across the European Kingdom, with women be allowed to participate in voting for the first time in Spanish history, with the participants being allowed to say whether they endorsed Primo de Rivera's control of government. The regulations that governed the "voting", however, were designed to support only one result, in that the procedure was for eligible citizens to sign registers at designated stations if they supported Primo de Rivera's government and his proposal for an appointed parliament. The only provision in the regulations for opposition was "Abstention from voting will indicate disapproval." Eventually, more than 4.3 million signatures would be counted in favor of Primo de Rivera by his party, the Patriotic Union, in the non-binding referendum.
- The Aloha Tower opened in Honolulu, Hawaii.
- Born:
  - Evgeny Belyaev, Soviet Russian opera tenor and recording artist known as "The Russian Nightingale"; in Klintsy (d. 1994)

== September 12, 1926 (Sunday) ==
- The Russian city of Novonikolayevsk in Siberia, originally named for the Tsar Nicholas II at its founding in 1893, was renamed Novosibirsk by the government of the Russian Soviet Federative Socialist Republic in the Soviet Union.

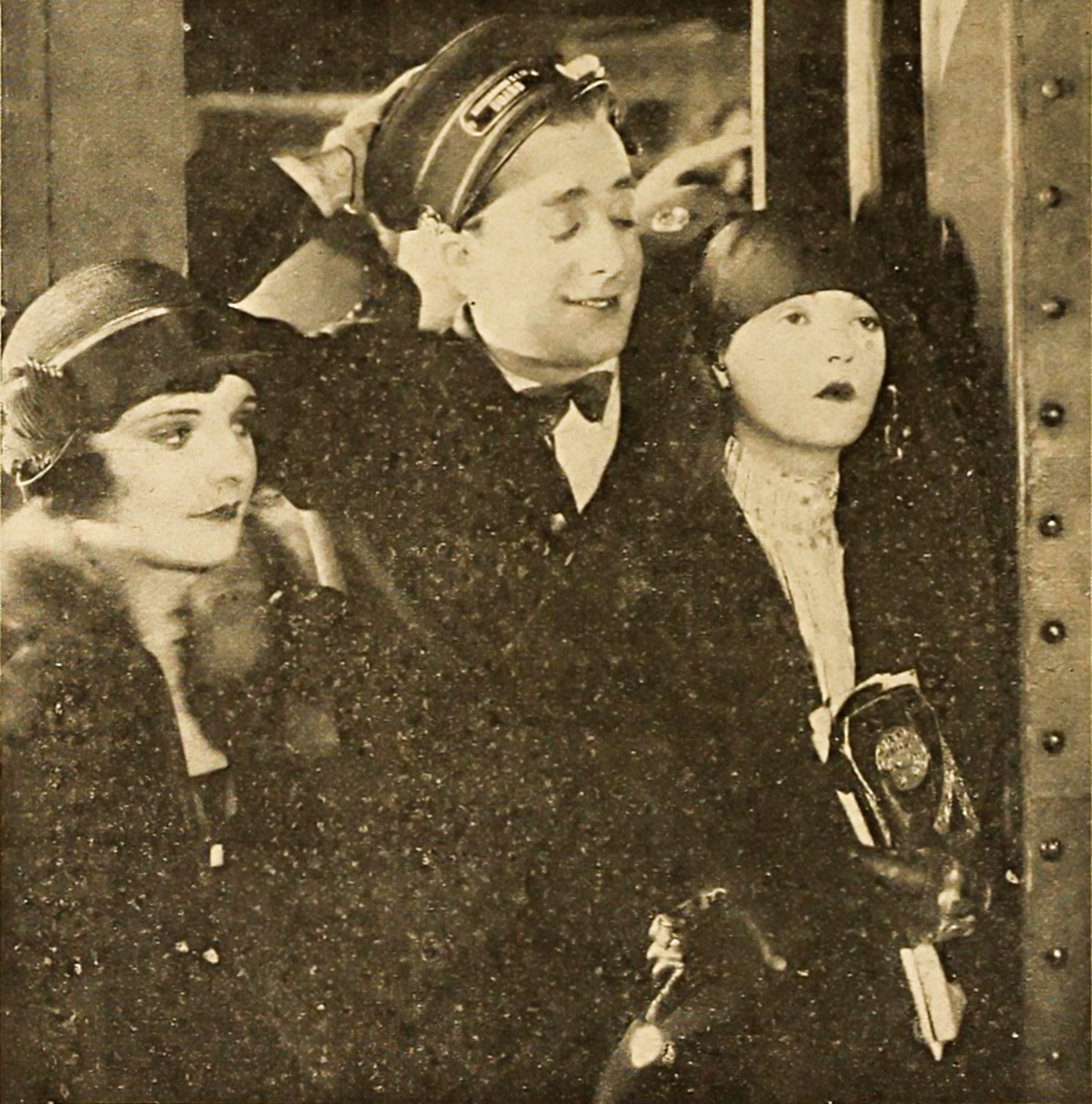
Mackaill (right) and Mulhall (center) in the popular lost film Subway Sadie

- The popular silent comedy romance film Subway Sadie, directed by Alfred Santell and pairing for the first time the team of Dorothy Mackaill (in the title role as Sadie Hermann), with Jack Mulhall as her love interest, was released by First National Pictures, premiering in New York City. Despite its popularity at the time, Subway Sadie was not seen publicly after 1928 and is classified as a "lost film".
- Born:
  - Jun-ichi Nishizawa, Japanese electronics inventor and engineer known for inventing the graded-index fiber in fiber-optic communication technology; in Sendai, Miyagi Prefecture (d. 2018)
  - Paul Janssen, Belgian physician and entrepreneur who founded the Janssen Pharmaceutica company; in Turnhout (d. 2003)
  - Toni Egger, Italian-born Austrian mountaineer known for being (in 1957) the first person to climb the 20,095 feet (6,125 m) mountain Jirishanca in the Andes; in Bolzano, South Tyrol, Kingdom of Italy (killed, 1959, in fall while descending Cerro Torre in Argentina
  - Dix Davis, American child actor who later became a CIA intelligence analyst; in Los Angeles (d. 2024)

== September 13, 1926 (Monday) ==
- The Northern line extension opened on the London Underground; the 27.841 kilometres (17.300 mi) from Morden to East Finchley made it the world's longest rail tunnel, and it remains the longest railway tunnel in the United Kingdom.
- A railway accident killed 26 people and injured 50 others in Australia at Murulla, New South Wales near Murrurundi, when a drawhook broke between two railroad cars on a freight train. The rear 12 cars rolled down a steep hill and into the path of a Great Northern Railway train that was carrying passengers from Moree to Sydney.
- The formation of the National Broadcasting Company (NBC) and the NBC Radio Network was announced in a statement from the Radio Corporation of America (RCA), by the corporation's chairman of the board Owen D. Young and its president, James G. Harbord. Large display advertisements were placed in newspapers around the U.S., headlined "Announcing the National Broadcasting Company, Inc." and subtitled "National radio broadcasting with better programs permanently assured by this important action of the Radio Corporation of America in the interest of the listening public." The RCA company declared that NBC would launch on November 15, the date that the company would assume active control of the New York City station WEAF, and declared that the purpose of the company "will be to provide the best program available for broadcasting in the United States," adding that besides presenting them on WEAF, it would make the programs "available to other broadcasting stations throughout the country so far as it may be practicable to do so" and that "It is hoped that arrangements may be made so that every event of national importance may be broadcast widely throughout the United States." The NBC network was scheduled to begin on November 15, when RCA's acquisition of the New York City radio station WEAF was to be completed.
- Born:
  - Sidney Drell, American theoretical physicist specializing in quantum electrodynamics and high-energy particle physics, known for developing the Drell–Yan process; in Atlantic City, New Jersey (d. 2016)
  - Emile Francis, Canadian NHL ice hockey player, coach and general manager, known for coaching the New York Rangers from 1965 to 1975, later inducted to the Hockey Hall of Fame (d. 2022)

== September 14, 1926 (Tuesday) ==
- Elections were held for all 245 seats in the House of Commons of Canada. The Conservative Party of Prime Minister Arthur Meighen, which had held 115 seats compared to 100 for the Liberal Party of W. L. Mackenzie King, lost 24 seats. The Liberal Party gained 16 seats for a 116 to 91 seat plurality; the other 38 seats were divided among seven minor parties. With 123 seats needed for a majority, King added the MPs from the Liberal–Progressive Party, which had won 8 seats, and he returned as Prime Minister to replace that of Meighen.
- Argentina enacted law No. 11,357, the women's civil rights law, providing more legal protection for married women
- The West End theatre play The Constant Nymph, based on the 1924 novel by Margaret Kennedy and starring Noël Coward, Edna Best and Cathleen Nesbitt, premiered at the New Theatre (now the Noël Coward Theatre).
- Born:
  - Dick Dale, American singer and saxophone player, known for The Lawrence Welk Show; in Algona, Iowa (d. 2014)

== September 15, 1926 (Wednesday) ==
- Jelly Roll Morton (Ferdinand LeMothe) and his Red Hot Peppers recorded "Black Bottom Stomp" in Chicago.
- The new Rudyard Kipling collection Debits and Credits was published. One poem, "The Vineyard", drew controversy as it was interpreted as a criticism of the United States' late entry into World War I. One stanza read: "At the eleventh hour he came/But his wages were the same/As ours who all day long had trod/The winepress of the wrath of God."
- Born:
  - Jean-Pierre Serre, French mathematician; in Bages, Pyrénées-Orientales département (alive in 2026)
  - Ed Derwinski, American politician and the first U.S. Secretary of Veterans Affairs, from 1989 to 1992, as well as U.S. Representative for Illinois from 1959 to 1983; in Chicago (d. 2012)
  - Bübüsara Beyshenalieva, Soviet Kyrgyz ballerina; in Vorontsovka, Kirghiz ASSR (now Tash-Döbö, Kyrgyzstan) (d. 1973)
- Died:
  - Rudolf Christoph Eucken, 80, German writer and Nobel Prize laureate
  - Georg Meyer, 33, German World War One fighter ace credited with downing 18 enemy aircraft, was killed in a motorcycle accident.

== September 16, 1926 (Thursday) ==
- La Opinión, the most-read Spanish language newspaper in the United States and second only to the English language Los Angeles Times as the best-selling L.A. daily newspaper, published its first issue. and was in its 100th year of existence in 2026.
- Asa Keyes, District Attorney of Los Angeles County in California, ordered the arrest of Aimee Semple McPherson, her mother, and three others on charges including "conspiracy to commit acts injurious to public morals".
- Broadway, a play directed by George Abbott and written by Philip Dunning, opened on Broadway at the Broadhurst Theatre for the first of 603 performances.
- The Italian and Romanian governments signed a Treaty of Friendship in which Italy offered Romania a large loan in return for oil and other concessions.
- Shin-Etsu Chemical, the largest chemical manufacturer in Japan, was founded in Nagano City asn Shin-Etsu Nitrogen Fertilizer Company.
- Born:
  - Robert H. Schuller, American Christian televangelist known for his syndicated Sunday program Hour of Power and for six bestselling inspirational books, including Way to the Good Life (1963), You Can Be the Person You Want to Be (1976), Tough Times Never Last But Tough People Do (Thomas Nelson Publishing, 1983); in Alton, Iowa (d. 2015)
  - John Knowles, American novelist known for A Separate Peace (1959); in Fairmont, West Virginia (d. 2001)

== September 17, 1926 (Friday) ==
- In the French border village of Thoiry, Foreign Ministers Aristide Briand of France and Gustav Stresemann of Germany held a conference to discuss various points of contention between the two countries. Tentative agreements were reached on the rest of the Rhineland and the Saar being returned to Germany in exchange for reparations payments, but no treaties resulted as the agreements were widely protested by the public, particularly in France.
- Film stars Mabel Normand and Lew Cody were married.
- Born:
  - Klaus Schütz, Mayor of West Berlin, 1967 to 1977; in Heidelberg, Weimar Republic of Germany (d. 2012)
  - Sir Donald Acheson, Northern Irish-born epidemiologist and Chief Medical Officer of the United Kingdom from 1983 to 1991; in Belfast (d. 2010)
- Died: Rashid Talaa, 49, the first Prime Minister of the Emirate of Transjordan (now the Kingdom of Jordan) from April to August 1921, was killed at Shbeki in the French Mandate of Syria during a battle with French troops during the Great Syrian Revolt.

== September 18, 1926 (Saturday) ==
- A Category 4 hurricane that would kill at least 372 people struck Miami and much of the southern portion of the U.S. state of Florida, making landfall near the town of Perrine shortly before 7:00 in the morning local time, 15 miles (24 km) south of downtown Miami. At the time, the population of the Miami metropolitan area was less than 214,000 people, compared to more than 6.2 million a century later. An estimated $100 million damage was done and many buildings in downtown Miami were destroyed. A 2018 study concluded that, given the growth of the area, the damage to the same locations would be $235 billion ninety years later.
- The Sherlock Holmes short story "The Adventure of the Three Gables" by Sir Arthur Conan Doyle was published for the first time in Liberty magazine in the United States.
- The Hungarian operetta Countess Maritza, composed by Emmerich Kálmán and adapted to the English language by Harry B. Smith, with libretto by Julius Brammer and Alfred Grünwald, made its Broadway debut, premiering at the Shubert Theatre for the first of 318 performances.
- Born:
  - Enrico Maria Salerno, Italian voice actor and film actor, known for dubbing the voice for Clint Eastwood in Sergio Leone's Dollars Trilogy of films; in Milan (d. 1994)
  - Foekje Dilemma, Dutch athlete and sprinter known for being banned from competition by the IAAF in 1950 after refusing a sex verification test; in Burum (d. 2007)
  - Thomas Hetherington, Scottish barrister and prosecutor, and the first director of the Crown Prosecution Service; in Dumfriesshire (d. 2007)
- Died: Joseph S. Bartley, 67, Nebraska State Treasurer 1893-1897, and subsequently convicted embezzler who spent five years in prison.

== September 19, 1926 (Sunday) ==
- Aimee Semple McPherson announced a legal defense fund for herself to "fight the devil" during a sermon at the Angelus Temple.
- The San Siro stadium, home of both the AC Milan and Inter Milan soccer football teams, was inaugurated in Milan. With capacity for 75,817 spectators, it is the largest stadium in Italy and one of the largest in Europe.
- Born:
  - Duke Snider (Edwin Donald Snider), American baseball player and Baseball Hall of Fame enshrinee, 1956 home run leader in the National League; in Los Angeles (d. 2011)
  - Victoria Barbă, Russian-born Moldovan animated children's film director and founder of Floricica Studios; in Tambov, Russian SFSR, Soviet Union (d. 2020)
  - James Lipton, American television host and writer; in Detroit (d. 2020)

== September 20, 1926 (Monday) ==
- An F5 tornado killed more than 300 people in the city of Encarnación in Paraguay

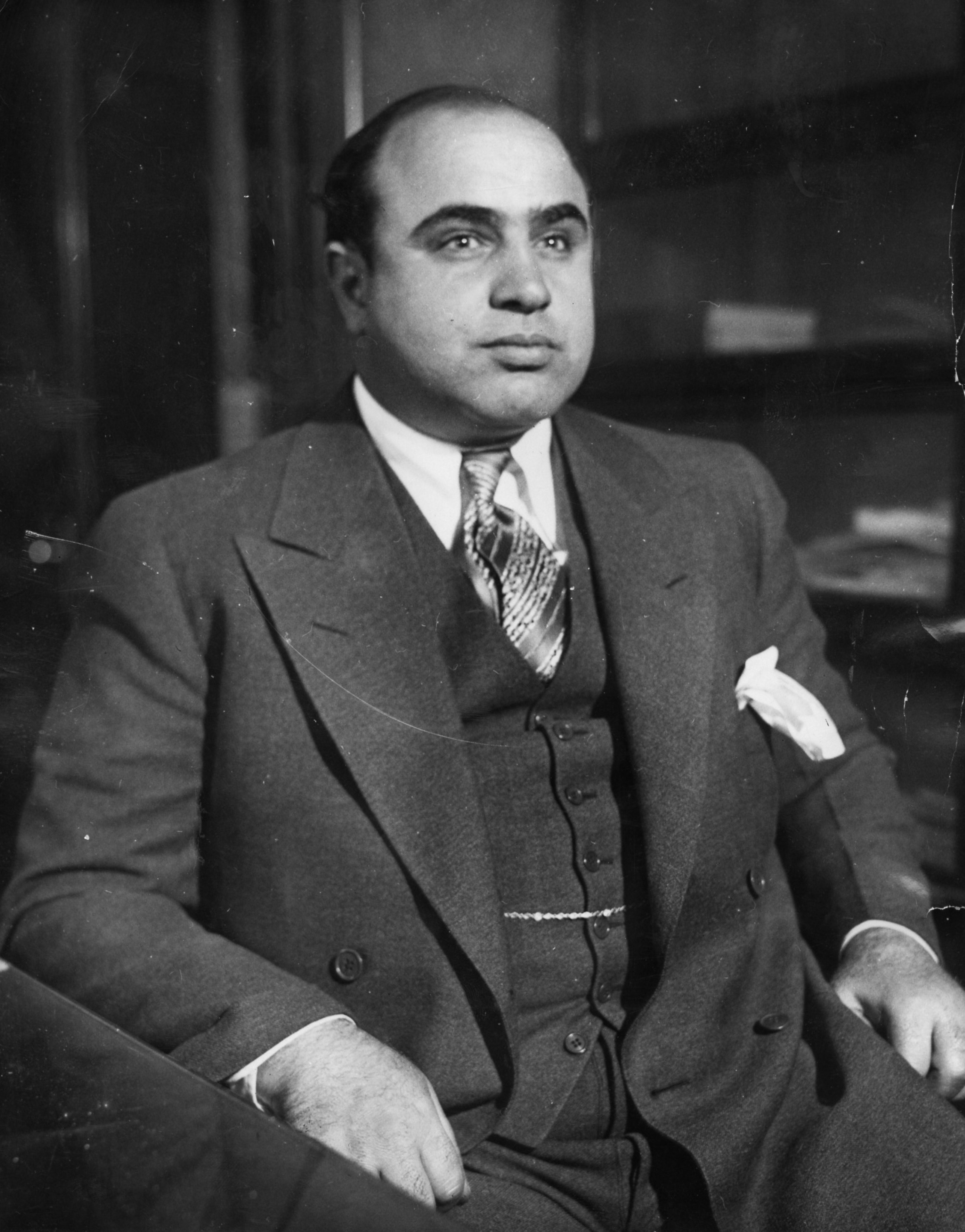
Capone

- Chicago's The North Side Gang attempted to assassinate Al Capone, spraying his headquarters in Cicero, Illinois, with over a thousand rounds of machine gun fire in broad daylight as Capone was eating there. Capone escaped harm.
- The Miami hurricane continued its path of destruction, striking Pensacola, Florida, and completely destroying almost every pier, warehouse and boat in Pensacola Bay.
- Born:
  - Francesco Di Cataldo, Italian prison administrator and Deputy Commander of the San Vittore Prison in Milan from 1951 until his assassination by the Red Brigades (killed 1978); in Barletta.

== September 21, 1926 (Tuesday) ==
- The Miami hurricane began to dissipate as it entered Louisiana. All told, the hurricane killed at least 373 people, injured over 6,000 others, and did the equivalent of about $90 billion damage in modern dollars.
- An attempt by French aviator René Fonck to win the Orteig Prize, for the first non-stop transatlantic airplane flight, ended in disaster upon his takeoff from Long Island's Roosevelt Field near New York City. Accompanied by a crew of three assistants, Fonck was racing down the runway in a redesigned tri-motor Sikorsky S-35 airplane when the auxiliary landing gear collapsed under the weight of the four people on board. The S-35 cartwheeled off of the end of the runway and burst into flames. Captain Fonck, a French flying ace in World War One leapt to safety along with his co-pilot, U.S. Navy Lt. Lawrence W. Curtin, but French radio operator Charles Clavier and Russian mechanic Jacob Islamoff were trapped in the closed cabin and burned to death.
- Mushy Callahan (ring name for Vincent Scheer) defeated world champion Myron "Pinky" Mitchell in a 10-round bout in Vernon, California, to win the world light welterweight boxing championship.
- Born:
  - Donald A. Glaser, American physicist and 1960 Nobel Prize in Physics laureate for his 1952 invention of the bubble chamber, a container of superheated transparent liquid (most often liquid hydrogen) used to detect electrically charged particles moving through it; in Cleveland, Ohio (d. 2013)
  - Noor Jehan, Pakistani film singer and actress, credited with singing "a total of 2,422 songs in 1,148 Pakistani films during a career that lasted more than half a century" in Kasur, Punjab province, British India (now in Pakistan) (d. 2000)
  - Don Dunstan, Australian politician and longtime Premier of the state of South Australia from 1967 to 1968 and 1970 to 1979; in Suva, Fiji to Australian parents (d. 1999)
- Died:
  - Léon Charles Thévenin, 59, French telegraphy engineer known for his postulation in 1883 of Thévenin's theorem to calculate currents in complex electrical circuits to reduce the current to simpler equivalent circuits.

== September 22, 1926 (Wednesday) ==
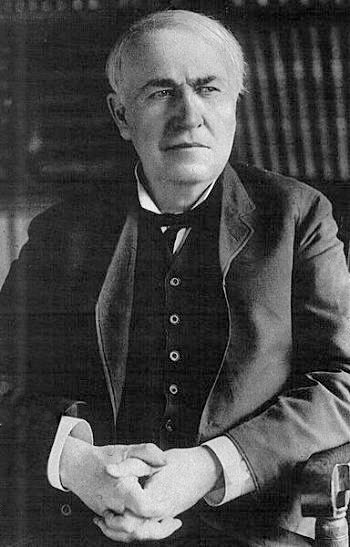
Edison

- Argentina's President Marcelo Torcuato de Alvear signed Law No. 11,357 granting all Argentine women of legal age, regardless of marital status, the same civil rights and functions granted to men.
- American inventor Thomas Edison declared radio broadcasting to be a commercial failure, saying, "There isn't 10 percent of the interest in radio that there was last year. It's a highly complicated machine in the hands of people who know nothing about it. No dealers have made any money out of it. It isn't a commercial machine, because it is complicated ... The phonograph is coming back into its own, because the people want good music." Edison had invented the phonograph in 1877 along with cylinders designed to record sound and to play it back, but had seen a dramatic decline in the sale of disc records and phonographs in the 1920s after radio receivers and radio networks had been introduced.
- Died: María Luisa de la Riva y Callol-Muñoz, 61, Spanish painter

== September 23, 1926 (Thursday) ==
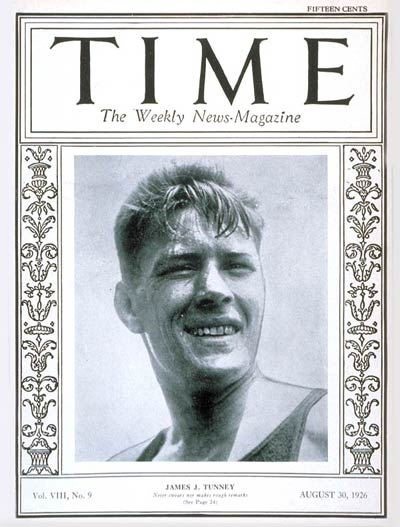
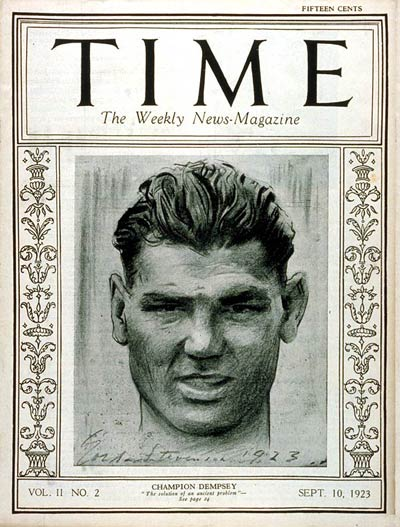
Gene Tunney and Jack Dempsey

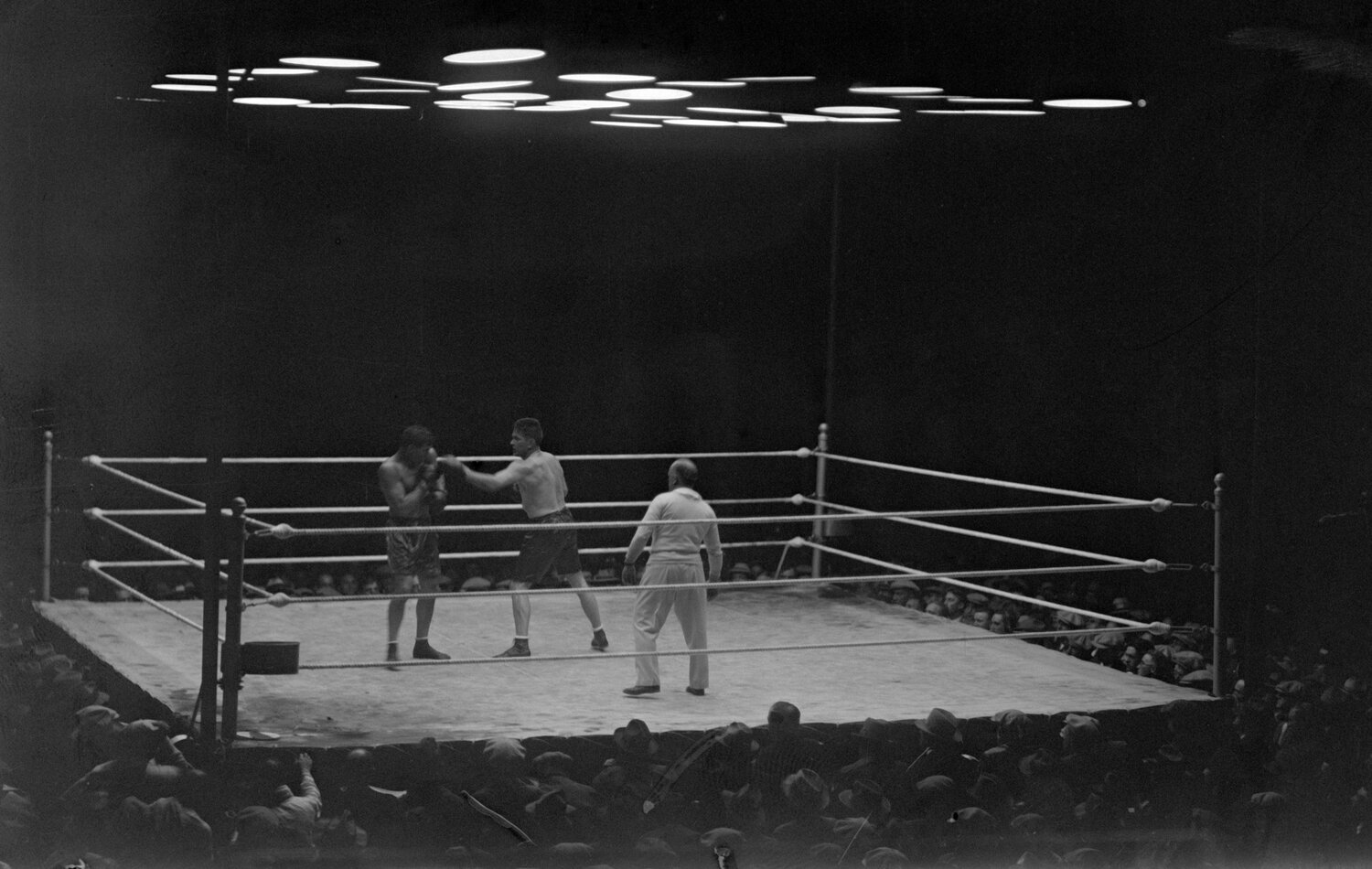
Gene Tunney (right) throws a punch at champion Jack Dempsey (left) as referee Tommy Reilly watches

- Challenger Gene Tunney defeated world heavyweight boxing champion Jack Dempsey by unanimous decision in a 10-round bout, fought before a record crown of 120,557 paid spectators at Philadelphia's Sesquicentennial Stadium, and a total crowd of more than 132,000. Dempsey, who had won 62 fights and lost only 4, had not defended his title in more than three years since his previous bout on September 14, 1923. Tunney, who had last fought on December 29, had won 17 bouts since Dempsey's last fight, had a record of 77 wins and 1 loss going into the bout.
- The United States negotiated a 15-day armistice in the Nicaraguan Civil War on the U.S.S. Rochester as General Jose Maria Moncada, the leader of the Liberal Party rebels, accepted a counter-proposal for a ceasefire made by Nicaragua's President Chamorro.
- Born:
  - John Coltrane, American jazz saxophonist; in Hamlet, North Carolina (died from liver cancer, 1967)
  - André Cassagnes, French toymaker who invented the Etch A Sketch; in Montrouge, Hauts-de-Seine département (d. 2023)

== September 24, 1926 (Friday) ==
- The St. Louis Cardinals clinched the National League pennant with a 6 to 4 win over the fifth place New York Giants. to finish with an 89–65 record, two games ahead of the 87-67 Cincinnati Reds.
- The Pabst Mine Disaster occurred at the Pabst Iron Mine in Ironwood, Michigan. Three mine electricians were killed when the elevator they were in fell down the shaft, and 43 miners were trapped underground when the shaft was then sealed by a rock fall. The 43 miners were entombed for 129 hours (five days and nine hours) until they were rescued.
- Born:
  - Aubrey Burl, British archaeologist and specialist on megaliths and stone circles (d. 2020)
  - Reg Kermode, Australian entrepreneur known for founding the controversial taxicab service Cabcharge; in Smithtown, New South Wales (d. 2014)

== September 25, 1926 (Saturday) ==
- The League of Nations Slavery Convention, with member nations pledging to abolish all types of slavery within their jurisdiction, was signed by representatives of Australia, Austria, Belgium, British India, Bulgaria, Denmark, Finland, Haiti, Latvia, Nicaragua, Norway, Portugal, South Africa, Spain, Sudan, Sweden, and the United Kingdom.
- Henry Ford introduced the eight-hour day and five-day workweek at the Ford Motor Company, excusing his employees from having to work on Saturday for the first time in the company's history.
- The New York Yankees took a doubleheader from the St. Louis Browns by scores of 10–2 and 10–4 to clinch the American League pennant. The doubleheader wins put the Yankees four games ahead of the Cleveland Indians with only 3 games left in the season.
- The National Hockey League (NHL) officially added the Chicago Black Hawks, Detroit Cougars (now the Red Wings) and New York Rangers to the league as new teams for the 1926–27 season.
- Bertolt Brecht's play Man Equals Man (Mann ist Mann) was performed for the first time, premiering at a theater in Darmstadt under the direction of Jacob Geis.
- Born:
  - Michael Sokolski, Polish-born American design engineer who invented the Scantron OMR scanner for grading of academic multiple choice tests; in Rovno (now Rivne in Ukraine (d. 2012)
  - Anthony Stafford Beer, British theorist in operational research and management cybernetics at the University of Manchester; in Fulham, London (d. 2002)
- Died: Sir Madan Singh, 41, Indian prince and Maharaja of the Kishangarh State in British India, died from heart failure. He would be succeeded by his adoptive son, Yagya Narayan Singh.

== September 26, 1926 (Sunday) ==
- The new American Football League, founded as 9-team competitor to the established National Football League (which had grown to a record 22 separate teams) played three games to inaugurate its season. At the Luna Bowl in Cleveland, Ohio, 22,000 fans paid to see the visiting New York Yankees football team and its showcase star, Red Grange, play against the Cleveland Panthers. Cleveland defeated New York, 10 to 0. At Davids' Stadium in Newark, New Jersey, the Chicago Bulls and the Newark Bears played to a 7 to 7 tie. Finally, at Browning Field in Moline, Illinois, the Rock Island Independents, formerly of the NFL, beat a touring team that billed itself as the Los Angeles Wildcats, 7 to 3. Buck White of Chicago made the first AFL score, a five-yard run touchdown in the first quarter.
- Born:
  - Masatoshi Koshiba, Japanese astrophysicist and 2002 Nobel Prize laureate for his detection of cosmic neutrinos; in Toyohashi, Aichi Prefecture (d. 2020)
  - Julie London (stage name for Julie Peck), American film and television actress, singer, inductee to the Grammy Hall of Fame and co-star of the TV series Emergency!, in Santa Rosa, California (d. 2000)
- Died:
  - General José María Orellana, 54, President of Guatemala since leading a coup d'etat in 1921, died suddenly at his hotel room during a vacation in Antigua. Vice President Lázaro Chacón took office as interim president, lifted martial law and restrictions against the press, and set elections for December 5.

== September 27, 1926 (Monday) ==
- Louis Franck, formerly Belgium's Minister of Colonies took charge of the Kingdom's economy as he became the Governor of the National Bank of Belgium. Franck would serve for 11 years and come under investigation on suspicion of malfeasance before committing suicide on December 31, 1937.
- American burglars Ray Terrill and Elmer H. Inman escaped together from the Oklahoma State Penitentiary in McAlester, a few months after being captured, and began to form the Terrill Gang again, and recruiting gangster Matthew Kimes to combine forces in the Kimes-Terrill Gang.
- Born:
  - Sibghatullah Mojaddedi, Acting President of Afghanistan from April to June in 1992, and Speaker of the House of Elders from 2005 to 2011; in Kabul (d. 2019)

== September 28, 1926 (Tuesday) ==
- The Soviet–Lithuanian Non-Aggression Pact was signed, confirming all basic provisions of the Soviet–Lithuanian Peace Treaty of 1920, with the addendum that Lithuania would not enter into any alliances opposed to the Soviet Union, including the League of Nations.
- More Mexican citizens joined the Cristero War, as Luis Navarro Origel, the mayor of the small city of Pénjamo, in the Guanajuato state, led an uprising.
- Born:
  - Jerry Clower, American comedian and country music artist; in Liberty, Mississippi (d. 1998)
  - Teruko Ishizaka, Japanese immunologist who discovered the antibody class Immunoglobulin E (IgE) in 1966, in research with her husband Kimishige Ishizaka; in Yamagata (d. 2019)
- Died:
  - Satarō Fukiage, 37, Japanese rapist and serial killer known for murdering at least seven girls, including six from June 1923 to April 1924, was executed by hanging.
  - Pramod Ranjan Choudhury and Anantahari Mitra, Bengali independence activists in British India, were executed by hanging at Alipore jail in Calcutta for the assassination in May 28 of Bhupendranath Chatterjee, a deputy superintendent of the government's Police Intelligence Branch.
  - Patty Prather Thum, 72, American painter

== September 29, 1926 (Wednesday) ==
- The controversial Broadway play The Captive, by French playwright Édouard Bourdet, premiered at the Empire Theatre, produced and directed by Gilbert Miller and translated and adapted by Arthur Hornblow, Jr.. Addressing the topic of lesbianism, had a primarily female cast, although Basil Rathbone was the co-star with Helen Menken. It would run for 160 performances before being shut down by New York City police on February 3, 1927. It was among several plays that would lead to a New York state law, the "Wales Padlock Act", prohibiting the depiction of homosexuality in the state's theaters.
- After 129 hours trapped 727 feet (222 m) underground after the shaft collapse at the Pabst Company iron mine at Ironwood, Michigan, all 43 of the entombed miners were safely rescued.
- Born:
  - Alexander Dolgun, American file clerk at the U.S. Embassy in Moscow who was arrested by Soviet secret police in 1948 and imprisoned at the Lubyanka and Lefortovo prisons and prison camps until 1955; in the Bronx, New York City (d. 1986). After being allowed to leave the Soviet Union in 1971, Dolgun wrote the bestselling book An American in the Gulag in 1975.
  - Chaz Bowyer, British Royal Air Force explosives expert and author of 40 books about the operations, aircraft and men of the RAF; in Weymouth, Dorset (d. 2008)
  - Russ Heath, American DC Comics and Playboy magazine illustrator; in New York City (d. 2018)
  - Vivienne Cassie Cooper, New Zealand botanist and planktologist; in Epsom, New Zealand (d. 2021)

== September 30, 1926 (Thursday) ==
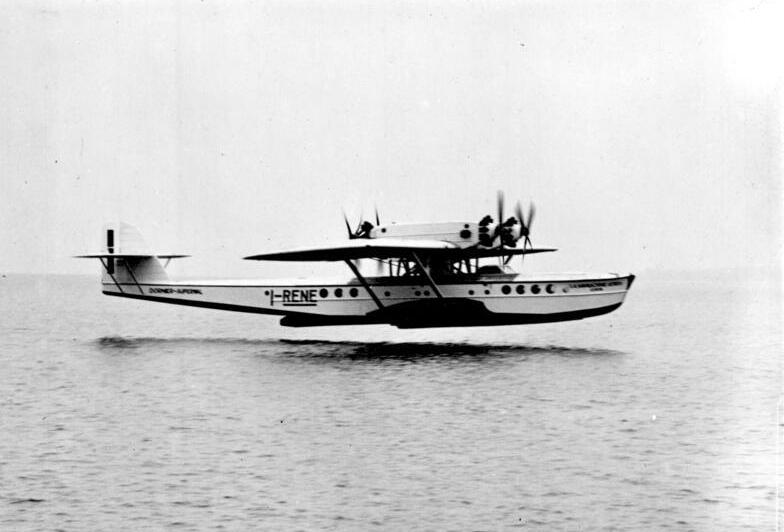
Germany's Superwal airliner

- The three-engine Superwal, manufactured by the German company Dornier, with seating for 21 passengers and the fastest seaplane airliner up that time, made its maiden flight.
- The International Steel Agreement went into effect, creating a cartel for fixing a uniform price by the steel manufacturers of Germany, France, the United Kingdom.
- British Foreign Affairs Secretary Austen Chamberlain met with Benito Mussolini at the Tuscan port of Livorno. It was reported that the discussions were cordial and topics included the possibility of restoring the monarchy in Greece, Franco-German economic relations, and the administration of Tangier.
- Born:
  - Robin Roberts, American baseball pitcher, inductee to the Baseball Hall of Fame, National League leader in strikeouts (1953-1954) and wins (1952-1955); in Springfield, Illinois (d. 2010)
