= List of Festa della Repubblica by event from 1946 =

Military ceremony in the Italian Army

This is a list of the Festa della Repubblica ceremonies in Rome, from 1946 to the present. The first Festa della republica military Parade took place on 2 June 1948. In 1976, no parade or ceremony was held at the Altar of the Fatherland following the disastrous earthquake that struck Friuli on 6 May. Since 2000, in some years, the military parade has had a specific theme.

== Date ranges ==
In 1946, institutional referendum to decide which form of monarchy or republic.

From 1947 to 1948, no military parade.

From 1949 to 1975, after inclusion in the protocol of celebrations for the Festa della Repubblica, which takes place along Via dei Fori Imperiali, has become a regular feature of the June 2 celebrations

In 1976, first republican celebration not organized following the Friuli earthquake only ceremony at the Altare della Patria was carried out.

In 1977, severe economic crisis in 70's, the ceremony was held in Piazza Venezia for ceremony at the Altare della Patria.

From 1978 to 1982, ceremony at the Altare della Patria was organized on the first Sunday of June.

From 1983 to 1988, return the military parades was organized on the first Sunday of June.

In 1989, after the parade was suspended again, only ceremony at the Altare della Patria and a historical exhibition was organized in Piazza di Siena in Rome

From 1990 to 1992, ceremony was held only in Piazza Venezia for the ceremony at the Altare della Patria.

From 1993 to 1999, ceremony at the Altare della Patria returns to 2 June, but not a holiday.

In 2000, first military parade return to via dei Fori Imperiali after its suspension, strongly wanted by Carlo Azeglio Ciampi the return of the parade and last to be celebrated on the first Sunday of June.

From 2001, return regular feature the military parade celebrated on 2 June after its reinstatement by law no. 336 of 20 November 2000.

== List ==
| Year | Date | Themes | | Anniversary | President | Remarks |
| Year | Date | Italian | English | Anniversary | President | Remarks |
|---|---|---|---|---|---|---|
| 1946 | Sun 2 June | No themes | | 0 anniversary | Enrico De Nicola | There were no parades because there was an institutional referendum to decide which form of state – monarchy or republic – to give to the country. Enrico De Nicola was elected provisional head of state by the Constituent Assembly on 28 June 1946 and held this office from 1 July of the same year to 31 December 1947. |
| 1947 | Mon 2 June | No themes | | 1st anniversary | Enrico De Nicola | On the occasion of first celebration of Festa della Repubblica and anniversary of the referendum that established the Republic Enrico De Nicola goes to the Chamber of Deputies acclaimed by the crowd. First time the Fiat 2800 was used, which would be used until 1960. |
| 1948 | Wed 2 June | No themes | | 2nd anniversary | Luigi Einaudi | First and only time laying of a laurel wreath on the Tomb of the Unknown Soldier at the Altar of the Fatherland had to wait until 1955 to restore it. It was the only time that Einaudi laying of a laurel wreath on the Tomb of the Unknown Soldier |
| 1949 | Wed 1 June | No themes | | 3rd anniversary | Luigi Einaudi | First military parade in Via dei Fori Imperiali in Rome and Einaudi's first military parade settled on 12 May 1948. In that year, 2 June was definitively declared a national holiday and Italy joined NATO |
| 1950 | Fri 2 June | No themes | | 4th anniversary | Luigi Einaudi | The parade was included in the protocol of celebrations for the Festa della Repubblica, which takes place along Via dei Fori Imperiali, has become a regular feature of the June 2 celebrations. It saw the participation of various components of the armed forces and other state bodies. On that occasion, President Luigi Einaudi reviewed the troops from a car. The parade included parades of military academics, navy, air force, and other armed forces. After the parade, a historical carousel was performed by mounted Carabinieri. |
| 1951 | Sat 2 June | No themes | | 5th anniversary | Luigi Einaudi | First broadcast by Radio Audizioni Italiane (RAI). |
| 1952 | Mon 2 June | No themes | | 6th anniversary | Luigi Einaudi | |
| 1953 | Tue 2 June | No themes | | 7th anniversary | Luigi Einaudi | |
| 1954 | Wen 2 June | No themes | | 8th anniversary | Luigi Einaudi | Last military parade of Luigi Einaudi ends his term on 11 May 1955. First shown on RAI. |
| 1955 | Thu 2 June | No themes | | 9th anniversary | Giovanni Gronchi | First military parade of Giovanni Gronchi settled on 11 May 1955. In that year the laying of a wreath to the Unknown Soldier at the Altar of the Fatherland was reinstated and will be maintained permanently together with the military parade. |
| 1956 | Sat 2 June | No themes | | 10th anniversary | Giovanni Gronchi | The parade was dedicated to the tenth anniversary of the birth of the Italian Republic |
| 1957 | Sun 2 June | No themes | | 11th anniversary | Giovanni Gronchi | |
| 1958 | Mon 2 June | No themes | | 12th anniversary | Giovanni Gronchi | |
| 1959 | Tue 2 June | No themes | | 13th anniversary | Giovanni Gronchi | First time ALE (Aviazione dell'Esercito) aircraft are taking part in the military parade |
| 1960 | Thu 2 June | No themes | | 14th anniversary | Giovanni Gronchi | It was the last time that the Fiat 2800 was used as a presidential car and it was replaced by the Flaminia 335 |
| 1961 | Sun 11 June | No themes | | 15th anniversary | Giovanni Gronchi | The military parade did not take place on 2 June and not in Rome in Via dei Fori Imperiali as traditionally, but it was postponed to 11 June to celebrate of the centenary of Italian unificationin at Corso Duca degli Abruzzi in Turin, the first capital (1861-1865), and for the Expo 61. Last military parade of Giovanni Gronchi ends his term on 11 May 1962 |
| 1962 | Sat 2 June | No themes | | 16th anniversary | Antonio Segni | First military parade of Antonio Segni settled on 11 May 1962. First time the Lancia Flaminia "335" Presidenziale was used and it will be used in subsequent parades. |
| 1963 | Sun 2 June; Mon 4 November | No themes | | 17th anniversary | Antonio Segni | On 2 June of that year the traditional parade was not held, but a laurel wreath was placed on the Tomb of the Unknown Soldier due to the death of Pope John XXIII, who died the next day, and was postponed to 4 November of that year. |
| 1964 | Tue 2 June | No themes | | 18th anniversary | Antonio Segni | Last military parade of Antonio Segni before his resignation on 6 December 1964 after his Cerebral thrombosis on 7 August 1964 |
| 1965 | Wen 2 June | No themes | | 19th anniversary | Giuseppe Saragat | For the 50th anniversary of Italy's entry into the First World War was also commemorated. Specifically, Italy officially began military operations in World War I on 24 May 1915. The banners of the suppressed military units that took part in the World War I also participated in the main celebration of Rome; the first cannon shot fired by Fort Verena, on the Asiago plateau, towards the Austrian fortresses located on the Vezzena Plain: to the first infantry of the Royal Italian Army that crossed the border is dedicated the first stanza of La Leggenda del Piave. First military parade of Giuseppe Saragat settled on 29 December 1964 |
| 1966 | Thu 2 June | No themes | | 20th anniversary | Giuseppe Saragat | The parade was dedicated to the twentieth anniversary of the birth of the Italian Republic |
| 1967 | Fri 2 June | No themes | | 21st anniversary | Giuseppe Saragat | |
| 1968 | Sat 2 June | No themes | | 22nd anniversary | Giuseppe Saragat | |
| 1969 | Sun 2 June | No themes | | 23rd anniversary | Giuseppe Saragat | |
| 1970 | Tue 2 June | No themes | | 24th anniversary | Giuseppe Saragat | |
| 1971 | Wen 2 June | No themes | | 25th anniversary | Giuseppe Saragat | Last military parade of Giuseppe Saragat ends his term on 29 December 1971 |
| 1972 | Thu 2 June | No themes | | 26th anniversary | Giovanni Leone | First military parade of Giovanni Leone settled on 29 December 1971 |
| 1973 | Sat 2 June | No themes | | 27th anniversary | Giovanni Leone | |
| 1974 | Sun 2 June | No themes | | 28th anniversary | Giovanni Leone | |
| 1975 | Mon 2 June | No themes | | 29th anniversary | Giovanni Leone | For the thirtieth anniversary of the end of the Second World War, in 1975, some Flag Groups of the formations, regular and otherwise, that had participated in the War of Liberation were introduced into the parade structure, together with the Gonfalons of the cities decorated with the Gold Medal for Military Valor. Last military parade before his elimination in 1977 |
| 1976 | Wen 2 June | No themes | | 30th anniversary | Giovanni Leone | The military parade was not organized following the disastrous earthquake of Friuli and replaced by a wreath-laying ceremony at the Unknown Soldier |
| 1977 | Sun 5 June | No themes | | 31st anniversary | Giovanni Leone | First Festa della Repubblica not celebrated with its traditional parade due to the severe economic crisis that gripped Italy in the 1970s, in order to contain state and social costs, Law No. 54 of March 5, 1977, made Republic Day a "movable feast" and moved it to the first Sunday in June, thus eliminating June 2 as a public holiday. The ceremony was held in Piazza Venezia, with a Brigade of 43 companies representing all armed and non-armed forces and corps of the state and it remained traditional wreath-laying ceremony at the Unknown Soldier. |
| 1978 | Sun 4 June | No themes | | 32nd anniversary | Giovanni Leone | Ceremony at the Altare della Patria - Laying of a laurel wreath by the Head of State at the Monument to the Unknown Soldier. Last ceremony at the Altare della Patria of Giovanni Leone before his resignation on 15 June 1978 after Lockheed scandals. The previous months were difficult following the Kidnapping and murder of Aldo Moro and Acca Larentia killings (7 January) the killings of magistrate Riccardo Palma (14 February), Public security Marshal Rosario Berardi (10 March), Lorenzo Cutugno (11 April), Francesco Di Cataldo (20 April) by Red Brigades, the Killing of Fausto and Iaio (18 March) by probably far-right elements and the murder of Peppino Impastato by Cosa Nostra, his body was found on the same day that Aldo Moro was found on 9 May. In the following months, between August and October, three popes succeeded one another: Paul VI, who died on August 6, the election and death of John Paul I, and the election of John Paul II. It's known as the L'Anno dei Tre Papi and still the killings of the commander of the Udine prison Antonio Santoro (6 June) by Cesare Battisti, Police commissioner Antonio Esposito (21 June), the magistrate Girolamo Tartaglione (10 October) by Red Brigades, also the murder of graduate Ivo Zini by NAR and Chief Prosecutor of Frosinone Fedele Calvosa (8 November) by Formazioni comuniste combattenti, on 23 December the Alitalia Flight 4128. It was a terrible year for Italy |
| 1979 | Sun 2 June | No themes | | 33rd anniversary | Sandro Pertini | First ceremony at the Altare della Patria - Laying of a laurel wreath of Sandro Pertini settled on 9 July 1978, it was held on 2 June so as not to interfere with the general elections taking place the following day. |
| 1980 | Sun 1 June | No themes | | 34th anniversary | Sandro Pertini | The previous months were difficult following murder of Christian Democrat president of the Sicilian Region, Piersanti Mattarella by Cosa Nostra, the assassination of vice president of the CSM and university professor Vittorio Bachelet by the Red Brigades, the assassination of judge Guido Galli by the Prima Linea and the murder of journalist of the Corriere della Sera Walter Tobagi by the Brigata XXVIII marzo, on 28 March Via Fracchia massacre. In the following months were very difficult, twenty-six days later Ustica massacre, next month Libyan Air Force MiG-23 crash, in August the Bologna massacre, in November Curinga train disaster and two days after Irpinia earthquake. It was a difficult year for Italy |
| 1981 | Sun 7 June | No themes | | 35th anniversary | Sandro Pertini | |
| 1982 | Sun 6 June | No themes | | 36th anniversary | Sandro Pertini | |
| 1983 | Sun 5 June | No themes | | 37th anniversary | Sandro Pertini | The military parade was reinserted, after five years, in the official ceremony of the main celebration of Rome in that year the Festa della Repubblica was organized on the first Sunday of June between the Aventine and Porta San Paolo to commemorate the Resistance to the German occupation of the city of Rome during the World War II |
| 1984 | Sun 3 June | No themes | | 38th anniversary | Sandro Pertini | The parade return to Via dei Fori Imperiali. |
| 1985 | Sun 2 June | No themes | | 39th anniversary | Sandro Pertini | The parade took place between Via dei Cerchi and the Baths of Caracalla. Last military parade of Sandro Pertini before his courtesy resignation on 29 June 1985 to allow the installation of his successor, already elected |
| 1986 | Sun 1 June | No themes | | 40th anniversary | Francesco Cossiga | The parade return to Via dei Fori Imperiali. First military parade of Francesco Cossiga settled on 3 July 1985. The parade was dedicated to the fortieth anniversary of the birth of the Italian Republic |
| 1987 | Sun 7 June | No themes | | 41st anniversary | Francesco Cossiga | |
| 1988 | Sun 5 June | No themes | | 42nd anniversary | Francesco Cossiga | |
| 1989 | Sun 4 June | No themes | | 43rd anniversary | Francesco Cossiga | The military parade was eliminated again; in its place, the traditional Laying of a laurel wreath by the Head of State at the Monument to the Unknown Soldier at Altare della Patria and a historical exhibition was organized in Piazza di Siena in Rome |
| 1990 | Sun 3 June | No themes | | 44th anniversary | Francesco Cossiga | The ceremony was held only in Piazza Venezia the following year as well. |
| 1991 | Sun 2 June | No themes | | 45th anniversary | Francesco Cossiga | Last military parade of Francesco Cossiga before his courtesy resignation on 28 April 1992 to allow the installation of his successor, already elected |
| 1992 | Sun 7 June | No themes | | 46th anniversary | Oscar Luigi Scalfaro | The celebration of the Festa della Repubblica was limited exclusively, again, to the ceremony at the Altare della Patria. First celebration of Oscar Luigi Scalfaro settled on 28 May 1992. Five days earlier was killed by Sicilian Mafia magistrate Giovanni Falcone, his wife and three police escort agents, the Capaci bombing, and the following month, 19 July, the magistrate and Falcone's friend, Paolo Borsellino, was also killed by the Mafia and five members of his police escort, the Via D'Amelio bombing. The bomb exploded while he was walking to the entrance gate where his at mother lived and on 12 March Salvatore Lima was killed by Sicilian Mafia. It was a difficult year for Italy |
| 1993 | Wen 2 June | No themes | | 47th anniversary | Oscar Luigi Scalfaro | The ceremony at the Altare della Patria it was held on 2 June, but not as a holiday, which had to wait until 2001. |
| 1994 | Thu 2 June | No themes | | 48th anniversary | Oscar Luigi Scalfaro | |
| 1995 | Fri 2 June | No themes | | 49th anniversary | Oscar Luigi Scalfaro | |
| 1996 | Sun 2 June | No themes | | 50th anniversary | Oscar Luigi Scalfaro | The ceremony at the Altare della Patria was dedicated to the fiftieth anniversary of the birth of the Italian Republic |
| 1997 | Mon 2 June | No themes | | 51st anniversary | Oscar Luigi Scalfaro | |
| 1998 | Tue 2 June | No themes | | 52nd anniversary | Oscar Luigi Scalfaro | Last ceremony at the Altare della Patria of Oscar Luigi Scalfaro before his resignation on 15 May 1999 |
| 1999 | Wen 2 June | No themes | | 53rd anniversary | Carlo Azeglio Ciampi | First ceremony at the Altare della Patria of Carlo Azeglio Ciampi. Last ceremony before the restoration of the historic military parade |
| 2000 | Fri 2 June; Sun 4 June | Soldati di pace | Soldiers of peace | 54th anniversary | Carlo Azeglio Ciampi | The ceremony at the Altare della Patria it was held on 2 June and two after, 4 june, the first parade of Carlo Azeglio Ciampi, who had strongly wanted the return of the parade, and last celebrated on the first Sunday of June. First military parade with specific theme |
| 2001 | Sat 2 June | - | - | 55th anniversary | Carlo Azeglio Ciampi | First parade celebrated on 2 June after its reinstatement by law no. 336 of 20 November 2000 after twenty-four years of suspension |
| 2002 | Sun 2 June | - | - | 56th anniversary | Carlo Azeglio Ciampi | |
| 2003 | Mon 2 June | Le forze armate nel sistema di sicurezza internazionale per il progresso pacifico e democratico dei popoli | The armed forces in the international security system for the peaceful and democratic progress of peoples | 57th anniversary | Carlo Azeglio Ciampi | The Protezione Civile marched in the parade for the first time. It was initiated by Carlo Azeglio Ciampi |
| 2004 | Thu 2 June | Le forze armate per la Patria | The Armed Forces for the Fatherland | 58th anniversary | Carlo Azeglio Ciampi | |
| 2005 | Tue 2 June | - | - | 59th anniversary | Carlo Azeglio Ciampi | Last military parade of Carlo Azeglio Ciampi before his courtesy resignation on 15 May 2006 to allow the installation of his successor, already elected on 15 May 2006 |
| 2006 | Fri 2 June | - | - | 60th anniversary | Giorgio Napolitano | First military parade of Giorgio Napolitano held on 15 May 2006. The parade was dedicated to the sixtieth anniversary of the birth of the Italian Republic. This marked the first time the Colosseum was draped in a 2,000-square-metre Tricolour flag. This tradition was continued in subsequent years. |
| 2007 | Sat 2 June | - | - | 61st anniversary | Giorgio Napolitano | |
| 2008 | Mon 2 June | La Repubblica e le Sue Forze Armate | The Republic and its Armed Forces | 62nd anniversary | Giorgio Napolitano | |
| 2009 | Thu 2 June | La Repubblica e le Sue Forze Armate | The Republic and its Armed Forces | 63th anniversary | Giorgio Napolitano | The parade was dedicated to the L'Aquila earthquake victims |
| 2010 | Wen 2 June | La Repubblica e le sue forze armate impegnate in missioni di pace | The Republic and its armed forces engaged in peacekeeping | 64rd anniversary | Giorgio Napolitano | |
| 2011 | Tue 2 June | 150º anniversario dell'Unità d'Italia | 150th anniversary of the Unification of Italy | 65th anniversary | Giorgio Napolitano | At the parade, beyond the historic flags of Italy, the Tricolore di Oliosi also paraded. The historic flag, which paraded on a cannon carriage, dates back to the third Italian war of independence (1866) and was heroically saved in Oliosi, now a hamlet of the municipality of Castelnuovo del Garda, from capture by Austrian troops during the battle of Custoza. |
| 2012 | Sat 2 June | Le Forze Armate al servizio del Paese | The Armed Forces at the service of the country | 66th anniversary | Giorgio Napolitano | The parade was dedicated to the earthquake victims of Emilia. On that occasion, out of respect for the victims of the recent earthquake in Emilia and amidst the economic crisis, Italy held its parade without pageantry, military vehicles, or the Frecce Tricolori aerobatic team. The ceremony opened with a moving minute of silence, while the banners of the regions and provinces struck by the quake—Ferrara, Modena, Bologna, and Rovigo—stood out beneath the presidential stand as a sign of deep solidarity. Completing this scene of solemn restraint, the Cuirassiers marched on foot—an exceptional departure from tradition—symbolizing a nation united in grief and solidarity and the long-standing tradition of displaying the giant Tricolour on the Colosseum was not carried out. |
| 2013 | Sun 2 June | - | - | 67th anniversary | Giorgio Napolitano | The parade was dedicated to the "social question" of families and businesses in difficulty. For the second consecutive year, amidst the economic crisis and in the spirit of spending cuts, Republic Day is taking the form of a "low-cost," entirely on-foot parade. With no military vehicles, horses, Frecce Tricolori flyovers, or giant flag draped over the Colosseum, Italy is celebrating its institutions in the most stripped-down, austere, and sober manner in its history. |
| 2014 | Mon 2 June | - | - | 68th anniversary | Giorgio Napolitano | the parade was dedicated at the start of the semester of the Italian Presidency of the European Council. Return of the mounted Cuirassiers and the Frecce Tricolori. Last military parade of Giorgio Napolitano before his resignation on 14 January 2015 |
| 2015 | Thu 2 June | Forze Armate: garanzia di sicurezza e difesa | Armed Forces: guarantee of security and defense | 69th anniversary | Sergio Mattarella | the parade was dedicated on the centenary of the Italian victory in the Great War. The first military parade of Sergio Mattarella was held on 3 February 2015 |
| 2016 | Tue 2 June | 70 anni di Repubblica! L'Italia guarda al futuro | 70 years of the Republic! Italy looks to the future | 70th anniversary | Sergio Mattarella | The parade was dedicated to the seventieth anniversary of the birth of the Italian Republic. First parade with the mayors representing 8000 Italian municipalities |
| 2017 | Fri 2 June | - | - | 71st anniversary | Sergio Mattarella | The tenor singer Andrea Bocelli sang the Italian national anthem at the conclusion of the parade, is the first time a singer sang the Il Canto degli Itliani at the parade and the return of the giant flag draped over the Colosseum after a five-year absence |
| 2018 | Sat 2 June | - | - | 72nd anniversary | Sergio Mattarella | First time an Italian Army paratrooper landed in front of the presidential rostrum after flying over Via dei Fori Imperiali, unfurling a 400 m^{2} Italian flag |
| 2019 | Sun 2 June | Inclusione | Inclusion | 73rd anniversary | Sergio Mattarella | |
| 2020 | Thu 2 June | No themes | | 74th anniversary | Sergio Mattarella | Public event cancelled due to the coronavirus pandemic, after the traditional ceremony at the Altare della Patria, the celebration and speech by the President of the Republic Sergio Mattarella were held in Codogno, a municipality where the first confirmed outbreak of COVID-19 in Italy had been recorded just over three months earlier |
| 2021 | Wen 2 June | No themes | | 75th anniversary | Sergio Mattarella | Public event cancelled due to the coronavirus outbreak Sergio Mattarella laid a laurel wreath on the Tomb of the Unknown Soldier at the Altar of the Fatherland |
| 2022 | Tue 2 June | Insieme per la difesa della pace | Together for the defense of peace | 76th anniversary | Sergio Mattarella | The military parade returns after the COVID-19 pandemic and return of the Italian Army paratrooper with the 400 m^{2} Italian flag. The operatic pop trio Il Volo sang the Italian national anthem |
| 2023 | Fri 2 June | Italiani: un patrimonio di valori per la Repubblica | Italians: a heritage of values for the Republic | 77th anniversary | Sergio Mattarella | First time Italian Paralympic Committee are taking part in the military parade. The soprano opera singer Eleonora Buratto sang the Italian national anthem |
| 2024 | Sun 2 June | Al servizio del Paese | At the service of the country | 78th anniversary | Sergio Mattarella | The singer Claudio Baglioni sang the Italian national anthem. Showered by heavy rain |
| 2025 | Mon 2 June | A difesa della Repubblica, al servizio del Paese | In defence of the Republic, at the service of the country | 79th anniversary | Sergio Mattarella | The singer Arisa sang the Italian national anthem |
| 2026 | Thu 2 June | 80 anni di Repubblica. Ottant'anni al servizio del Paese | 80 years of the Republic. Eighty years of service to the country | 80th anniversary | Sergio Mattarella | The parade was dedicated to the eightieth anniversary of the birth of the Italian Republic. This is the second time that tenor Andrea Bocelli has sung the national anthem, but the first time it has been sung before the parade. This is the first time that the "SÌ" (Yes) has not been mentioned at the end of the national anthem since the decision to adopt the original version and it is the first time that military chaplains participate in the parade. The Italian Army paratrooper with the 400 m2 Italian flag, it was not carried out due to strong winds |
