= Alipore Jail Press =

Government printing press in West Bengal, India

Alipore Jail Press is situated inside the Alipore Correctional Home, Alipore. It is run by the Press and Forms Department, Government of West Bengal and employs the convicts of the Alipore Correctional Home and paid-hands for skilled labour that cannot be provided by the inmates. The press, in its present state, prints all government forms to its capacity and other miscellaneous sanctioned by the government. The press does not operate for any private or profit-making enterprise.

As per the Annual Report on the Administration of the Bengal Presidency in 1865, the press employed 269 prisoners and had an annual earning of Rs. 2,20, 643.

== Early history ==
The press did not originate in its current location. In fact, the government under the British had no plans to construct a press at all had it not been for the efforts of Dr. Frederic J. Mouat, the newly appointed Inspector-General of Jails. Till 1857 the chief view of the administration concerning the labour in jails was penal and utilitarian – the convicts were deemed to be the worst characters and therefore only rigorous work could be suitable for them and as a mode of payment for their sustenance in the jails. However, Dr. Mouat, after a Jail Exhibition in 1857 of the Bareilly Jail, became determined to introduce a print industry to print his own circulars and additionally make the jails a profit-making machine for the State in the troubled times after the Mutiny.

Within a year, the press was formed in order to decrease the expense and delay incurred in printing and lithographing circulars, forms, etc., for the Jail Department. The small experimental organization proved to be so successful and efficient that soon Dr. Mouat proposed to extend it with the object of establishing a complete printing and lithographic establishment at Alipore to execute by their means all the Government work then performed elsewhere at considerable cost to the State. This proposal was immediately met with objection from men who thought the occupation too light for the convicts. After a long argument it was decided that neither Dr. Mouat nor those opposing him were entirely wrong and thus the government decided to ratify Dr. Mouat's proposal with a limitation that only the typographic department be extended so as to execute all the form work that is to be transferred from the Government Gazette Press and to add to it first rate lithographic presses and all other necessary machines. On 1 July 1858, the printing of all Bengal forms was, for the first time, undertaken by the Jail Department. The press began to print with varying degrees of considerable profit.

== After Mouat's retirement ==
In 1870, a memorable year in the history of Bengal Jails, Dr. Mouat retired after 15 years of office. His retirement was seized upon by those who opposed him to reverse his policy and that which Dr. Mouat had so strived to eradicate soon took precedence over printing. The reformatory and educational endeavours were replaced with the penal effects of the tread-mill, the crank and the lash. The other notable change was the transfer of the Forms-store from the Stationery office to Alipore Jail at the recommendation of the committee of 1869. However, with the decline of the press, the grounds on which the transfer was made proved to be fallacious and in 1876 it was re-transferred to its original location. The setback of the press affected the government acutely and it soon sought to transfer the whole press to the Presidency Jail, on the Maidan, the insignificant miscellaneous manufactures were discontinued in favour of a concentration of almost all the printing of the Bengal Government. It thus became possible to transfer the greater part of the printing apparatus from the Secretariat Press and give employment to between 600 and 700 prisoners in all branches of printing and book-binding.

Being an extension of the Secretariat Press it began to undertake more varied work much of which was unsuitable for the convicts and soon an entirely separate Paid-Division unit was constructed. The jail department's interest in the press waned and in 1906 special committee decided to amalgamate the Forms department with the press under a common Press and Forms manager independent of the Superintendent of Government Printing and subject to the direct control of the Jail Department. Two committees in 1908 and 1909 sat to decide what work should be done at the jail Press and what at the Secretariat Press. The final arrangements included the abolition of the Paid-Division of the Jail Press.

== Amalgamation of the Press and Forms Department ==
On 6 April 1908, Mr. John Grey, the first Press and Forms Manager took over the charge of the Jail Press. The press was once more a jail industry. The new Alipore Jail, the now Alipore Correctional Home, was opened and though far from being complete, a small book-binding unit was opened from which the existing press sprung up. The old Presidency Jail on the Maidan was closed on 30 October 1913 under Govt. Notification. The Alipore Central Jail became the Presidency Jail, Calcutta, and the new Alipore Jail became the Central Jail or as it is now known as The Alipore Correctional home, Alipore. On 1 April 1914, the Dacca Press ceased to exist and all the responsibility was taken over by the Alipore Jail Press. About the same time the Forms Department migrated from its temporary home at Dallanda to a new block at Judges' Court Road opposite the jail. On 1 August 1914, the amalgamation of the Press and Forms Department became an established fact. The Forms-store was transferred from the Stationery Department a second time after 1870 but this time outside the jail connected by tramway lines where it still stands to this day.

The press by 1915-16 was replete with every modern machinery and convenience and employed 900 convicts. It remained basically a letterpress unit consisting of flat-bed machines, heavy treadle machines, high speed rotary machine. Later automatic HMT and Rehnus machines were introduced.

== The press today ==
The year 1995 saw a spurt of modernization and sophisticated shift-fed offset machines, plate-making machines, DTP and finally web-offset machines were introduced. Modern binding machines including loose-leaf binding machine, sewing machines, fully automatic paper-cutting machine were also installed.

Paper is supplied from the Commerce and Industries Department and the press is equipped to print 10,000 standard and 2000 non-standard forms. The press also prints a magazine called Nabark, the first edition of which came out in 1995. It is a magazine written by the inmates and employees of the jail and is a first of its kind in India. The press has also printed a pamphlet called Metamorphosis, which chronicles the chief events of the jail. All profits made from the press are donated to the Prisoners' Welfare Fund.
