= Rashid Talaa =

Prime minister of Transjordan

- رشيد طليع
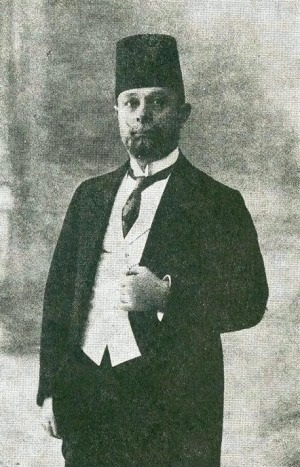

1st Minister of Interior of Syria
- In office 30 September 1918 – 8 March 1920
- Preceded by: office established
- Succeeded by: Reda Al Solh

1st Prime Minister of Transjordan
- In office 11 April 1921 – 5 August 1921
- Monarch: King Abdullah I
- Preceded by: office established
- Succeeded by: Mazhar Raslan

Personal details
- Born: Rashid Ali Hussein Nassif Talaa; 1877 Ottoman Empire
- Died: 17 September 1926 (aged 48–49) Shbeiki, State of Syria
- Party: Independent

Rashid Talaa (Arabic: رشيد طليع; 1877 – 17 September 1926) was a Jordanian politician of Lebanese Druze descent. He was the first Prime Minister of Transjordan from 11 April 1921 to 5 August 1921.

He participated in the Great Syrian Revolt against the French authorities in 1925, until he was killed on 17 September 1926 in Shbeiki, Jabal Druze, where he was also buried and had a memorial there.

== Biography ==
Talaa was born to a Druze family in 1877 in Lebanon. He studied at the Istanbul University, then held several senior positions, in which he became the mutasarrif of Hauran, Tripoli and Latakia. He established a committee in Jerusalem along with Adil Arslan and Fouad Slim to support the Egyptian Revolution of 1919. Upon the conclusion of the First World War, he joined King Faisal I in Damascus, based on the recommendations of Muhammad Yusuf al-Shurayqi. He was later appointed a military governor in Hama.

Afterwards, he became the first Minister of Interior in Syria from 30 September 1918 to 8 March 1920. He then became a governor in Aleppo, before the Battle of Maysalun. He left Syria to the Emirate of Transjordan, in which he became the first Prime Minister on 11 April until 23 June 1921, during the reign of Abdullah I, then for a second tenure from 5 July to 5 August 1921, in which his premiership was dissolved due to pressure from the British authorities. He participated in the Great Syrian Revolt against the French authorities in 1925, until he was killed on 17 September 1926 in Shbeiki, Jabal Druze, where he was also buried and had a memorial there.

== See also ==
- List of prime ministers of Jordan
