= Charu Chandra Bose =

Bengali revolutionary (1912–1934)

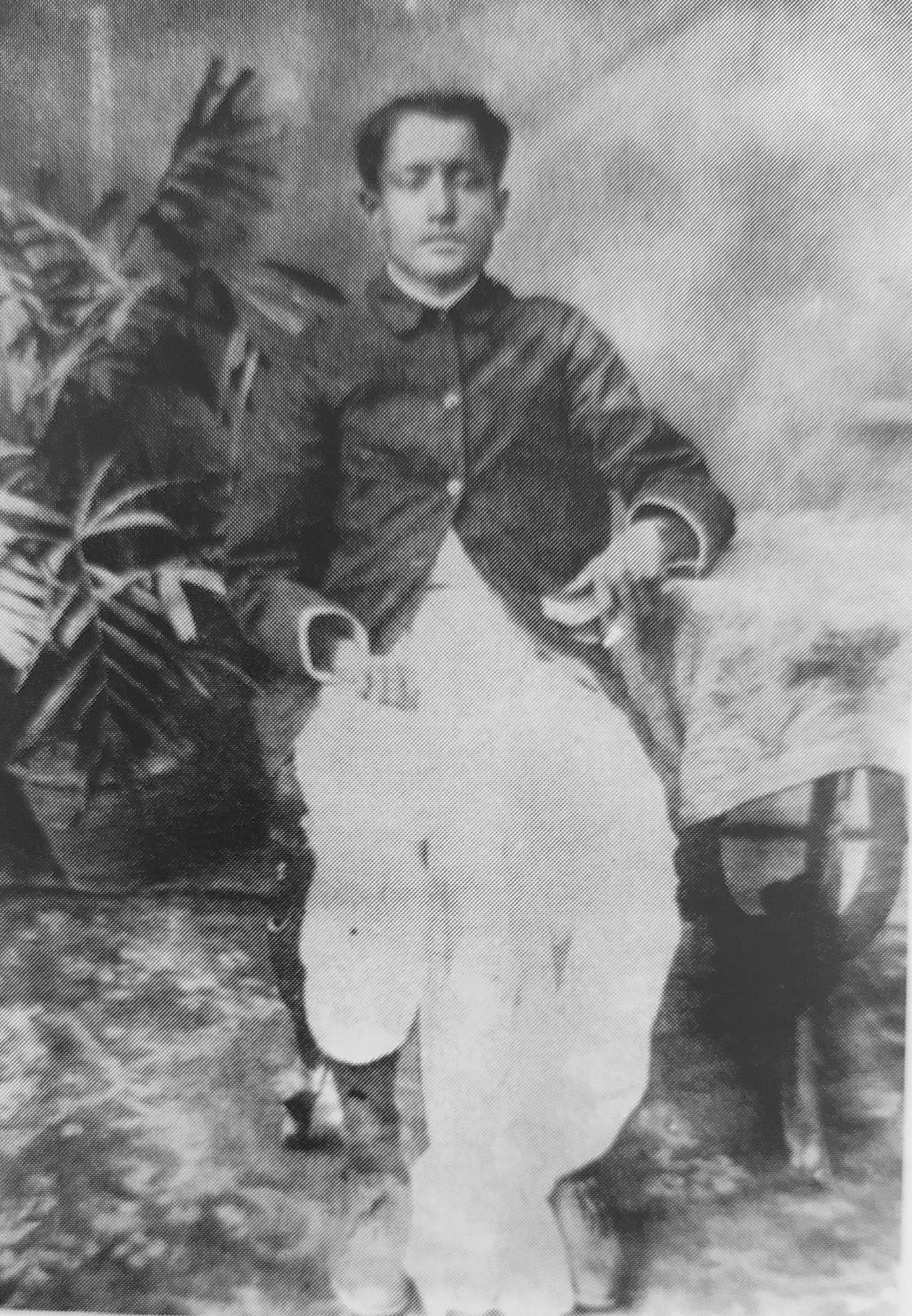
- Born: 26 February 1890; Shobhana village, Khulna, British India
- Died: 19 March 1909 (aged 19); Alipore Jail, Calcutta, Bengal Presidency, British India (now in India)
- Cause of death: Execution by hanging
- Occupation: Revolutionary
- Organization: Anushilan Samiti
- Movement: Indian Freedom Movement

Charu Chandra Bose (misspelled in WB Correctional services record as Charu Charan Bose; 26 February 1890 – 19 March 1909) was an Indian revolutionary and member of the Anushilan Samiti who carried out assassinations against British colonial officials in an attempt to secure Indian independence. He was hanged on 19 March 1909 for the charge of assassination of Ashutosh Biswas a notorious Public Prosecutor who was responsible for the conviction of many revolutionaries in the Muraripukur Bomb case and many other false cases shortly after the Anti-Partition Movement.

== Family ==
Charu Chandra Bose was born at the Shobhana village in the district of Khulna now in Bangladesh on 26 February 1890. His father was Keshab Chandra Bose. He did not have the palm of his right hand from birth.

== Revolutionary activities ==
Charu Chandra Bose lived at 130, russa road in Talligange for 12 years. He worked at various presses and newspapers for his living in Kolkata and Howrah. He joined Anushilan Samiti, a revolutionary organisation of British India. He also associated with Yugantar, an organisation known for its revolutionary exploits. A notorious Public Prosecutor Ashutosh Biswas was responsible for the conviction of many revolutionaries in the Muraripukur bomb case. Biswas also dealing with many other false cases shortly after the Anti-Partition Movement in Bengal. He also actively helped in collecting evidence in different way and arranging papers and witnesses to ensure punishment of many revolutionaries in Muraripur Bomb case. According to a secret plan Ashutosh Biswas was shot dead by Charu Chandra Bose on 10 February 1909. On the various day Charu Chandra tied the revolver tightly to his crippled hand and covered it under a shawl. He find him and shot him within point-blank range in the afternoon. Charu Chandra Bose was arrested by a constable.

== Death ==
He died on the gallows in Alipore Central Jail on 19 March 1909.
