= Elmer H. Inman =

American bank robber, jewel thief and outlaw

- Born: 1880; Kansas, United States
- Died: November 19, 1955 (aged 75); Project City, California
- Spouse: Lavona Codding (August – November 1921)
- Status: Paroled in 1921; Released in 1926; Paroled in 1932
- Convictions: Armed robbery (1917); Car theft and mail fraud (1921); Burglary (1926)
- Penalty: 10 years imprisonment; 5 years imprisonment; 7 years imprisonment

Elmer H. Inman (1880 – June 11, 1939) was an American criminal, bank robber, jewel thief and Depression-era outlaw. At one time considered Oklahoma's "Public Enemy No. 1", he was a member of the Kimes-Terrill Gang and associated with Herman Barker and Wilbur Underhill, Jr. throughout the early-1930s.

== Biography ==
=== Early life and marriage ===
Elmer Inman was born in Kansas in 1880. He received his first major criminal conviction for his participation in a jewelry heist in Arkansas City and was sentenced to serve at least 10 years in Leavenworth Penitentiary. Once inside, he managed to get into the good graces of Warden J.K. Codding and his family. Inman was able to convince the warden he had been "jobbed" for the robbery and eventually became his chauffeur. Inman was also wonderfully attentive to the warden's sickly wife and began a romantic relationship with his daughter Lavona. The two were married in August 1921, shortly after Inman's parole.

While Lavona petitioned the state of Kansas to pardon her husband however, Inman was arrested for stealing a car in Oklahoma and was sent back to Leavenworth. It was also discovered around this time that Inman had been selling stolen jewelry throughout his time as an inmate and was charged with using the prison mail to defraud. On November 8, 1921, his marriage to Lavona was annulled on the grounds that, while a convicted felon, his marriage could not be recognized by the state.

=== Partnership with Herman Barker and Ray Terrill ===
Finally released in 1926, Inman remained in Kansas despite his past trouble with the law. On June 7, he was arrested with Herman Barker while driving a stolen car in Fort Scott. While in custody, it was discovered that Inman was wanted for the robbery of a bank and post office in Ketchum, Oklahoma. Before he could be extradited, Inman was released on bail and left the state. He was arrested a few days later with Ray Terrill for a burglary in Ardmore, Oklahoma.

On September 27, he and Terrill overpowered a guard in the Carter County jail and escaped. Two months later, he was suspected in participating in the Sallisaw break out of Matthew Kimes by Herman Barker and Ray Terrill on November 9, 1926. At the time of his escape, Kimes was appealing his 35-year sentence for robbery and murder.

=== Kimes-Terrill Gang ===
Following the jail break of Matthew Kimes, Inman became a regular member of the Kimes-Terrill Gang. Arrested for burglarizing an Oklahoma City store on December 27, 1926, he was convicted and sentenced to 7 years imprisonment on February 9, 1927. While being transported to McAlester, Inman escaped from custody near Bolton and soon rejoined the gang.

After a near-5 month crime spree across Kansas and Oklahoma, Kimes and gang member Raymond Doolin were arrested at the Grand Canyon in June. Inman and Terrill hid in Arkansas for a few months until their arrest in Hot Springs on November 26, 1927, and were extradited back to face authorities in Oklahoma. By the end of the year, they were back in McAlester where the two were reunited with Matthew and George Kimes.

=== Inman and the "Tri-State Terror" Wilbur Underhill ===
Though Kimes and Terrill would remain in prison, Inman would be released on parole by the early 1930s. He may have been involved with the Barker-Karpis Gang during 1932 and 1933, especially due to his former association with Herman Barker, but by late-1933 he had aligned himself with Wilbur Underhill, Jr. and his mob.

Together they tried to seal a safe from a Harrah bank on December 12, 1933, but it ended up falling through the weak floorboards and into the basement. The next day, Inman was named as one of two unidentified men who stole $4,000 from a bank in Coalgate. Underhill was mortally wounded when police stormed his honeymoon cottage on December 30, 1933, and died at the prison hospital in McAlester on January 6, 1934. Inman was arrested a day later when police spotted him at a gas station in Bowlegs, Oklahoma, and was injured while resisting arrest; his girlfriend Lena Nichols was also arrested. Returned to McAlester. Inman was paroled in 1939 and relocated to Medford, Oregon. He was killed in a car crash at Project City, California, on November 18, 1955, and buried in Redding, California.
