= Anantahari Mitra =

Bengali Indian independence movement activist (1906–1926)

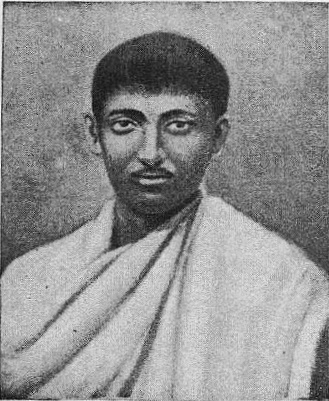
- Born: 1906; Begampur, Chuadanga District, British India
- Died: September 28, 1926 (aged 19–20); Alipore Jail, Kolkata, British India
- Occupation: Indian independence movement activist
- Criminal charges: Killing of Bhupen Chatterjee
- Criminal penalty: Sentenced to death

Anantahari Mitra (1906 – September 28, 1926) was a Bengali Indian independence movement activist.

== Early life ==
Anantahari, the son of Ramlal Mitra, was born in Baaganchra village, Shantipur, Nadia District in British India. He received a student scholarship and went to Chattagram. After his Matriculation from Mymensingh, he shifted to Bangabasi College, Calcutta, for further studies.

== Revolutionary activities ==
In the wake of the Non-cooperation movement, Anantahari left his studies and became a whole-time Congress worker, spinning Charkha, weaving and selling khaddar, and agitating for the boycott of foreign goods. After that Mitra, met with nationalist revolutionary poet Bijaylal Chattopadhyay and came to Krishnanagar, Nadia where he met with leaders of the Indian National Congress. In 1924, Mitra actively took part in revolutionary freedom struggle and left for Daksineswar. Police raided his residence at Daksineswar on 10 November 1925 and arrested Mitra along with other activists. He was sent to prison in 1926 for his connection with the Daksineswar Conspiracy Case.

== Death ==
Mitra and his partners killed Bhupen Chatterjee, an infamous deputy superintendent of police of the Intelligence Branch because he frequently met revolutionary prisoners to exact information. For this, Mitra was sentenced to death. On 28 September 1926, Mitra and Pramod Ranjan Choudhury were hanged at Alipore Jail, Kolkata.
