= Alipore Central Jail =

Jail in Kolkata, India

Alipore Jail
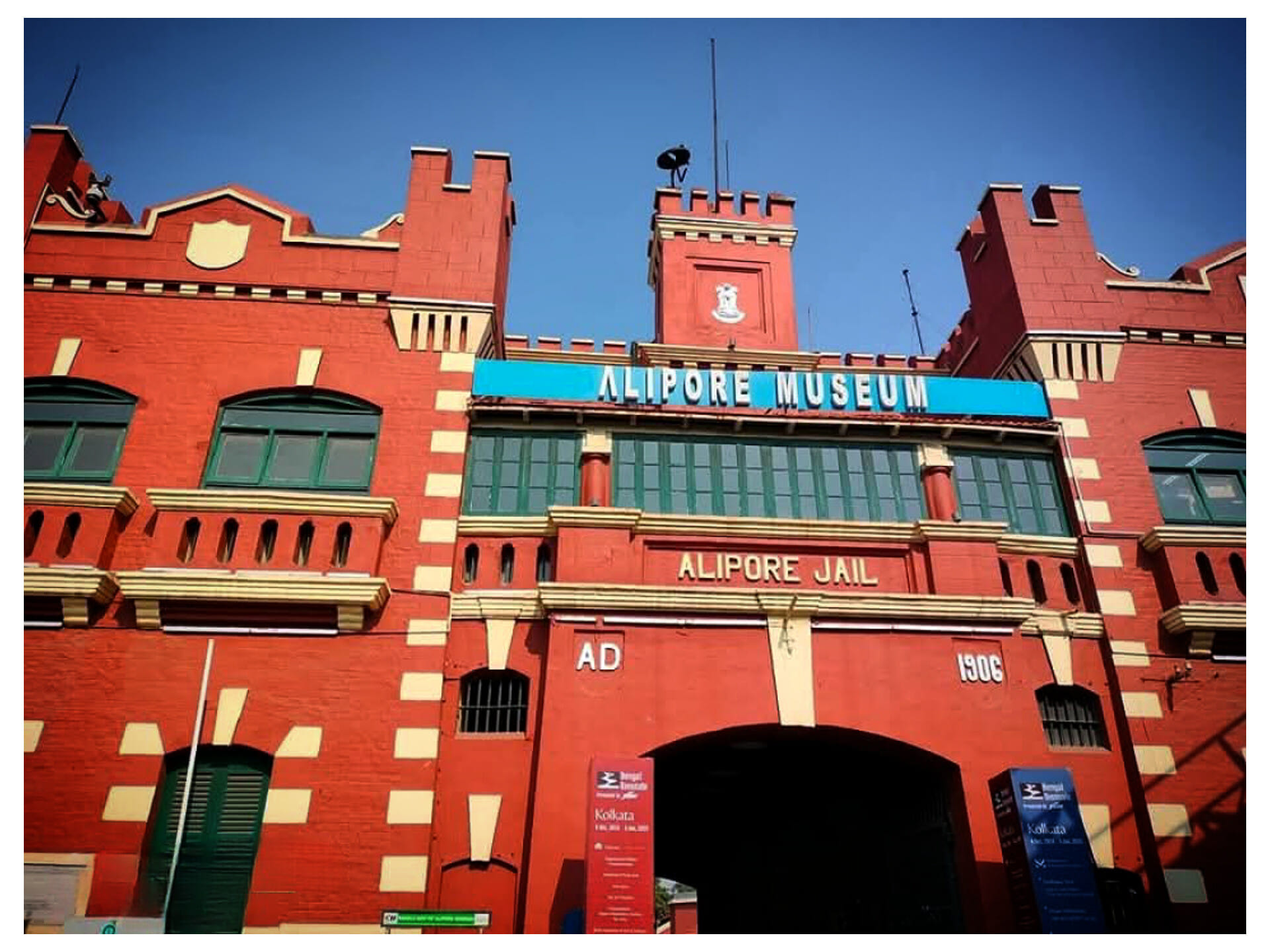
- Interactive map of Alipore Jail
- Location: Alipore, Kolkata; 22.525275°N 88.339866°E
- Status: Open
- Security class: Maximum
- Capacity: 2000
- Opened: 1864; 162 years ago
- Former name: Old Alipore Jail
- Website: http://independencemuseum.in/

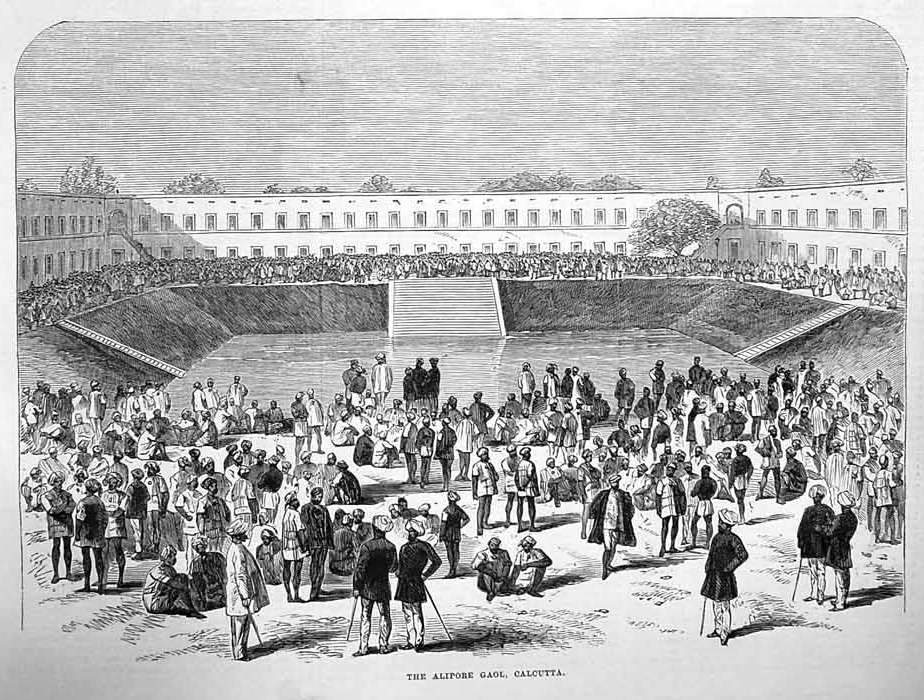
The Alipore Gaol, Calcutta; in 1870

The Alipore Jail or Alipore Central Jail, also known as Presidency Correctional Home, is a defunct Indian prison in Alipore, Kolkata, where political prisoners were kept under British rule. It also housed the Alipore Jail Press. It is no longer in operation as a jail, having been shut down on 20 February 2019. The jail site has been now developed into an independence museum in memory of the martyrs who were imprisoned and executed there.

== Notable inmates ==
- Sri Aurobindo (May 1908 – May 1909), imprisoned after the Alipore bomb case. During his stay, he wrote a series of articles in Bengali, in the journal Suprabhat, later published as Tales of Prison Life. He later said, "I have spoken of a year's imprisonment. It would have been more appropriate to speak of a year's living in an ashram or a hermitage. The only result of the wrath of the British Government was that I found God."
- Dudu Miyan (1857–61)
- Subhas Chandra Bose
- Hemchandra Kanungo
- Kanailal Dutta
- Satyendra Nath Bosu
- Gopinath Saha
- Ananta Hari Mitra
- Dinesh Gupta
- Birendranath Sasmal
- Jawaharlal Nehru
- K. Kamaraj (1930)
- Ramakrishna Biswas
- Bidhan Chandra Roy (1930)
- Parul Mukherjee (1930s)
- Charu Mazumdar
- Pramod Ranjan Choudhury (1926)
- Dr. Jack Preger, MBE (1981)
- P. Kakkan
- Charu Chandra Bose

== Alipore Jail Museum ==
The defunct Alipore Jail has been transformed into a museum, maintained by the West Bengal Housing Infrastructure Development Corporation (WBHIDCO). It was inaugurated and opened to the public in September 2022. Various prison cells and gallows of notable inmates have been curated for visitors to preserve the memory of those individuals who lost their lives for India to gain its independence. The museum project can broadly be categorised into ten parts: gallows, watchtowers, special cells, general cells, detention cells, jail canteen, jail hospital, hospital building exhibition, segregation ward, and an art studio. Apart from these diverse presentations, the museum has an INA-themed food court, a souvenir shop, and "a light and sound show" dedicated to informing the visitor about the struggles and hardships endured by the freedom fighters. There is an exclusive exhibition in the museum dedicated to Subhas Chandra Bose.

As of February 2023, the Police Museum Kolkata has also been shifted within the premises of the Alipore Jail Museum from the Acharya Prafulla Chandra Roy Road location in Kolkata.
