= Pramod Ranjan Choudhury =

Bengali activist for the Indian independence (1904–1926)

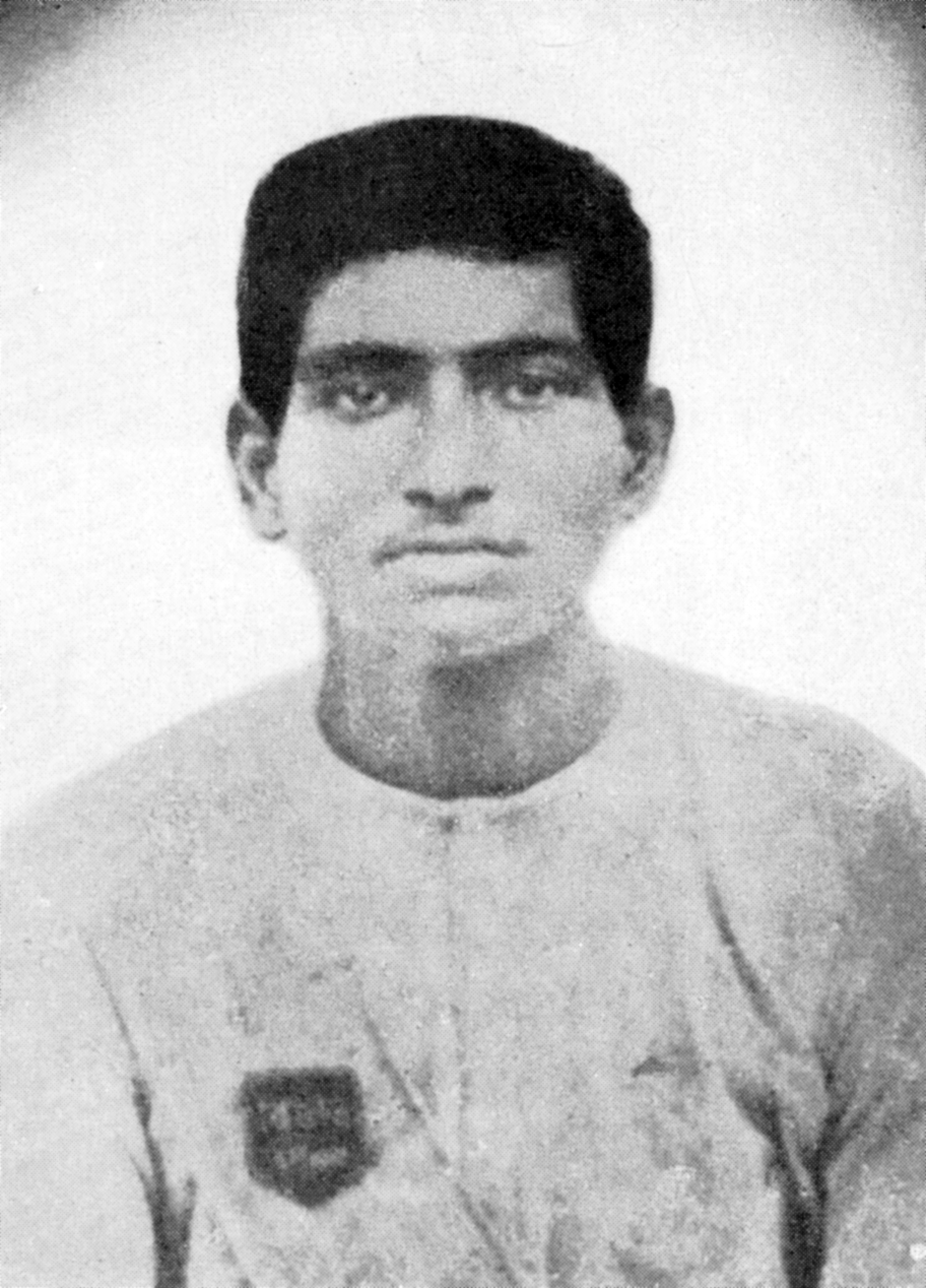
- revolutionary Pramod Ranjan Choudhury
- Born: 1904; Kelishahar, Patiya Upazila, Chittagong, British India
- Died: 28 September 1926 (aged 21–22); Alipore Jail, Kolkata
- Occupation: Bengali Indian independence movement activist
- Known for: Revolutionary
- Criminal charge: Assassination of Bhupen Chatterjee
- Criminal penalty: Capital punishment
- Criminal status: Executed
- Father: Ishan Chandra Choudhury

Pramod Ranjan Choudhury (1904 – 28 September 1926) was a Bengali revolutionary associated with the Anushilan Samiti and later Surya Sen’s group in the Indian independence movement. Born in Chittagong, he joined the revolutionary cause in 1920. Arrested in a police raid in 1925 at a Dakshineswar hideout, he was imprisoned for five years. While in Alipore jail, he and others killed Bhupendranath Chatterjee, a police intelligence officer. Unable to identify the killer, authorities tried all five accused. Pramod Ranjan and Anantahari Mitra were sentenced to death and executed on 28 September 1926 at Alipore Central Jail.

== Early life ==
Pramod Ranjan was born in Mahishya family at Kelishahar, Patiya Upazila, Chittagong District in British India. His father's name was Ishan Chandra Choudhury.

== Revolutionary activities ==
Choudhury joined the Anushilan Samiti group at Chattogram. In 1921 he took part in the non-cooperation movement. He was arrested at Dakshineswar for his connections with the Dakshineswar Conspiracy Case and sent to prison. On 28 May 1926 Choudhury and other fellow revolutionary inmates killed Bhupen Chatterjee with an iron rod. Chatterjee was a deputy superintendent of the Police Intelligence Branch who spied on inmates and tried to destroy the mental strength of political prisoners.

== Death ==
The trial of the killers began on 15 June 1926 and a sentence of capital punishment was handed down on 21 June. Choudhury and Anantahari Mitra were hanged on 28 September 1926 in the Alipore Central Jail in Kolkata.
