= San Vittore Prison =

Prison in the city center of Milan, Italy

San Vittore
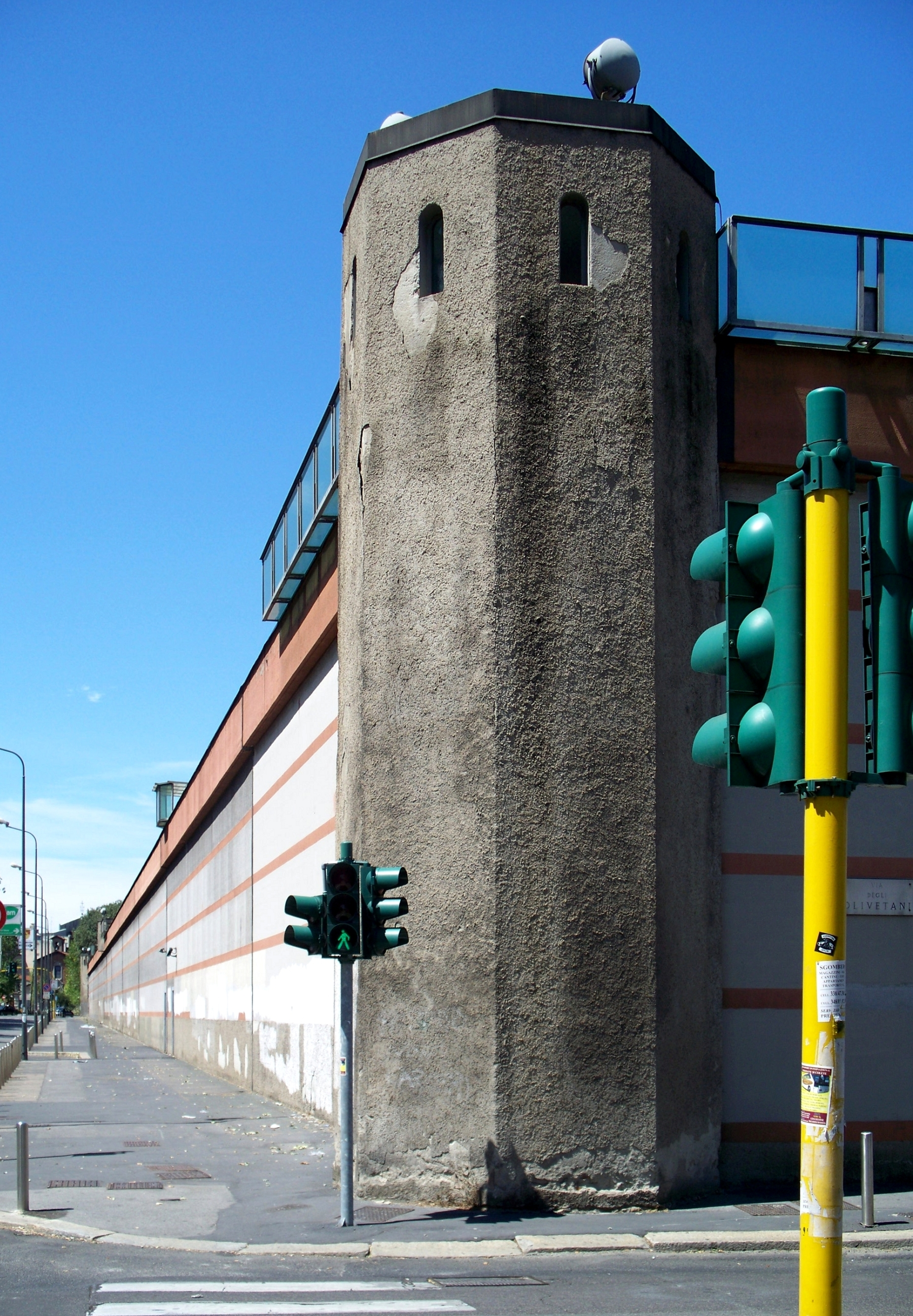
- San Vittore prison walls
- Interactive map of San Vittore
- Location: Milan, Lombardy, Italy
- Capacity: 702
- Population: 1104 (September 10, 2026)
- Opened: 7 July 1879

San Vittore, officially the Francesco Di Cataldo Circondarial House (Italian: Casa circondariale "Francesco Di Cataldo"), is a prison located in the city center of Milan, Italy, in piazza Gaetano Filangieri. Its construction started in 1872 and it was opened on 7 July 1879. It is named after Francesco Di Cataldo.

== History ==
The construction of the new prison was decided after the Italian unification, together with other infrastructure improvement works in Milan in the period between the unification and the city's first town plan of 1889. Until then, were detained in several other structures not designed as prisons, among them the former Sant'Antonio Abate convent, in the Courthouse and in the former San Vittore convent.

For the construction of the new structure the government acquired terrains in the outskirts of the city, in a sparsely developed area at that time. The building, designed by the engineer Francesco Lucca, takes inspiration from the 18th century Panopticon, with 6 wings with three floors each. The perimeter walls were originally built in medieval style, but they have almost all been rebuilt with modern standards for security reasons.

=== Fascist occupation ===
During Fascism occupation the San Vittore Prison was used as a house for every enemy (political or war enemy). Since Germans took over the power in Italy, in 1943, a lot of changes happened in the prison, until the big riots happened in April 1946.

=== German occupation ===
During the German occupation in World War II (1943 – 1945) the prison was partly subject to German jurisdiction, with the SS in control of one of the wings. The prison gained notoriety during the war through the inhumane treatment of inmates by the SS guards and the torture carried out there. On 10 August 1944 15 captured partisans held at the prison, hand picked by Theo Saevecke, head of the Gestapo in Milan, were publicly executed at Piazzale Loreto and left on display, as a reprisal for a partisan attack on a German military convoy.

The prisons served as a way station for Jews arrested in northern Italy, which would be brought to San Vittore Prison and, from there, to Milano Centrale railway station, from where they would be loaded into freight cars on a secret track underneath the station.

=== 2020 riot ===
On March 9, 2020, inmates climbed onto the roofs and set fire to cells during protests against the suspension of family visits, ordered to contain the COVID-19 pandemic.

The protest at San Vittore was part of unrest that affected almost 50 Italian prisons in early March 2020 and left 13 detainees dead and 59 officers injured, the deaths being attributed by the authorities to overdoses after inmates raided prison pharmacies. Human Rights Watch noted that the Italian prison system was at the time 120 per cent over capacity, holding 61,230 inmates in 50,931 available places.

== Capacity and overcrowding ==
As of September 10, 2026 the prison held 1,104 inmates against 702 regulation places, 218 of which were listed as unavailable, according to the Department of Penitentiary Administration of the Ministry of Justice. The women's section, which is part of the same institution, held 94 inmates against 46 regulation places.

The women's section became one of the most crowded in Italy after the women's wing of the prison of Vigevano was closed in the summer of 2025 and its inmates moved to other institutions in Lombardy; in August 2026 the newspaper Il Giorno put its occupancy above 200 per cent, citing figures collected by the prison monitoring Antigone Association.

== Notable inmates ==
- Mike Bongiorno, television host. Detained for 7 months in 1943 before being transferred to Mauthausen concentration camp.
- Indro Montanelli, journalist and historian, shared prison cell with Bongiorno.
- Gaetano Bresci, anarchist, detained from 29 July to 5 November 1900.
- Renato Vallanzasca, Italian criminal.
- Fabrizio Corona, television personality.
- Patrizia Reggiani, ex-wife of Maurizio Gucci.
- Dorothy Gibson, American actress and Titanic survivor; escaped the prison with Montanelli and General Bartolo Zambon
- Antonio Gramsci, Italian Marxist intellectual.

== Bibliography ==
- Chiara Bricarelli (a cura di), Una gioventù offesa. Ebrei genovesi ricordano
- Luigi Borgomaneri, Hitler a Milano: crimini di Theodor Saevecke capo della Gestapo, Roma, Datanews, 1997.
- E. Grottanelli, L'amministrazione comunale di Milano e la costruzione del carcere di San Vittore, in "Storia in Lombardia," quadrimestrale dell'Istituto lombardo per la storia del movimento di liberazione in Italia, Milano, Franco Angeli Editore, anno IV, n. 2, 1985.
- Antonio Quatela, "Sei petali di sbarre e cemento", Mursia Editore, Milano, 2013.
