= Pabst Mine disaster =

Coordinates: 46°27′26″N 90°8′21″W

The Pabst Mine disaster was an incident that occurred on September 24, 1926, at the Pabst Iron Mine in Ironwood, Michigan, United States, when a mine shaft containing 46 iron ore miners unexpectedly collapsed. Three miners were killed in the initial collapse, while 43 survivors were left trapped for 129 hours. The subsequent rescue of the trapped miners, with the last miner removed from the rubble at 11.22 p.m. on the fifth day, made national headlines in the United States.

== Background ==
The Pabst mine was named after the Milwaukee brewer Frederick Pabst, who owned the mining lease briefly in the late 19th century. It passed through a number of corporate owners before being purchased by the Oliver Iron Mining Company, which became a subsidiary of the United States Steel Corporation in 1901. Three years later, the company added another shaft to the mine, named "G" shaft, which would become one of their most productive. This new shaft was dug on a sixty-four degree incline towards the north, and was 10 feet (3.0 m) by 18 feet 8 inches. It descended nearly 2,600 feet (790 m) through quartz slate and, for safety, its walls were lined with concrete and wood planks held in place with steel. The mine elevator that was installed on rails along one of its walls could travel as fast as 1,000 feet (300 m) per minute.

The area around Ironwood, Michigan had received significant rainfall throughout September 1926. A source claims that as much as 11 inches of rain fell prior to the mine disaster on September 24. The rains were so intense that the county fair closed early, a local river flooded, high school football games were canceled, and work came to a halt on local building projects. Some of this rain would likely have run down the mine shaft and seeped into cracks along its length.

After the accident, mine employees claimed that there had been a series of problems with the shaft before the collapse. On a number of occasions the shaft walls bowed out due to settling in the rock, bending the rails upon which the mine elevator rode. When this happened, the elevator would derail, damaging the steel sets that held the concrete and wood planks lining the walls. Repairs would quickly be done, and the shaft would again enter operation.

== Collapse ==
On September 24, 1926, 43 men were inside the mine, and three electricians began traveling down the shaft in the elevator. Sources disagree whether it was a failure of the elevator or the result of falling rock, but in either case the elevator fell down the shaft, killing its three occupants. A rock fall then sealed the shaft above the eighth level of the mine, trapping 40 miners there, two on the 13th and another on the 18th.

The miners, now trapped and unsure when and if help would arrive, attempted to ration the remaining food from their lunches. However, the food ran out before the second day, and the only nourishment they had left was tea they made from birch bark scraped from the wooden planks lining the mine walls and heated with the miners' carbide lamps.

== Rescue ==
Soon after the collapse, a miner named Alfred Maki descended the shaft and heard signals from the men trapped inside. Over the next five days, rescuers began digging from the neighboring "H" shaft to try to reach the trapped miners. They descended first to nearly the bottom of "H" shaft, where a tunnel connected the two shafts, and then began working their way up the ladderway of "G" shaft. On the fifth day, they were able to reach the trapped miners. According to news reports, the first rescuer to reach them asked what they wanted most, and when they replied that they wanted tobacco, he supplied them with a cigar.

When news reached Ironwood that the miners had been found, much of the population rushed to the mine, including families of the trapped miners. As many as 5,000 people were waiting at the top of the shaft when the miners came in small groups up the elevator in "H" shaft. The miners, who had been trapped in the mine for 129 hours, were transported to a local hospital before being released. The story of the rescue made newspaper headlines across the country.

== Commemoration ==
Residents of the area have established an organization to advocate for the establishment of a Miners Memorial Heritage Park. This organization continues to honor the memory of the mine disaster.

== See also ==
- Barnes-Hecker Mine Disaster
