= Kimes–Terrill Gang =

American criminal gang

Kimes-Terrill Gang
- Founded: 1926
- Founded by: Matthew Kimes and Ray Terrill
- Founding location: Oklahoma
- Years active: 1926-1927
- Territory: Midwestern United States
- Membership (est.): 9
- Criminal activities: Bank robbery

The Kimes–Terrill Gang was a prohibition era bank robbing gang, led by Matthew Kimes and Ray Terrill, active in the Midwestern United States during the 1920s. The gang was known, not only for their high-profile robberies, but for their frequent escapes from prison. The members were alleged to have sworn a blood oath to free each other from jail, should they ever be captured, or die in the attempt.

== History ==
=== Terrill and the Central Park Gang ===
Ray Terrill began working with the famed Central Park Gang based in Tulsa, Oklahoma during the early 1920s. Many future Depression-era outlaws came from this group, most prominently, Volney Davis and the Barker Gang. Then using the alias "G.R. Patton", he was arrested with Arthur Barker while burglarizing a bank in Muskogee, Oklahoma on January 15, 1921. He was convicted of second-degree burglary and sentenced to two years in prison. Upon his release on March 1, 1923, Terrill joined up with Al Spencer's gang and participated in the March 26 bank robbery in Mannford which left two people killed during the getaway and shootout. He was also part of Spencer's team, which included Frank Nash among others, that stole $20,000 in cash and bonds from the Katy Limited near Okesa on August 20, 1923. This was the last recorded train robbery in the state's history.

After Spencer was killed by police a month later, Terrill formed his own gang. Some of his earliest recruits were Herman Barker, Wilbur Underhill and Elmer H. Inman. His gang specialized in night burglaries of banks and stores with a unique method of raiding their targets. Using stolen trucks, they extracted the safes and drove them to Herman Barker's home at Radium Springs Health Resort near Salina, Oklahoma. Once there, the safes would be unlocked by safe crackers and emptied, then driven out to a nearby bridge at night where they would be dumped.

Terrill and his gang operated for three years until he and Inman were arrested for burglary in Ardmore in 1926. They were both convicted and sentenced to years each, but escaped from prison together on September 27, 1926. The two went their separate ways after escaping and Terrill set out to form his gang again.

=== Partnership with the Kimes Brothers ===
George and Matthew Kimes robbed their first bank together in Depew, Oklahoma on June 30, 1926, Matt having escaped from jail in Bristow the previous day. Only three months before Kimes escaped from prison, the brothers went on a brief crime spree of their own before meeting up with Kimes. On August 20, they stole $5,000 from a bank in Beggs and led a gang which simultaneously raided two banks in Covington six days later.

The Kimes brothers were confronted by police in Sallisaw on August 27. A shootout occurred which resulted in the death of Deputy Perry Chuculate and the kidnapping of the police chief and another hostage as they attempted to flee to Arkansas. They were trapped by authorities near Rudy the next day, holding out at the home of their cousin Ben Pixley, and surrendered to police after both were wounded in a second gunfight. George Kimes was sentenced to 25 years for bank robbery and sent to McAlester state penitentiary while Matthew was given 30 years for the death of police officer Perry Chuculate.

On November 21, 1926, Terrill led a raid on the Sallisaw jail with Herman Barker and Elmer Inman and broke out their newest recruit, Matthew Kimes. The gang's first robbery occurred on January 10, 1927, when Kimes, Terrill and Barker stole $42,950 from a bank in Sapulpa, Oklahoma. A week later, the three men were caught by police burglarizing a bank with two others in Joplin, Missouri. The gang fled into getaway cars and split up during the police chase. Matt Kimes and the two unknown men escaped into Kansas after a high-speed pursuit. Terrill and Barker however were followed to a house in Carterville where, after Barker was wounded in a shootout with police, the outlaws surrendered.

=== Final years and imprisonment ===
Terrill was not brought to trial for this recent crime spree and instead was to be returned to prison and complete his 1926 prison sentence. On January 19, 1927, while being transferred to McAlester however, he escaped from custody leaping from a moving police car and fled on foot. He rejoined Kimes in another series of bank robberies.

On May 27, Terrill was named by authorities as the prime suspect in a daylight bank robbery in McCune, Kansas in which $207,000 was stolen. Two days later, Kimes and Terrill returned to Beggs, Oklahoma with nine other gunmen and looted two banks of $18,000. Marshal W.J. McAnally was gunned down in the street while attempting to stop one of the robberies. The third bank was not robbed due to the outside bank clock being a few minutes off from the other banks' clocks.

This was the gang's last robbery as, on June 24, Matt Kimes and Raymond Doolin were arrested in Arizona near the Grand Canyon. Returned to Oklahoma, Kimes was sentenced to life imprisonment for his role in the murder of W.J. McAnally. Terrill and Inman were arrested in Hot Springs, Arkansas on November 26, 1927, and was also sent to McAlester where the Kimes brothers were also held.

Ray Terrill died in prison, but Kimes eventually escaped from McAlester. He was able to obtain a six-day leave of absence, with the help of influential friends, and released to go quail hunting with his lawyer on November 26, 1934. He was given another leave in November 1945, but chose to escape and robbed a bank in Morton, Texas. A warrant was made out for his arrest, however Kimes was run down by a poultry truck in North Little Rock on December 1, 1945. As described in the book The Mother, the Son and the Socialite, Kimes admitted himself to the hospital under the alias Leo A Woods where a swarm of FBI agents apprehended him the following day. His condition continued to decline over the next 2 weeks due to complications resulting from the poultry truck accident. Kimes failed to respond to an operation to treat his injuries. He died on December 14, 1945, according to the Fort Smith Times and was buried in Van Buren, Crawford county, Arkansas near the graves of his parents.
