= Murder of Francesco Di Cataldo =

1978 murder in Italy

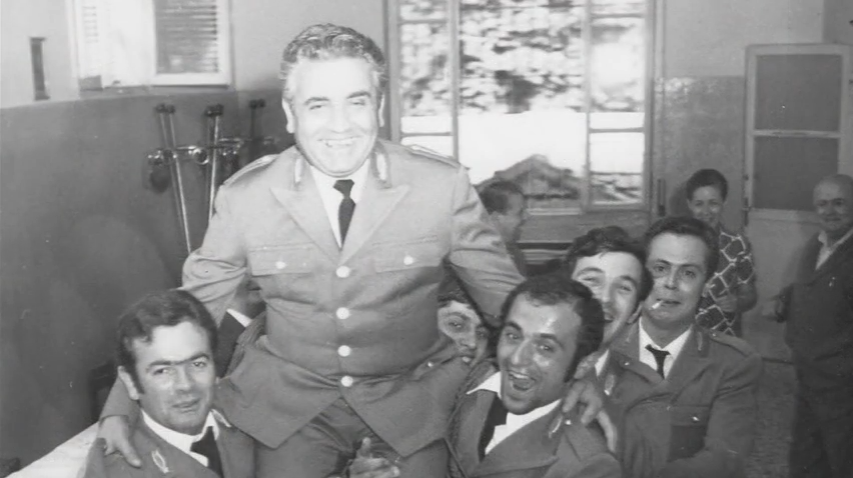
Major Marshal Francesco Di Cataldo with his colleagues in a happy moment.

The murder of Francesco Di Cataldo was committed in Milan, Italy, on 20 April 1978 by the Red Brigades.

== The victim ==
Di Cataldo, born in Barletta on 20 September 1926, was a major marshal of the Corpo degli Agenti di Custodia (the "Prison Guard Corps") who held the role of deputy commander in San Vittore Prison, Milan, and director of the clinical center of the same prison.

After three years spent training at the Military School of Custody Agents in Portici, in 1951 he was assigned to San Vittore Prison.

Here Di Cataldo proved to be a useful and dedicated man of dialogue and moderation, a believer in prison as a means of re-education of a prisoner. He made a career over the years until he reached the rank of Major Marshal and the position of Deputy Commander; due to his performance he was never transferred, as usually happened to the promoted rank.

Despite having received several threats since the mid-seventies, and despite his requests, Di Cataldo was never assigned an escort.

== The act ==
Early in the morning of April 20, 1978, just over a month after the kidnapping of Aldo Moro, Di Cataldo left his home in via Ponte Nuovo, in the suburban area of Crescenzago, Milan, to walk to the trolleybus stop and ride to the Milan Metro stop that would take him to Cadorna station, from where he would have reached the prison on foot. He was murdered by two terrorists with two gunshots to the head, four in the back and one in the left arm; two other terrorists were waiting in an automobile ready to flee.

Di Cataldo was married to Maria Violante and had two teenage children, Alberto and Paola.

== Claim and motives of the murder ==
Responsibility for the murder was claimed the same morning by the Walter Alasia Column of the Red Brigades with a phone call to the Milan editorial office of Agenzia Nazionale Stampa Associata (ANSA) about half an hour after the murder, on the grounds that Di Cataldo would have been a "torturer of detainees".

These statements were contradicted not only by Di Cataldo's colleagues and children, who emphasized the availability and democratic character of a well-liked Marshal respected by prisoners (even outside of work, with men released from prison who became attached to him visiting him at home), but also by the prisoners themselves, who were among the first to show condolences, even laying two wreaths of flowers at the funeral which were paid for with a collection, a gesture that had never happened before, and waving white handkerchiefs from the cells in his honor.

A possible explanation for the murder is that the Red Brigades wanted to interpret prison as a structure of torture and oppression by the State, and therefore wanted to hit those who, contradicting their theory by making the prison, instead, a state instrument of democracy and re-education.

== Aftermath ==
Francesco Di Cataldo rests in the cemetery of Lambrate, in Milan.

Those responsible for the murder were punished as part of a collective maxi-trial held in 1984 against 112 people linked to the Walter Alasia Column, which ended with a total of 19 life sentences, 840 years in prison and some acquittals; for some the penalties were subsequently reduced on appeal.

On 16 June 2004, Carlo Azeglio Ciampi, the President of Italy, posthumously awarded Di Cataldo the Gold Medal for Civil Valor, as a "shining example of chosen civic virtues and a very high sense of duty."

During the Feast of the Penitentiary Police on 24 October 2008, the "Conference Room" of the Polizia Penitenziaria inside San Vittore Prison was named after Major Marshal Di Cataldo. Subsequently the Casa Circondariale Milano San Vittore (the official name of San Vittore Prison) was named after him, and is now called Casa Circondariale Milano San Vittore "Francesco Di Cataldo" in his honor.

On 7 December 2010, the Comune of Milan, on the occasion of the annual city honors (popularly called Ambrogini d'Oro) granted to meritorious Milanese on the feast day of Ambrose, patron of the city, posthumously awarded Major Marshal Di Cataldo a Gold Medal of Civic Merit, with the following citation:

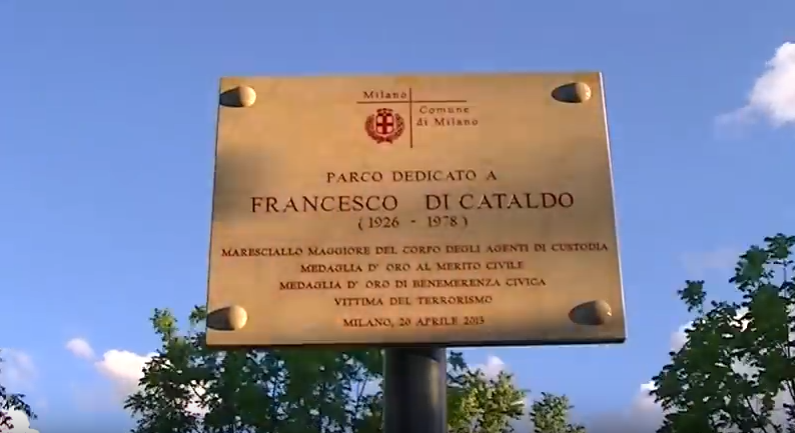
The sign dedicating Maresciallo Maggiore Francesco Di Cataldo Park.

MILANESE BY ADOPTION, HEROIC SERVANT OF THE STATE, FRANCESCO DI CATALDO HONORED FOR 28 YEARS THE CORPS OF CUSTODY AGENTS OF SAN VITTORE, UNTIL HE BECAME ITS DEPUTY COMMANDER. RESPONSIBLE FOR THE INTERNAL INFIRMARY, HE RESOLVED NUMEROUS PRISON REVOLTS WITH DIALOGUE AND MEDIATION, ALWAYS LOOKING WITH HUMANITY AT THE PRISONERS AND THEIR RIGHTS. HE WAS KILLED BY THE RED BRIGADES ON 20 APRIL 1978, DURING THE TRAGIC DAYS OF THE MORO KIDNAPPING.

On 20 April 2013, a city park near his home was named after him.

Also in 2013, his grandson, also named Francesco Di Cataldo, who had never been able to know his grandfather, made a short film entitled Per questo mi chiamo Francesco ("This is why my name is Francesco"). In the video, the young author imagines himself searching for his name on Google, urged by a friend who exhorts him saying "Come on Fra', let's see how famous you are on the internet!"; the young man instead finds news of the murder of the homonymous grandfather, investigates the reasons for the murder, documenting himself on the net, and interviewing his grandmother Maria, wife of the Marshal, who still lives in the same house in Crescenzago, and two former colleagues of his grandfather whom he meets inside San Vittore.
