= Saint Valentine's Day Massacre =

1929 gang shooting in Chicago, US

Coordinates: 41.9208°N 87.6379°W

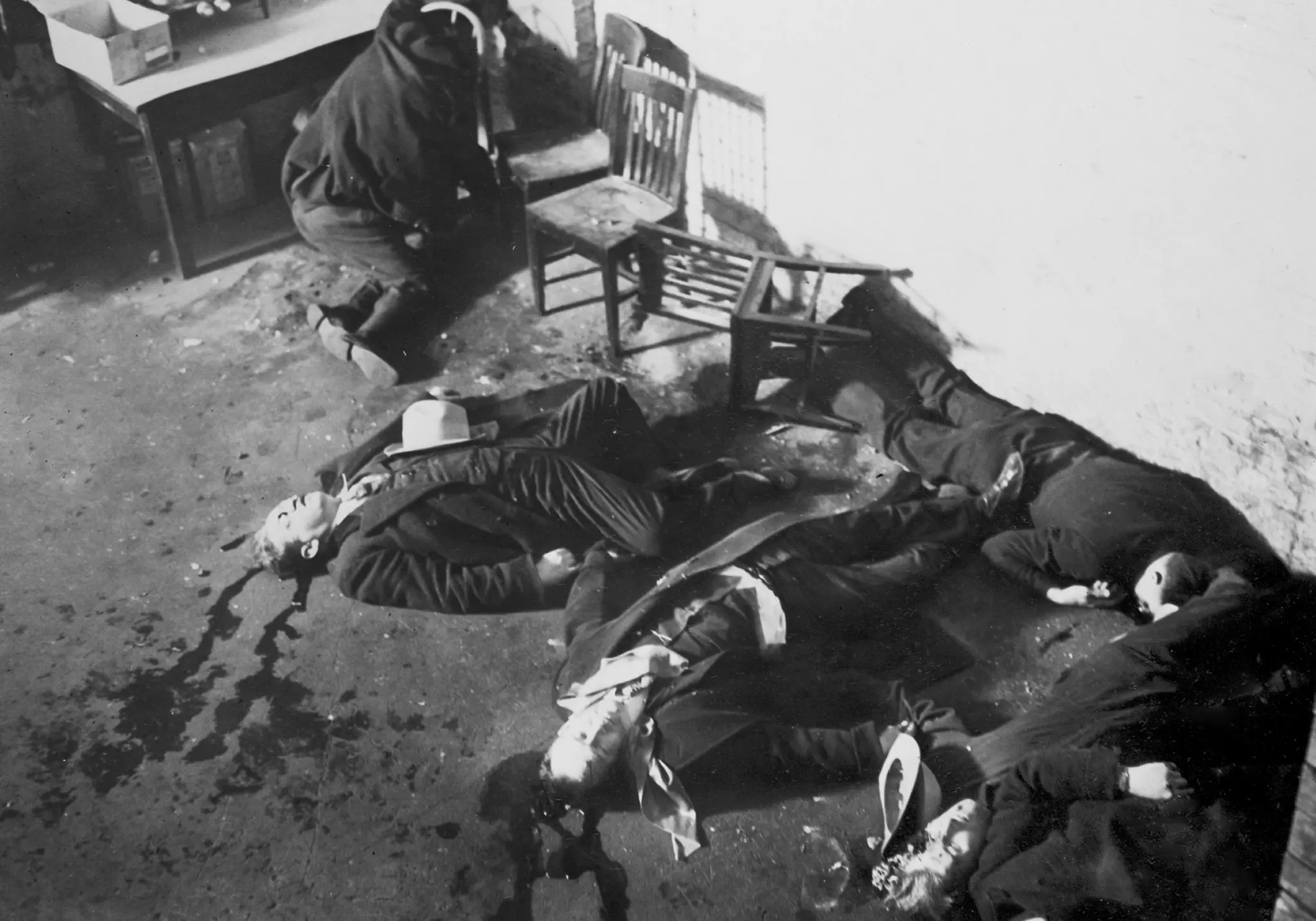
- Scene of the Saint Valentine's Day Massacre
- Location: 2122 North Clark Street, Lincoln Park, Chicago, Illinois, United States
- Date: February 14, 1929; 97 years ago c. 10:30 am (CST)
- Attack type: Mass shooting, mass murder
- Weapons: Two Thompson submachine guns; one sawed-off shotgun
- Deaths: Seven
- No. of participants: Four to six

The Saint Valentine's Day Massacre was the murder of seven members and associates of Chicago's North Side Gang on Saint Valentine's Day 1929. The men were gathered at a Lincoln Park, Chicago, garage when between four and six men entered, two of whom were disguised as police officers. The seven men were lined up facing a wall and shot with Thompson submachine guns and a sawed-off shotgun; seventy rounds were fired from the Thompsons, and one cartridge was fired from the shotgun. Six of the victims died immediately; one lived for a short while but refused to identify the killers.

The murders occurred amid the competition for control of organized crime in the city during Prohibition. Police and historians have speculated that the murders were an attempt to kill the head of the North Side Gang, George "Bugs" Moran, although he had not arrived by the time the attack started. The North Siders were rivals of the Chicago Outfit, a criminal organization headed by Al Capone, and much of the speculation has focused on whether he was behind the murders.

The police, the Illinois Attorney General's office, and the coroner's office all opened investigations into the murders. Calvin Goddard, a pioneer in forensic ballistics, set up a lab in Chicago with his team and equipment. Two cars likely to have been involved in the shootings were found; both had been destroyed. Police arrested several gang members in connection with the shootings, but a lack of evidence meant none were charged.

In 1935, Byron Bolton, who had been identified as a possible lookout at the crime, was arrested on unrelated charges. He confessed to being a lookout and said the murderers were Fred Goetz, Gus Winkler, Fred Burke, Ray Nugent and Bob Carey. His accusation was supported by the memoirs of Winkler's widow, Georgette. The accusations have been disputed by some historians who have suggested that "Three Fingered Jack" White and Tony Accardo were involved.

The violence associated with the Thompson machine gun in events like the St. Valentine's Day Massacre and the activities of John Dillinger led to changes in gun control legislation in the US, with the introduction of the National Firearms Act in 1934. The massacre has been discussed or referenced in books, including histories, and depicted on television and in film.

== Background ==
=== Prohibition and organized crime ===
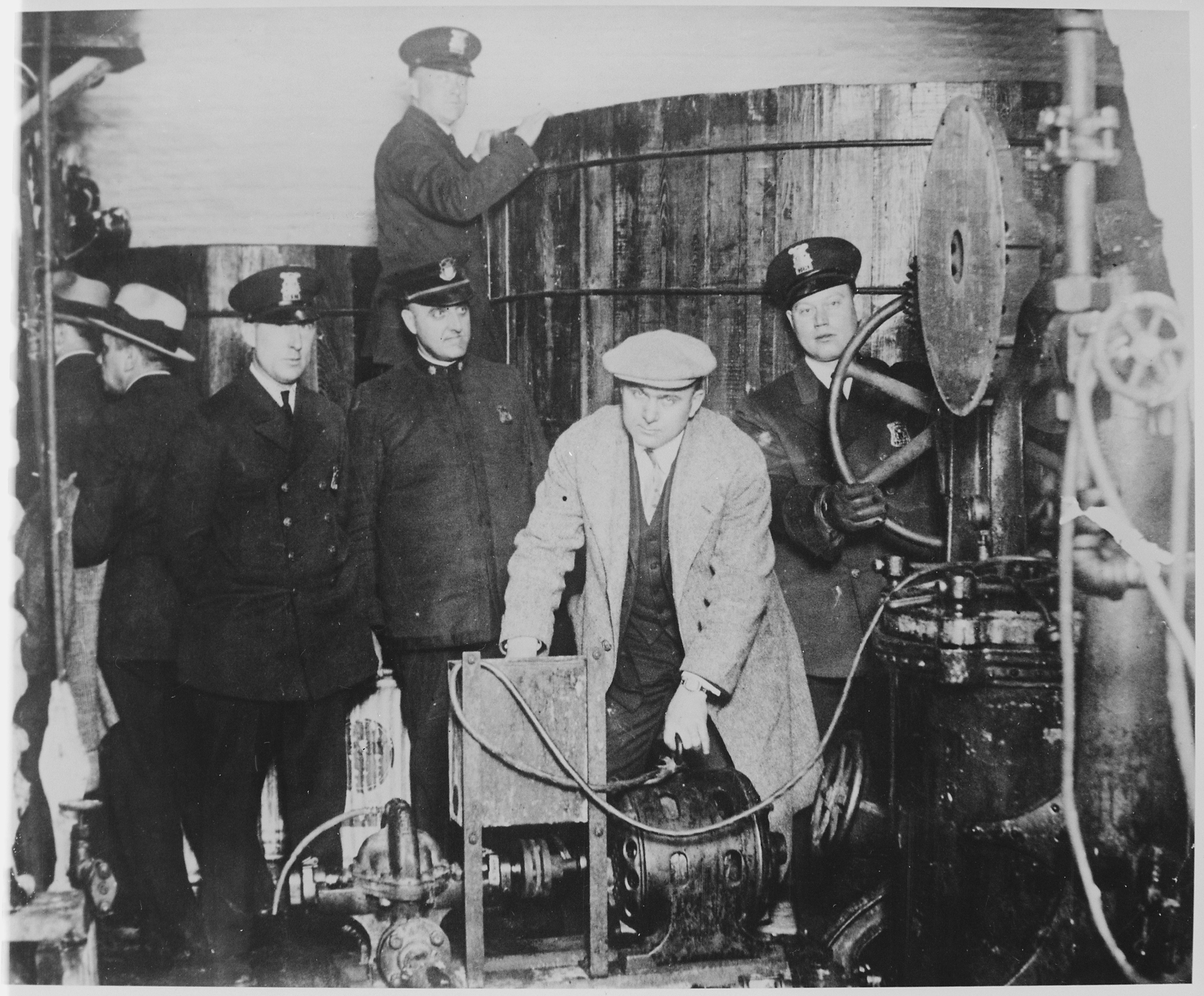
Police inspect the equipment used in a clandestine brewery after a raid

In 1920, the ratification of the 18th Amendment banned the manufacture, distribution, importation, and sale of alcoholic beverages in the United States, beginning the Prohibition era. In October 1919, the Volstead Act defined an alcoholic beverage as any that contained more than 0.5 percent alcohol.

Organized crime in the US pre-dated Prohibition, with gangs already involved in such activities as widespread brothel and gambling-house control. Prohibition brought about the growth of bootlegging, as the pre-existing gangs involved themselves in the illegal liquor trade. It brought with it "a previously unknown level of competitive violence" between rival groups, according to criminologist Robert M. Lombardo. One study calculated that the homicide rate in Chicago, Illinois, for example, rose 21 percent during Prohibition; the Chicago Crime Commission identified 729 gangland-affiliated murders in Cook County, Illinois, between 1919 and 1933 – 15 percent of all murders in the area.

=== Bugs Moran and the North Side Gang ===
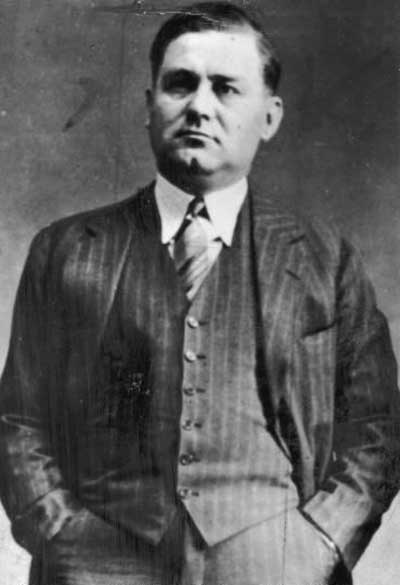
Bugs Moran, 1929

George "Bugs" Moran was the leader of the North Side Gang, a Chicago-based criminal organization during Prohibition. According to historian Rose Keefe, Moran derived his nickname from his "intense stare, coupled with his sometimes homicidal temper".

The North Side Gang was the second most powerful gang in Chicago in the 1920s, behind the neighboring Chicago Outfit of Johnny Torrio and Al Capone. The North Siders were active in bootlegging, running speakeasies and gambling dens, and labor union racketeering; they also continued their pre-Prohibition activities of looting warehouses, safeblowing, and hijacking. The North Side Gang had been fighting with the Chicago Outfit from the mid-1920s. Hymie Weiss, then the leader of the North Side Gang, attempted to kill the Chicago Outfit's second-in-command, Al Capone, on January 12, 1925: Weiss shot at Capone's car and wounded the driver, but Capone escaped unharmed. After the deaths of Weiss and his successor, Vincent Drucci, Moran rose to become the head of the North Side Gang.

On September 20, 1926, Capone was living on two floors of the Hawthorne Hotel in Cicero, Illinois. While he was in the hotel's dining room, a car drove past with a man on the running board firing blanks from a machine gun into the air. Capone wanted to go and see what the commotion was, but his bodyguard, Frank Rio, pushed him to the ground. Ten cars then drove past the hotel, firing machine guns and shotguns into the building and the cars parked in front. Police estimated that over a thousand rounds were fired. There were no deaths, but some injuries, including a woman sitting in a car who suffered glass splinters in her eye. Capone paid all her medical expenses at a cost of $10,000. (Note: $10,000 in 1926 equates to approximately $182,000 in 2025, according to calculations based on the United States Consumer Price Index measure of inflation.)

Despite the dislike between the rival gangs, they maintained a business relationship. Capone received shipments of Canadian Old Log Cabin whiskey from the Purple Gang, a criminal group from Detroit, Michigan; he would then sell the alcohol to Moran's speakeasies. After he was offered a supply of cheaper whiskey, Moran terminated the agreement and sold the cheaper product for the same price, increasing his profits. The new whiskey was inferior to the Old Log Cabin brand and was not well received by his customers. Moran went back to Capone and asked him to resume the supply of Old Log Cabin, but Capone refused, saying he had a new buyer. Moran then hijacked as much of the Purple Gang's shipments as he needed to supply his speakeasies.

=== Al Capone and the Chicago Outfit ===
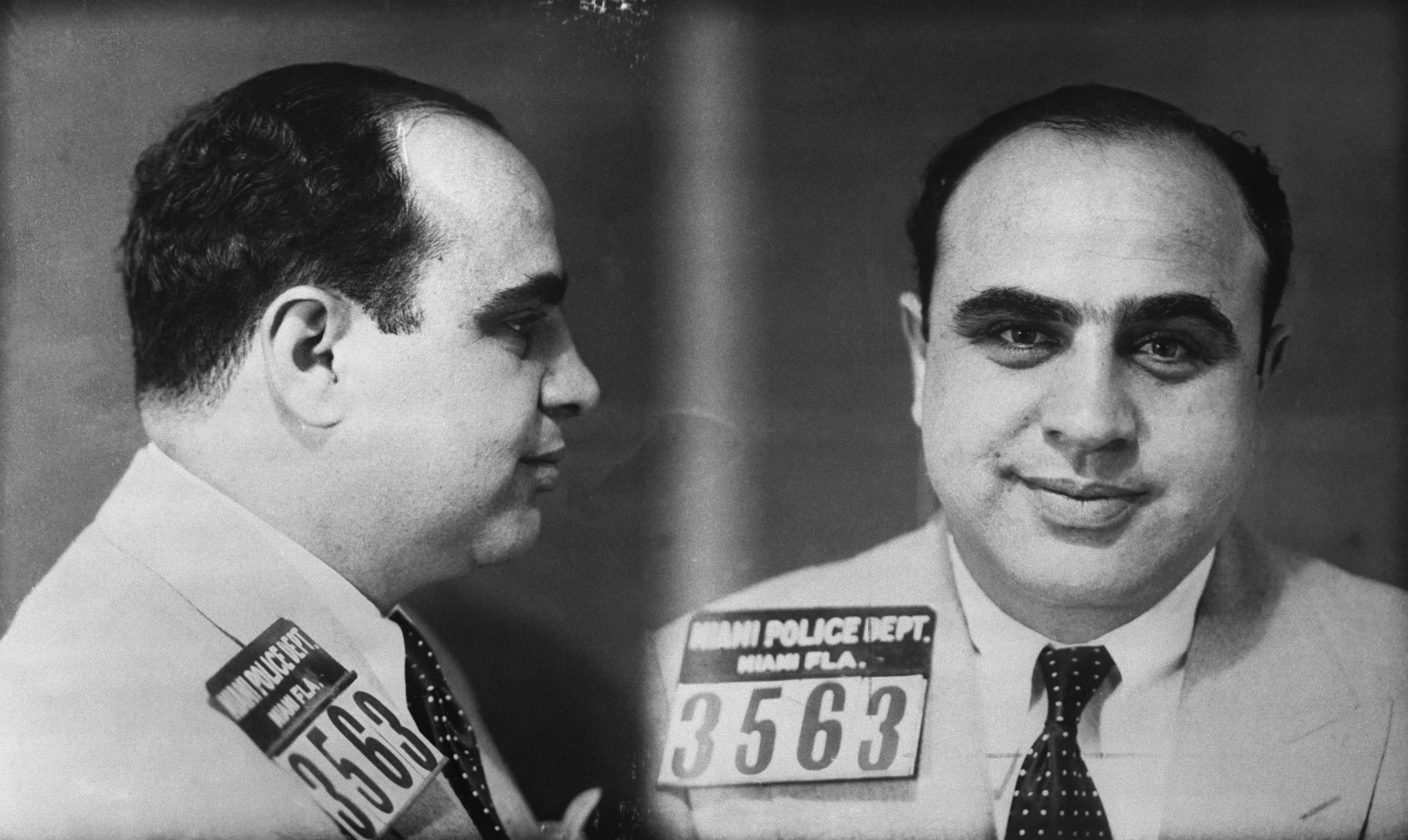
Police photograph of Capone, 1930

The Chicago Outfit started as a prostitution, gambling, and labor racketeering organization in the early 1900s under the leadership of Big Jim Colosimo; it was the largest and best-organized criminal group in Chicago. When prohibition began, Colosimo was reluctant to move into bootlegging; he was murdered in May 1920, probably at the behest of his second-in-command, Johnny Torrio. The gang grew under Torrio as he moved it into bootlegging. He made deals with smaller gangs in Chicago, creating a cartel for liquor trading across the city. On January 24, 1925, Weiss, Moran and another North Side member ambushed and shot Torrio. Moran's gun then failed to fire – or was empty – as he was about to kill Torrio; the North Siders fled, believing Torrio was dying, but he survived. Torrio spent time in the hospital and then nine months in prison on a pre-existing charge. (Note: Torrio had pleaded guilty to a bootlegging charge a week before the attack.) He was so shaken by the attack that, upon his release, he handed over the leadership of the Outfit to Capone and moved to New York.

The year Capone took over the Chicago Outfit, the gang's gross income from their racketeering was conservatively estimated by the United States Attorney General's office at $105 million a year. (Note: $60 million from the manufacture and sale of alcohol; $25 million from gambling; $10 million from vice and resorts; and $10 million from other rackets.) It had a weekly payroll of $300,000 for the thousand men employed and an estimated $15 million per year for bribes. By 1929, Capone's annual income is estimated to have been over $40 million. (Note: $105 million in 1926 equates to approximately $1.910×10^{9} in 2025; $300,000 in 1926 equates to approximately $5,456,000 in 2025; $15 million in 1926 equates to approximately $273,000,000 in 2025; and $40 million in 1929 equates to approximately $750,000,000 in 2025, according to calculations based on the United States Consumer Price Index measure of inflation.)

== Massacre ==
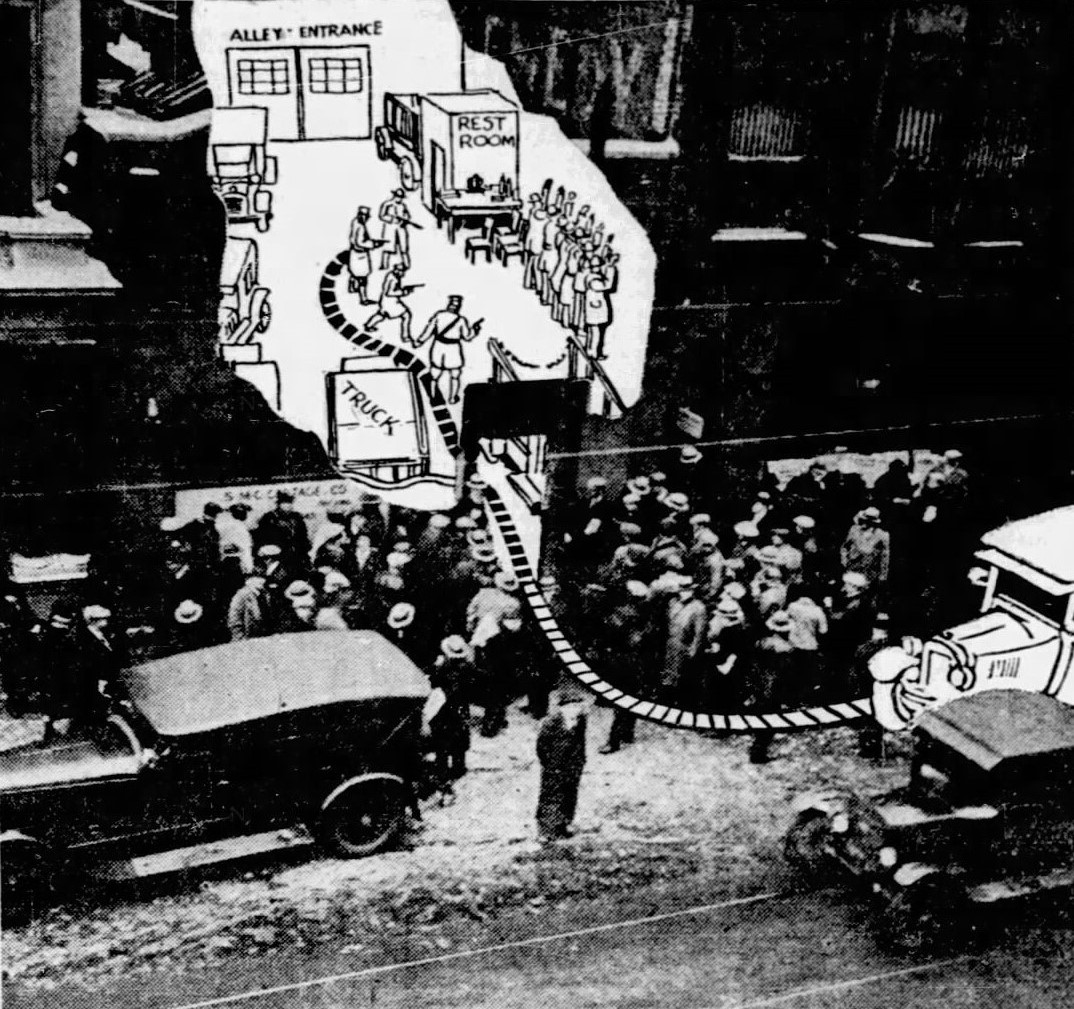
How the murders were carried out, according to The Chicago Tribune

Sources differ about the build-up to the murders. Some – including those by writer Troy Allen and historian Paul R. Kavieff – state that on February 13, 1929, Moran received a phone call offering a truckload of highjacked Purple Gang whiskey for sale. He told the caller to deliver it to the garage at 2122 North Clark Street in the Lincoln Park neighborhood of Chicago's North Side at 10:30 am. William J. Helmer and Arthur J. Bilek, in their history of the killings, disagree and point out that the men, except for two, were Moran's trusted inner circle and best killers; all were wearing expensive suits, which makes it unlikely that they were going to unload a truck. Historian Rose Keefe interviewed one of Moran's relatives, who said: "I can tell you one thing, there was no meeting with out-of-town gangsters or any plans to unload bootleg. They were there to meet George [Moran] because he'd been shot and they were losing their territory to Capone."

On Saint Valentine's Day, February 14, seven men were in the garage waiting for the truck and for Moran and his fellow gang members Willie Marks and Ted Newberry, who were running late. The seven men in the garage were Albert Kachellek (alias James Clark), Moran's second in command and brother-in-law; Adam Heyer, the North Side Gang's bookkeeper and business manager; Albert Weinshank, who managed several cleaning and dyeing operations for Moran; and gang enforcers Frank Gusenberg and his brother Peter. Two non-gang members were also present: Reinhardt H. Schwimmer, a former optician turned gambler, who liked to hang around the gang; and John May, an occasional mechanic at the garage, who had brought his dog Highball with him. May was fixing the wheel of a truck.

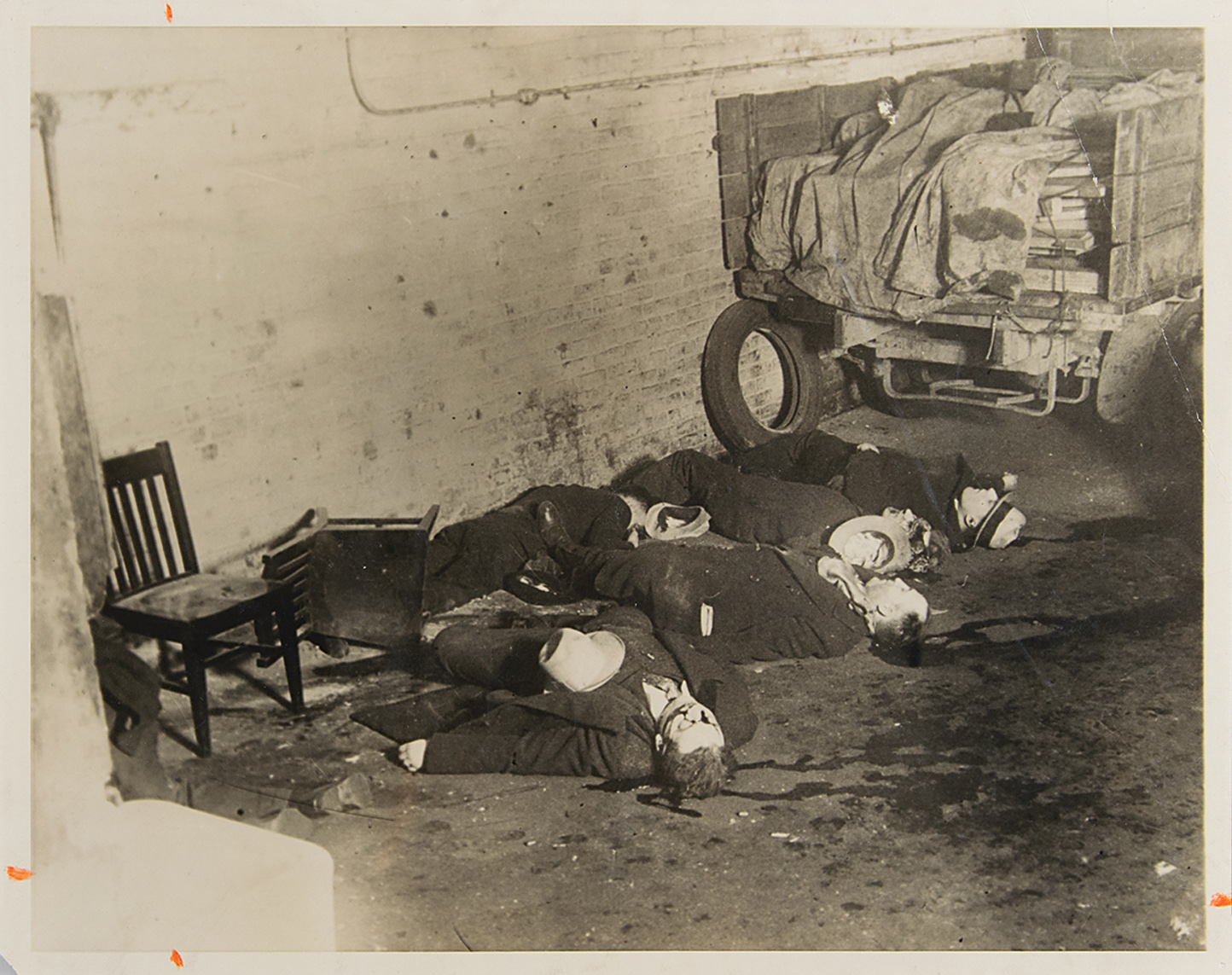
The murder scene

Between 10:30–10:35 am, a black Cadillac pulled up outside the garage. The driver and front-seat passenger wore police uniforms; the three men in the back wore civilian clothes. (Note: There is some dispute about the number of assailants. Historian James Fentress stated that there were at least four men involved, but that it could have been up to six.) They exited the car and went into the garage. (Note: Two youngsters also reported that what looked like a police car went to the rear of the building and men dressed as police officers entered through the rear.) Shortly afterwards, Moran drove past and saw what he thought was a police car; he went around the corner for a cup of coffee to avoid what he presumed to be a raid in progress on the premises. The seven men inside the garage were forced to line up against the wall, facing it. The assailants then shot them in the back with Thompson submachine guns. The shooting was methodical, with fire directed along the line of men three times: at the level of the head, chest, and the stomach; seventy rounds were fired from the machine guns and one from a sawed-off shotgun in the first volley. (Note: A drum magazine for the Thompson holds fifty rounds; a stick magazine holds twenty rounds.) (Note: Some sources state that 200 rounds were fired.) The coup de grâce was then applied to Clark and May with the shotgun. The gunmen left by the front door: two in civilian clothes, holding their hands above their heads, were followed by the two wearing police uniforms, holding the Thompson submachine guns as if they had their companions under arrest.

Neighbors were alerted to the massacre by Highball's barking and called the police. (Note: Sources differ on the timings. Fentress states the call to the police was after several hours, while Helmer and Bilek say the police arrived at 10:45 am.) When they arrived, the police found six dead men and one, Frank Gusenberg, still alive; he had crawled 20 feet (6.1 m) from where he had been shot, despite having been hit multiple times. (Note: Sources differ on the number of times he had been shot. Troy Allen, in his history of the events, says fourteen times; Amanda Parr, in her biography of the gangster Jack McGurn, says Gusenberg was shot 22 times.) Gusenberg was taken to the original Alexian Brothers Hospital in Chicago's Lincoln Park neighborhood. He was interviewed by Sergeant Clarence Sweeney of the Chicago Police Department, who asked him: "Who shot you?" Gusenberg replied "No one... No one shot me." Sweeney then said: "Frank, Pete's dead and you're in a bad way. Who shot you?" Gusenberg replied: "No one." He died shortly afterwards. (Note: Some sources state that in his final reply, Gusenberg added "Cops did it.")

== Reaction ==
Newspapers covered the massacre and investigations, selling millions of copies and "devot[ing] an unprecedented amount of space to coverage of the mass murder", according to historian Laurence Bergreen. The Valentine's Day Massacre caused shock among the public. According to Jonathan Eig, Capone's biographer:

This crime stirred people in a way they had seldom been stirred before. From coast to coast, people seemed suddenly to be reaching the conclusion that a line had been crossed, that the violence had become too much to bear, that the experiment known as Prohibition had blown up once and for all.

When Moran heard about the murders, he checked into St. Francis Hospital in Evanston, Illinois, for four days under an alias, claiming that he had the flu. He sent a message to John Egan, the head of detectives at Chicago Police Department, that he did not know who was responsible for the killings: "We don't know what brought it on. We're facing an enemy in the dark." A reporter tracked him down at the hospital; Moran told him that "Only Capone kills like that".

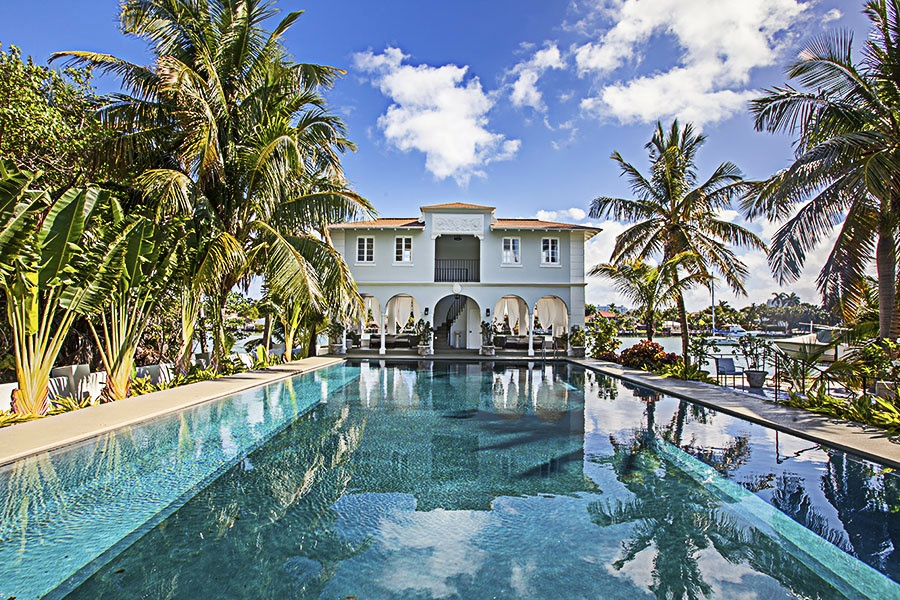
Capone's Miami home, where he claimed to be recovering from pneumonia

A federal grand jury was convened in Chicago on March 12 to hear evidence about bootlegging in the city. Capone was subpoenaed to appear. Instead, he claimed he was sick and provided a note from a Miami, Florida, doctor that said he had been suffering from bronchopneumonia since January. The note also stated that:

it would be dangerous for him to leave the mild climate of southern Florida and go to the City of Chicago. ... There would be a very grave risk of a collapse which might result in his death from a recurrent pneumonia.

The Federal Bureau of Investigation (FBI) investigated and gathered affidavits from several people who saw Capone attending events in public. (Note: These included sitting ringside at the Jack Sharkey – Young Stribling boxing match, hosting two high-profile parties, and visiting the offices of the Dade County solicitor.) Based on the FBI's evidence, a judge turned down Capone's request for a forty-day postponement and instructed him to turn up on March 19. The testimony was postponed one day to March 20, when Capone was questioned for an hour before the grand jury. He admitted that he had not paid income tax – he had previously said "The government can't collect legal taxes from illegal money" – but suggested he could make a deal to "split any difference he had with the government and might pay the salary of several prohibition agents for a year or two". He was scheduled to make a second appearance at the hearing when George Johnson, the United States Attorney for the Northern District of Illinois, said no further testimony was needed and that he was free to go.

== Investigation ==
=== Investigation begins ===
Points of interest
– 2122 North Clark Street, the location of the massacre
– 1723 Wood Street, the location of the first burned-out car
– 1st Street and Harvard Avenue, the location of the second burned-out car

Within hours of the shooting, Chicago's district police, the city's detective bureau, the Illinois Attorney General's office, and the coroner's office under Herman Bundesen all opened separate investigations, which operated largely independently from one another. (Note: Helmer and Bilek observe that most of the files from these investigations were subsequently lost or stolen.) The situation was confused by an announcement, from the Chicago deputy Prohibition administrator Major Frederick D. Silloway, that the police had undertaken the killings. Although he retracted his statement later that day, several newspapers carried headlines that stated the police was involved. (Note: Silloway was moved out of Chicago before the end of February and fired two weeks later.)

The day after the massacre the coroner ordered a reenactment, which was held at the garage. They kept in line with the known events as far as possible, including having Highball the dog present. Instead of a coroner's jury, Bundesen assembled a panel of unimpeachable Chicagoans to assist, headed up by Burt Massee, the president of the Colgate Palmolive Peet Company. (Note: The other members of the panel were Major Felix J. Streyckman, the attorney for the Belgian consul in Chicago; Fred Bernstein, a lawyer and the superior court master in chancery; John V. McCormick, a lawyer and the dean of the Loyola University Chicago School of Law; Walter E. Olson, president of the Olsen Rug Company; and Walter W. L. Meyer, master in chancery for the Cook County Circuit Court.) Plainclothes police and one of the reporters present played the roles of the victims; other police lined up as the gunmen, each holding a shotgun. Bundesen formally opened his inquest the same day. Massee contacted Calvin Goddard, a pioneer in forensic ballistics, and paid for him to set up a laboratory in Chicago with his team and all his equipment. He soon began examining shell casings and bullets from the scene. He also examined the Thompson machine guns owned by the Chicago police and stated that their weapons had not been used in the shootings.

Police began house-to-house questioning of residents and shop-owners. At 2051 North Clark, the rooming house opposite the garage, they spoke with the proprietress, Minnie Arvidson. She described two men who claimed to be taxi drivers that had taken a room at the front of the house, overlooking the garage. These were later identified as Byron Bolton and James "Jimmy the Swede" Morand (or possibly Jimmy McCrussen), the lookouts. A second landlady, Mrs. Michael Doody of 2119 North Clark, provided details of what turned out to be another possible lookout. He also claimed to be a taxi driver, who would arrive at the house each day at 9:00 am and was joined by two other men at around 9:30 am; they would leave at around 3:30 pm. She was shown photographs of possible suspects and identified Harry Keywell, a member of the Purple Gang. When he was later questioned, Keywell provided a solid alibi for his activities on the date and time of the shooting. Police also raided many of the city's speakeasies, causing the Chicago Outfit a considerable loss of income.

On February 22, 1929, police were called to the scene of a garage fire on Wood Street, where they found a partially disassembled and burnt 1927 Cadillac sedan. Saws, an ax, and an acetylene torch had been used in dismantling the vehicle. A police siren was lying in the corner, and a burned hat and coat were on the floor. They also found a Thompson drum magazine and a Luger pistol. Enquiries turned up a nearby doctor's office where a man with burns had asked for treatment; when he was told to wait, he left.

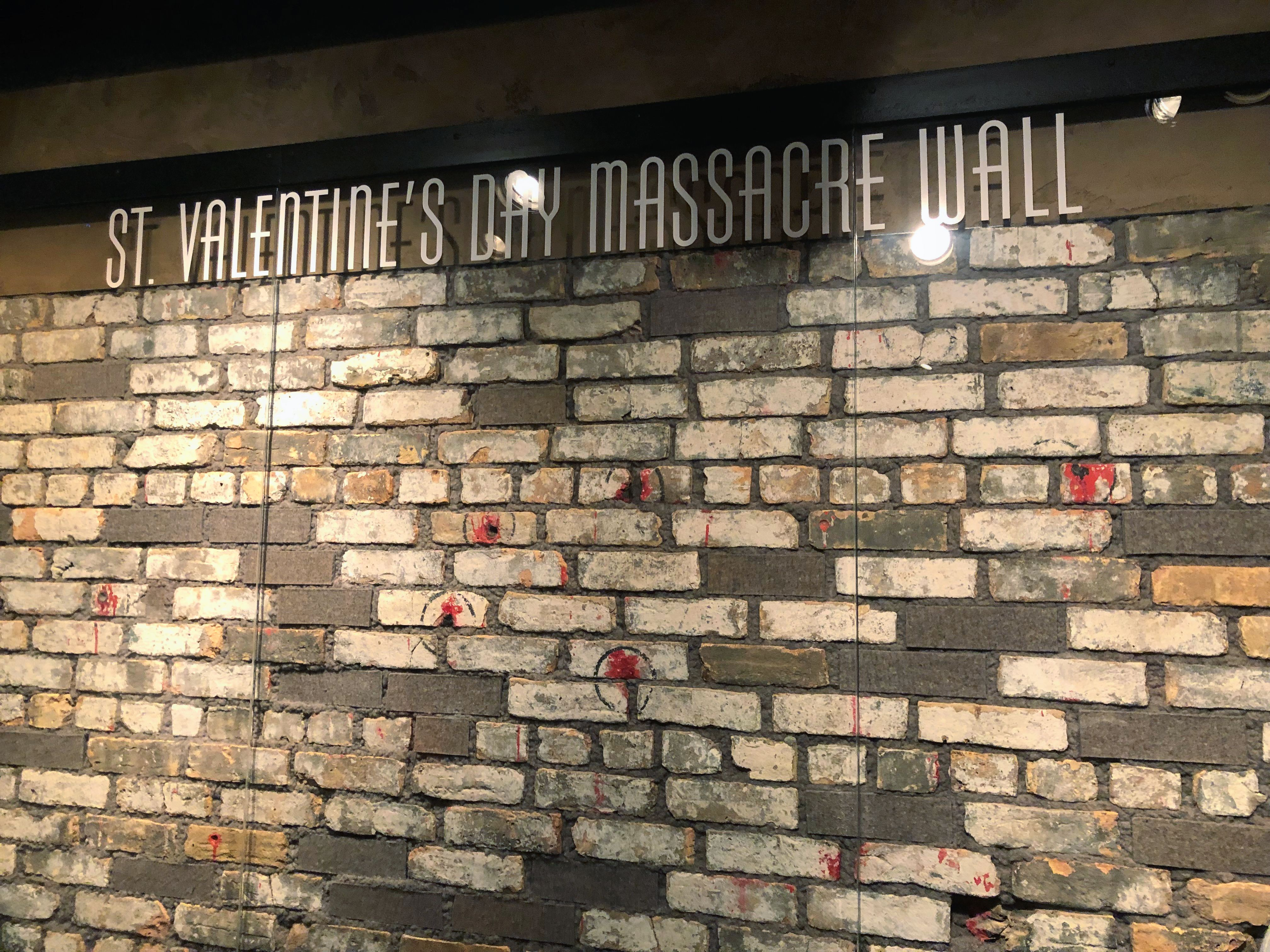
The wall against which the seven men were murdered; red daubs have been added to highlight the bullet holes.

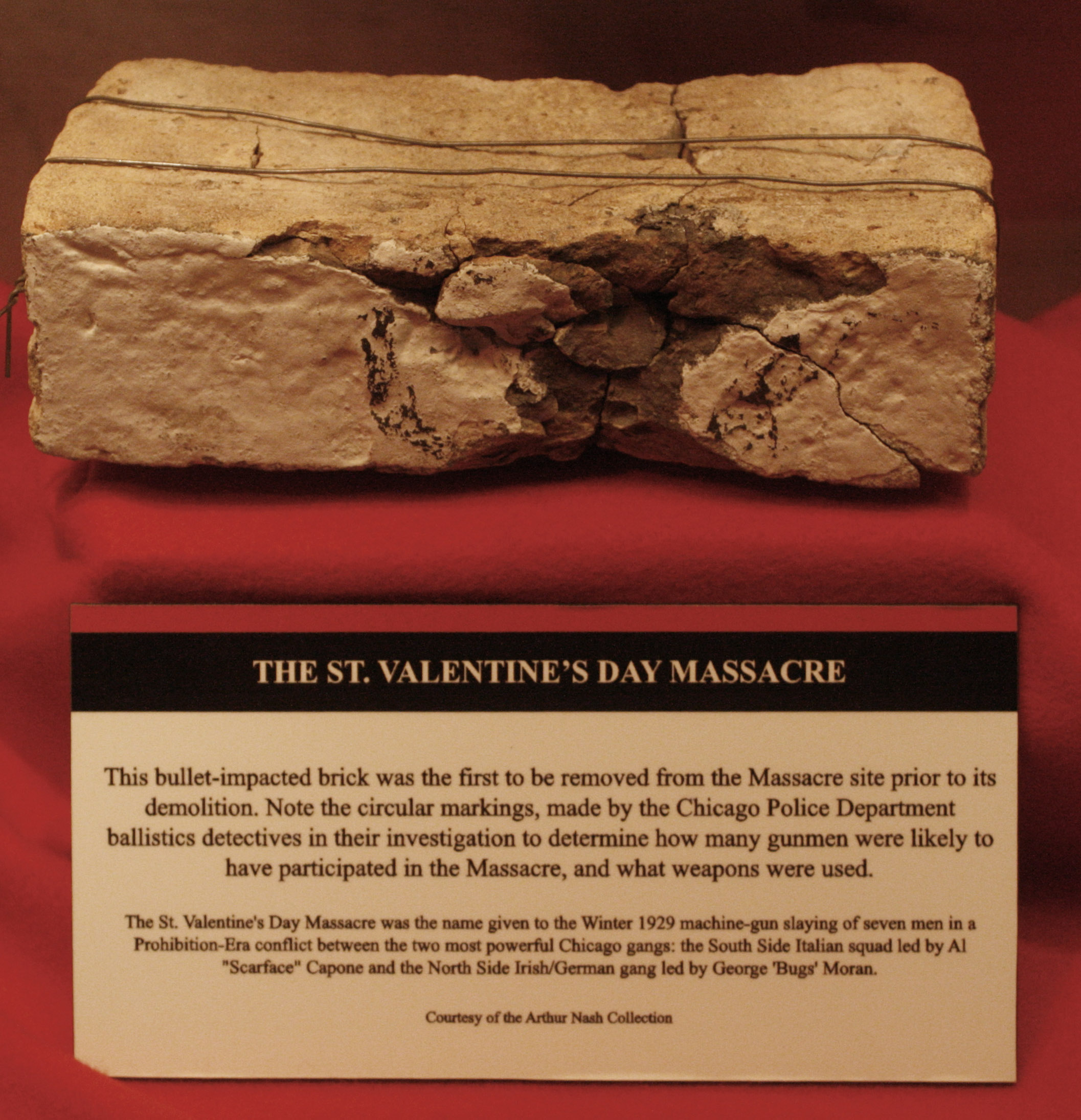
One of the bricks hit by a round

The car had been purchased second-hand in Chicago on December 15, 1928, by James Morton of Los Angeles, California, who paid $350 for it. (Note: $350 in 1929 equates to approximately $7,000 in 2025, according to calculations based on the United States Consumer Price Index measure of inflation.) The Los Angeles Police Department failed to provide any possible leads as to the man's identity. Police established that the garage had been rented by a man calling himself Frank Rogers, who gave his address as 1859 West North Avenue. This was an annex of the Circus Café, which was operated from the neighboring premises by Claude Maddox, a gangster with ties to Capone.

After searching one of Maddox's offices, the police found a connection with activities in St. Louis, Missouri. Their counterparts there told them that criminals had disguised themselves in police uniforms to commit crimes on several occasions. The best-known perpetrator of this was Fred Burke, a member of the city's Egan's Rats crime gang. Burke was described as missing a front tooth and had a partner in crime who went by the name of "James Ray", an alias of Gus Winkler. One of the witnesses who saw the fake police car arrive outside the North Clark Street garage was the chauffeur of H. Wallace Caldwell, president of the Chicago Board of Education. He had noticed the police driver was missing a front tooth. Egan's Rats left St. Louis in the mid-1920s and became associated with The Purple Gang of Detroit, which had business connections with Capone. Police soon named Burke as a suspect.

=== Further evidence ===
On February 27, a second vehicle – a 1926 Peerless touring car – was blown up at the junction of 1st Street and Harvard Avenue in Chicago's Maywood suburb. Again, a police siren was found at the scene with shotgun shells of the same brand used in the massacre, license plates bearing the same prefix as used by the Chicago detective squad and a small notebook belonging to Weinshank, one of the massacre victims. Police considered this second car and the items a plant to disrupt their investigation. Keefe considers the discovery of the second vehicle to give credibility to the possibility of two cars having been used in the massacre.

As Capone was in Florida at the time of the shooting, William Russell, Chicago's police commissioner, ordered an investigation of the other members of the Chicago Outfit. On the same day the Peerless was blown up, police arrested Jack McGurn at Chicago's Stevens Hotel, where he and his girlfriend were staying under the names Mr. and Mrs. D'Oro. His girlfriend provided his alibi: that they had spent Valentine's Day together in the hotel room. According to Amanda Parr, McGurn's biographer, he was "one of mob history's most prolific and notorious hit men". Others arrested were members of Capone's gang John Scalise, Albert Anselmi – both of whom had previously been acquitted of murdering a police officer – and Rocco Fanelli, another Outfit gunman. McGurn, Anselmi and Scalise were all charged with the murders, but the charges were dropped because of a lack of evidence.

Capone soon heard that Scalise and Anselmi had met with Joe Aiello, a long-time rival of Capone's with whom he had a feud. Also present was another of Capone's men, Joe Giunta. Capone heard the men were plotting to assassinate him and take over his territory. Furious at being double-crossed, Capone invited the three to a dinner in their honor at The Planation, a Capone-owned roadhouse. (Note: This is described as being either at Thirty-fifth Street and Indiana Avenue in Chicago, or in Hammond, Indiana.) During the evening, Capone used a cut-down baseball bat to murder all three before he and his men shot the corpses. Their bodies were found on May 8.

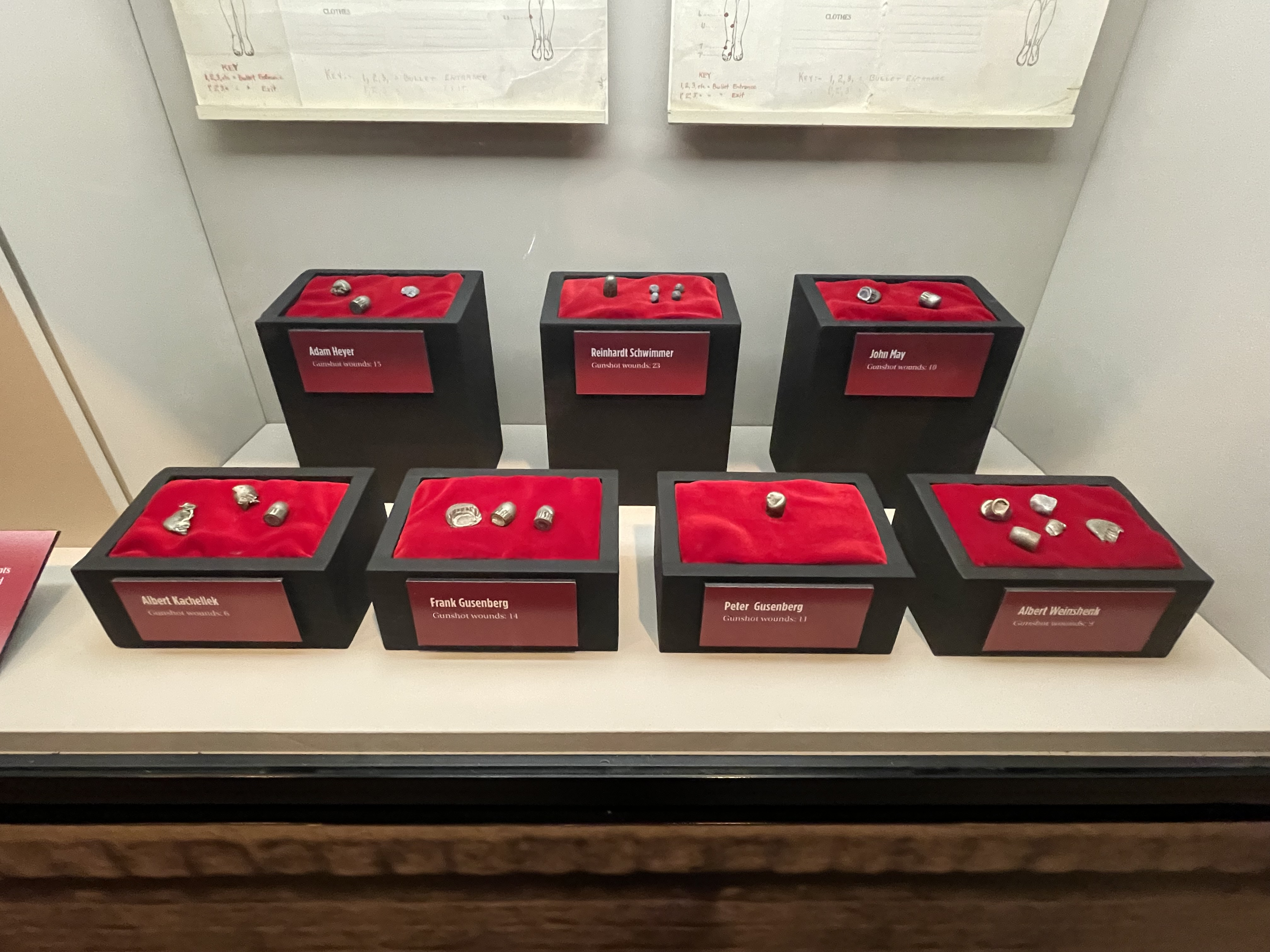
Bullet fragments recovered from the victims' bodies

On May 13, Capone attended a meeting of crime lords in Atlantic City, New Jersey. (Note: Aside from Capone, attendees included: Albert Anastasia, Lepke Buchalter, Frank Costello, Moe Dalitz, Jack Guzik, Lucky Luciano, Frank Nitti, Dutch Schultz, Bugsy Siegel, Johnny Torrio, and Abner Zwillman. Bugs Moran's presence is disputed, with some sources stating he was present, and others stating he avoided the conference.) Many of the leaders were concerned by the publicity caused by the massacre and increased level of official interest in their business. There was also some anger about the deaths of the three Sicilian hitmen, Anselmi, Scalise, and Giunta. The bosses put pressure on Capone to lower his profile by spending a short time in prison.

Leaving Atlantic City, Capone and his bodyguard stopped off in Philadelphia, where they were arrested by two police officers whom Capone knew, James Malone and John Creedon. (Note: Both officers had been to Capone's house on Palm Island in Miami Beach, and it is rumored that Capone paid each of them $10,000 ($190,000 in 2025) to arrest him.) Within sixteen hours he had been charged, appeared in court, found guilty, and sentenced to a year in prison.

The massacre case stagnated until December 1929, when Fred Burke, drunk, drove into another car in St. Joseph, Michigan. Patrolman Charles Skelly intervened; Burke shot him three times and drove off. Skelly died three hours later. Police raided Burke's bungalow and found $310,000 in bonds recently stolen from a Wisconsin bank, two Thompson submachine guns with nine ammunition drums, six tear gas bombs, two rifles, a sawed-off shot gun, and an estimated 5,000 rounds of ammunition. (Note: $310,000 in 1929 equates to approximately $5,813,000 in 2025, according to calculations based on the United States Consumer Price Index measure of inflation.) The weapons were forensically examined and were identified as those used in the massacre. Police also discovered that one of them had also been used to murder New York mobster Frankie Yale eighteen months earlier. No further evidence surfaced relating to the massacre. Burke was captured in March 1931. The case against him was strongest in connection to the murder of Skelly, so he was tried in Michigan for that crime and subsequently sentenced to life imprisonment. He died in prison in 1940.

On November 17, 1931, Bundesen closed his inquest. He said: "All who were under suspicion are now dead save one, and he [Burke] has received a life penitentiary sentence." In his final report he concluded that "The killings were by persons unknown."

== Subsequent events and other suspects ==
In January 1935, Byron Bolton – previously identified as a possible lookout opposite the garage at the time of the massacre – was arrested on a matter unrelated to the Valentine's Day Massacre. Questioned by the FBI, he provided full details relating to the murders. FBI director J. Edgar Hoover reported the details to Assistant Attorney General Joseph B. Keenan in a memorandum:

Bolton stated that the persons who actually perpetrated this massacre were Fred Goetz, Gus Winkler, Fred Burke, Ray Nugent and Bob Carey. Bolton stated that he personally purchased the Cadillac touring car which was used in this massacre, having been furnished with the money to make this purchase by Louis Lipschultz.

Bolton identified Capone as having given the order to kill Moran to take over his territory. When the killers were in the garage, none of them knew what Moran looked like, so "rather than risk the possibility of missing Moran, killed all of the persons found in the garage". Bolton denied taking part in the murders. The list of names matched those provided in the 1934 memoirs of Gus Winkler's widow, Georgette.

Jonathan Eig disputes Bolton's confession and states that two of the people listed had alibis. Eig goes on to say that the plot involved too many people just to kill Moran, when one person could have waited outside the target's house to kill him and that once having missed, it was likely that Capone would not try again. Instead Eig thinks the more likely suspect is "Three Fingered Jack" White, a vicious killer who had previously disguised himself as a police officer to commit murder. White's motive was that his cousin had been murdered by the Gusenberg brothers. Accusations of White's possible role in the murders had been contained in a letter sent to Hoover by Frank T. Farrell, a Chicago resident. The criminologists Arthur J. Lurigio and John J. Binder believe the letter from Farrell to be problematic "and therefore so is the Farrell assertion"; they observe that many of the names and dates in Farrell's theory are incorrect, including the probable identity of his cousin's murderer. The biggest weakness in the theory of White as one of the murderers is that he was incarcerated in Cook County Jail between March 1926 and July 1929.

The criminologist Arthur J. Bilek concludes that Tony Accardo, a member of the Chicago Outfit, was one of the gunmen in a team assembled by Jack McGurn and that the other gunmen were Burke, Winkler, Goetz, and Carey. Bilek considers that this marked the start of Accardo's rise to him eventually leading the Chicago Outfit.

== Legacy ==
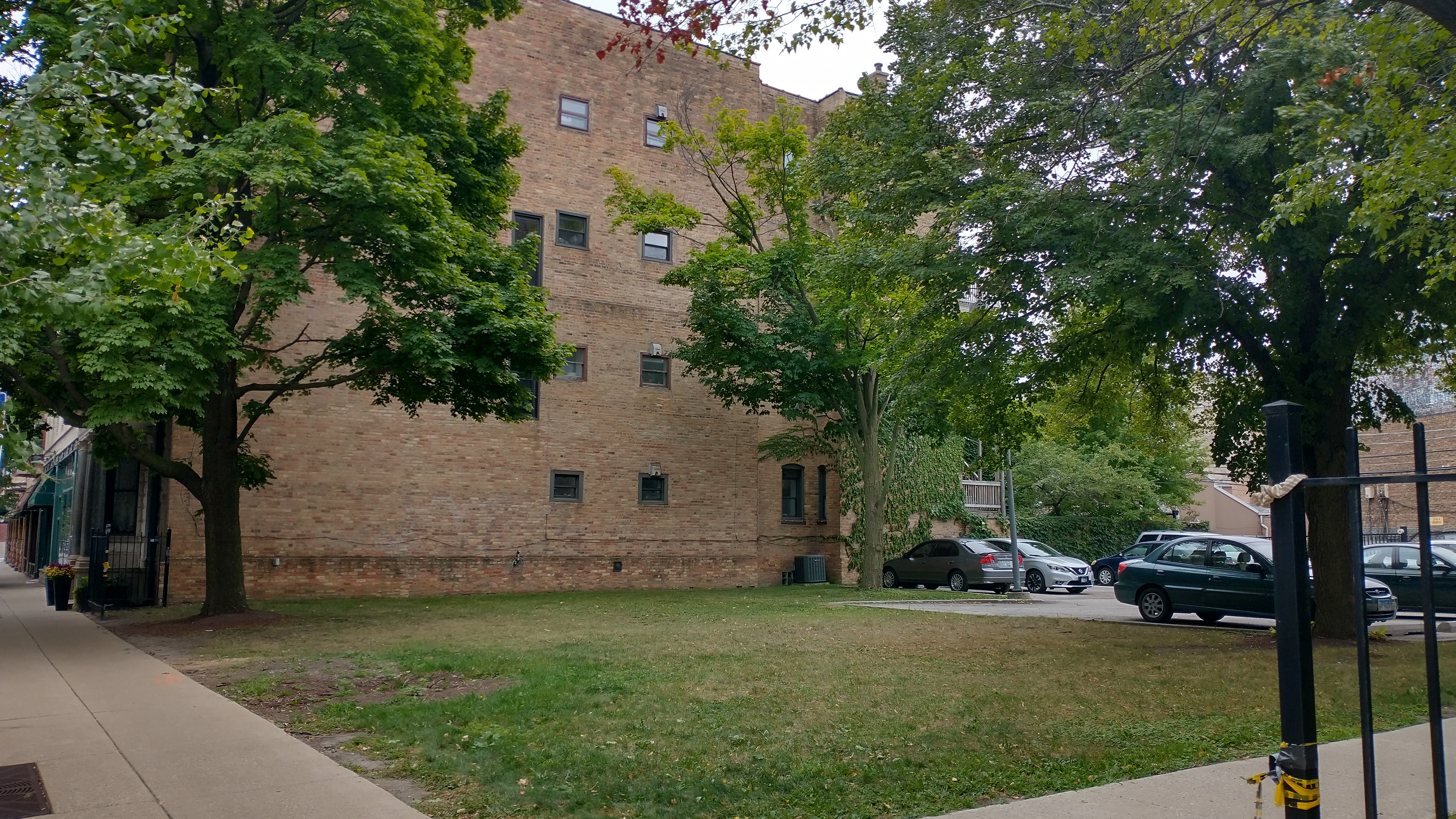
The site of the massacre, shown in 2022

Conflict between the North Side Gang and the Chicago Outfit continued until 1930–1931, when Capone's gang took over their neighbor's territory. In June 1931, Capone was indicted on 22 counts of income tax fraud. His trial took place in October 1931; he was found guilty and sentenced to eleven years in prison.

The violence meted out by the Thompson machine gun during the gangster activities of the 1920s, particularly in the St. Valentine's Day Massacre, the machine gun-led activities of John Dillinger, and the death of Chicago mayor Anton Cermak during an assassination attempt on President-elect Franklin D. Roosevelt led Roosevelt, after his inauguration, to propose a bill to regulate the sale of handguns and machine guns. The bill – the National Firearms Act of 1934 – was not passed. Eventually Congress removed the handgun restrictions, and the bill became law. It levied a $200 tax on every machine gun, which doubled the cost of the weapons, and created a licensing system for dealers that required an annual fee of $200. (Note: $200 in 1929 equates to approximately $4,000 in 2025, according to calculations based on the United States Consumer Price Index measure of inflation.)

The garage at 2122 N. Clark Street was demolished in 1967 and the site later became a lawn. The bricks of the north wall against which the victims were shot were purchased by a Canadian businessman. For many years, they were shown in various crime-related novelty displays. Many of them were later sold individually, and as of 2025, the remainder are owned by the Mob Museum in Las Vegas.

In addition to news and historical coverage, the Saint Valentine's Day Massacre and its aftermath have been described or referenced in books, including histories of what happened, and on screen. (Note: Film: Scarface, a 1932 film loosely based on the life of Capone depicts a version of the Massacre; Al Capone, a 1959 film starring Rod Steiger as Capone; Some Like It Hot, a 1959 comedy in which Tony Curtis and Jack Lemmon play characters on the run after witnessing the Massacre; The St. Valentine's Day Massacre, a 1967 film starring Jason Robards as Capone; Capone, a 1975 film starring Ben Gazzara as Capone; Gangster Land, a 2017 film about Capone starring Milo Gibson; Television: Seven Against the Wall, a 1959 episode of Playhouse 90, starring Paul Lambert as Capone.; The Making of the Mob: Chicago, a 2016 miniseries about Capone, which re-enacts the massacre.)

== See also ==
- List of organized crime killings in Illinois
- List of unsolved murders (1900–1979)

== Notes and references ==
=== Sources ===
==== Books ====
- Allen, Troy (1974). Gang Wars of the 20's. Chatsworth, California: Barclay House. ISBN 978-0-87682-377-4.
- Bair, Deirdre (2016). Al Capone: His Life, Legacy, and Legend. New York: Nan A. Talese/Doubleday. ISBN 978-0-3855-3715-5.
- Baxter, John (1970). The Gangster Film. New York: A. S. Barnes & Co. OCLC 1065807.
- Bergreen, Laurence (1994). Capone: The Man and the Era. New York: Simon & Schuster. ISBN 978-0-6717-4456-4.
- Binder, John J. (2017). Al Capone's Beer Wars. New York: Prometheus Books. ISBN 978-1-6338-8285-0.
- Binder, John J. (2003). The Chicago Outfit. Charleston, South Carolina: Arcadia. ISBN 978-0-7385-2326-2.
- Blumenthal, Karen (2015). Tommy: The Gun that Changed America. New York: Roaring Brook Press. ISBN 978-1-6267-2084-8.
- Eig, Jonathan (2010). Get Capone: The Secret Plot That Captured American's Most Wanted Gangster. London: Jr Books. ISBN 978-1-9075-3204-7.
- Fentress, James (2010). Eminent Gangsters: Immigrants and the Birth of Organized Crime in America. Lanham, Maryland: University Press of America. ISBN 978-0-7618-5215-5.
- Helmer, William J.; Bilek, Arthur J. (2006). The St. Valentine's Day Massacre: The Untold Story of the Gangland Bloodbath That Brought Down Al Capone. Cumberland House Publishing. ISBN 978-1-5818-2549-7.
- Helmer, William J.; Mattix, Rick (1998). Public Enemies: America's Criminal Past, 1919-1940. New York: Facts on File. ISBN 978-0-8160-3160-3.
- Hoffman, Dennis E. (2010). Scarface Al and the Crime Crusaders. Carbondale and Edwardsville, Illinois: Southern Illinois University Press. ISBN 978-0-8093-3004-1.
- Jacobs, Timothy (1990). The Gangsters. London: Bison Books Ltd. ISBN 978-0-8612-4659-5.
- Kavieff, Paul R. (2000). The Purple Gang: Organized Crime in Detroit, 1910-1945. New York: Barricade Books. ISBN 978-1-5698-0147-5.
- Keefe, Rose (2005). The Man Who Got Away: The Bugs Moran Story. Nashville, Tennessee: Cumberland House. ISBN 978-1-5818-2443-8.
- Kraus, Joe (2019). The Kosher Capones: A History of Chicago's Jewish Gangsters. Ithaca, New York: Cornell University Press. ISBN 978-1-5017-4731-1.
- Lombardo, Robert M. (2013). Organized Crime in Chicago: Beyond the Mafia. Urbana, Illinois: University of Illinois Press. ISBN 978-0-2520-3730-6.
- McNulty, Elizabeth (2007). Chicago Then and Now. London: Salamander Books. ISBN 978-1-59223-732-6.
- Parr, Amanda Jayne (2005). The True and Complete Story of 'Machine Gun' Jack McGurn. Leicester: Matador. ISBN 978-1-9052-3713-5.
- Reppetto, Thomas A. (2004). American Mafia: A History of its Rise to Power. New York: H. Holt. ISBN 978-0-8050-7210-5.
- Rosow, Eugene (1978). Born to Lose: The Gangster Film in America. New York: Oxford University Press. ISBN 978-0-1950-2382-4.
- Taylor, Troy (2009). Murder & Mayhem on Chicago's North Side. Charleston, South Carolina: The History Press. ISBN 978-1-5962-9644-2.
- Vahimagi, Tise (1998). The Untouchables. London: British Film Institute. ISBN 978-0-8517-0563-7.
- Waugh, Daniel (2014). Off Color: The Violent History of Detroit's Notorious Purple Gang. Holland, Michigan: In-Depth Editions. ISBN 978-0-9889-7722-8.
- Winkeler, Georgette (2011). Al Capone and his American Boys: Memoirs of a Mobster's Wife. Bloomington, Indiana: Indiana University Press. ISBN 978-0-2533-5606-2.
- Winkler, Adam (2011). Gunfight: The Battle over the Right to Bear Arms in America. New York: W.W. Norton & Co. ISBN 978-0-3930-7741-4.

==== Inflation calculations ====
- 1800–present: "Consumer Price Index, 1800–". Federal Reserve Bank of Minneapolis.

==== Journals and magazines ====
- Asbridge, Mark; Weerasinghe, Swarna (March 2009). "Homicide in Chicago from 1890 to 1930: Prohibition and its Impact on Alcohol‐ and Non‐Alcohol‐Related Homicides". Addiction. 104 (3): 355–364. doi:10.1111/j.1360-0443.2008.02466.x.
- Binder, John J.; Eghigian, Mars (May 2013). "Gangland Killings in Chicago, 1919-1933". Journal of Contemporary Criminal Justice. 29 (2): 219–232. doi:10.1177/1043986213485632.
- Landesco, John (September 1932). "Prohibition and Crime". The Annals of the American Academy of Political and Social Science. 163 (1): 120–129. doi:10.1177/000271623216300113.
- Lurigio, Arthur J.; Binder, John J. (May 2013). "The Chicago Outfit: Challenging the Myths About Organized Crime". Journal of Contemporary Criminal Justice. 29 (2): 198–218. doi:10.1177/1043986213485656.
- Weaver, Greg S. (2002). "Firearm Deaths, Gun Availability, and Legal Regulatory Changes: Suggestions from the Data". The Journal of Criminal Law and Criminology. 92 (3/4): 823–842. doi:10.2307/1144246. JSTOR 1144246.

==== News ====
- Butler, Bethonie (July 31, 2016). "TV Highlights: JoJo Fletcher Sands Out Her Last Rose on 'The Bachelorette' Finale". The Washington Post. Archived from the original on August 1, 2016.
- Murray, Noel (November 30, 2017). "Review: 'Gangster Land' Goes Soft on Crime (and Authenticity)". Los Angeles Times.
- "New Theory on Massacre". Metro. Chicago Tribune. March 29, 1995. pp. 1, 4. Archived from the original on November 24, 2020.

==== Websites ====
- Haller, Mark H. (February 2000). "Capone, Al (1899–1947)". American National Biography. doi:10.1093/anb/9780198606697.article.2000146.
- Kennedy Knight, Marcy (June 23, 2015). "The Actual Tommy Guns Used in the St. Valentine's Day Massacre". The Mob Museum.
- "National Firearms Act". Bureau of Alcohol, Tobacco, Firearms and Explosives.
- "St. Valentine's Day Massacre Wall". The Mob Museum. Archived from the original on February 20, 2025.
