= Robert Carey (gangster) =

American gangster (1894–1932)

Robert Carey (August 25, 1894 – July 30, 1932) was a Midwestern armed robber and contract killer responsible for many crimes during the Prohibition era. He is considered a suspect in the infamous St. Valentine's Day Massacre of 1929.

== Background ==
Born and raised in St. Louis, Carey joined the Egan's Rats gang in his early twenties. By 1917, he had made fast friends with Fred "Killer" Burke, who would turn out to be one of his closest criminal associates. After U.S. Army service during World War I, Carey remained a low-level associate of the Egan Gang. At this time, Burke was away in prison and Bob Carey became associated with Cincinnati hoodlum, Raymond "Crane Neck" Nugent. Both men were suspected of robbing of a Cincinnati bank messenger in December 1921 and trying to fence the bonds through the Egan's Rats.

Carey was an alcoholic who got quite sloppy and violent when he drank. Nevertheless, it was Carey who was suspected of convincing Fred Burke to don a fake police uniform to rob a St. Louis distillery of $80,000 worth of whiskey on April 25, 1923. With the imprisonment of the upper-echelon of the Egan gang in 1924, Burke's crew had relocated to Detroit, where they were arrested for the March 1924 robbery of the John Kay jewelry store. While Carey was suspected of taking part, only Isidore Londe was convicted, receiving a 10-20 year sentence.

Carey was suspected of participating in most of the major actions of Fred Burke's crew in the 1920s. Bob was specifically charged by Detroit Police with murdering two freelance hoods, James Ellis and Leroy Snyder, on March 16, 1927 after he caught them cheating at poker. Along with Gus Winkler, Fred Goetz, Ray Nugent, and Charlie Fitzgerald, Carey took part in the American Express armored car robbery on April 16, 1928 in Toledo, Ohio. The gangsters made off with $200,000 and killed Toledo police officer George Zientara. While never publicly named as a suspect, the Chicago Police Department sought Carey for participating in the St. Valentine's Day Massacre of 1929. FBI informant Byron Bolton would later claim that Carey did indeed take part, along with Fred Burke, Gus Winkler, Fred Goetz, and others. With most of his closest associates locked up or dead by early 1932, Carey left Chicago for the East Coast. He and his girlfriend Rose Sanborn ended up in Baltimore, where they began blackmailing well-to-do businessmen and politicians. The victims would bed Rose and Carey would discreetly take pictures.

By summer, they had moved into a Manhattan apartment at 220 W. 104th Street. Carey, now using the alias of Sanborn, had begun a high-quality counterfeiting operation out of his place. Despite his newfound success, Carey was still isolated, wanted across the country, and drinking heavily. The NYPD concluded that around midnight on July 30, 1932, Carey went berserk and shot his girlfriend Rose to death, after which he turned the gun on himself. In addition to being wanted for the St. Valentine's Day Massacre, Carey was a suspect in the Lindbergh kidnapping. Before leaving Chicago in January 1932, he had hinted darkly to associates that he was planning a crime that "would set the world on its ears". The FBI also investigated Carey in connection with the crime until the arrest of Bruno Hauptmann.
