= Mapleton, Kansas =

- City
- Location within Bourbon County and Kansas

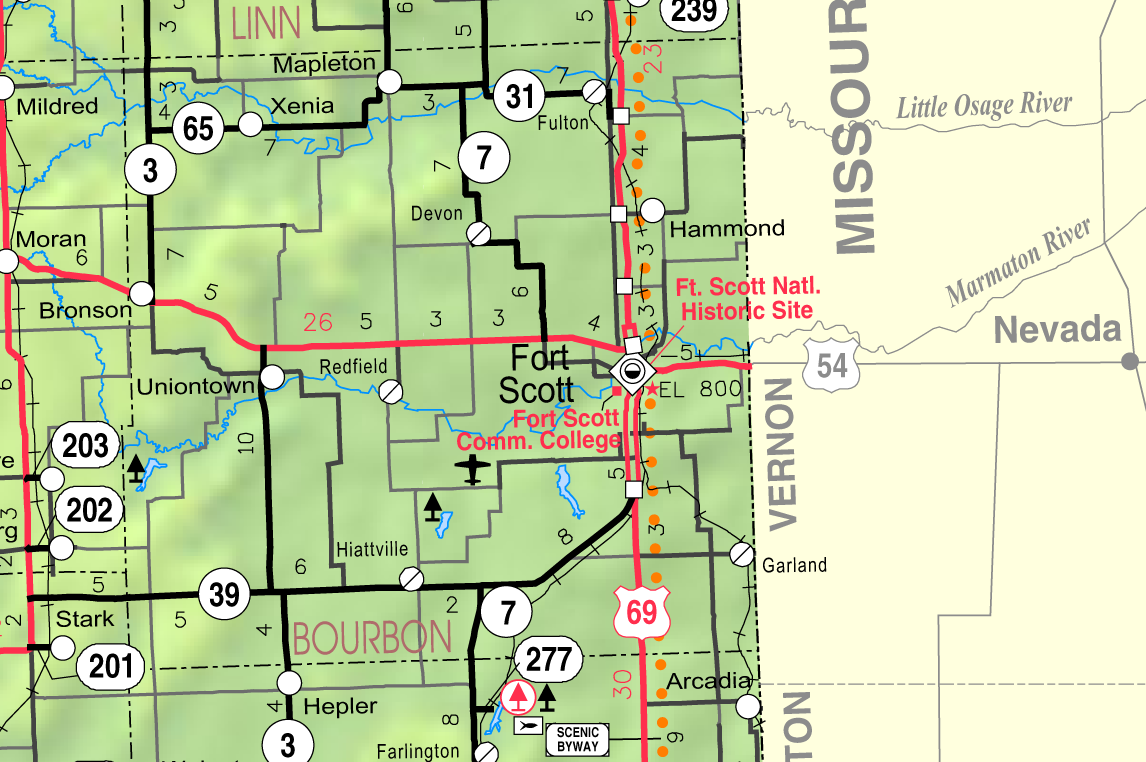
- KDOT map of Bourbon County (legend)
- Coordinates: 38°00′56″N 94°53′00″W
- Country: United States
- State: Kansas
- County: Bourbon
- Founded: 1857
- Incorporated: 1905
- Named for: Maple trees

Area
  - Total: 0.50 sq mi (1.30 km^{2})
  - Land: 0.49 sq mi (1.28 km^{2})
  - Water: 0.0039 sq mi (0.01 km^{2})
- Elevation: 886 ft (270 m)

Population (2020)
  - Total: 96
  - Density: 190/sq mi (75/km^{2})
- Time zone: UTC-6 (CST)
  - Summer (DST): UTC-5 (CDT)
- ZIP Code: 66754
- Area code: 620
- FIPS code: 20-44550
- GNIS ID: 2395844

Mapleton is a city in Bourbon County, Kansas, United States. As of the 2020 census, the population of the city was 96.

== History ==
Mapleton was originally called Eldora, and under the latter name was founded in 1857. A post office was established under the name Mapleton in 1857. The first store in Mapleton opened in 1858. In 1861, the name of the town was officially changed to Mapleton, matching the name of the post office. Mapleton was so named for a grove of maple trees near the original town site.

== Geography ==
According to the United States Census Bureau, the city has a total area of 0.50 square miles (1.29 km^{2}), of which 0.49 square miles (1.27 km^{2}) is land and 0.01 square miles (0.03 km^{2}) is water.

== Demographics ==
Historical population
Census	Pop.	Note	%±
1880	53		—
1890	175		230.2%
1910	230		—
1920	230		0.0%
1930	251		9.1%
1940	226		−10.0%
1950	213		−5.8%
1960	127		−40.4%
1970	112		−11.8%
1980	121		8.0%
1990	96		−20.7%
2000	98		2.1%
2010	84		−14.3%
2020	96		14.3%
U.S. Decennial Census

=== 2020 census ===
The 2020 United States census counted 96 people, 48 households, and 32 families in Mapleton. The population density was 193.5 per square mile (74.7/km^{2}). There were 49 housing units at an average density of 98.8 per square mile (38.1/km^{2}). The racial makeup was 89.58% (86) white or European American (84.38% non-Hispanic white), 0.0% (0) black or African-American, 1.04% (1) Native American or Alaska Native, 1.04% (1) Asian, 0.0% (0) Pacific Islander or Native Hawaiian, 2.08% (2) from other races, and 6.25% (6) from two or more races. Hispanic or Latino of any race was 9.38% (9) of the population.

Of the 48 households, 47.9% had children under the age of 18; 41.7% were married couples living together; 27.1% had a female householder with no spouse or partner present. 29.2% of households consisted of individuals and 14.6% had someone living alone who was 65 years of age or older. The average household size was 5.7 and the average family size was 6.4. The percent of those with a bachelor's degree or higher was estimated to be 3.1% of the population.

27.1% of the population was under the age of 18, 11.5% from 18 to 24, 19.8% from 25 to 44, 21.9% from 45 to 64, and 19.8% who were 65 years of age or older. The median age was 35.0 years. For every 100 females, there were 92.0 males. For every 100 females ages 18 and older, there were 105.9 males.

The 2016–2020 5-year American Community Survey estimates show that the median household income was $38,750 (with a margin of error of +/- $17,878) and the median family income was $39,688 (+/- $30,590). Males had a median income of $40,956 (+/- $453) versus $29,107 (+/- $9,067) for females. The median income for those above 16 years old was $40,787 (+/- $605). Approximately, 17.1% of families and 10.7% of the population were below the poverty line, including 45.2% of those under the age of 18 and 0.0% of those ages 65 or over.

=== 2010 census ===
As of the census of 2010, there were 84 people, 41 households, and 22 families residing in the city. The population density was 171.4 inhabitants per square mile (66.2/km^{2}). There were 48 housing units at an average density of 98.0 per square mile (37.8/km^{2}). The racial makeup of the city was 98.8% White and 1.2% Asian.

There were 41 households, of which 26.8% had children under the age of 18 living with them, 41.5% were married couples living together, 12.2% had a male householder with no wife present, and 46.3% were non-families. 43.9% of all households were made up of individuals, and 29.3% had someone living alone who was 65 years of age or older. The average household size was 2.05 and the average family size was 2.86.

The median age in the city was 45 years. 17.9% of residents were under the age of 18; 8.4% were between the ages of 18 and 24; 23.9% were from 25 to 44; 26.2% were from 45 to 64; and 23.8% were 65 years of age or older. The gender makeup of the city was 52.4% male and 47.6% female.

=== 2000 census ===
As of the census of 2000, there were 98 people, 43 households, and 27 families residing in the city. The population density was 198.6 inhabitants per square mile (76.7/km^{2}). There were 46 housing units at an average density of 93.2 per square mile (36.0/km^{2}). The racial makeup of the city was 97.96% White, 1.02% Native American, and 1.02% from two or more races. Hispanic or Latino of any race were 1.02% of the population.

There were 43 households, out of which 27.9% had children under the age of 18 living with them, 46.5% were married couples living together, 18.6% had a female householder with no husband present, and 34.9% were non-families. 27.9% of all households were made up of individuals, and 16.3% had someone living alone who was 65 years of age or older. The average household size was 2.28 and the average family size was 2.71.

In the city, the population was spread out, with 22.4% under the age of 18, 7.1% from 18 to 24, 22.4% from 25 to 44, 29.6% from 45 to 64, and 18.4% who were 65 years of age or older. The median age was 44 years. For every 100 females, there were 96.0 males. For every 100 females age 18 and over, there were 85.4 males.

The median income for a household in the city was $23,750, and the median income for a family was $28,056. Males had a median income of $12,344 versus $14,375 for females. The per capita income for the city was $14,643. There were no families and 10.3% of the population living below the poverty line, including no under eighteens and 12.2% of those over 64.

== Education ==
The community is served by Uniontown USD 235 public school district.

== Notable people ==
- Fred Burke, a prohibition-era gangster, was born and raised on a farm near Mapleton.
- Charlotte O'Hara, former member of Kansas House of Representatives; raised in Mapleton.
