= USS Chariton River =

1945 LSM(R)-401 Class Landing Ship Medium

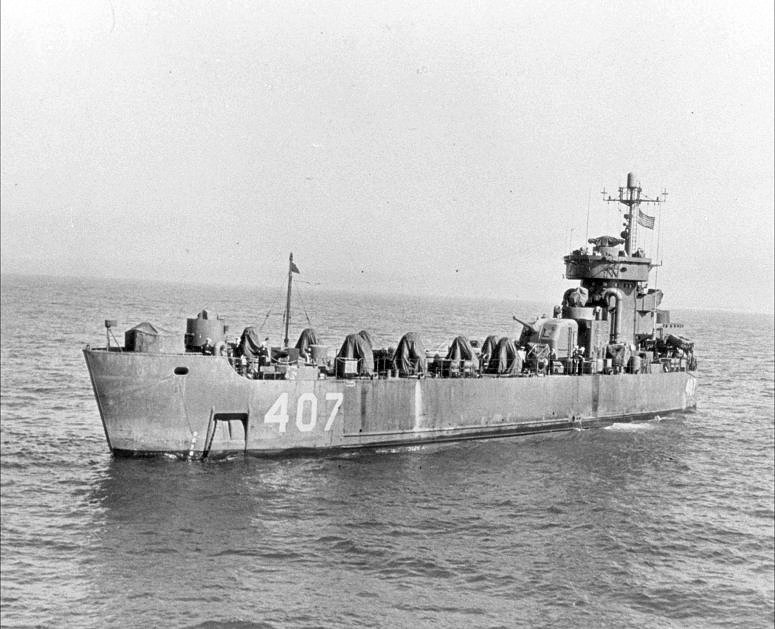
- USS Chariton River LSM(R)-407 at sea. Date and location unknown.

History

United States
- Name: USS Chariton River (LSM(R)-407)
- Namesake: Chariton River in Iowa and Missouri
- Builder: Charleston Navy Yard
- Laid down: 22 January 1945
- Launched: 12 February 1945
- Commissioned: 9 May 1945, as USS LSM(R)-407
- Decommissioned: 10 February 1947
- Recommissioned: 1 October 1955
- Decommissioned: 26 October 1955
- Renamed: USS Chariton River, 1 October 1955
- Stricken: 1958

General characteristics
- Class & type: LSM(R)-401-class landing ship medium
- Displacement: 758 long tons (770 t) light; 993 long tons (1,009 t) attack; 1,175 long tons (1,194 t) full
- Length: 203 ft 6 in (62.03 m)
- Beam: 34 ft 6 in (10.52 m)
- Draft: 7 ft (2.1 m) forward; 9 ft (2.7 m) aft
- Propulsion: 2 × General Motors 16-287A, non-reversing with airflex clutch, diesel engines, direct drive, 2 screws
- Speed: 13 knots (24 km/h; 15 mph)
- Complement: 6 officers, 137 enlisted
- Armament: 1 × single 5-inch/38-caliber gun; 2 × twin 40 mm AA guns; 4 × twin 20 mm AA guns; 4 × 4.2 in (110 mm) mortars (removed after Korea); 10 × twin-tube continuous loading 5 in (130 mm) spin stabilizer rocket launchers (two removed after Korea); 2 × .50 cal (12.7 mm) machine guns on the forecastle; 2 × .30 cal (7.62 mm) machine guns on the bridge wings

USS Chariton River (LSM(R)-407) was an LSM(R)-401-class medium-type landing ship (LSM) built for the United States Navy during World War II. Named for the Chariton River in northern Missouri and southern Iowa, she was the only US Naval vessel to bear the name.

== Service history ==
Laid down at Charleston Navy Yard on 22 January 1945, she was launched on 12 February 1945. Among those present at the launching party were Rear admiral Jules James, Commandant of the 6th Naval District, and Mrs. J.E. Hunt, ships sponsor and wife of U.S. Navy Captain J.E. Hunt. The ship was commissioned as LSM(R)-407 on 9 May 1945 with LT (jg) Robert C. Van Vleck, USNR, commanding.

The ship saw no combat action in World War II and was placed in the Pacific Reserve Fleet near Astoria, Oregon on 10 February 1947. The ships name was changed to the USS Chariton River on 1 October 1955. Struck from the U.S. Naval registry in 1958, the ship was sold to the Tacoma Tug & Barge Company of Tacoma, Washington in 1960 and underwent conversion to a barge.

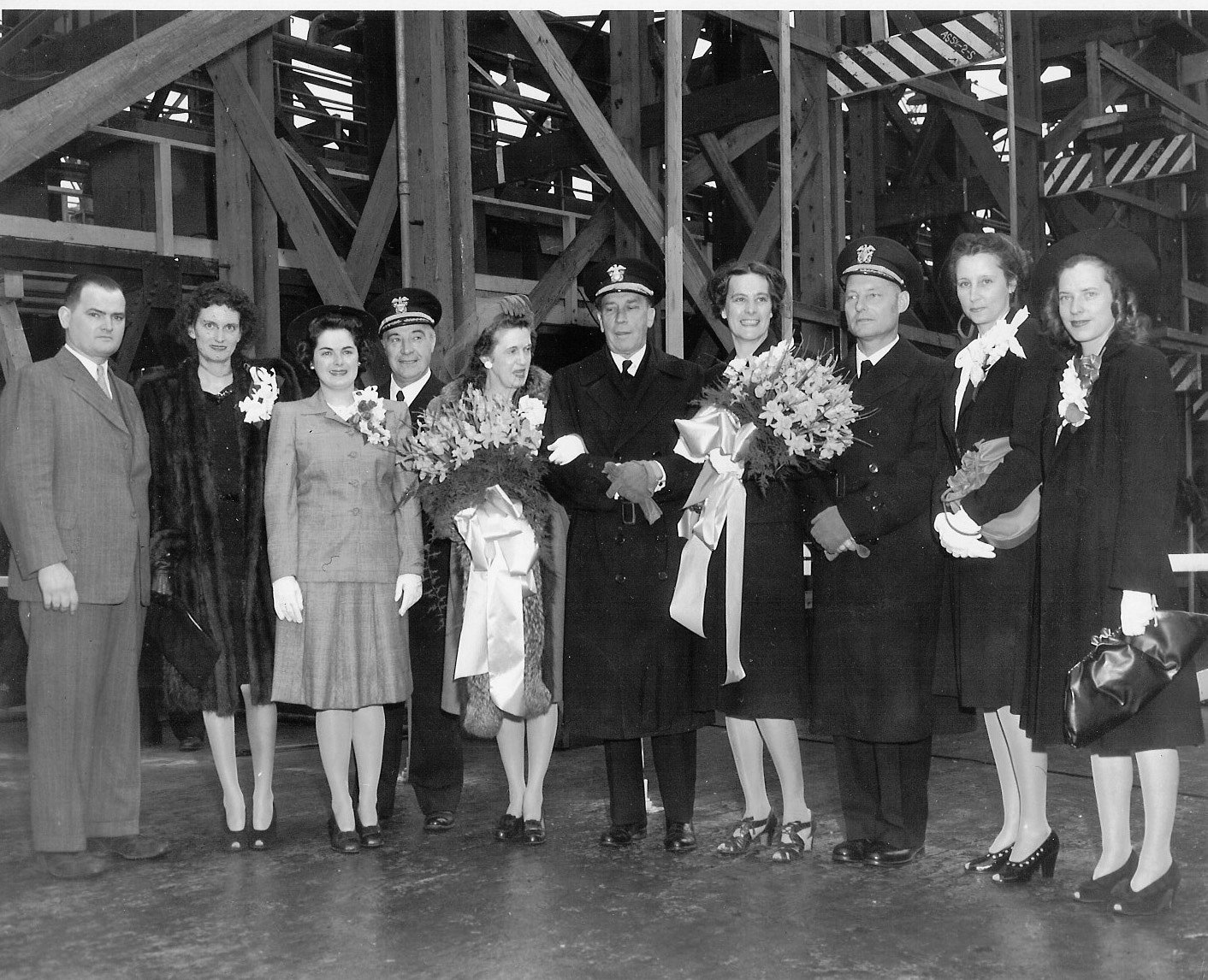
RADM Jules James (center) and assorted dignitaries at the launch party for LSM(R)-407. February, 1945.

== See also ==
- List of United States Navy LSMs
