= Over the Edge of the World =

Book by Laurence Bergreen

Over the Edge of the World: Magellan's Terrifying Circumnavigation of the Globe
- Author: Laurence Bergreen
- Language: English
- Subject: Ferdinand Magellan, Age of Discovery, History of Spain
- Genre: History
- Publisher: William Morrow and Company
- Publication date: October 14, 2003
- Publication place: United States
- Media type: Print (hardcover and paperback)
- Pages: 458
- ISBN: 978-0066211732
- OCLC: 123540266
- LC Class: bl2006012914
- Preceded by: Voyage to Mars: NASA's Search for Life Beyond Earth (2000)
- Followed by: Marco Polo: From Venice to Xanadu (2007)

Over the Edge of the World: Magellan's Terrifying Circumnavigation of the Globe is a book written by biographer Laurence Bergreen, first published by William Morrow and Company in 2003.

== Overview ==
Over the Edge of the World is biography of Ferdinand Magellan that chronicles his voyage from Spain to attempt the circumnavigation of the globe. Magellan was born into a wealthy Portuguese family in around 1480, and became a skilled sailor and naval officer. Despite efforts to sail for his native Portugal, Magellan fell out of favor with the Portuguese King Manuel I and was later selected by King Charles I of Spain to search for a westward route to the Maluku Islands (the "Spice Islands") on behalf of the Spanish Empire. Commanding a fleet of five vessels, he headed south through the Atlantic Ocean to Patagonia, passing through the Strait of Magellan into the Pacific Ocean. Despite a series of storms and mutinies, the expedition reached the Spice Islands in 1521 and returned home via the Indian Ocean to complete the first circuit of the globe. Magellan did not complete the entire voyage, as he was killed during the Battle of Mactan in the Philippines in 1521.

== Reception ==
The book has received mostly positive reviews. Writing for the Los Angeles Times, Susan Spano said, "The book tells the gripping story of a 60,000-mile ocean voyage...by turns sorrowful, violent and promiscuous." The New York Times wrote of the book, "It is all here in wondrous detail, a first-rate historical page turner." The Associated Press and Publishers Weekly have also reviewed the book favorably.

== See also ==
- Ferdinand Magellan
- Antonio Pigafetta
- Juan Sebastián Elcano
- List of circumnavigations
- Strait of Magellan
- The Spanish Empire
