= Fred Burke =

American armed robber and hitman (1893–1940)

- Fred "Killer" Burke
- Born: Thomas A. Camp; May 29, 1893; Mapleton, Kansas, U.S.
- Died: July 10, 1940 (aged 47); Marquette State Prison, Marquette Michigan, U.S.
- Other name: Killer
- Occupations: Gangster, contract killer, armed robber
- Spouse: Bonnie (Porter) Burke
- Status: Deceased
- Criminal charges: Murder
- Penalty: Life sentence

Fred "Killer" Burke (May 29, 1893 – July 10, 1940) was an American armed robber and contract killer responsible for many crimes during the Prohibition era. He was considered a prime suspect in the Saint Valentine's Day Massacre of 1929.

== Early life ==
Fred R. Burke was born Thomas A. Camp, one of eight children of Mr. and Mrs. Wall Camp of Mapleton, Kansas. Teachers considered him as having above-average intelligence and he was a regular Sunday School attendee. Burke's first criminal act occurred at age 17 when he was involved in a land-fraud scheme with a traveling salesman. Burke fled to avoid prosecution and became involved with criminal enterprises around St. Louis, Missouri. It was during this time he is believed to have changed his name from Thomas Camp to Fred Burke.

== Criminal career ==
Burke had moved to St. Louis, Missouri, by 1915 where he became a member of the city's top gang, Egan's Rats. In these early years his criminal activity was mostly devoid of the violence that characterized his life in the 1920s and early 1930s. Burke, described as tall, well-built, and honest-looking, acted as a "front man" for the Egan gang in various forgery and fraud schemes. In 1917, Burke enlisted in the U.S. Army after being indicted in St. Louis for forgery. The United States had recently entered World War I, and Burke served as a tank sergeant in France. After his return from overseas duty and discharge, Burke was soon arrested for land fraud in Michigan and spent a year imprisoned there, followed by another year in the Missouri state prison for the pre-war St. Louis charges.

By 1922, Burke had re-joined Egan's Rats and was working with three other war veterans in various robberies around St. Louis, including a robbery of $80,000 from a St. Louis distillery. In 1924, the leaders of the Egan gang were jailed, after which Burke returned to Michigan with other Egan's Rats members where they became associates of The Purple Gang of Detroit. Burke, Gus Winkler, and the other former Egan's Rats members, working on behalf of the Purple Gang, were the prime suspects in the March 1927 Milaflores Massacre. A few months later, a conflict with the Purple Gang led Burke and his associates to relocate to Chicago. Burke and his associates were contacted by Al Capone, who referred to them as his "American Boys". Based in Chicago, Burke and his associates were involved in murders and armed robberies as far east as Brooklyn, New York, and Paterson, New Jersey, and as far south as Louisville, Kentucky. Among them was the murder of Toledo, Ohio, police officer George Zientara following a bank robbery in 1928.

=== Saint Valentine's Day Massacre ===
In 1928 and early 1929, Al Capone had a conflict with Bugs Moran and his Irish gang from Chicago's Northside. Burke and his associates lured five members and two associates of the Moran gang to a garage on Clark Street in Chicago. Burke and his associates entered the garage, some dressed as police, and executed the Moran gang members. The murders received international press attention and within a few weeks Burke was named by Chicago police as a principal suspect. Witnesses placed Burke near the scene and guns seized from his home later in 1929 were matched to bullets from the crime. Years later, in 1935, Byron Bolton, a captured member of the Barker Gang, gave a detailed statement to the FBI implicating Burke, his associates, and other Capone gang members as being responsible.

== Capture and death ==
Michigan law enforcement fingerprints and mug shot of Burke

Following the Saint Valentine's Day massacre, Burke continued his pattern of armed robberies and the occasional murder. In December 1929, an intoxicated and paranoid Burke, using the alias Fred Dane, was involved in a minor traffic collision in St. Joseph, Michigan. When Patrolman Charles H. Skelly became involved with the parties in the collision, Burke shot and killed him. To avoid capture, Burke fled to rural northern Missouri. A Michigan police bulletin offering a $1,000 reward said in underscored type: "This man is dangerous and will shoot to kill and every precaution should be used in making his arrest." Among the aliases listed for Burke were Fred Dean, Fred Campbell, and Theodore Cameron. Burke took on the alias Richard F. White while in Missouri. In 1930, Burke married a woman from Sullivan County, Missouri, Bonnie Porter, and took up residence near Green City in Sullivan County. While living there, it is suspected that Burke continued committing criminal acts. According to an eyewitness account described in The Chariton Collector, Burke resided in a Kirksville, Missouri hotel, the Traveler's Hotel, for a few days prior to a local bank robbery. Later, his wife would claim no knowledge of Burke's real identity or his criminal past, saying she thought her husband was just a businessman who regularly traveled.

On March 26, 1931, a citizen in the Green City area who had read of Burke and seen his picture in True Detective magazine recognized him and notified authorities. Burke was captured at the home of his father-in-law without incident. Returned to Michigan, Burke was convicted of Skelly's murder and given a life sentence at Marquette State Prison. Having been in failing health with diabetes and heart disease for several years, Burke died of a heart attack on July 10, 1940.

== Documentary video ==
- Fred Lowry (director), How Burke Was Captured (1931) 15 minute YouTube video
