= William White (gangster) =

Prohibition gangster and member of the Chicago Outfit

William Jack "Three Fingers" White (1900 – January 23, 1934) was a Prohibition gangster and member of the Chicago Outfit.

== Nickname ==
His nickname was related to a childhood accident after a falling brick from a construction site had crushed his right hand, resulting in the loss of two fingers. Self-conscious of his deformed hand, White would wear a white glove in public with cotton stuffed in the empty fingers.

== Criminal activity ==
In 1919, he was convicted of robbery and served a prison sentence in Joliet Correctional Center until winning parole within four years.

An early member and much respected gunman of Johnny Torrio-Al Capone organization, White would be declared a public enemy in the Chicago Crime Commission's first published report in 1923 of those "who are constantly in conflict with the law" along with James "Mad Bomber" Belcastro, Edward O'Donnell, Jake Guzik, and Al Capone. The following year, White was twice convicted for the murder of Forest Park policeman Edward Pflaume and, despite being released on appeal by the State Supreme Court, he was imprisoned for several years.

Following his release, White returned to work for the Chicago Outfit as a labor racketeer competing against rival mobster Roger Touhy (eventually planning the murder of Touhy supporter Teamsters International Vice President Paddy Barrel). In 1933, White and Frankie Rio were supposedly sent to Florida by Paul Ricca to oversee the assassination of Anton Cermak, appearing with Franklin Roosevelt, by Giuseppe Zangara. However, they were held in custody and searched by Chicago police while waiting with politician Harry Hockstein in the main terminal of a Chicago train station on February 13.

According to the testimony of Roger Touhy to the Illinois Parole Board in 1957, White and Rio began shooting at Zangara; however, they hit several bystanders instead before disappearing into the crowd dressed in police uniforms of the Cicero Police Department.

In May 1933, he was convicted on weapons charges and served a year in jail as well as issued a $300 fine, although an appeal was later taken.

== Death ==
His body was found in his Oak Park apartment, suffering gunshot wounds to the head and body, after a gunfight with two unidentified gunmen seen fleeing from the building on the night of January 3, 1934.

== In popular culture ==
He would later be portrayed by Gavin MacLeod as "Three Fingers" Jack White on the original television series The Untouchables.

== The Farrell Letter ==
In a 1935 letter to the FBI director J. Edgar Hoover, amateur investigator Frank Farrell identified White as the organizer of the Saint Valentine's Day Massacre. According to Farrell, White perpetrated the massacre as a revenge against Frank Gusenberg and Peter Gusenberg for the murder of his cousin William Davern Jr the previous year. Farrell's theory is generally discarded, mainly on the grounds that there is strong evidence that White had still been in jail at the time of the massacre.

== See also ==
- List of homicides in Illinois § Organized crime
