= Big Neck =

Iowa Nation leader

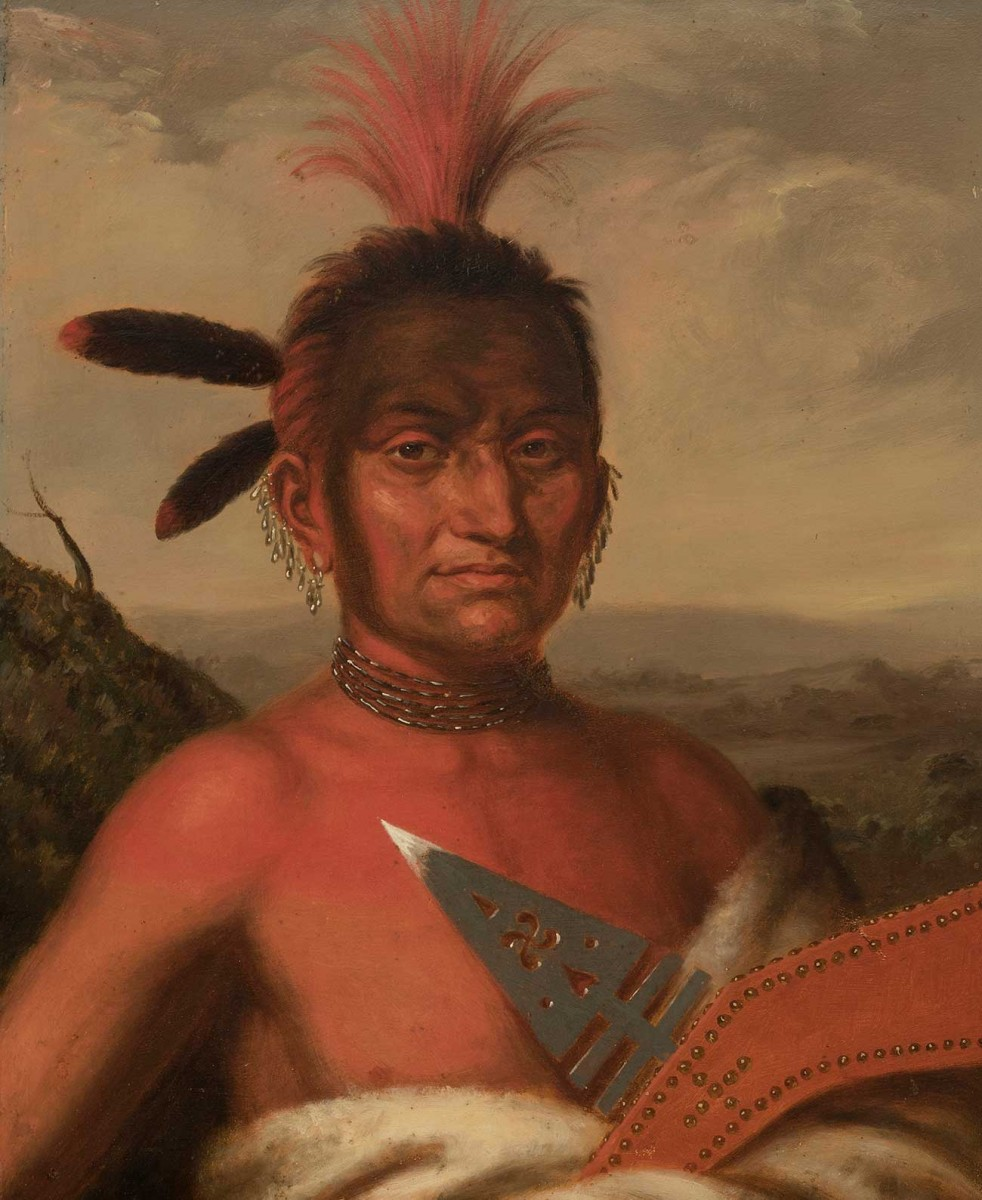
Portrait of Moanahonga by Charles Bird King, c. 1824, in the collection of the Huntington Library

Moanahonga, known as Big Neck or Great Walker (Ioway: MáñiXàñi), was an Iowa leader.

In July 1829 Big Neck had ostensibly led a party of Ioway Native Americans to return to their former hunting grounds along the Grand River and Chariton River leading to the conflict known as the Big Neck War. The conflict ended in October 1830 when Big Neck and some of his party surrendered to Indian sub-agent Andrew S. Hughes. They were tried in March 1830, but when evidence emerged showing that the local whites had started the fight Big Neck and his men were acquitted and released.
