= Chariton River =

River in Iowa and Missouri, U.S.

- Major Missouri rivers, with Chariton River highlighted red

Location
- Country: United States
- State: Iowa, Missouri

Physical characteristics
- Source
  - location: Iowa
  - coordinates: 40°49′50″N 93°28′30″W
- Mouth
  - location: Missouri
  - coordinates: 39°18′46″N 93°57′29″W
- Length: 218 km (135 mi)
- Discharge
  - location: Prairie Hill, Missouri
  - average: 1,333 cu/ft per sec.

The Chariton River is a 220-mile-long (350 km) tributary to the Missouri River in southeast Iowa and northeast Missouri. The river forms in southeastern Clarke County, Iowa. It is dammed at 11,000-acre (45 km^{2}) Rathbun Reservoir in Appanoose County, Iowa, and then flows 30 miles (48 km) before entering Missouri where it forms the boundary between Putnam and Schuyler counties. It enters the Missouri River in Chariton County near Keytesville. 112 miles (180 km) are in Missouri and 106 miles (171 km) are in Iowa. The river has been called Missouri's "Grand Divide" because streams west of the Chariton flow into the Missouri and streams east of it flow into the Mississippi River.

== History ==
The river is believed to have been named for Joseph Chorette, who drowned while swimming in the river as he accompanied the French Jean-Baptiste Truteau expedition up the Missouri in 1798. Variations of the name are Choret, Care and Carrette. Human occupation of the Chariton River valley dates back at least 1,500 years. Petroglyphs found at Thousand Hills State Park near the Chariton in Adair County featuring ceremonial carvings by Native Americans indicate early habitation as do a number of burial mounds found not far from the riverbanks. The petroglyph site is listed on the National Register of Historic Places. Chariton the Confessor was a 4th-century CE Christian saint from Asia Minor.

White settlement along the river began in the early 1820s as pioneers ventured up the valley from Howard County, Missouri. With a few notable exceptions the interaction with the native Sac-Fox and Iowa tribes was peaceful. The tribes primarily used northern Missouri areas along the river as hunting grounds and not for permanent residence. A misunderstanding between settlers and Chief Big Neck and a party of Iowa hunters in July, 1829 led to a conflict known as the Big Neck War. The Sac-Fox had ceded all hunting rights to northern Missouri in 1824, but Big Neck and his band of Iowa refused to acknowledge the transaction. A few brief skirmishes between the Big Neck and Missouri militia were fought, the biggest being at a location known as "Battle Creek" in what is now southern Schuyler County, Missouri. Except for a brief period during the Black Hawk War immigration into the Chariton river valley increased rapidly during the 1830s and 1840s with several counties being formed and communities being established on or near the river in both Missouri and Iowa. As had the Native Americans before them, early settlers found an area rich with game for hunting, ample fish in the river, and large stands of timber.

=== Later years ===
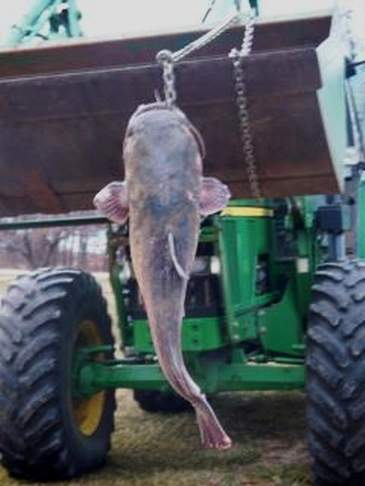
Very large catfish caught in the Chariton River near Novinger, Missouri. Until flood control channelization catfish of this size were not uncommon.

Below the Highway 136 bridge at Livonia, Missouri, the river has been channelized and dredged. The largest amount of this happened in 1948 and 1949 by the U.S. Army Corps of Engineers. According to the Missouri Department of Conservation, "public use of Chariton River watershed streams is very low, largely because instream habitat has been so adversely affected by channelization and sedimentation".

Major tributaries are Mussel Fork Creek and Shoal Creek. Because of extensive channeling the Little Chariton River, formerly a tributary, now flows directly into the Missouri about 7 miles (11 km) from the main branch. A branch of the Little Chariton was dammed in Macon County, Missouri to create Long Branch Reservoir.

== Namesakes ==
- Chariton, Iowa and Chariton County, Missouri are both named for the river, as is Chariton Township, Appanoose County, Iowa.
- Chariton Review, a literary magazine, is named for the river.
- The Chariton Collector, a now-defunct local history and folklore bi-annual, was named for the river.
- USS Chariton River (LSM(R)-407), a rocket-launching ship built for the U.S. Navy in World War II, was named for the river.

== See also ==
- List of rivers of Iowa
- List of rivers of Missouri
