= Gus Winkler =

American mobster (1901–1933)

- CPD mugshot of Winkler
- Born: August Henry Winkeler; March 28, 1901; Lemay, Missouri, U.S.
- Died: October 9, 1933 (aged 32); Chicago, Illinois, U.S.
- Occupations: Gangster, Criminal
- Spouse: Georgette (Bence) Winkeler

Gus Winkler (March 28, 1901 – October 9, 1933) was an American gangster who headed a Prohibition-era criminal gang specializing in armed robbery and murder for hire with Fred "Killer" Burke. Winkler was a senior associate of Chicago Outfit boss Al Capone and is considered a suspect in the St. Valentine's Day Massacre. Winkler is believed to be the first member of the National Crime Syndicate to be murdered for talking to the FBI.

== Early life ==
Winkler was born August Henry Winkeler to Bernard J. Winkeler (September 28, 1862 - November 23, 1928) and Mary K. (June 1, 1862 - March 5, 1923) in Lemay, Missouri; he was a brother to Clara (April 21, 1895 – June 23, 1987), Jacob C. (1893-1961) and Anna C. (1890-1960).

In September 1917, at the age of 16, Winkler enlisted in the U.S. Army Ambulance Corps and served on the Western Front with the 91st Infantry Division. After his return to America, Winkler joined up with the notorious Egan's Rats gang. It was during this time that he first became associated with Fred "Killer" Burke and Bob Carey, among others. Winkler later confessed to his wife Georgette to participating in the "one-way ride" murder of auto thief Wesley Smith in July 1923. After the heart of the Egan gang went to prison for mail robbery in November 1924, Winkler and his pals signed on with the South City-based Cuckoo Gang. Winkler, Burke, and Milford Jones were captured in downtown St. Louis on June 5, 1925 after a high-speed chase and shootout with the St. Louis police. Within a year and a half, Winkler moved to Detroit and briefly aligned himself with the Purple Gang that was under control of Abe Bernstein.

== Partnership with Al Capone ==
After arousing the ire of Al Capone by kidnapping a Detroit gambler, Winkler and his pals hired out for freelance work from Capone and the Chicago Outfit in exchange for releasing the gambler unharmed. Capone and Winkler cultivated a close friendship and the Chicago mob boss used Gus and his friends (Fred Burke, Bob Carey, Raymond "Crane Neck" Nugent and Fred Goetz) for special assignments. Capone jokingly referred to the men as his "American Boys." Circumstantial evidence and testimony from Georgette Winkeler indicates that Winkler and his crew may have participated in the July 1928 murder of Brooklyn gangster Frankie Yale and the St. Valentine's Day Massacre. The American Boys were also implicated in the murder of Toledo police officer George Zientara on April 16, 1928, who was shot dead in the aftermath of an American Express armored truck heist. Winkler himself enjoyed Capone's complete confidence, even after Fred Burke was publicly named as a suspect in the massacre and the discovery of the murder weapons. Winkler often told people that he worked as a 'contractor' which might have played on the undertone of the word and his career as a contract killer.

== Later criminal career ==
The fallout from the Valentine's Day massacre proved to be the undoing of the American Boys as an Outfit sub-group. Fred Burke was eventually captured and imprisoned for the first degree murder of Police Officer Charles Skelly in St. Joseph, Michigan, Bob Carey was exiled from Chicago after attempting to blackmail a friend of Capone's, and Crane Neck Nugent vanished without a trace.

Gus Winkler, along with St. Louis gangster John "Babs" Moran, was severely injured in a car accident in Berrien County, Michigan on August 3, 1931. Winkler survived the crash, although he suffered severe head injuries and lost an eye. While he was recovering in Michigan, he was accused of several crimes, including the historic and unprecedented September 1930 Lincoln National Bank robbery, which netted the perpetrators almost US$3 million, mostly in bonds. Among the law enforcement officials who confronted Winkler in the hospital was Roy Steffen of the Secret Six, a wealthy and powerful Chicago vigilante organization. Steffen was reportedly there to get Winkler to help the Secret Six pin a murder on Al Capone. That effort failed, but Steffen settled for another win, negotiating with Winkler for hours and eventually striking a deal for the return of the Lincoln National Bank bonds in exchange for not prosecuting him for the robbery or other crimes. Winkler insisted he hadn't robbed the bank, but knew who did, and he continued to profess his innocence when he was brought to Lincoln on the robbery charge. After he arrived in Lincoln by train, under heavy guard, Al Capone paid Winkler's $100,000 bail. As part of his bargain with Winkler, Steffen traveled to Buffalo, New York to gather evidence Winkler was in that city on the date of the Lincoln robbery. In January 1932, Steffen recovered $583,000 in bonds, as well as proof that $2,217,000 in bonds had been destroyed and could be reissued. But the deal was condemned by many observers, including Nebraska Governor Charles W. Bryan, prompting Steffen and the Secret Six to offer a new story, possibly completely made up, in which the robbers returned the bonds because Steffen was about to raid their hideout.

By the next year, Gus Winkler had carved out a lucrative position as the Outfit's boss of the former territory of Bugs Moran's North Side Gang, after Teddy Newberry requested his assistance.

== Under Frank Nitti ==
The beginning of the end for Gus Winkler began upon Capone's 1931 imprisonment for tax evasion. With Frank Nitti now in charge of the Outfit, Winkler was left taking orders from Italian-American gangsters who didn't trust him. Nitti and other more old school Outfit mobsters had never agreed with Capone's decision to assign positions of trust and authority to non-Italian gangsters like Gus Winkler. After Teddy Newberry paid for Nitti to be shot and nearly killed by Chicago Police Department Detective Harry Lang in December 1932, fellow gangster Ralph Pierce plied Newberry with alcohol until he admitted the truth about his own involvement. In response, Nitti ordered Newberry's murder.

Angered by Winkler's insistence on subtracting pensions for his deceased crew members families from North Side Outfit street taxes, Nitti demoted Winkler and put Ralph Pierce in charge of the North Side instead.

== Assassination ==
In the summer of 1933, Gus Winkler was observed making visits to the Bankers Building office of FBI Special Agent in Charge Melvin Purvis. When the news reached him, Nitti was enraged. In reality, Winkler, who had been infuriated by the unnecessary violence of the Kansas City Massacre, was helping the FBI's manhunt for fugitive perpetrator Verne Miller. To Nitti, however, talking to the Feds about anything at all was a death penalty offense.

On the afternoon of October 9, 1933, while entering the beer distribution office of Charles Weber at 1414 Roscoe Street, Winkler was hit by a number of shotgun blasts fired by unknown assailants hidden in the back of a green delivery truck. Winkler died half-an-hour later after arriving at a local hospital. He was buried at Park Lawn Cemetery in St. Louis. Winkler was one of the first casualties of a half-year-long purge where Frank Nitti eliminated the last of the so-called American Boys; including one of Winkler's alleged killers, Fred Goetz. Gus's wife, the former 'Georgette Bence' (1898-1962), later wrote her memoirs in which she detailed her life with the notorious gangster.

== Other ==
On February 29, 1960, while at his home in Florence, South Carolina, former FBI agent Melvin Purvis died from a gunshot wound to the head fired from a .45 automatic given to him by fellow agents when he resigned from the Bureau. The FBI investigated his death and declared it a suicide, although the official coroner's report did not label the cause of death as such. A later investigation suggested that Purvis may have shot himself accidentally while trying to extract a tracer bullet jammed in the pistol. Later investigation revealed that the pistol that had taken Purvis's life had once belonged to none other than gangster Gus Winkler; the gun is believed to have been confiscated from Winkler during his debriefing at the Bankers Building in the summer of 1933.

== See also ==
- List of homicides in Illinois § Organized crime
