= The Chariton Collector =

American magazine

- The Chariton Collector, April, 1981
- Categories: News magazine
- Frequency: Biannually
- Publisher: Kirksville R-III School District
- First issue: Fall, 1980
- Final issue: 1989
- Country: United States
- Based in: Kirksville, Missouri
- Language: English

The Chariton Collector was a local history and folklore magazine published biannually between 1980 and 1989 by students at Kirksville High School, Kirksville, Missouri. The magazine took its name from the Chariton River, which flows through northeast Missouri.

== The beginnings ==
In Fall of 1979 a new class, Local History, was offered as an elective at Kirksville High School under the direction of Mrs. Carol Trowbridge. Instead of standard textbook instruction Mrs. Trowbridge envisioned an interactive learning experience where students would collect oral histories from the people of Adair County and the larger northeast Missouri area. This was inspired by the success of the Foxfire books and magazines along with an increased interest in local history brought about by the U.S. Bicentennial. In the summer of 1980, realizing that the stories written and interviews conducted during the class year should be preserved and published for the general public to enjoy, Mrs. Trowbridge and student volunteers compiled and edited the first issue of The Chariton Collector, which was released in Fall, 1980.

== A decade of success ==
From the first issue the general public greeted The Chariton Collector with eagerness, all of the initial printing of 1,250 magazines selling out within a few weeks time. A change in leadership took place in Fall, 1982 as Mrs. Mary Grossnickle took over the renamed "Local and State History" class from the departing Mrs. Trowbridge. Operated on a non-profit basis, any proceeds from sales of Collector issues were used to fund the next issue's printing as well as purchase supplies needed to fulfill the class's primary mission of recording and cataloging oral histories. Over a ten-year period a total of eighteen issues, comprising over 150 stories were published. Little-known or forgotten tales from the whimsical to the gruesome found their way into the pages of the Collector. A typical issue might include the famous, like author Lester Dent and circus impresario William Preston Hall, or the unknown like local basket weavers and former residents of a coal mining camp.

== Premature demise ==
In the late 1980s the Kirksville R-III school district was facing substantial budget shortfalls, necessitating cutbacks in various classes, programs, and extracurricular activities. Despite the fact that The Chariton Collector was largely self-funded, the class responsible for its publication, now named "Missouri History", was removed from the elective offerings and the final issue of the Collector published in Spring, 1989. Thanks to the internet and the work of Ms. Katherine Goodwin, a student at Truman State University, The Chariton Collector experienced a rebirth of sorts in 2006. All stories and photographs from each of the eighteen issues were scanned and placed online for free use by the general public via the website of Truman State's Pickler Memorial Library. Additionally, Kirksville High School donated interview tapes, transcripts, and photographs associated with The Chariton Collector to Pickler Libraries' Special Collections department. Rare copies of the Collector can sometimes be found for sale online or at public auctions, but always for many times the original cover price.
