= Laurence Bergreen =

American historian and author (born 1950)

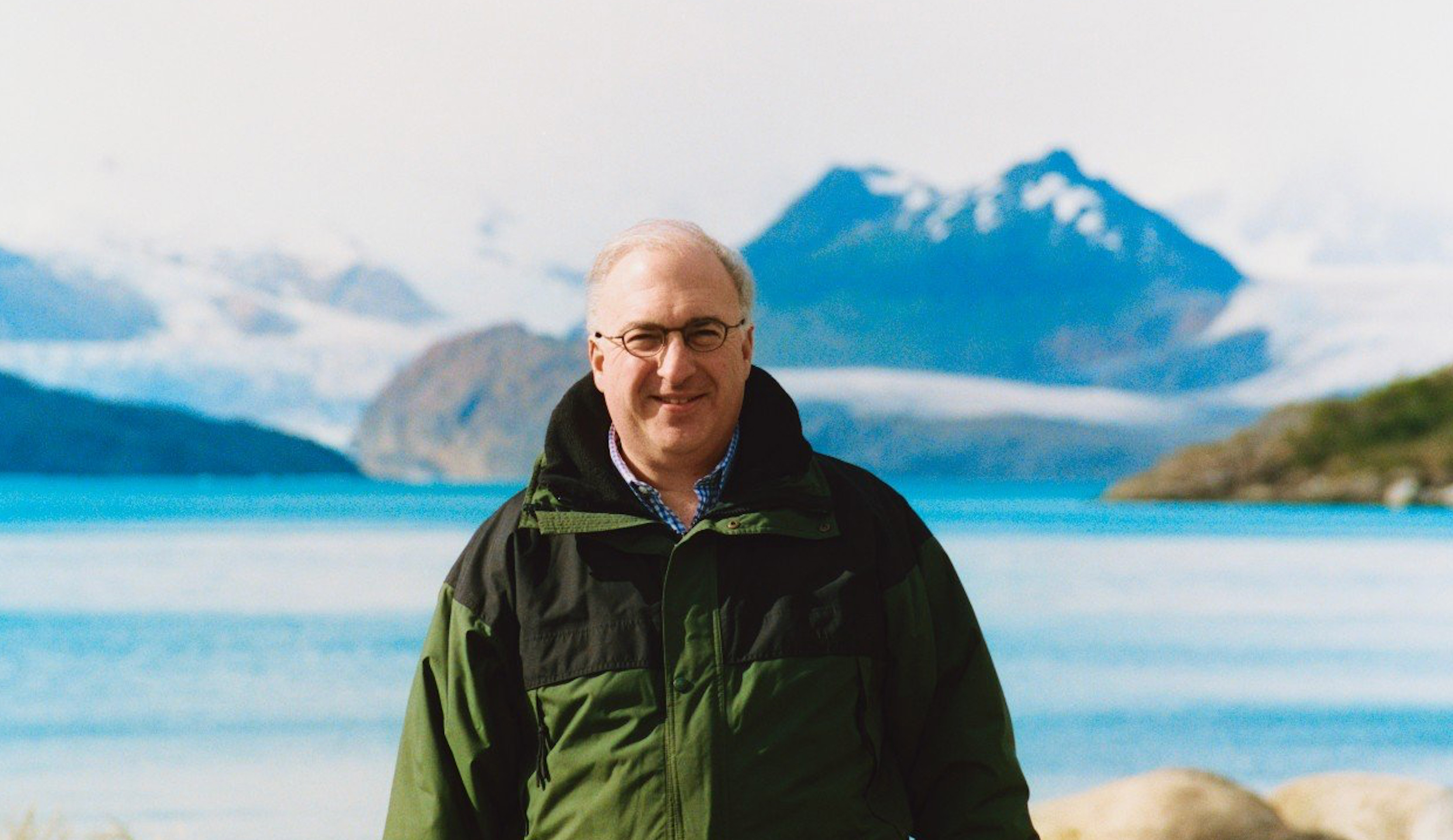
- Born: Laurence R. Bergreen; February 4, 1950 (age 76); New York City
- Occupation: Writer
- Writing career
- Period: 1980–present
- Genres: History, biography
- Notable works: Over the Edge of the World (2003), Capone: The Man and the Era (1994), Irving Berlin (1990)
- Website: laurencebergreenauthor.com

Laurence Bergreen (February 4, 1950–) is an American popular historian and biographer known for his narrative accounts of exploration, science, and cultural history. His works include biographies of Ferdinand Magellan, Marco Polo, and Louis Armstrong, as well as studies of NASA’s Mars missions. They have been widely read, and translated into multiple languages.

== Early life and education ==
Laurence Bergreen was born on February 4, 1950, in New York City. He graduated from Harvard University in 1972.

== Career ==
=== General ===
Bergreen worked in journalism, academia and broadcasting before publishing his first biography, James Agee: A Life. Bergreen has written for The New York Times, the Los Angeles Times, The Wall Street Journal, the Chicago Tribune, Newsweek, and Esquire.

Bergreen has written books on historical subjects, such as Voyage to Mars: NASA's Search for Life Beyond Earth, a narrative of NASA's exploration of Mars, and Over the Edge of the World: Magellan's Terrifying Circumnavigation of the Globe, as well as Marco Polo: From Venice to Xanadu.

Bergreen is a member of PEN American Center, The Explorers Club, the Authors Guild, and the Board of Trustees of the New York Society Library.

=== Specific associations ===
In 1995, he served as a judge for the National Book Awards, and in 1991 as a judge for the PEN/Albrand Nonfiction Award. A frequent lecturer at major universities and symposiums, and, on occasion, aboard cruise ships, he has served as a Featured Historian for the History Channel.

In 2007, Bergreen was asked by NASA to name some geological features surrounding the Victoria crater on Mars, based on places Ferdinand Magellan visited. In 2008, Bergreen was a keynote speaker at NASA's 50th anniversary event in Washington, D.C.

Bergreen has taught at the New School for Social Research, and served as Assistant to the President of the Museum of Television and Radio in New York.

=== Book authorships ===
Bergreen's first book was Look Now, Pay Later: The Rise of Network Broadcasting, published in 1980. His biography, James Agee: A Life, was a New York Times “Notable Book” for 1984. As Thousands Cheer: The Life of Irving Berlin, appeared in 1990; it was also a New York Times "Notable Book" for 1990.

In 1994, he published Capone: The Man and the Era. A Book-of-the-Month Club selection and a New York Times "Notable Book", it has been optioned by Miramax. In 1997, Bergreen published Louis Armstrong: An Extravagant Life, a biography drawing on unpublished manuscripts and interviews with Armstrong's colleagues and friends. It appeared on the “Best Books of 1997” lists of the San Francisco Chronicle, the Philadelphia Inquirer, and Publishers Weekly.

Bergreen is the author of Voyage to Mars: NASA’s Search for Life Beyond Earth, a narrative of NASA's exploration of Mars, published in November 2000. Dramatic rights were acquired by TNT.

His next work, Over the Edge of the World: Magellan’s Terrifying Circumnavigation of the Globe, was published in October 2003 and labeled a "Notable Book" for 2003 by The New York Times.

In October 2007, Bergreen published Marco Polo: From Venice to Xanadu, a biography of the iconic traveler.

His 2011 book is Columbus: The Four Voyages, a New York Times bestseller. It was a selection of the Book-of-the-Month Club, BOMC2, the History Book Club, and the Military Book Club, and was a New York Times Book Review "Editors Choice".

In 2016, he published Casanova: The World of a Seductive Genius, available from Simon & Schuster.

In May 2017, Roaring Brook Press, a division of Macmillan, published his first Young Adult book, Magellan: Over the Edge of the World, an adaptation of his international bestseller.

As of this date, his most recent adult book is In Search of a Kingdom: Francis Drake, Elizabeth I, and the Perilous Birth of the British Empire, from HarperCollins Publishers in March 2021.

== Published works ==
- Look Now, Pay Later: The Rise of Network Broadcasting (1980) ISBN 0385144652
- James Agee: A Life (1984) ISBN 0525242538
- As Thousands Cheer: The Life of Irving Berlin (1990) ISBN 0670818747
- Capone: The Man and the Era (1994) ISBN 0684824477
- Louis Armstrong: An Extravagant Life (1997) ISBN 0767901568
- Voyage to Mars: NASA's Search for Life Beyond Earth (2000) ISBN 157322166X
- The Quest for Mars: NASA Scientists and Their Search for Life Beyond Earth (2000) ISBN 0002570300 (hdc) (2001) ISBN 0006531342 (pbk)
- Over the Edge of the World: Magellan's Terrifying Circumnavigation of the Globe (2003) ISBN 006093638X
- Marco Polo: From Venice to Xanadu (2007) ISBN 1400078806
- Columbus: The Four Voyages (2011) ISBN 014312210X
- Casanova: The World of a Seductive Genius (2016) ISBN 1476716498
- Magellan: Over the Edge of the World, Young Adult Edition (2017) ISBN 9781626721203
- In Search of a Kingdom: Francis Drake, Elizabeth I, and the Perilous Birth of the British Empire (2021) ISBN 9780062875358
- Seven Voyages: How China's Treasure Fleet Conquered the Sea, with Sara Fray (2021) ISBN 9781626721227

== Awards and recognition ==
- Winner, ASCAP-Deems Taylor Award for Excellence in Music Journalism, 1990 for As Thousands Cheer
- First place, Ralph J. Gleason Music Book Award, 1991
- Medalla de Honor by the Asociación de Alcades de V Centenario (Spain) for Over the Edge of the World

== Personal life ==
As of this date, Bergreen lived in New York City.

Laurence Bergreen is married to Jacqueline Philomeno, from Brazil. He is the father of two children from his first marriage, Nicholas Bergreen (born in 1982) and Sara Bergreen (born in 1984).
