= List of The FBI Files episodes =

This is a list of episodes from the Discovery Channel crime documentary The FBI Files, which premiered on October 20, 1998 and ended on March 24, 2006.

== Series overview ==
Season	Episodes	Season premiere	Season finale
1	13	October 20, 1998	February 23, 1999
2	18	September 28, 1999	May 30, 2000
3	18	September 12, 2000	September 18, 2001
4	18	October 2, 2001	May 2002
5	18	October 15, 2002	May 27, 2003
6	18	September 20, 2003	May 7, 2004
7	18	2005	March 24, 2006

== Episodes ==
=== Season 1 (1998–1999) ===
No. overall	No. in season	Title	Directed by	Written by	Original release date	Prod. code
1	1	"Polly Klaas: Kidnapped"	Stuart Taylor	Richard Roughton	October 20, 1998	101
The solved kidnapping of Polly Klaas.
2	2	"Above the Law"	Robert H. Gardner	Lori Nelson	November 3, 1998	102
Police officer George Gwaltney, is the prime suspect in the death of Robin Bishop.
3	3	"Human Prey"	Joe Wiecha	Tim Baney	November 10, 1998	103
Serial sniper Thomas Dillon mercilessly hunted his unsuspecting victims in Ohio.
4	4	"Death in Alaska"	Stuart Taylor	Karen Gilmour	November 17, 1998	104
The solved case of Nancy Newman. Exposing Kirby Anthoney, the murderer who kept it in the family.
5	5	"Deadly Paradise"	Robert H. Gardner	Dean Love & Patrick Prentice	December 1, 1998	105
The solved case of millionaires Mac and Muff Graham, found deceased on Palmyra Atoll Island.
6	6	"The Crazy Don"	Stuart Taylor	Karen Gilmour & Howard B. Swartz	December 8, 1998	106
Vincent Gigante wandered the streets of New York wearing only pyjamas and a bathrobe, but the FBI were convinced this Mafia boss was anything but crazy.
7	7	"Killing Spree"	Joe Wiecha	Lisa Feit	December 29, 1998	107
Insight into the 1984 manhunt for serial killer Bobby Joe Long.
8	8	"Melissa Brannen: Missing"	Jeffery Fine	Lori Nelson	January 19, 1999	108
Caleb Hughes kidnaps Melissa Brannen at a Christmas party in 1989.
9	9	"The Unabomber"	Stuart Taylor	Tim Baney & Howard Swartz	January 26, 1999	109
Ted Kaczynski (aka The Unabomber) was convicted for a string of postal bombings that spanned two decades.
10	10	"Murdering Cowboy"	Clinton Jay High, Jr.	Lisa Feit & David O'Donnell	February 2, 1999	110
Mountain Man, Claude Dallas, always believed the rules didn't apply to him.
11	11	"The World Trade Center Bombing"	Joe Wiecha	Lisa Feit & Howard B. Swartz	February 9, 1999	111
The story of the 1993 World Trade Center bombing.
12	12	"John Gotti: Convicted"	David Haycox	Karen Gilmour & Howard B. Swartz	February 16, 1999	112
The investigation, arrest and eventual conviction of Gambino crime family boss John Gotti (aka The Teflon Don).
13	13	"The True Story of Mississippi Burning"	Jeffery Fine	Steven Zorn	February 23, 1999	113
Three civil rights workers go missing amid the tension of the civil rights movement and the growing presence of The KKK in Mississippi.

=== Season 2 (1999–2000) ===
No. overall	No. in season	Title	Directed by	Written by	Original release date	Prod. code
14	1	"A Model Killer"	Joe Wiecha	Tim Baney and Michael Martin	September 28, 1999	201
The search for Christopher Wilder - "The Beauty Queen Killer" in the 1980's.
15	2	"Hired Gun"	Joe Wiecha	Lisa Feit	October 5, 1999	202
The 1993 murder-for-hire investigation of former Motown Records music producer Lawrence Horn, contract-killer James Perry and the resulting controversy around the book Hit Man.
16	3	"Cat and Mouse"	Stuart Taylor	Daphna Rubin & Howard B. Swartz	October 12, 1999	203
The 1985 search for South Carolina serial killer Larry Gene Bell.
17	4	"Cracking the Cartel"	Jeffery Fine	David A. Taylor	October 19, 1999	204
The 1988 search for a drug trafficker and killer Genaro Ruiz Camacho.
18	5	"A Stranger in Town"	Jeffery Fine	Lisa Feit	November 2, 1999	205
The body of an unidentified young woman turns up on a highway in a small Pennsylvania town, this is Dawn Marie Birnbaum's story.
19	6	"Hunter's Game"	Stuart Taylor	Steven Zorn	November 23, 1999	206
The capture of Alaskan serial killer Robert Hansen.
20	7	"The Dixie Mafia"	Susan Mann	Jan Sommer & Howard B. Swartz	December 7, 1999	207
Investigation of the Dixie Mafia's involvement in the killings of Judge Vincent Sherry and his wife Margaret in Biloxi, Mississippi.
21	8	"Shattered Shield"	Stuart Taylor	David A. Taylor	December 14, 1999	208
Investigations of alleged corruption and drug trafficking within the New Orleans Police Department during the 1990's.
22	9	"Blood Brothers"	Jeffery Fine	Lauren Cardillo	December 28, 1999	209
A look at the Agofsky brothers' involvement in the 1989 Noel, Missouri bank robbery.
23	10	"Crime Spree"	Stuart Taylor	Daphna Rubin & Howard B. Swartz	January 11, 2000	210
The 1984 manhunt for spree killers Alton Coleman and Debra Denise Brown.
24	11	"Family Secrets"	Jeffery Fine	Lisa Feit	February 1, 2000	211
The December 1994 kidnappings of Joann Katrinak and her 4-month-old son, Alex. This was one of the first cases of DNA being successfully used in a criminal investigation in the United States.
25	12	"Master Plan"	Clinton Jay High, Jr.	Howard B. Swartz & Jan Sommer	March 14, 2000	212
The investigation of alleged Chicago Outfit activities in the Chicago suburb of Willow Springs, Illinois, resulting in the arrests of former Willow Springs police chief Michael J. Corbitt and prominent Chicago attorney Alan Masters for murder and racketeering.
26	13	"Firefight"	Joe Wiecha	Lisa Feit	March 26, 2000	213
The bank-robbery investigation leading to the 1986 FBI Miami shootout, one of the deadliest days in the history of the FBI.
27	14	"Killer Abroad"	Clinton Jay High, Jr.	Michael Martin	April 2, 2000	214
The FBI and Austrian Federal Police's investigation of suspected serial killer Jack Unterweger.
28	15	"Moving Target"	Susan Mann	David A. Taylor & Mark Marabella	April 9, 2000	215
The arrest, trial, and conviction of white supremacist serial killer Joseph Paul Franklin.
29	16	"Deadly Mission"	Bertrand Morin	Lauren Cardillo	May 2, 2000	216
The manhunt for white supremacist Chevie Kehoe.
30	17	"Cop Killer"	Joe Wiecha	Daphna Ruben & Mark Marabella	May 9, 2000	217
The 1995 murders of Prince George's County Police Department officer John Novabilski and FBI Special Agent William H. Christian Jr.
31	18	".22 Caliber Killer"	David Haycox	Michael Martin & Mark Marabella	May 30, 2000	218
The Joseph Christopher (aka The .22 Caliber Killer) investigation.

=== Season 3 (2000–2001) ===
No. overall	No. in season	Title	Directed by	Written by	Original release date	Prod. code
32	1	"Driven to Kill"	Stuart Taylor	Lisa Feit	September 12, 2000	301
The case of trucker Robert Rhoades and the well known murder of Regina Walters.
33	2	"Deadly Obsession"	David Haycox	Michael Martin & Mark Marabella	September 19, 2000	302
The 1996 disappearance of Anne Marie Fahey and the investigation into Delaware attorney Thomas J. Capano.
34	3	"First and Kennedy Street Crew"	Stuart Taylor	Lauren Cardillo & Howard B. Swartz	October 17, 2000	303
The gangs of Washington, D.C. brought devastation to the streets of America's capital.
35	4	"Terror in Disguise"	David Haycox & Bertrand Morin	Michael Ray Brown & Mark Marabella	November 21, 2000	304
The four-year manhunt for the 'Hollywood' Bank Robber in Seattle.
36	5	"Deadly Trail"	Stuart Taylor	Lisa Feit & Mark Marabella	November 28, 2000	305
The 1987 manhunt for serial killer Darren Dee O'Neall.
37	6	"The Predator"	Bertrand Morin	Steven Zorn	December 2000	306
The case of Frank Atwood who kidnapped 8 year old, Vicki Lynne Hoskinson.
38	7	"Dishonored"	Jeffery Fine	Peter G. Gillespie & David O'Donnell & Allison Erkelens & Mark Marabella	January 9, 2001	307
The 1989 disappearance of USMC Capt. Shirley Russell, and the joint FBI – NIS investigation of her husband, former USMC Capt. Robert Russell.
39	8	"Millionaire Murder"	Clinton Jay High, Jr.	Michael Martin & David O'Donnell	January 16, 2001	308
The 1996 disappearance of New Jersey millionaire Frank Lee Black Jr.
40	9	"Deadly Business"	Jeffery Fine	Lisa Feit & Mark Marabella	February 20, 2001	309
The joint FBI & NYPD 'R.I.C.O.' investigation of New York City gas-station mogul Gurmeet Singh Dhinsa.
41	10	"Temple of Fear"	David Haycox	Steven Zorn & David O'Donnell & Michael Marabella	March 6, 2001	310
The 'R.I.C.O.' investigation of the Nation of Yahweh and its former leader, Yahweh ben Yahweh.
42	11	"Silent Strike"	J. Darin Wales	Michael Martin & David O'Donnell	April 3, 2001	311
The attack on armoured van driver John Magosh by Timothy Ring and his accomplices.
43	12	"Deadly Stranger"	David Haycox	Cynthia Smith Anderson & David O'Donnell	April 24, 2001	312
The 1995 search for serial killer Glen Rogers: 'The Cross-Country Killer'.
44	13	"Backstage Murder"	Stuart Taylor	David Bruskin & Mark Marabella	May 1, 2001	313
The Chippendales murder-for-hire controversy.
45	14	"Under Fire"	David Haycox	Lisa Feit & Mark Marabella	May 8, 2001	314
A look at the 1981 Brink's robbery and the resulting manhunt for Mutulu Shakur and the others involved in the heist.
46	15	"Manhunt"	Stuart Taylor	Cynthia Smith Anderson & David O'Donnell	July 17, 2001	315
The case of convict Danny Ray Horning and his later prison escape.
47	16	"Hunter's Target"	Bertrand Morin	Michael Ray Brown & Mark Marabella	August 14, 2001	316
The 1983 murder of the teenager David Wilkey.
48	17	"No Remorse"	John Kavanaugh	Michael Ray Brown & David O'Donnell	August 21, 2001	317
The case centring around criminals Jeffrey Barnes and Kenneth Jones.
49	18	"The C-11 Squad"	Jeffery Fine	David O'Donnell & Steven Zorn	September 18, 2001	318
The Racketeer Influenced and Corrupt Organizations Act (RICO) investigation of New York City drug kingpin Clarence Heatley during the late 1980s.

=== Season 4 (2001–2002) ===
No. overall	No. in season	Title	Directed by	Written by	Original release date	Prod. code
50	1	"The Search for Lisa Rene"	Gary Meyers	Lisa Feit & Mark Marabella	October 2, 2001	401
The drug related kidnapping of 16-year-old Lisa Rene.
51	2	"Hidden Agenda"	John Kavanaugh	David N. Burskin & Michael Martin	October 9, 2001	402
In the mid 90s, professional bank robbers raid cities across seven states, always leaving bombs to terrorize their victims.
52	3	"Small Town Terror"	J. Darin Wales	Stephan Cooper & Mark Marabella	October 30, 2001	403
Labor Day weekend turns into a nightmare as a cross-country crime spree terrorizes the nation.
53	4	"A Family Torn"	Gary Meyers	Michael Ray Brown & Mark Marabella	October 30, 2001	404
A parent's worst nightmare unfolds when a class field trip ends with an 11-year-old girl missing.
54	5	"Vanished"	David Haycox	Lisa Feit & Mark Marabella & David O'Donnell	November 27, 2001	405
The case of Newton Alfred Winn who kidnapped Annie Hearin for a ransom payment.
55	6	"Deadly Heist"	Stuart Taylor	Michael Martin & Mark Marabella	December 4, 2001	406
The Arizona armored van robbery and murders committed by Michael and Patrick Poland.
56	7	"Unlawful Flight"	Stuart Taylor	Stephan Cooper & Mark Marabella	January 15, 2002	407
The escape of two fugitives from federal custody and their subsequent flight across several states.
57	8	"Deadly Secrets"	Bertrand Morin	Lauren Cardillo & Allison Erkelens & Mark Marabella & David O'Donnell	January 29, 2002	408
The 1992 murder of Sara Tokars, and the resulting murder-for-hire and Racketeer Influenced and Corrupt Organizations Act (RICO) investigations of her husband, wealthy Atlanta attorney Fred Tokars.
58	9	"Death in the Delta"	Greg Francis	Steven Zorn	February 12, 2002	409
The abduction, robbery, and murder of Shannon Sanderson after winning thousands at a Mississippi casino.
59	10	"Lost Boys"	Jeffery Fine	Stephan Cooper	February 26, 2002	410
The multi-state crime spree committed by Jamie McMahan and Christopher Kauffman.
60	11	"Deadly Threat"	Stuart Taylor	Lisa Feit & Mark Marabella	March 12, 2002	411
The story of Florida drug dealer Jeff Matthews who committed the only bombing of a DEA office on American soil.
61	12	"Evil Intent"	John Kavanaugh	Michael Martin & Mark Marabella	March 19, 2002	412
The 1998 Kokomo, Indiana kidnapping of Anita Wooldridge by convicted sex offender Victor Steele, and her subsequent rescue by the FBI in La Crosse, Wisconsin.
62	13	"The Coffee Shop Murders"	John Kavanaugh	Steven Zorn & Mark Marabella	March 26, 2002	413
What seemed to be a senseless act of violence soon grew into a crime of federal proportions.
63	14	"Without Remorse"	Jeffery Fine	Lisa Feit & Mark Marabella	April 3, 2002	414
The case of FBI top ten fugitive Mike Wayne Jackson who murdered his parole officer.
64	15	"Global Pursuit"	Joe Wiecha	Stephan Cooper & Mark Marabella	April 10, 2002	415
The four-year international manhunt for terrorist Mir Aimal Kasi, perpetrator of the 1993 shootings at the headquarters of the Central Intelligence Agency in Langley, Virginia
65	16	"Betrayed"	Bertrand Morin	Mark Caras & Mark Marabella	April 17, 2002	416
In Kentucky, the 1992 abduction and murder of Scotty Baker by his own stepmother.
66	17	"When Seconds Count"	Greg Francis	Lisa Feit & Mark Marabella	May 2002	417
When a 12-year-old girl is abducted from her home in Lodi, California, local police and FBI agents converge on the field where her kidnapper's car is found abandoned.
67	18	"Held for Ransom"	J. Darin Wales	Michael Martin & Mark Marabella	May 2002	418
The case of millionaire's daughter Amy McNeil. Held hostage as her father delivers the ransom, a fatal FBI shoot-out ensues.

=== Season 5 (2002–2003) ===
No. overall	No. in season	Title	Directed by	Written by	Original release date	Prod. code
68	1	"The Price of Greed"	Stuart Taylor	Mark Caras & Mark Marabella	October 15, 2002	501
The 1997 Los Angeles Dunbar armored robbery, the largest cash heist in United States history. Six masked robbers stole $18.9 million.
69	2	"Caught In The Act"	David Haycox	David O'Donnell & Michael Martin	February 5, 2003	502
Chronicling an investigation that took authorities across Alabama to Virginia in search of cousins suspected in seven deaths, robbery and possession of multiple firearms.
70	3	"In Pursuit"	J. Darin Wales	Paul Sauer & David O'Donnell	February 19, 2003	503
A Nebraska sheriff's deputy sees a man wanted for firearms violations and tries to arrest him. But the man begins shooting, leading to a high-speed pursuit and wounded cops. The FBI helps track the man across state lines.
71	4	"High Stakes"	J. Darin Wales	Steven Zorn & David O'Donnell	February 25, 2003	504
The Maghfoor Mansoor case.
72	5	"Home Invaders"	Greg Francis	Lisa Feit & David O'Donnell	December 10, 2002	505
After two serial bank robbers escape from police custody, FBI agents familiar with the bandits believe that they would attempt a grand-scale heist.
73	6	"Tracks Of A Killer"	Jeffery Fine	Allison Erkelens & David O'Donnell & Steven Zorn	February 4, 2003	506
In the summer of 1999, Texas was terrorized by a brutal serial killer who traveled by train. The FBI assembled a task force to gather information about the dangerous drifter and create a profile that would help locate him.
74	7	"Lawless"	J. Darin Wales	Mark Caras & David O'Donnell	March 18, 2003	507
When a Boston police officer is killed by a most-wanted man after investigating a domestic dispute, the Bureau leaves no stone unturned in the search for the culprit.
75	8	"Cruel Revenge"	Craig Sexton	Paul Sauer & David O'Donnell	April 15, 2003	508
The son of a successful Miami real estate developer is kidnapped.
76	9	"Held Hostage"	John Kavanaugh	Peter Koper & David O'Donnell	May 6, 2003	509
In October 1995, a South Carolina family is taken hostage as part of an elaborately planned bank robbery.
77	10	"The Initiation"	Joe Wiecha	Mila S. Marvizon & David O'Donnell	June 17, 2003	510
After discovering a night deposit bag with thousands of dollars in the vehicle, police knew that robbery was not the motive and began to investigate other possibilities.
78	11	"Dark Woods"	Greg Francis	Greg Raver-Lampman	May 27, 2003	511
In June 1973, a young girl was abducted from a state park on the Missouri River while camping with her family. Several months passed with no leads, then an FBI agent took a particular interest in the case.
79	12	"Domestic Terror"	Jeffery Fine	Paul Ordnung	July 1, 2003	512
In 1996, a group of political extremists twice robbed a bank in Washington, using home-made bombs and military precision to escape.
80	13	"Fatal Friendship"	David Haycox	Greg Raver-Lampman & Elisa M. Rothstein & David O'Donnell	September 2, 2003	513
A man returned to his Memphis home and discovered that his wife was missing.
81	14	"Death Pact"	Louie Maggiotto	Mila S. Marvizon & David O'Donnell	August 2003	514
In the 1990s, Chicago police and the FBI were on the trail of a bank robber whose hold-ups were becoming increasingly violent.
82	15	"Broken Trust"	John Wells	Mark Harris & David O'Donnell	August 2003	515
In 1988, new light was shed on the mysterious death of a South Carolina farmer when a criminal confessed that two prominent community members hired him to commit murder.
83	16	"Criminal Enterprise"	Darrell Stone	Paul Ordnung	November 4, 2003	516
A masked gunman robs a California bank and escapes after a standoff with police. Months later, when a jeweler is robbed and kidnapped, a tip links the crimes.
84	17	"Fateful Crossing"	J. Darin Wales	Matt LaBarge & Tom Naughton & David O'Donnell	November 11, 2003	517
In January 1984, a US Customs official disappears from his post near the Texas border crossing, prompting local police to search for four Latin American suspects driving a Pontiac Grand Prix.
85	18	"Deadly Influence"	Joe Wiecha	Mark Harris	December 2, 2003	518
Investigations of alleged corruption and drug trafficking within the Miami Police Department during the 1980s.
86	19	"Dangerous Company"	Joe Wiecha	Joseph Amodio	December 16, 2003	519
(Two hour special) In the 1980's, former police officer Andrew C. Thornton II smuggled massive amounts of cocaine from Colombia to the United States in specially-designed airplanes. Following Thornton's death after a fall to earth, FBI investigators uncovered a complex web of greed, deception, and murder.

=== Special (2003) ===
Title	Directed by	Written by	Original release date
"Flight from Justice: The Story of D.B. Cooper"	Joe Wiecha	Joseph Amodio & Mike Sinclair	2003
The D. B. Cooper case.

=== Season 6 (2003–2004) ===
No. overall	No. in season	Title	Directed by	Written by	Original release date	Prod. code
86	1	"Without Mercy"	Joe Wiecha	Matt LaBarge & Steven Zorn & Tom Naughton & David O'Donnell	October 15, 2002	601
No viable witnesses are left behind following a Richmond bank robbery.
87	2	"Dead Run"	J. Darin Wales & David Haycox	Tom Naughton & David O'Donnell & Mark Harris	October 15, 2002	602
A man is found suffocated in his home with his checkbook, credit cards and vehicle stolen.
88	3	"Brutal Abduction"	Joe Wiecha	Greg Raver-Lampman & David O'Donnell	October 15, 2002	603
An innocent Milwaukee teen is kidnapped and held for ransom by a Chicago gang.
89	4	"Radical Agenda"	J. Darin Wales & David Haycox & Joe Wiecha	Allison Erkelens & Cherise Ellingsworth	October 15, 2002	604
New Jersey state trooper Philip Lamonaco is shot dead on duty.
90	5	"The Killing Zone"	David Haycox	Kevin Barry & Allison Erkelens	February 5, 2003	502
An investigation into the violent activities of the "K Street Crew."
91	6	"Deadly Takeover"	David Haycox	David O'Donnell & Ruth Golden	February 19, 2003	503
A string of bank robberies in Seattle lead to a criminal mastermind.
92	7	"The Perfect Heist"	John Kavanaugh	Ruth Golden & David O'Donnell	February 25, 2003	504
The United California Bank robbery, in which over $8 million in cash and other valuables were stolen.
93	8	"Brotherhood of Hate"	Joe Wiecha	Allison Erkelens & Joe Wiecha	December 10, 2002	608
The FBI's operations against the Covenant, The Sword, and the Arm of the Lord white supremacist group, preempted by the 1984 murder of Arkansas State Trooper Louis Perry Bryant by Richard Wayne Snell.
94	9	"Killer Instinct"	Joe Wiecha	Miranda Leigh	February 4, 2003	609
Following a series of violent carjackings in 1992 in the Washington DC area, agents discover a pattern.
95	10	"The Atlanta Prison Riot"	David Haycox	Mark Kadin & Allison Erkelens	August 2004	610
The FBI is forced to negotiate with hostile prisoners when Cuban inmates at the Atlanta Federal Prison start setting fires.
96	11	"No Place To Hide"	Joe Wiecha	Joe Wiecha	June 2004	611
In the spring of 1997, a killer who preyed on senior citizens terrorized the sleepy town of River Parishes, Louisiana.
97	12	"A Bitter End"	Darrell Stone	Miranda Leigh & Allison Erkelens	August 2004	612
The 1998 Bank of America robbery, the largest bank robbery in Las Vegas history.
98	13	"Dangerous Gamble"	Tim Russ	Jerome Delayen & Miranda Leigh	August 2004	613
Two masked robbers armed with semi-automatic weapons robbed armoured car couriers of $350,000 in the MGM Grand Hotel and Casino in Las Vegas.
99	14	"Dangerous Takedown"	Joe Wiecha	Miranda Leigh & Allison Erkelens	September 2004	614
In 1997, two burglars broke into a home and shot at a police officer. One year later, clues to the location of the suspects are revealed.
100	15	"Inside the Bureau"	Bertrand Morin & David Haycox & Joe Wiecha & John Kavanaugh & Rob Gardner & Stuart Taylor	Jerome Delayen & David O'Donnell	May 2005	615
A look back in previous cases to learn about Investigative techniques and innovations used by the FBI.
101	16	"Radical Resistance"	David Haycox	Miranda Leigh & Allison Erkelens	November 2004	513
Croatians seek to secure Croatia's sovereignty via terrorism.
102	17	"Forced Entry"	Stuart Taylor	Jerome Delayen & Miranda Leigh	November 2004	514
In 1994, a rash of masked robberies plagued the Detroit area. When one homeowner shot back, the identity of the intruders was revealed.
103	18	"Operation Goldenrod"	John Kavanaugh	Allison Erkelens & Cherise Ellingsworth	February 2005	515
In Beirut armed extremists seize a plane and terrorise everyone on board. The CIA undertakes a daring operation to stop the hijackers.
104	19	"Cruel Deception"	Stuart Taylor	Michael Ray Brown	2005	516
A Special two-hour episode set about Mike DeBardeleben. Following his release from prison, the counterfeiter’s dark obsessions spiral out of control. What starts as a simple scheme to print money escalates to serial rape and ends in a sequence of brutal murders.
105	20	"Deadly Dentist"	Joe Wiecha	Michael Ray Brown	January 1, 2005	517
A Special two-hour episode set about dentist and serial killer Dr. Glennon Engleman.
106	21	"Dangerous Pursuit"	Joe Wiecha	Mike Sinclair & Tom Naughton & D.P. Roberts	January 1, 2005	518
The manhunt for serial killer Paul John Knowles.

=== Season 7 (2005–2006) ===
No. overall	No. in season	Title	Directed by	Written by	Original release date	Prod. code
107	1	"Voice of Terror"	Stuart Taylor	Allison Erkelens & Miranda Leigh	2005	701
The Omega 7 terrorist group.
108	2	"Dangerous Cause"	Joe Wiecha	Miranda Leigh	April 9, 2005	702
The FALN Puerto Rican separatist group.
109	3	"The Great Philly Mob War"	Joe Wiecha	Joe Wiecha	July 19, 2005	703
Early 1990s Racketeer Influenced and Corrupt Organizations Act (RICO) investigations of high-ranking individuals within the Philadelphia Outfit, including John Stanfa and Joseph Merlino.
110	4	"The Shootist"	Bertrand Morin	David O'Donnell	July 26, 2005	704
The 8-year search for serial bank robber Johnny Madison Williams Jr. (aka "The Shootist").
111	5	"Rebellion in Paradise"	Joe Wiecha	Miranda Leigh	September 2005	705
The Los Macheteros terrorist organization.
112	6	"Terror For Sale"	Joe Wiecha	Allison Erkelens	August 2005	706
Jeff Fort and the Chicago El Rukn street gang's failed attempts to conspire with Libya to perform acts of domestic terrorism for money during the mid-1980s.
113	7	"Death of a Diplomat"	Joe Wiecha	Miranda Leigh	September 2005	707
The 1976 assassination of Orlando Letelier, the former Chilean Ambassador to the United States, by Chilean DINA agents.
114	8	"Deadly Payout"	Joe Wiecha	Allison Erkelens	August 2005	708
A copy machine, placed in a busy Lake Tahoe casino, is actually a bomb.
115	9	"Operation Seaload"	Bertrand Morin	David O'Donnell	July 2005	709
The 1991 Organized Crime Drug Enforcement Task Force sting operation targeted at arresting and indicting members of the Medellín Cartel active in New York City.
116	10	"Crackdown"	Joe Wiecha	Allison Erkelens & Cherise Ellingsworth	September 2005	710
The 1988 murder of NYPD Officer Edward Byrne, and the Racketeer Influenced and Corrupt Organizations Act (RICO) investigation of drug kingpins Howard "Pappy" Mason and Lorenzo "Fat Cat" Nichols.
117	11	"Brothers Betrayed"	Joe Wiecha	Miranda Leigh	September 2005	711
The murder of a government witness in Puerto Rico leads to the takedown of a group of corrupt police officers.
118	12	"Stolen Identity"	David Haycox	Allison Erkelens	October 1, 2005	712
The multistate investigation of a violent identity theft ring.
119	13	"Robin the Hood"	Joe Wiecha	David O'Donnell	February 17, 2006	713
The hunt for bank robber Byron Chubbuck.
120	14	"Independence Day Breakout"	David Haycox	Allison Erkelens	February 24, 2006	714
On July 4, 1987, seven inmates broke out of a high-security prison in New Mexico. The daring escape was orchestrated by convicted murderer William Wayne Gilbert, who was serving a life sentence. In a dangerous manhunt and race against time, authorities and scientists used the Bureau's crime laboratory to catch these dangerous criminals.
121	15	"Bad Company"	Stuart Taylor	Paul Sauer	March 3, 2006	715
FBI agents and local police track a gang of robbers who specialize in armored car take-downs. As the robberies grow more violent, agents launch a complex sting to trap a deadly ring of thieves and shut down their dangerous operation.
122	16	"The Ivy League Murders"	David Haycox	Allison Erkelens	March 10, 2006	716
Dartmouth Professors Susanne and Half Zantop are mysteriously found murdered in their quaint New Hampshire home. Colleagues confirm that the couple was very well liked. With no trace of forced entry the FBI Behavioral Science Unit investigates the crime.
123	17	"Sniper at Home"	John Kavanaugh	Paul Sauer	March 17, 2006	717
A series of bizarre shootings terrorized the small town of East Point, Georgia and left two people dead and two others critically wounded. As the body count climbed, the killer taunted law enforcement with mysterious notes. FBI agents believed the shooter would continue until he was dead or behind bars.
124	18	"Final Takedown"	David Haycox	Allison Erkelens & Miranda Leigh	March 24, 2006	718
In the early 1990s, a gang based in the U.S. Virgin Islands smuggled large amounts of cocaine into mainland America. Police and federal agents targeted the violent group, but its leader remained a mystery. In an investigation spanning from Georgia to South America, police, the DEA and the FBI worked together to take down this dangerous drug ring.
