= Víctor Manuel Gerena =

American bank robber and fugitive (born 1958)

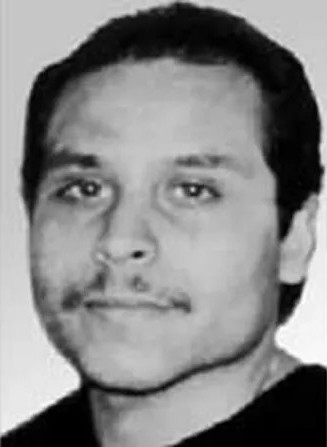
- Photograph taken in 1983

FBI Ten Most Wanted Fugitive
- Charges: Unlawful Flight to Avoid Prosecution; Armed robbery; Theft from Interstate Shipment
- Reward: $1,000,000
- Alias: Víctor Ortiz, Víctor M. Gerena Ortiz

Description
- Born: Víctor Manuel Gerena; June 24, 1958 (age 68); New York City, U.S.
- Nationality: American (Puerto Rican descent)
- Height: 5 ft 6 in (1.68 m)
- Weight: 169 lb (77 kg)
- Occupation: Security guard

Status
- Added: May 14, 1984
- Removed: December 15, 2016
- Number: 386
- Removed from Top Ten Fugitive List

Víctor Manuel Gerena (born June 24, 1958) is an American fugitive wanted by the FBI for the September 1983 White Eagle armed robbery, as a Wells Fargo employee and a member of the Boricua Popular Army, of a Wells Fargo armored car facility. The more than US$7 million (equivalent to more than $22.6 million in 2025) was the largest cash robbery in U.S. history at that time.

On May 14, 1984, Gerena became the 386th fugitive to be placed on the FBI's Top Ten Most Wanted Fugitives list. He remains at large, and on April 11, 2010, became the fugitive to have spent the most time on the list, surpassing Donald Eugene Webb, who was removed from the list on March 31, 2007, after 25 years, 10 months, and 27 days after Webb was presumed dead. Gerena was removed from the list on December 15, 2016, after 32 years. He is believed to be living in Cuba.

== Bank heist ==
According to law enforcement authorities, on September 12, 1983, Gerena dropped off his girlfriend at Hartford City Hall, where she was to get a marriage license for the couple. He then went to work and spent the rest of the day with co-workers James McKeon and Timothy Girard. At some point, Gerena removed McKeon's gun, handcuffed and tied up his two co-workers, and injected them with aspirin and water in order to further disable them (Gerena thought it would make them sleepy), which did not work. He put $7,000,000 in the trunk of a car, then left with the money.

== Fugitive ==
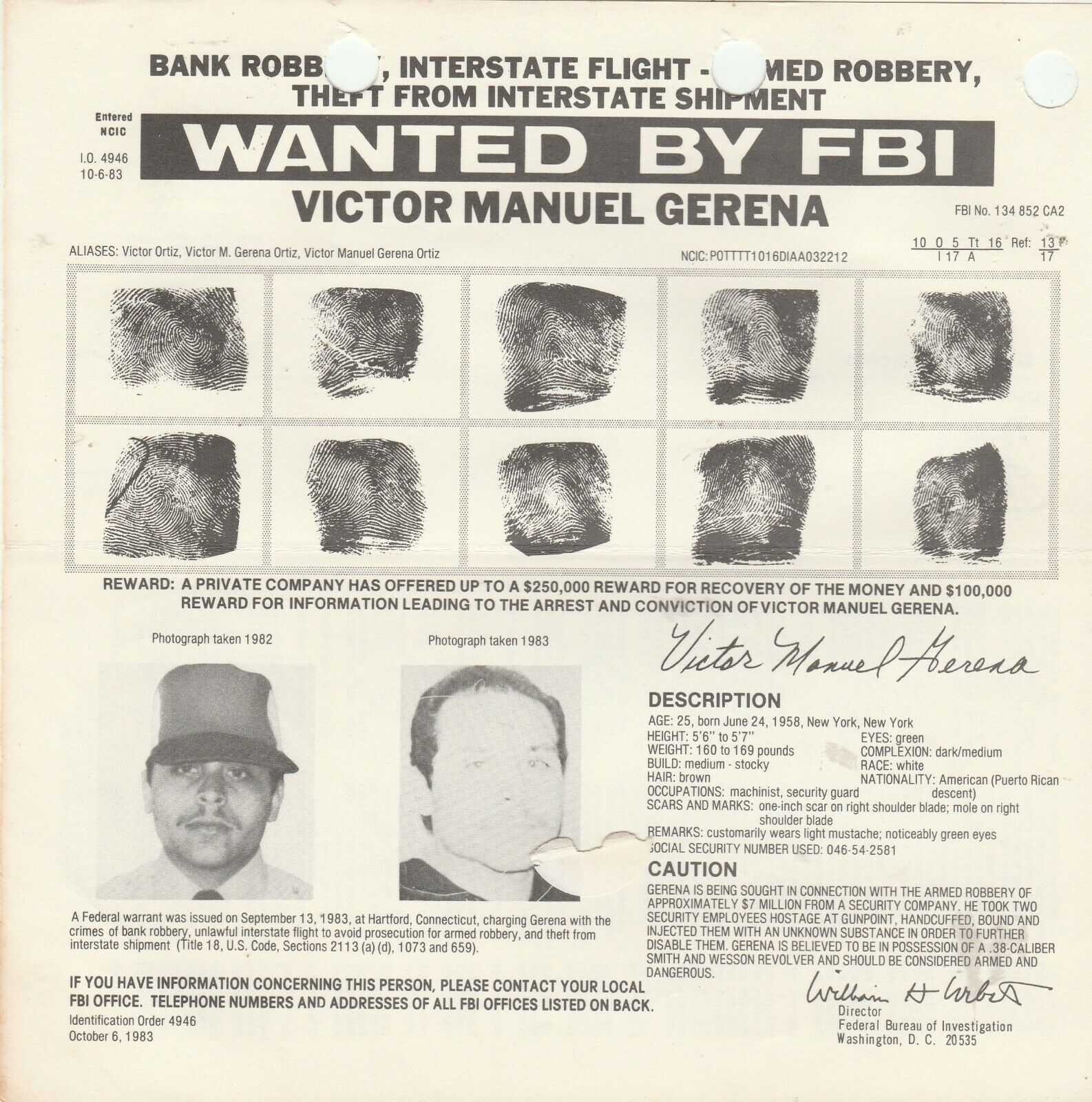
FBI Wanted Poster of Gerena, 1984

According to published reports, Gerena was transported to Mexico, where he boarded a Cubana de Aviación jet at Mexico City International Airport in Mexico City, arriving at José Martí International Airport in Havana. Years later, a cousin of Gerena accompanied journalist Edmund Mahoney to Cuba in an attempt to locate Gerena, but they did not succeed. Mahoney published a story in 2001 titled "Chasing Gerena".

== See also ==
- List of fugitives from justice who disappeared
