= Gurmeet Singh Dhinsa =

Indian-American criminal (born 1962)

Gurmeet Singh Dhinsa (born c. 1962) is an American Sikh former gas station magnate, who was convicted of racketeering and multiple murders. In an attempt to corner the local market on gas stations, Dhinsa defrauded customers, evaded taxes, committed at least two murders, and is believed to have ordered eight others. He is serving a sentence of life imprisonment without the possibility of release in a federal prison.

== Early life ==
Dhinsa was born to a Sikh family, in Punjab. and emigrated to the Bronx in 1982. He worked as a car-wash attendant until he was able to purchase a filling station of his own. As business improved, Dhinsa's holding company, Citygas Gasoline Corp "City Gas" opened more stations in New York, New Jersey, and Pennsylvania. At its height, City Gas had 51 locations and 300 employees, with annual revenues of $100 million.

== Criminal activities ==
When Dhinsa leased his first gas station in 1984, neighborhood residents were illegally using the lot to park their cars. According to a witness, Dhinsa smashed every windshield with a baseball bat. The cars were moved, and the gas station became profitable.

As he expanded his business, Dhinsa modified gas pumps, evaded taxes on gasoline bought in bulk, and kept his employees silent with death threats. He was arrested in 1990 on suspicion of kidnapping, robbery, and assault, but served only 90 days by pleading guilty to a weapons charge. In 1993, he was convicted of weapons charges again and served a year in prison.

In July 1995, Dhinsa ordered associates to kidnap an employee he suspected of stealing. When the victim's brother came looking for him in early 1997, Dhinsa ordered his murder. This killing was reported to police by several residents of the neighborhood. Police discovered that Dhinsa's brother Gurdip, who had fled to India to avoid prosecution for a 1991 murder, was back in the U.S. and was working at City Gas. On May 16, 1997, police surrounded the City Gas headquarters and arrested three employees, including Gurdip. When Gurmeet Dhinsa arrived at the scene, he was held for questioning and released. Although Dhinsa was released, a task force was formed to look into his operation, including the investigation of several disappearances and unsolved homicides. The kidnapped employee was never found.

On July 1, 1997, police were called by a man who claimed Dhinsa had threatened him and his family. Later that day, investigators stopped Dhinsa and searched the car he was driving. When Dhinsa opened the trunk, the police discovered circuit boards for gas pumps.

== Arrest and trial ==
Police arrested Dhinsa on July 7, 1997. At the same time, Dhinsa's car was seized and inventoried. Evidence of gas pump tampering, including Department of Consumer Affairs metal seals and inspection stickers, was found during the search.

On August 22, 1997, Dhinsa was indicted by a grand jury on 29 counts including racketeering, murder, conspiracy to commit murder, attempted murder, kidnapping, and witness intimidation.

Dhinsa was represented by high-profile defense attorney Gerald Shargel, but was found guilty of murder and racketeering after an eight-week trial. Although the prosecution sought the death penalty, the jury turned down the request and Dhinsa was sentenced to life imprisonment without the possibility of parole. In addition, Dhinsa was forced to pay $1.75 million in restitution and fines—$625,000 to the family of each victim as well as a separate $500,000 fine to the city—and his businesses were auctioned by the government to cover civil fines.

Dhinsa is currently serving a life sentence at FCI Schuylkill.

== Television ==
The story of the police investigation and prosecution of Dhinsa is the subject of an episode of The FBI Files entitled "Deadly Business" (Season 3, Episode 9).
