= Joseph Christopher =

American serial killer (1955–1993)

- Christopher in 1981
- Born: Joseph Gerard Christopher; July 26, 1955; Buffalo, New York, U.S.
- Died: March 1, 1993 (aged 37); Attica Correctional Facility, New York, U.S.
- Other names: The .22-Caliber Killer; The Midtown Slasher
- Motive: Racism
- Conviction: Second degree murder (3 counts)
- Penalty: 60 years to life imprisonment

Details
- Victims: 19 (12 killed, 7 survived)
- Span of crimes: September 22, 1980 – January 18, 1981
- Country: United States
- States: New York, Georgia
- Date apprehended: January 18, 1981

Joseph Gerard Christopher (July 26, 1955 – March 1, 1993), also known as the Midtown Slasher and the .22 Caliber Killer, was an American serial killer who committed a series of stabbings and shootings against African American men and boys, killing twelve and injuring seven, between 1980 and 1981 in various New York cities and towns.

== Early life ==
Joseph Gerard Christopher was born in Buffalo, New York on July 26, 1955, as the only son born to Therese (née Hurley) and Nicholas Christopher. His mother was a registered nurse, and his father was a maintenance worker with the city's Sanitation Department. Joseph had two older sisters and one younger sister. Nicholas was an outdoorsman and hunter who taught Joseph how to shoot and handle weapons at a young age; according to friends, Joseph had a passion for the outdoors which exceeded all of his other interests.

He enrolled in the automotive mechanics program at Burgard Vocational High School in 1971. He was remembered as a quiet student who did well in his shop courses before dropping out in early 1974, and was said to be "very intelligent, though he wasn't book-smart." He then worked a series of odd jobs before securing employment as a maintenance man at Canisius College, where he shared a midnight shift with a co-worker. He was fired in March 1979 for sleeping on the job and returned to live with his parents.

Christopher, diagnosed with paranoid schizophrenia, reached out for assistance after noticing his mental health slipping in 1978. He tried to admit himself to the Buffalo Psychiatric Center in September 1980. The Psychiatric Center staff told him he was not a danger to himself or others and so could not be admitted. This was a common practice at a time when such centers were being downsized. Instead, the center officials recommended counseling therapy. Fourteen days after he left the center, the killings began.

== Murders ==
Christopher's murder spree began on September 22, 1980, when he killed three black men and one boy in the space of 36 hours with a .22 caliber sawed-off Ruger 10/22 semi-automatic rifle concealed in a brown paper bag. These murders led to the media epithet of the .22-Caliber Killer. A 14-year-old boy, Glenn Dunn, was the first victim, shot outside a supermarket in Buffalo on September 22. Harold Green, 32, was shot the next day while dining at a fast food restaurant in Cheektowaga. That same evening in Buffalo, 30 year old Emmanuel Thomas was shot while crossing the street to his home, only 7 blocks away from Glenn Dunn's murder. On September 24, Joseph McCoy was shot to death in Niagara Falls.

He committed two more murders on October 8 and October 9, both times bludgeoning his victims to death and then cutting their hearts out. The bloodied, beaten, and mutilated body of 71 year old Parler Edwards was found in the trunk of his taxi cab parked in Amherst on October 8. Forty-year-old Ernest Jones was found in similar condition beside the Niagara River in Tonawanda on October 9. Jones' blood-spattered taxi was found 3 miles away in Buffalo.

Collin Cole, 37, was attacked in a Buffalo hospital on October 10. A white man matching the description of the .22 Caliber Killer tried to strangle him to death. Cole said the man snarled, "I hate niggers" at him before trying to kill him. He was saved by the arrival of a nurse, and though severe damage had been done to his throat, he survived the attack.

These initial murders went unsolved at first, and Christopher enlisted in the United States Army in November, and was stationed at Fort Benning. He soon received Christmas furlough and arrived in Manhattan on December 20, where, on December 22, he committed four more murders and two more attacks; this time stabbing his victims to death, thus earning the moniker of the Midtown Slasher. Twenty-five year old John Adams was stabbed at around 11:30 a.m., but survived. About two hours later, 32 year old Ivan Frazier was attacked. He managed to deflect the blade with his hand, suffering only minor injuries. Luis Rodriguez, 19, was the first murder of the day; at around 3:30 p.m., he was stabbed to death. At 6:50 p.m., 30 year old Antone Davis was stabbed to death. Around 4 hours later, 20 year old Richard Renner was stabbed and killed. Finally, Carl Ramsey was stabbed with a knife while on the subway at around 11 p.m., and died from his injuries before midnight.

Christopher then returned to Buffalo and fatally stabbed another black man, 31-year-old Roger Adams, on December 29 and 26-year-old Wendell Barnes in Rochester on December 30. He committed three additional attacks in Buffalo on New Year's Eve and New Year's Day (Albert Menefee, Larry Little, and Calvin Crippen), but all three victims survived. Christopher then returned to Fort Benning in January 1981.

When back at Fort Benning, Christopher attacked a fellow black soldier with a paring knife in what was described as an unprovoked attack on January 18. The soldier survived the attack and Christopher was placed in the fort's stockade, where he attempted suicide by cutting himself with a razor. In a subsequent psychiatric session, he told a psychiatrist that he "had to" kill blacks. This admission caused Christopher's home to be searched by the police. There the police found evidence linking Christopher to three murders, which led to his indictment in April 1981 and his transfer back to Buffalo for his trial on May 8.

== Victims ==
#	Name	Age	Date	Location	Method	Result
1	Glenn Dunn	14	September 22, 1980	Buffalo, NY	Shot	Killed
2	Harold Green	32	September 23, 1980	Cheektowaga, NY	Shot	Killed
3	Emmanuel Thomas	30	September 23, 1980	Buffalo, NY	Shot	Killed
4	Joseph McCoy	43	September 24, 1980	Niagara Falls, NY	Shot	Killed
5	Parler Edwards	71	October 8, 1980	Amherst, NY	Bludgeoned	Killed
6	Ernest Jones	40	October 9, 1980	Tonawanda/Buffalo, NY	Bludgeoned	Killed
7	Collin Cole	37	October 10, 1980	Buffalo, NY	Strangled	Survived
8	John Adams	25	December 22, 1980 @ 11:30am	Manhattan, NY	Stabbed	Survived
9	Ivan Frazier	32	December 22, 1980 @ ~1:30pm	Manhattan, NY	Stabbed	Survived
10	Luis Rodriguez	19	December 22, 1980 @ 3:30pm	Manhattan, NY	Stabbed	Killed
11	Antone Davis	30	December 22, 1980 @ 6:50pm	Manhattan, NY	Stabbed	Killed
12	Richard Renner	20	December 22, 1980 @ ~10:50pm	Manhattan, NY	Stabbed	Killed
13	Carl Ramsey	?	December 22, 1980 @ ~11pm–12am	Manhattan, NY	Stabbed	Killed
14	Roger Adams	31	December 29, 1980	Buffalo, NY	Stabbed	Killed
15	Wendell Barnes	26	December 30, 1980	Rochester, NY	Stabbed	Killed
16	Albert Menefee	32	December 31, 1980	Buffalo, NY	Stabbed	Survived
17	Larry Little	?	January 1, 1981	Buffalo, NY	Stabbed	Survived
18	Calvin Crippen	23	January 1, 1981	Buffalo, NY	Stabbed	Survived
19	Leonard Coles	?	January 18, 1981	Fort Benning, GA	Slashed/stabbed	Survived

== Trial, imprisonment and death ==
He pleaded not guilty to the three murders and refused counsel by lawyers hired by his mother, opting instead to represent himself. He was subsequently found guilty and sentenced to 60 years in prison, but this ruling was overturned as the trial judge had barred the defense from presenting expert psychiatric testimony about Christopher's ability to stand trial. He was later found competent to stand trial, and appeared in court again in 1985 under various charges which led to him being sentenced to life imprisonment. While imprisoned at the Attica Correctional Facility, Christopher claimed that he committed 13 killings. Christopher would ultimately be convicted of three .22 caliber killings, those being Glenn Dunn, Harold Green and Emanuel Thomas. He died in prison due to a rare form of male breast cancer on March 1, 1993, at the age of 37.

== Media coverage ==
The Discovery Channel cable network television show The FBI Files first aired its Joseph Christopher investigation, on May 9, 2000, titled the ".22 Caliber Killer".

== See also ==
- Neal Long
- Payton Gendron - Another racially motivated murderer who attacked Buffalo.
- List of serial killers in the United States
- List of serial killers by number of victims
