= Chubbuck =

Chubbuck is a surname of German and English origin. Notable people with the surname include:

- Byron Chubbuck (born 1967), American bank robber
- Christine ”Chris” Chubbuck (1944–1974), American television reporter
- Emily Chubbuck (1817–1854), American poet
- Ivana Chubbuck, American acting coach
- Thomas Chubbuck (1820–1888), American engraver

== See also ==
- Chubbuck, Idaho
