= FBI Ten Most Wanted Fugitives, 1980s =

The FBI's Ten Most Wanted Fugitives during the 1980s is a list, maintained for a fourth decade, of the Ten Most Wanted Fugitives of the United States Federal Bureau of Investigation.

== FBI headlines in the 1980s ==
During the 1980s, the FBI added the names of the two longest-lasting profiles of the Top Ten Fugitives. The current longest member, Victor Manuel Gerena became the 386th fugitive to be placed on May 14, 1984, and is currently still at large. The FBI added, Donald Eugene Webb, on May 4, 1981, who remained on the list until March 2007 when the FBI, presuming his death, removed his name. Webb the second longest member of the list, remained on 25 years, 10 months and 27 days. The 1980s also brought the first man-and-woman couple listed together, who were FALN terrorist group associates Donna Jean Willmott and Claude Daniel Marks. The couple surrendered together seven years later, then pleaded guilty together to a Leavenworth prison breakout conspiracy from 1987.

Among other prominent fugitives in the decade were Mutulu Shakur, the stepfather of the later famed rapper Tupac Shakur. The boss of the Colombo crime family, Carmine Persico, also made the list in the 1980s.

The decade also was marked by the start of the popular Fox television program America's Most Wanted in 1988, which became a major new publicity venue for profiling and then the apprehension of many of the FBI's Top Ten Fugitives.

== FBI Ten Most Wanted Fugitives to begin the 1980s ==
The FBI in the past has identified individuals by the sequence number in which each individual has appeared on the list. Some individuals have even appeared twice, and often a sequence number was permanently assigned to an individual suspect who was soon caught, captured, or simply removed, before their appearance could be published on the publicly released list. In those cases, the public would see only gaps in the number sequence reported by the FBI. For convenient reference, the wanted suspect's sequence number and date of entry on the FBI list appear below, whenever possible.

As the new decade opened, the following Fugitives from prior years still remained at large, as the members of the FBI's Ten Most Wanted list:

Name	Sequence Number	Date of Entry	Notes
Charles Lee Herron	#265	1968	• Arrested in June 1986
Katherine Ann Power	#315	1970	• Surrendered to authorities in 1993
Joseph Maurice McDonald	#339	1976	• Arrested September 15, 1982
Raymond Luc Levasseur	#350	1977	• Arrested November 4, 1984
Carlos Alberto Torres	#356	1977	• Arrested April 4, 1980
Charles Everett Hughes	#364	1978	• Arrested April 29, 1981
Leo Joseph Koury	#366	1979	• Eluded the FBI for 12 years before dying of a stroke on June 16, 1991.
John William Sherman	#367	1979	• Arrested December 17, 1981
Earl Edwin Austin	#370	1979	• Arrested March 1, 1980
Vincent James Russo	#371	1979	• Arrested January 4, 1985

== FBI Ten Most Wanted Fugitives added during the 1980s ==
The most wanted fugitives listed in the decade of the 1980s includes (in FBI list appearance sequence order):

=== 1980 ===
Name	Sequence Number	Date of Entry	Time Listed
Albert Victory	#372	March 14, 1980	One year
Albert Victory was wanted by the FBI after he slipped away from two New York prison guards he had bribed to take him to his girlfriend's hotel room. He was in prison for killing New York City police officer John E. Varecha during a traffic stop. He was arrested at his home after being traced to Lafayette, California on February 24, 1981, by New York State Police.
Ronald Turney Williams	#373	April 16, 1980	One year
Ronald Turney Williams was wanted for escaping West Virginia State Penitentiary in a mass breakout on Nov. 7, 1979, where he was serving a life sentence for murder, armed robbery, kidnapping and arson. During the escape, they came across a passing vehicle and fatally shot the driver who was an off-duty West Virginia state trooper. He was arrested at a stakeout at George Washington Hotel in New York City on June 8, 1981. He was shot and wounded by an FBI agent.

=== 1981 ===
Name	Sequence Number	Date of Entry	Time Listed
Daniel Jay Barney	#374	March 10, 1981	One month
Daniel Jay Barney was wanted for escaping jail. The FBI stated the he and his brother had the MO of breaking into woman's homes and taking turns sexually assaulting them. He died from a self-inflicted gunshot following a hostage crisis on April 19, 1981, where he had taken four hostages in a condo in Denver, Colorado. After two escaped and the police negotiated the release of the other two hostages, Barney killed himself.
Donald Eugene Webb	#375	May 4, 1981	Removed from the list
Donald Eugene Webb was wanted in connection with the December 4, 1980, murder of the police chief in Saxonburg, Pennsylvania, who was shot twice at close range after being brutally beaten in the head and face with a blunt instrument. After eluding capture for over two decades, he was removed from the list on March 31, 2007, without ever being located. On July 14, 2017, remains found at the Dartmouth home of Webb's wife were identified as belonging to Webb. Investigators stated that Webb had died in 1999.
Gilbert James Everett	#376	May 13, 1981	Four years
Gilbert James Everett was wanted for a spree of 86 bank robberies in the 1980s and was arrested by local police in Bismarck, Arkansas on August 12, 1985.
Leslie Nichols	#377	July 2, 1981	Five months
Leslie Nichols was wanted for killing four people in Little Rock, Arkansas, between June 12 and 15, 1980, in drug-related shootings. The victims hands and feet were tied with coat hanger wire and shot in the head execution style. He was arrested in his apartment in Los Angeles, California on December 17, 1981, by FBI agents and local police.

=== 1982 ===
Name	Sequence Number	Date of Entry	Time Listed
Thomas William Manning	#378	January 29, 1982	Three years
Thomas William Manning was a part of a Marxist organization, the United Freedom Front (UFF), which bombed a series of US military and commercial institutes. Funded by bank robberies in the 1970s and early 1980s. He was arrested in Norfolk, Virginia on April 24, 1985.
David Fountain Kimberly Jr.	#379	January 29, 1982	Six months
David Fountain Kimberly Jr. shot and wounded a federal police officer in October 1981. He was arrested without incident in Matecumbe Key, Florida on July 8, 1982, by FBI agents; despite being armed with a loaded .38 caliber tucked in his waistband.
Mutulu Shakur	#380	July 23, 1982	Four years
Mutulu Shakur was arrested February 11, 1986, in Los Angeles, California, on Racketeer Influenced and Corrupt Organizations Act charges for bank robbery to finance a militant organization, and for having aided Assata Shakur (unrelated), in her escape from prison in New Jersey, where she had been incarcerated for the murder and wounding of one state trooper and another Black Panther member accompanying her in 1973 while stopped on the New Jersey Turnpike.
Charles Edward Watson	#381	October 22, 1982	One year
Charles Edward Watson was wanted for escaping prison while serving time as an accessory to the murder of a state trooper with a shotgun. After the murder he and another fled the scene, kidnapped a woman and raped her. He was arrested in Slatington, Pennsylvania on October 25, 1983, while leaving his residence.

=== 1983 ===
Name	Sequence Number	Date of Entry	Time Listed
Laney Gibson Jr.	#382	November 28, 1983	Three weeks
Laney Gibson Jr. was wanted for escaping the Clay County jail with other prisoners while awaiting trial for the murder of R. T. Gray. He was arrested in Montgomery, Alabama on December 18, 1983, at a suburban motel.

=== 1984 ===
Name	Sequence Number	Date of Entry	Time Listed
George Clarence Bridgette	#383	January 10, 1984	Three weeks
George Clarence Bridgette was wanted for the murder of four people, including a 3-year-old child in a drug related shooting, where he and two other accomplices walked into a Long Beach, California, house and shot five people. He was arrested in Miami, Florida on January 30, 1984, after a civilian recognized his photo from an Identification Order in a post office.
Samuel Marks Humphrey	#384	February 29, 1984	One month
Samuel Marks Humphrey was wanted in connection to a murder of a man in his home and two bank robberies. He was arrested in Portland, Oregon on March 22, 1984.
Christopher Bernard Wilder	#385	April 5, 1984	One week
Christopher Bernard Wilder was wanted for the murders of several young women in several different states. He was killed in a shootout with police at a gas station in Colebrook, New Hampshire, on April 13, 1984.
Victor Manuel Gerena	#386	May 14, 1984	Still at large but removed from the list
Victor Manuel Gerena is wanted in connection with the 1983 armed robbery of approximately $7 million from a security company in Connecticut. He allegedly took two security employees hostage at gunpoint and then handcuffed, bound and injected them with an unknown substance in order to further disable them. He was removed from the list on December 15, 2016. He was on the list for 32 years, seven months and one day - the longest anyone has been on the list.
Wai-Chiu Ng	#387	June 15, 1984	Four months
Wai-Chiu Ng was wanted in the February 19, 1983 Wah Mee massacre, the worst mass killing in the history of Seattle, Washington, during which thirteen people were shot to death at the Wah Mee Club, a gambling club in Seattle's International District. He was acquitted in April 1985 of murder, but convicted of 13 counts of first-degree robbery, and sentenced to seven consecutive life terms. He was arrested in Calgary, Alberta, Canada on October 4, 1984, by the Royal Canadian Mounted Police. He became the third suspect, charged in absentia on March 30, 1983, with 13 counts of aggravated first-degree murder.
Alton Coleman	#388	July 17, 1984	Three days
Alton Coleman was wanted for the murder of 44-year-old Marlene Walters of Norwood, Ohio, among others, during a six-state killing spree in 1984. He was arrested in Evanston, Illinois on July 20, 1984, by local police due to civilian cooperation. He was executed by the state of Ohio on April 26, 2002.
Cleveland McKinley Davis	#389	October 24, 1984	Three months
Cleveland McKinley Davis, a.k.a. Jomo Joka Omowale after joining the Black Panthers, was wanted for the attempted robbery and murder of a drug dealer with two other accomplices in Virginia Beach. He was arrested in New York City on January 25, 1985, by FBI agents and local police.

=== 1985 ===
Name	Sequence Number	Date of Entry	Time Listed
Carmine Persico	#390	January 31, 1985	Two weeks
Carmine Persico a.k.a. "Junior" was serving a 100-year sentence after being convicted of murder and labor and construction racketeering in 1986. He was arrested in Wantagh, New York on February 15, 1985, by FBI agents. Persico was boss of the New York-based Colombo crime family.
Lohman Ray Mays Jr.	#391	February 15, 1985	Seven months
Lohman Ray Mays Jr., a career criminal, was wanted for escaping Turney Center Industrial Prison and then robbing several banks before he was arrested in Cheyenne, Wyoming on September 23, 1985, by local police.
Charles Earl Hammond	#392	March 14, 1985	One year
Charles Earl Hammond was wanted in connection to drug-related murders in Kansas City in May, 1980 along with his brother Michael Frederick Allan Hammond (#393). He was apprehended on August 4, 1986.
Michael Frederic Allen Hammond	#393	March 14, 1985	One year
Michael Frederic Allen Hammond was wanted in connection to drug-related murders in Kansas City in May, 1980 along with his brother Charles Earl Hammond (#392).
Robert Henry Nicolaus	#394	June 28, 1985	One month
Robert Henry Nicolaus was wanted for shooting his ex-wife twice in the chest while on parole for killing his three children. She was able to identify Nicolaus as her assailant before dying. He was arrested in York, Pennsylvania on July 20, 1985, after a civilian recognized his photo on an Identification Order at a post office.
David Jay Sterling	#395	September 30, 1985	Five months
David Jay Sterling was arrested and convicted for a series of rapes in 1983 in which after he was sentenced, sent to a sexual psychopath treatment program at Western State Hospital. However, he escaped in 1985 and robbed six banks with an accomplice in at least three different states, using stolen airplanes to escape. He was arrested after being pulled over in a routine traffic stop near Covington, Louisiana on February 13, 1986, by local police.
Richard Joseph Scutari	#396	September 30, 1985	Six months
Richard Joseph Scutari was wanted for racketeering, harboring a fugitive, and storing about $40,000 from a $3.6-million robbery of a Brink's armored truck in July, 1984. He was identified by the FBI as a member of The Order, a white supremacist group believed connected with the murder of Alan Berg. Berg was a Jewish radio talk show host for KOA (AM), a Denver-based station. He was arrested without incident at a repair shop he worked at, in San Antonio, Texas on March 19, 1986. He is currently serving a 60-year sentence.
Joseph William Dougherty	#397	November 6, 1985	One year
Joseph William Dougherty along with another fellow inmate, Terry Lee Conner (#402), were wanted for escaping custody when being transported from the federal prison at El Reno, to the courthouse in downtown Oklahoma City, Dougherty brought out a sharp object and held it to the throat of a U.S. Marshal. The two Marshals transporting them were left handcuffed to a tree as the two fled in Marshal's car. During an 18-month hunt for Conner and Dougherty, they were identified as suspects in a series of bank robberies. He was arrested by FBI agents in Antioch, California on December 19, 1986, outside a local laundromat.

=== 1986 ===
Name	Sequence Number	Date of Entry	Time Listed
Brian Patrick Malverty	#398	March 28, 1986	One week
Brian Patrick Malverty was wanted in connection of the murder of Gene West and 17-year-old Ricky Lee Sims. They were both robbed, bound and gagged, shot in the head, chest, and back; then their bodies and house were set on fire. He was arrested in San Diego, California on April 7, 1986, after a civilian recognized his photo on an Identification Order at a post office.
Billy Ray Waldon	#399	May 16, 1986	One month
Billy Ray Waldon was wanted for several robberies and murders, two burglaries, a rape, and arson. He was arrested in San Diego, California on June 16, 1986, after local police attempted to pull him over for a routine traffic citation. Initially sentenced to death for his crimes, Waldon's conviction was overturned in 2023.
Claude Lafayette Dallas Jr.	#400	May 16, 1986	One year
Claude Lafayette Dallas Jr. was wanted for the deaths of two game wardens in Idaho. He was arrested in Riverside, California on March 8, 1987, by FBI agents while he was leaving a convenience store.
Donald Keith Williams	#401	July 18, 1986	One month
Donald Keith Williams, a.k.a. the "Veil Bandit" because he wore a cloth veil over a baseball cap to disguise himself, committed 34 bank robberies and was wanted for stealing more than $100,000 over the course of three years. He was arrested in Los Angeles, California on August 20, 1986, by FBI agents through assistance of a concerned civilian.
Terry Lee Conner	#402	August 8, 1986	Four months
Terry Lee Conner was wanted for escaping custody of the U.S. Marshal's alongside Joseph William Dougherty (#397) while being transported from the federal prison at El Reno to the courthouse in downtown Oklahoma City. In one of the robberies they both stole $500,000 from the Central Bank of West Allis by holding the vice president of the bank, his wife, his daughter, and his daughter's boyfriend hostage for three days. He was arrested without incident in Arlington Heights, Illinois on December 9, 1986, by the U.S. Marshals Service and the FBI.
Fillmore Raymond Cross Jr.	#403	August 8, 1986	Four months
Fillmore Raymond Cross Jr. was wanted for supposedly beating a businessman in an extortion scheme. Cross, a former president of the Hells Angels motorcycle group in San Jose, California, surrendered voluntarily to the FBI in San Francisco, California on December 23, 1986.
James Wesley Dyess	#404	September 29, 1986	Two years
James Wesley Dyess was wanted for escaping federal custody while being charged with two murders committed during a home burglary in Jackson, Mississippi. He was arrested in Los Angeles, California March 16, 1988, when he was stopped on a routine traffic violation and recognized by a Los Angeles Police Department officer.
Danny Michael Weeks	#405	September 29, 1986	Two years
Danny Michael Weeks was wanted for escaping from a prison in Angola, where he was incarcerated for murder and armed robbery. Two weeks before his capture, he kidnapped Susan K. Vincent at gunpoint from a shopping center in Greensboro, North Carolina. Vincent was released three days later unharmed. He was arrested at his son's home in Seattle, Washington on March 20, 1988, due to an FBI task force and civilian cooperation. He had been featured on America's Most Wanted.
Mike Wayne Jackson	#406	October 1, 1986	One day
Mike Wayne Jackson was wanted for killing his probation officer in Indianapolis on September 22, 1986, before fleeing to Missouri. He committed suicide by shotgun in Wright City, Missouri on October 2, 1986.
Thomas George Harrelson	#407	November 28, 1986	Three months
Thomas George Harrelson, a member of the Aryan Nations Church, was accused of taking $50,000 from a Rossville, Illinois bank and shooting at a police car during a car chase. He was arrested in Drayton, North Dakota on February 9, 1987, after his getaway car slid into a ditch while trying to flee the scene of a bank robbery.

=== 1987 ===
Name	Sequence Number	Date of Entry	Time Listed
Robert Allen Litchfield	#408	January 20, 1987	Four months
Robert Allen Litchfield a.k.a. the “Block House Bandit”, was wanted for escaping from federal prison in Talladega, Alabama while serving a 60-year sentence for 15 bank robberies. He was arrested at Lake Tahoe in Zephyr Cove, Nevada on May 20, 1987, by FBI agents in close cooperation with the U.S. Marshal Service and the Sheriff's office.
David James Roberts	#409	April 27, 1987	Ten months
David James Roberts was arrested February 11, 1988, in Staten Island, New York, in an apartment after hiding for four days, due to FBI investigation and civilian information. He was convicted for murder, kidnapping, arson and rape, and was given six life sentences in an Indiana State Prison. However, after his daring escape from a prison vehicle while on the way to the state prison, he worked as the director of a homeless shelter in Staten Island, New York, under his alias Bob Lord. He had seen himself on the first episode of a reality TV show from FOX called America's Most Wanted (AMW) on February 7, 1988. He was not only the first fugitive to be profiled in such show, but also the first direct capture as a result of the program and the first from the FBI's Ten Most Wanted Fugitives list. He is currently serving several consecutive life sentences at Pendleton Correctional Facility in Indiana.
Ronald Glyn Triplett	#410	April 27, 1987	Three weeks
Ronald Glyn Triplett was wanted for escaping prison where he was being held for robbery and attempted murder of a waitress. He later held two federal agents at gunpoint. He was arrested in Tempe, Arizona on May 16, 1987.
Claude Daniel Marks	#411	May 22, 1987	Seven years
Claude Daniel Marks pleaded guilty on May 9, 1995, to a prison escape conspiracy in Illinois. He surrendered December 6, 1994, along with his partner Donna Jean Willmott (#412). He and Willmott had purchased 36 pounds of explosive from undercover FBI in 1985 to attempt to free a FALN leader from Leavenworth prison before going on the run.
Donna Jean Willmott	#412	May 22, 1987	Seven years
Donna Jean Willmott pleaded guilty on May 9, 1995, to a prison escape conspiracy in Illinois. She surrendered on December 6, 1994, along with her partner Claude Daniel Marks (#411). She and Marks had purchased 36 pounds of explosive from an undercover FBI agent in 1985 to attempt to free a FALN leader from Leavenworth prison.
Darren Dee O'Neall	#413	June 25, 1987	Four months
Darren Dee O'Neall was wanted for the rape and murder of multiple women. He was arrested on an auto-theft charge in Lakeland, Florida October 25, 1987. Louisiana State Police later discovered his "Top Ten" identity.
Louis Ray Beam Jr.	#414	July 14, 1987	Four months
Louis Ray Beam Jr. is a white supremacist with ties to the Ku Klux Klan who was wanted on charges of seditious conspiracy to violently overthrow the U.S. government, including alleged participation in a conspiracy to assassinate a federal judge and an FBI agent in Arkansas with 14 others. He was arrested at home with his wife in Guadalajara, Mexico on November 6, 1987. During the arrest, Beam's wife opened fire and critically injured a Mexican police officer. He was later acquitted of the conspiracy charges.

=== 1988 ===
Name	Sequence Number	Date of Entry	Time Listed
Ted Jeffery Otsuki	#415	January 22, 1988	Eight months
Ted Jeffery Otsuki was wanted for the murder of a Boston, Massachusetts police officer and shooting of another police officer he believed were chasing him. He had been featured on America's Most Wanted in 1987 for his crimes. He was arrested in Guadalajara, Mexico on September 4, 1988, by Mexican Federal Judicial Police and the FBI who had set up a surveillance team and waited for him at his apartment.
Pedro Luis Estrada	#416	April 15, 1988	One year
Pedro Luis Estrada was wanted for three homicides and possible involvement in two others as a henchman for a New York-based narcotics ring. He was arrested by a SWAT team of FBI agents at his home in Harrisburg, Pennsylvania on October 1, 1989. He had been featured on America's Most Wanted which received information leading to his arrest.
John Edward Stevens	#417	May 29, 1988	Six months
John Edward Stevens was wanted for his involvement in 25 robberies in eight states. He was featured on America's Most Wanted for his crimes. He was arrested in Cincinnati, Ohio on November 30, 1988.
Jack Darrell Farmer	#418	May 29, 1988	Three days
Jack Darrell Farmer, while awaiting trial on racketeering charges which included two murders, drug trafficking and extortion, was released to his attorney's custody on day visits to prepare for the trial. On one visit, he tied and gagged his lawyer and escaped. He was arrested in Lantana, Florida on June 1, 1988, after being featured on America's Most Wanted. He was recognized by a co-worker who called in. He was the leader of Chicago's "Little Mafia" gang.
Roger Lee Jones	#419	May 29, 1988	One year
Roger Lee Jones was the first child molester to be added to the list when he fled Sarasota, Florida after being charged with seven counts of lewd and lascivious assault on a child under 16. He was arrested in Great Falls, Montana on March 4, 1989, at KOA campground, after being featured on America's Most Wanted.
Terry Lee Johnson	#420	June 12, 1988	Two months
Terry Lee Johnson was wanted for escaping from Limestone prison in Athens, Alabama, in 1986 while serving a life sentence for murder. He was arrested in San Diego, California on August 17, 1988, by the San Diego Police Department. Johnson was sleeping in his pick-up truck when local police, upon noticing his truck had expired tags, arrested him on an unrelated traffic warrant under the name Lee Johnson. After spending several days in San Diego County Jail, Johnson, just before being released, was recognized by FBI agents at the County Jail who were picking up another prisoner. He was recognized from a recent episode of "Americas Most Wanted" and was subsequently arrested again.
Stanley Faison	#421	November 27, 1988	One month
Stanley Faison was wanted for beating Ophilena Edwards with a tire iron, then fatally stabbing her boyfriend, Sylvester Wilson. He was arrested in Detroit, Michigan on December 24, 1988, by FBI and local police. He had been featured on America's Most Wanted.
Steven Ray Stout	#422	November 27, 1988	One week
Steven Ray Stout had strangled and stabbed to death his former mother-in-law, Bonnie Craft, and one of her daughters, Maureen Turner. He entered Craft's mobile home, beat 19-year-old Turner with a hammer, strangled and then stabbed her two times in the chest. He then waited for Craft to return home, then beat and stabbed her to death before putting both bodies in the bedroom. He was arrested in Gulfport, Mississippi on December 6, 1988, after being featured on America's Most Wanted.

=== 1989 ===
Name	Sequence Number	Date of Entry	Time Listed
Armando Garcia	#423	January 8, 1989	Five years
Armando Garcia and 14 other Miami police officers participated in a drug ripoff ring in the mid-1980s later dubbed the Miami River Cops Scandal. Uniformed officers, all on the graveyard shift, would raid drug dealers, steal their cocaine and later resell it. Garcia met with some other defendants and plotted to kill some of the witnesses, then vanished in 1987 with his father and wife. He was arrested in Cali, Colombia on January 18, 1994, with his father, after being featured on America's Most Wanted.
Melvin Edward Mays	#424	February 7, 1989	Six years
Melvin Edward Mays was wanted on 40 counts of conspiracy to commit acts of terror on behalf of the Libyan Government as a top general of the El Rukin street gang. He was arrested by the FBI's Chicago Joint Terrorism Task Force on March 9, 1995. Mays evaded arrest in 1986 while awaiting trial and was featured on America's Most Wanted as well as Unsolved Mysteries.
Bobby G. Dennie	#425	February 24, 1989	Eight months
Bobby G. Dennie was wanted in Florida and four other states on various charges, including murder, rape, robbery, forgery, theft and escape. He was arrested in Lake Wales, Florida on October 28, 1989, by the FBI and Polk County detectives after receiving information following his feature on Unsolved Mysteries. He had also been featured on America's Most Wanted.
Costabile "Gus" Farace	#426	February 24, 1989	Nine months
Costabile "Gus" Farace was wanted for the murder of DEA agent Everette Hatcher during a drug sting operation on the Bonanno crime family in Staten Island, New York. Farace was later murdered by James Galione and Mario Gallo who pleaded guilty in 1997. Prosecutors said the men worked at the time for the Bonanno family, which had put out a hit on Farace over Hatcher's killing. He had been featured on America's Most Wanted.
Arthur Lee Washington Jr.	#427	October 18, 1989	Still at large but removed from the list
Arthur Lee Washington Jr. is wanted in the attempted murder of a New Jersey state trooper using a .45 caliber semi-automatic handgun on April 12, 1989. Washington had been associated in the past with militant black prison groups and the Black Liberation Army. There was evidence that he may have been an injection drug user, due to the old track marks on both arms. He was removed from the list in December 2000 for no longer meeting the list criteria. He is still wanted by New Jersey State Police.
Lee Nell Carter	#428	November 19, 1989	One day
Lee Nell Carter was wanted for a shooting spree that left a woman dead and two men injured due to an affair. He was arrested in Detroit on November 20, 1989, by FBI agents and Detroit police. Civilians identified him during the broadcast of America's Most Wanted.
Wardell David Ford	#429	December 20, 1989	Nine months
Wardell David Ford was wanted for an armored car robbery on February 22, 1983, in which he killed one of the guards. Ford's cousin, David Temple, an accomplice in the robbery, died in the shootout. He was arrested in New Haven, Connecticut on September 17, 1990, after being featured on America's Most Wanted. He had also been featured on Unsolved Mysteries.

== End of the decade ==
As the decade closed, the following were still at large as the Ten Most Wanted Fugitives:

Name	Sequence number	Date of entry
Leo Joseph Koury	#366	1979
Donald Eugene Webb	#375	1981
Victor Manuel Gerena	#386	1984
Claude Daniel Marks	#411	1987
Donna Jean Willmott	#412	1987
Armando Garcia	#423	1989
Melvin Edward Mays	#424	1989
Arthur Lee Washington Jr.	#427	1989
Wardell David Ford	#429	1989

One spot on the list of Ten remained unfilled from a capture late in the year 1989. It was filled the next month in 1990.

== FBI directors in the 1980s ==
- William H. Webster (1978–1987)
- John E. Otto (1987)
- William S. Sessions (1987–1993)
