= Miami River Cops Scandal =

Police corruption case

The Miami River Cops Scandal was a major police corruption case that occurred in Miami, Florida, during the mid-1980s. It is considered one of the most significant instances of police corruption in United States history. The scandal came to public attention on July 28, 1985, when three bodies were discovered floating in the Miami River. What initially appeared to be a botched police raid was revealed to be a drug ripoff gone wrong, perpetrated by corrupt police officers of the Miami Police Department.

== Background ==
The River Cops were a group of 19 police officers convicted of various state and federal crimes including murder, racketeering, robbery, drug possession, civil rights violations and conspiracy charges.

Beginning in 1984, a group of officers, later dubbed "The Enterprise", started to steal cash and drugs from motorists stopped for traffic violations to later sell for a profit. They then started to go after bigger operations by getting tip-offs from informants. On July 13, 1985, the officers seized hundreds of kilograms of cocaine in secret compartments of the Mitzi Ann, a boat docked at the Tamiami Marina.

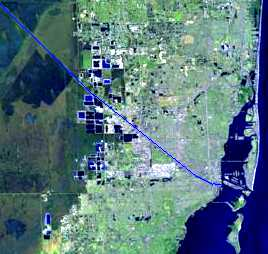
Map of the Miami River

In July 1985, ten people dressed as officers forced their way into the Jones Boat Yard along the Miami River, from which the name "River Cops" derives. They raided a shipment of drugs on a pleasure boat named the Mary C, taking 350–400 kilograms (770–880 lb) of cocaine worth around $10 million at the time (equivalent to $30,000,000 in 2025). During the raid, three of the seven person crew unloading the cocaine drowned attempting to escape. It was believed to be a raid gone bad until a night watchman revealed that they were actual police officers who raided the boat yard. One witness even testified that they had their weapons drawn and were yelling, "Kill them! Kill them!" as they approached.

Some of the seized cocaine was kept for personal use but most was sold. The corruption was uncovered during the investigation into the deaths at the Jones Boat Yard and when officers were apprehended attempting to sell the cocaine to undercover agents as well as a covert recording sting operation at the helm of Metro-Dade detective Alex Alvarez. The first trial of the River Cops started in September 1986 with Armando Estrada, Rodolfo Arias, Roman Rodriguez, Armando Garcia, Arturo de la Vega, Osvaldo Coello and Ricardo Aleman as defendants, but resulted in a mistrial after jurors could not agree on a verdict. Twenty officers, including the original seven from the first trial, were indicted as part of a new trial. After Arias became a prosecution witness, ten officers pleaded guilty and two were convicted at trial in February 1988. In the end, nearly 100 officers had been arrested, fired, suspended, or reprimanded. City officials cited community growth lead to lax hiring standards as well as terrible supervision of officers.

== Notable officers ==
=== Armando "Scarface" Garcia ===
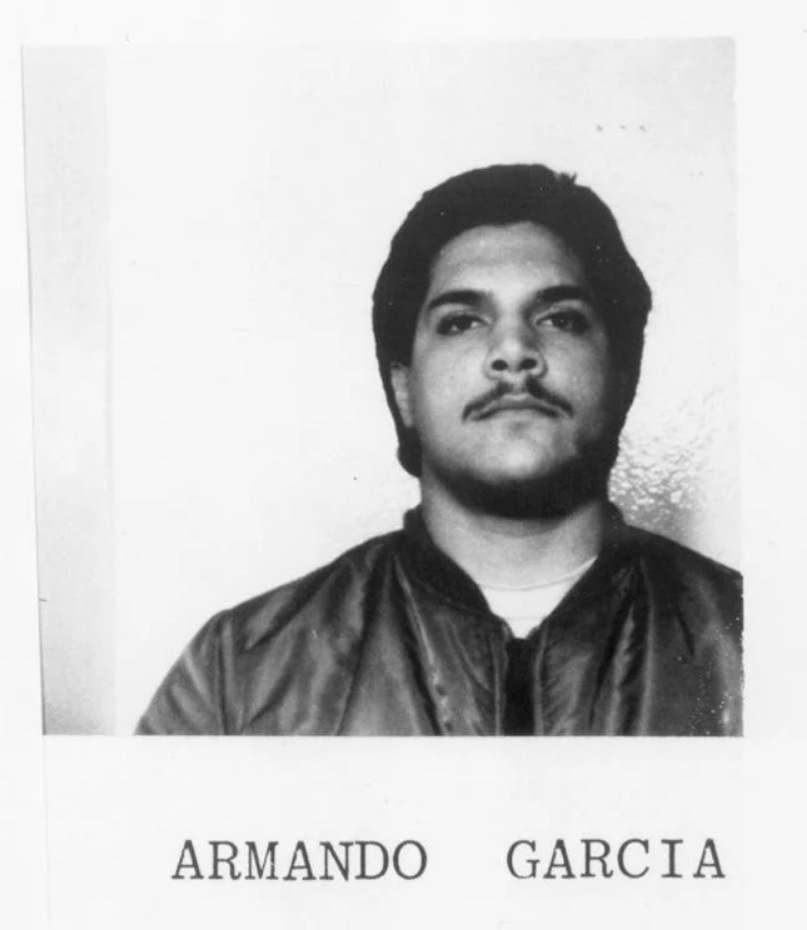
FBI Most Wanted Poster from 1994

A leading member of "The Enterprise", Garcia met with some other defendants and plotted to kill some of the witnesses, then vanished in 1987 with his father and wife. He was added to the FBI Ten Most Wanted List on January 18, 1994, as fugitive #423. A tip from the America’s Most Wanted led authorities to Garcia where Colombian security police stopped him as he drove away from his apartment in Cali, Colombia. He was arrested alongside his father. After failing to try and bribe an officer, he was extradited to the United States. According to prison records, Garcia was in prison until 2006.

=== Rodolfo "Rudy" Arias ===
Arias did not participate in the Jones Boat Yard incident but was gifted 4 kilos by other officers involved. He then turned and sold it for $92,000. He says he has made at least $1.08 million from reselling stolen drugs from smugglers. He later turned states evidence and became a star witness for the prosecution. he was also charged with conspiracy to commit murder after conspiring with Coello to murder a local bar owner who helped local cops get started in the drug trade.

=== Osvaldo Coello ===
Though his first trial was left in a hung jury, while out on bond, he fled to Jamaica and later the Bahamas. After being captured he stood trial. Coello was convicted of six charges, but was acquitted on three civil rights charges involving the drownings of three drug smugglers of the Jones Boat Yard Incident. Although Coello was sentenced to 35 years in prison, he served about two-thirds of that time because of good behavior. He was also charged with conspiracy to commit murder alongside Arias.

=== Ricardo Aleman ===
Aleman was the first officer convicted for their role in "The Enterprise" on charges of conspiracy and possession of cocaine and two counts of income tax evasion. He admitted to making over $1 million by reselling stolen cocaine and planned the killing of witnesses.
