= Donald Eugene Webb =

American criminal (1931–1999)

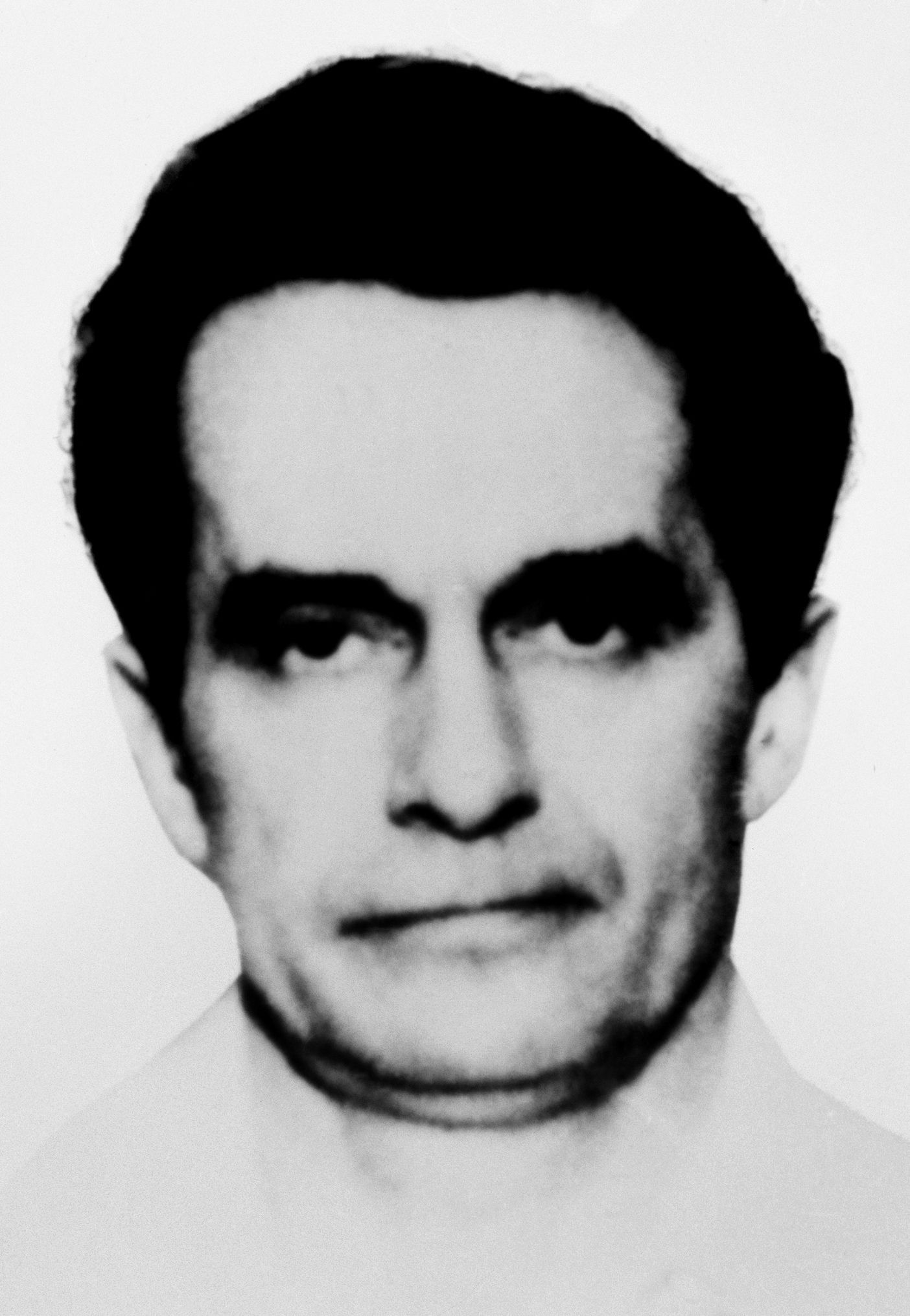
- Photograph taken in 1979

FBI Ten Most Wanted Fugitive
- Charges: Unlawful flight to avoid prosecution; Murder; Attempted burglary
- Alias: A. D. Webb, Donald Eugene Perkins, Donald Eugene Pierce, John S. Portas, Stanley John Portas, Bev Webb, Eugene Bevlin Webb, Eugene Donald Webb, Stanley Webb

Description
- Born: Donald Eugene Perkins; July 14, 1931; Oklahoma City, Oklahoma, U.S.
- Died: December 30, 1999 (aged 68); Dartmouth, Massachusetts, U.S.
- Nationality: American
- Occupation: Butcher; Salesman; Restaurant manager; Vending machine repairman
- Spouse: Lillian Webb

Status
- Added: May 4, 1981
- Number: 375
- Deceased prior to capture

Donald Eugene Webb (born Donald Eugene Perkins; July 14, 1931 – December 30, 1999) was an American career criminal wanted for attempted burglary and the murder of police chief Gregory Adams in the small town of Saxonburg, Pennsylvania on December 4, 1980. It was only the second murder in the town's nearly 150-year history; the first murder occurred in 1842.

Webb was a fugitive featured on the FBI Ten Most Wanted Fugitives list until 2007, setting a record in 1999 for longest stay on the list, but was never apprehended. In 2010, his record on that list was superseded by another criminal; Víctor Manuel Gerena. The murder of Police Chief Adams was never solved by prosecution of the criminal; it was the longest-running cold case of a police officer in the United States. In July 2017, Webb's remains were discovered in Massachusetts on the property of his wife Lillian Webb. She had hidden him in two of her homes for 17 years, until he died of a stroke in 1999.

== Background and family ==
Donald Eugene Perkins was born in Oklahoma City in 1931. He was raised by his paternal grandfather. Perkins enlisted in the United States Navy, but received a dishonorable discharge.

Perkins legally changed his name to Webb in 1956 in Bristol County, Massachusetts.

Webb worked as a butcher, salesman, restaurant manager, and vending machine repairman. Before 1979, Webb spent extended periods in the Southwest, New England, and on the West Coast. After Webb's disappearance in 1980, his relatives and criminal associates consistently refused to cooperate with investigators.

Webb had married Lillian and they had a son together. In 1981, Webb's wife Lillian lived in South Dartmouth, Massachusetts. She worked as a saleswoman for a now-defunct New Bedford box company. In 1999, it was reported that Lillian, her son, and other relatives of Donald Webb were living in the Boston area.

== Criminal career ==
Webb had convictions for burglary, possession of counterfeit money, possession of a weapon and dangerous instruments, breaking and entering, armed bank robbery, grand larceny and car theft. In the mid-1970s, Webb served a two-year prison term in New York state prison.

The FBI has considered Webb "a master of assumed identities". New York and Pennsylvania police have described Webb as "an itinerant burglar well versed in the art of criminal impersonation". Webb was identified by the FBI as an associate of the Patriarca crime family, who made a living robbing banks, jewelry stores, and high-end hotels up and down the East Coast. They fenced the goods through "the mob" in Providence, Rhode Island. He was also involved with an organized crime outfit in the Miami area, where he would also fence the goods.

In 1979, Webb and two accomplices allegedly burgled suburban Albany homes while posing as sewer and water inspectors. Webb and Frank Joseph Lach, one of the accomplices, were arrested in Colonie, New York. They were charged with attempted burglary, but after their bails were posted (bail of Webb was $35,000), they failed to appear at a December 1979 court date.

=== Frank Lach ===
Frank Joseph Lach (November 23, 1940 – November 4, 2017), was closely associated with Webb. Lach is from Cranston, Rhode Island and was believed to be involved with a Massachusetts-based gang responsible for a number of jewel thefts from residences and businesses in the 1960s and 1970s, as well as having ties to organized crime in New England and South Florida.

Although the last known connection of Webb and Lach was in Allentown, Pennsylvania in July 1980, Lach was believed to be with Webb when he killed Police Chief Gregory Adams in December 1980 in Saxonburg. (See below)

Lach was subsequently wanted by the FBI for interstate flight from justice; he was captured in South Miami, Florida in May 1982. He was extradited to New York, where he was convicted of burglary and bail-jumping. He was paroled in November 1985. In February 1986, he was convicted by a federal jury of conspiracy to transport stolen property interstate, and of driving under the influence and parole violation in June 1996. Lach served time in federal prison and was released in October 2000. Lach died on November 4, 2017, at his house in Cranston, Rhode Island, at age 76.

== Murder of Gregory Adams ==
Gregory Adams

On December 4, 1980, Gregory B. Adams, a 31-year-old police chief of Saxonburg, Pennsylvania, and nine-year veteran of law enforcement, made a routine traffic stop in the parking lot of Agway Feed Store on Butler Street. Adams used his patrol car to stop the suspect by blocking the exit of the parking lot. When he asked the suspect for his driver's license, the suspect gave fraudulent identity documents then shot Adams. Officer Adams returned fire, but the shots were not fatal.

The man believed to be Donald Eugene Webb got out of the car and fought with Adams, disarming him and pistol-whipping him with his own revolver. Witnesses heard fired shots; four "pop" noises, presumably from a semiautomatic .25-caliber Colt pistol, and a "boom" from Adams' revolver. He was shot once in the arm and once in the chest at close range. By another account, Adams was shot twice in the chest, one bullet collapsing a lung and another tearing through the bottom of his heart. Adams was not wearing his bulletproof vest at the time. The killer took Adams' gun, ran to his patrol car, ripped out its microphone and took the keys before driving away in his own car.

A nearby resident found the mortally wounded Adams, who told her that he did not know his attacker and that he knew he was not going to make it. In addition to being shot, Adams was so badly beaten he was almost unrecognizable. Adams lost consciousness on the way to the hospital and died of his injuries. He was survived by his wife Mary Ann Adams and their two sons, Benjamin and Gregory, Jr. Adams is buried in St. Mary's Cemetery in Herman, Pennsylvania.

== Investigation ==
A .30-caliber Colt pistol, O-type blood (Webb's blood type), and a New Jersey driver's license bearing the name Stanley John Portas, an alias of Webb and the name of his wife Lillian's late prior husband, were among the evidence found at the murder scene. Portas had died in 1948. Webb is believed to have been in Saxonburg for a planned burglary of a jewelry store. Adams' revolver was later found approximately 7 miles (11 km) away along Cornplanter Road in Winfield Township, Pennsylvania. All six bullets of the weapon had been fired.

A white Mercury Cougar, which Webb had rented, was allegedly used as a getaway car. Two weeks later, it was found abandoned at a Howard Johnson's motel in Warwick, Rhode Island. Significant amounts of O-type blood were found under the steering wheel, suggesting that Webb was wounded by gunfire in the struggle with Adams.

Webb was named as a main suspect in the killing of Adams, and a nationwide manhunt began. He was charged in absentia with murder, attempted burglary, and unlawful flight to avoid prosecution. A federal arrest warrant was issued for him on December 31. On May 4, 1981, Webb was named as the 375th fugitive to be placed on the FBI's Ten Most Wanted list.

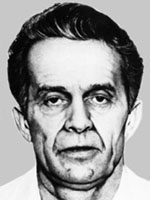
Age-enhanced photograph released by FBI in 1996.

Webb had strong ties to Fall River and New Bedford, Massachusetts, where the last confirmed sighting of him was made by an anonymous tipster in July 1981. It was reported to the Boston FBI office, but Webb had fled by the time investigators arrived. There were later unconfirmed sightings of Webb, or men resembling him, in Massachusetts, Washington, Canada and Costa Rica.

In January 1990, FBI director William S. Sessions received a letter postmarked January 23 and written by someone claiming to be Webb, asking for forgiveness from Adams' family. The letter suggested he might surrender to authorities, but only if he could talk directly to John Walsh, host of the TV show America's Most Wanted. Walsh said on his show that the FBI's evidence technicians examined the letter and believed it was authentic. Handwriting tests were inconclusive. On April 1, 1990, a man claiming to be Webb called John Walsh but when asked questions to confirm his identity, was unable to name two of Webb's closest relatives. The call was dismissed as an April Fools' joke. The murder case was featured in an episode of Unsolved Mysteries.

After more than 18 years on the list, on September 14, 1999, Webb was noted as the fugitive with the longest tenure on the FBI Ten Most Wanted list, surpassing the previous record held by Charles Lee Herron.

In April 2005, an unidentified man in Detroit was found using Webb's name, age and Social Security number. Detroit police tracked the address to a burned-out house in a poor section of town. Authorities considered this a case of identity theft, however unusual.

The FBI removed Webb from the Ten Most Wanted list on March 31, 2007. He was replaced by Shauntay Henderson. Webb held the record of being on the FBI's wanted list longer than any other fugitive until 2010, when Víctor Manuel Gerena surpassed his record. Although Webb was still a fugitive considered armed and dangerous by the FBI, the significant lack of leads made some investigators believe Webb had died.

On December 4, 2015, the FBI increased their reward to $100,000 for information leading to the arrest of Webb, or to the location of his remains. Key investigators, including the FBI special agent assigned to finding Webb, believed he was still alive.

On June 1, 2017, Mary Ann Adams Jones, the police chief's widow (who had remarried), filed a lawsuit for civil damages against Donald Eugene Webb, his wife Lillian Webb, and Webb's stepson Stanley Webb. FBI investigators had announced that in 2016 they had discovered a secret room hidden behind a closet in the basement of Lillian Webb's home in North Dartmouth, Massachusetts. The room had not existed when Lillian purchased the home. Agents also discovered a cane inside the room, which they believed may have been used by Webb after being shot in the leg by Adams. The lawsuit had to be dropped in exchange for the revelation due to criminal and civil immunity.

On June 15, 2017, the FBI released newly acquired photographs of Webb taken in the 1970s. They hoped these would aid in gaining the public's assistance in either capturing Webb or locating his remains. Faced with prosecution for harboring a criminal, Lillian Webb arranged to confess to police and the FBI. She told about sheltering Webb, and the strokes he suffered near the end of his life. He had been treated for four weeks in Tobey Hospital in Wareham, Massachusetts, under an assumed name for a compound fracture to his leg in 1980 after the murder.

She led the FBI to human remains buried on the grounds of her Dartmouth home. On July 17, 2017, the remains were identified by FBI forensic investigators as belonging to Webb. The investigators found that Webb had died in 1999 after suffering multiple strokes. State police documents said that Webb had lived for nearly 19 years hidden by his wife in the two different houses she lived in at that time.
