= Maghfoor Mansoor =

Former fugitive

FBI Ten Most Wanted Fugitive
- Charges: Rape; Carjacking; Armed robbery; Armed kidnapping; Murder (Hit-and-run)

Description
- Born: March 9, 1966; Pakistan
- Died: May 11, 2001 (aged 35); New York, United States
- Cause of death: Police shootout (two shots to the stomach)
- Nationality: Pakistani
- Gender: Male
- Occupation: Cab driver and tour guide

Status
- Added: May 23, 2001
- Number: 463
- Deceased prior to capture

Maghfoor Mansoor (March 9, 1966 – May 11, 2001) was a U.S.-based Pakistani native who worked as a cab driver and tour guide. He was a fugitive in the United States who had been on the FBI Ten Most Wanted Fugitives list.

During his crime rampage, he had committed a variety of criminal acts in several U.S. states, including sexual assault, robbery, and carjacking, and he caused the death of one person working on a construction site in a hit and run accident while attempting to flee law enforcement.

His spree ended on May 11, 2001, in a New York hotel when he was shot to death by law enforcement agents. He was 35 years old.

It was believed that compulsive gambling was his motivation for his life of crime as he became desperate to obtain money for additional gambling.

In 2002, the story of Mansoor's life of crime was aired on The FBI Files, in an episode titled "High Stakes."

== Crimes ==
Mansoor was either convicted of or wanted for the following crimes:

- In 1996, he was convicted of sexually abusing a 14-year-old girl. He served 6 months in prison.
- In 1997, he was sentenced to 11 months in prison for violating the conditions of a plea agreement.
- Kidnap and sexual assault of a 17-year-old girl in Las Vegas
- Was the suspect in a 1998 Las Vegas rape case, but was never charged
- Robbery of the Trump Taj Mahal hotel of over $500,000 in cash and valuables
- On January 9, 2001, he was wanted for causing the death of a construction worker in Louisiana. This occurred after he was attempting to purchase a ticket at Louis Armstrong New Orleans International Airport in New Orleans, when the sales clerk became suspicious of him and alerted police. Confronted by officers, he dashed into the airport's parking garage and carjacked a woman. He then led police on a high speed chase with the stolen vehicle, which he crashed into the worker, causing fatal injuries.

== Manhunt ==
During a national manhunt for Mansoor, he was difficult to catch or identify. He had used a large number of aliases, disguises, and stolen identities, making the determination of his identity or nationality a challenge for law enforcement.
