= Billy Ray Waldon =

American inmate formerly sentenced to death

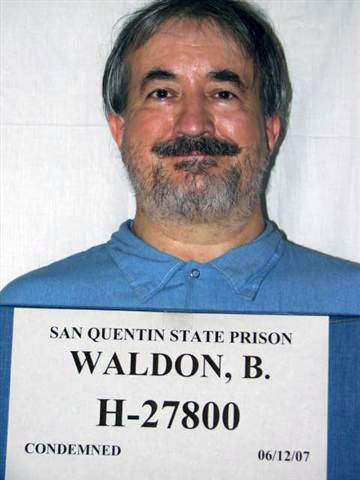
- Waldon's 2007 California Department of Corrections and Rehabilitation photo

FBI Ten Most Wanted Fugitive
- Charges: Murder; Attempted murder; Robbery; Burglary; Rape; Arson

Description
- Born: January 3, 1952 (age 74); Tahlequah, Oklahoma, U.S.
- Race: White
- Gender: Male
- Height: 6 ft 2 in (188 cm)
- Weight: 160 lb (73 kg)

Status
- Penalty: Death; (overturned)
- Status: Conviction overturned
- Added: April 23, 1986
- Caught: June 16, 1986
- Number: 399
- Captured

Billy Ray Waldon (born January 3, 1952), also known as Billy Joe Waldon or Nvwtohiyada Idehesdi Sequoyah (Cherokee: ᏅᏙᎯᏯᏓ ᎢᏕᎮᏍᏗ ᏎᏉᏯ, Nvdohiyada Idehesdi Sequoya), is an American former fugitive, American Indian Movement activist, and Esperantist who, in 1986, became the 399th fugitive listed by the FBI to the Ten Most Wanted Fugitives List. Waldon was convicted of the murders of three people during a crime spree in 1985.

A native of Oklahoma, Waldon was apprehended on June 16, 1986, after San Diego, California police attempted to pull him over for a routine traffic citation. In 1992, Waldon was convicted of three counts of murder and sentenced to death in California. In 2023, Waldon's convictions were overturned by the California Supreme Court on grounds that he was denied representation by competent counsel.

== Criminal history ==
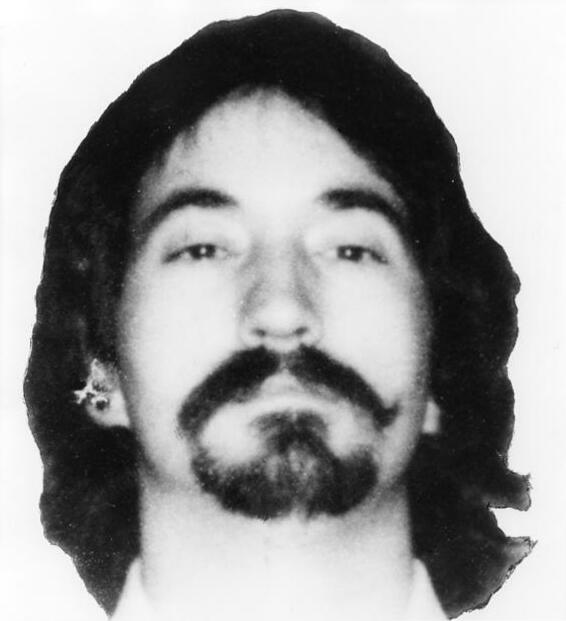
Waldon in 1985

=== Crimes ===
The crime spree which Waldon was convicted of began in Tulsa, Oklahoma on October 10, 1985, when a man was robbed and wounded. On November 15, a 28-year-old woman was shot in the head. However, the bullet grazed her skull and she survived. Two days later, on November 17, a woman was robbed at gunpoint and shot. The woman died of her injuries two days later. On November 23, two people were shot and wounded while getting out of their car.

Two weeks later, the San Diego, California home of 43-year-old Dawn Ellerman was broken into. Ellermann was fatally shot in the neck. Ellerman's 13-year-old daughter died of smoke inhalation while trying to rescue her mother from the house, which had been set on fire. On December 19, a man later identified as Waldon was spotted fleeing a robbery in his car by police, who soon gave chase. Waldon managed to evade the police and abandoned the car, soon after running to the residence of 59-year-old Gordon Wells, who was shot and killed. Later, Wells' neighbor was shot and wounded, and his car was stolen. The car was found abandoned in late January 1986. A ballistics test linked the San Diego crimes to the Oklahoma crimes, and a federal arrest warrant for Waldon was issued soon after.

=== Manhunt and capture ===
The federal arrest warrant charged Waldon with unlawful interstate flight to avoid prosecution for murder, attempted murder, robbery, burglary, rape and arson. According to the FBI, Waldon had held a variety of different jobs and had served in the U.S. Navy for ten years, where he had been trained in deep sea diving. Waldon was additionally noted to speak and understand several different languages, including French, Italian, Japanese, Spanish, and Esperanto. Waldon was reported to be one-fourth Cherokee Indian and to have an interest in Cherokee history and culture.

On April 23, 1986, Waldon became the 399th fugitive to be listed on the FBI's Ten Most Wanted Fugitive's list. In June 1986, Daniel Roman discovered that his 1965 Mustang was missing. Later that day, a driver in a car matching the description of Roman's attempted to speed away from police and fled on foot when they tried to stop him for a broken tail light. Police apprehended and arrested the man, who gave his name as “Stephen Midas” but was later identified as Waldon through a fingerprint match.

== Legal proceedings ==
=== Pre-trial and charges ===
In California, Waldon faced charges on three counts of murder as well as 19 other counts, including rape, armed robbery, and arson. Waldon was additionally charged in Oklahoma with first-degree murder in the November 17, 1985 shooting in Tulsa, as well as three counts of attempted murder, two counts of armed robbery, and two counts of attempted robbery. Waldon was arraigned on June 20, 1986, and plead not guilty to the charges. His bail was set at $2 million. In July 1986, while in custody at the San Diego County Jail, Waldon was beaten unconscious by three other inmates after he refused their request to kill another inmate. Waldon attempted to escape from his jail cell on September 21, 1986, by attempting to chip away at the cell's wall using a metal bar. Prior to a hearing to determine whether or not Waldon was mentally competent to stand trial, Jack Levitt, the judge who was set to preside over the hearing, was challenged by Waldon's attorney Charles Khoury Jr., who alleged him to be unfair. Levitt would be removed from presiding over Waldon's criminal trial in October 1987, but continued to preside over Waldon's mental competency hearing. The hearing began on August 18, 1987. Waldon remained completely silent during proceedings and refused to answer any questions. On September 21, 1987, Waldon was judged competent to be criminally tried. Waldon's criminal trial was delayed by Judge Levitt's removal, and was further delayed by his insistence that he represent himself.

=== Trial and sentencing ===
After Waldon's judgement that he was competent to stand trial, his criminal trial began in 1991. Waldon wished to represent himself in court, but a judge denied this motion, stating that Waldon could not understand the risks of self-representation. However, a second judge granted his request to represent himself. During his trial, Waldon alleged that he had been beaten by federal agents and framed for the crimes over his 'promotion of Indian autonomy'. Waldon additionally claimed that during his fugitive state, he had hid in the crawlspace of a house in Imperial Beach, fearing that he would be convicted anyway if he pleaded innocent. Waldon was convicted of three counts of first degree murder, as well as multiple counts of attempted murder, rape, burglary, robbery, and animal cruelty in December 1991 and was sentenced to death in February 1992.

=== Conviction overturned ===
On January 23, 2023, Waldon's murder convictions and death sentences were overturned on grounds of courtroom behavior, his 'delusional' self-representation and a trial court judge's decision that had improperly allowed him to represent himself "without considering (the other judge's) denial or the evidence on which it was based" had deprived him of competent legal representation. The California State supreme court granted Waldon a new trial.

== Poliespo ==
Poliespo
- Poliespo, Po
- Created by: Billy Ray Waldon
- Date: Likely began in the 1950s or 1960s
- Users: Unknown, at least one
- Purpose: Constructed language: International auxiliary language; Poliespo
- Writing system: Latin
- Sources: Phonology derived from Esperanto, vocabulary mostly from Esperanto, but also partially English and Spanish, plus two words from Cherokee, grammar from Esperanto and Cherokee.

Language codes
- ISO 639-3: None (mis)
- Glottolog: None

Poliespo (Polisinteza Esperanto, "Polysynthetic Esperanto", also Po) is an international auxiliary language created by Waldon. Waldon ran a "World Poliespo Organization" for enthusiasts of the language.

=== Goals ===
The principle of creation for Poliespo was Waldon's belief that certain languages contain words that made communication quicker, which he referred to as "lightning bolts" or "lightning words", and the goal was to combine as many of these as possible into one language. The language was originally referred to as "Anagalisgi," the romanized form of Cherokee word for lightning. Most of Poliespo comes from Cherokee, English, Esperanto, and Spanish, the languages that Waldon could speak.

The philosophy behind the language is reminiscent of sound symbolism, and therefore radically differs from the principles of Esperanto.

Waldon also claimed that learning Poliespo is a golden opportunity to acquire an "Iroquoian spirit." In his words, "When one gains a new language, one gains a new soul. Po is your golden chance to acquire an Iroquoian spirit."

=== Phonology ===
Poliespo is believed to have 32 consonants, including the glottal stop, in addition to 22 vowels: 10 oral vowels (two of which are distinguished by vowel length) and nine nasal vowels, one of which is distinguished by vowel length. Poliespo is also a tonal language, having three or four tones. The rising tone is the only tone that is marked, using an acute accent.

Poliespo Consonants

	Bilabial		Dental		Alveolar		Post- alveolar		Palatal	Velar		Glottal
Nasal	m				n							
Stop	p	b					t	d		k	ɡ	/ʔ/
Preaspirated Nasal	m̆ /ʰm/				n̆ /ʰn/							
Preaspirated Stop	b̆ /ʰb/									k̆ /ʰk/		
Labialized Stop	pw /pʷ/											
Affricate					c /t͡s/		ĉ /t͡ʃ/	ĝ /d͡ʒ/				
Fricative	f	v	t̂ /θ/	tv /ð/	s	z	ŝ /ʃ/	ĵ /ʒ/	y /ç/	ĥ /x/		h
Approximant	ŭ /w/				l				j	(ŭ /w/)		
Trill					r							

Poliespo Oral Vowels

	Front		Central		Back
Close	i | i: /iː/	ĭ /ɪ/ | ĭ: /ɪː/			u
Mid	e		x /ə/	q /ɜ~ɝ/	o
Open	ⱥ /æ/		a		w /ɔ/

Poliespo Nasal Vowels

	Front		Central		Back
Close	î /ɪ̃/	î: /ɪ̃ː/			û /ũ/
Mid	ê /ẽ/		2 /ə̃/	q̂ /ɜ̃~ɝ̃/	ô /õ/
Open	ⱥ̂ /æ̃/		â /ã/		ŵ /ɔ̃/

=== Orthography ===
Poliespo's alphabet consists of 54 letters: a, â, ⱥ, ⱥ̂, b, b̆, c, ĉ, d, e, ê, f, g, ĝ, h, ĥ, i, ĭ, ĭ:, ĭ́, î, î:, î́, j, ĵ, k, k̆, l, m, m̆, n, n̆, o, ô, p, pw , s, ŝ, t, t̂, tv , u, û, ŭ, v, z, ẑ, z̆, q, q́, q̂, q̂́, w, ẃ, ŵ, ŵ́, x, x́, y, 2, 2́. In addition, the consonant ẑ represents /kts/, while the consonant z̆ represents /gdz/. pw is p overstruck with w, and tv is t overstruck with v.

=== Grammar ===
The structure is more similar to Ido than to Esperanto, since radicals are inflected. Unlike Ido, Poliespo has only one prefix in addition to those of Esperanto: pe-, which is used to indicate the "neuter" gender. Besides the accusative case, there is also a subject suffix, as in Korean and Japanese. In Poliespo, there are two forms of oral speech. If one does not understand what someone says in Poliespo (referred to as Idpo), they should repeat themselves in Esperanto (referred to as Zaespo).

banant̂ⱥn2plaĉqlx!
banana-PL.SING-like-DAT-HAB
"I don't like bananas!"

== See also ==
- FBI Ten Most Wanted Fugitives, 1980s
- List of death row inmates in the United States
