= Arthur Lee Washington Jr. =

American fugitive

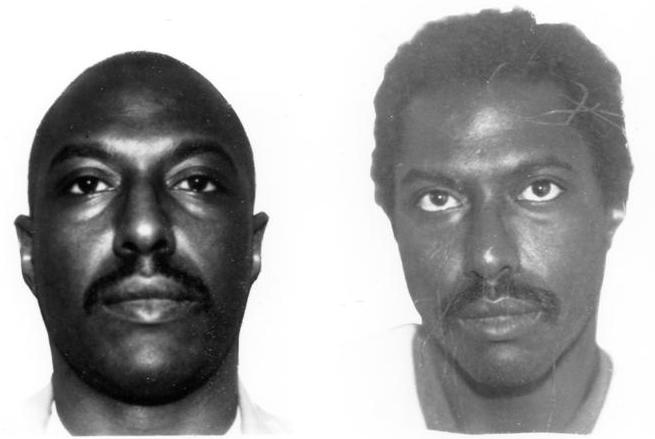
- FBI profile images of Arthur Lee Washington, Jr.

FBI Ten Most Wanted Fugitive
- Charges: Attempted murder; Unlawful Flight to Avoid Prosecution
- Alias: Arthur L. Washington. Jr.; Azikikwe E. Onipedo

Description
- Born: November 30, 1949 (age 76); Monmouth County, New Jersey, U.S.
- Nationality: American
- Gender: Male
- Height: 6 ft 1 in (185 cm)
- Occupation: Laborer

Status
- Added: October 18, 1989
- Removed: December 27, 2000
- Number: 427
- Removed from Top Ten Fugitive List

Arthur Lee Washington Jr. (November 30, 1949 – disappeared April 12, 1989) is an American fugitive and former member of the Black Liberation Army wanted for the attempted murder of a New Jersey state trooper on April 12, 1989. Washington was added to the Federal Bureau of Investigation's Top Ten Most Wanted Fugitives list on October 18, 1989. He remained on the list for over a decade. He was eventually dropped from the list on December 27, 2000, for no longer meeting the list criteria. He is still wanted by New Jersey State Police, although he is presumed deceased.

== Attempted murder ==
On April 12, 1989, New Jersey state trooper Michael J. Clayton stopped a 1979 Ford Thunderbird for an expired inspection sticker. Washington, who was a passenger in the vehicle, got out of the car and walked away. Clayton ordered him to stop but Washington ignored his commands. As Clayton began to give chase, Washington pulled out a .45 caliber semi-automatic handgun from his jacket and began firing at Clayton. Clayton returned fire, but as he paused to reload, Washington escaped on foot. No one was injured during the shootout.

== Fugitive ==
Police searched Washington's apartment in Asbury Park and found three other weapons; a machine gun and two handguns. A federal arrest warrant was issued for Washington on April 14, charging him with Unlawful Flight to Avoid Prosecution and attempted murder.

Washington was added to the FBI's Ten Most Wanted Fugitives list on October 18, 1989. He was the 427th fugitive to be placed on the list. He remained on the list for over eleven years, until he was removed on December 27, 2000, for no longer meeting the list criteria. He was replaced by Eric Franklin Rosser.

Washington still remains a fugitive and is wanted by New Jersey State Police, although by now he is believed to be dead.

== See also ==
- List of fugitives from justice who disappeared
