= Gilbert James Everett =

American bank robber

Gilbert Everett
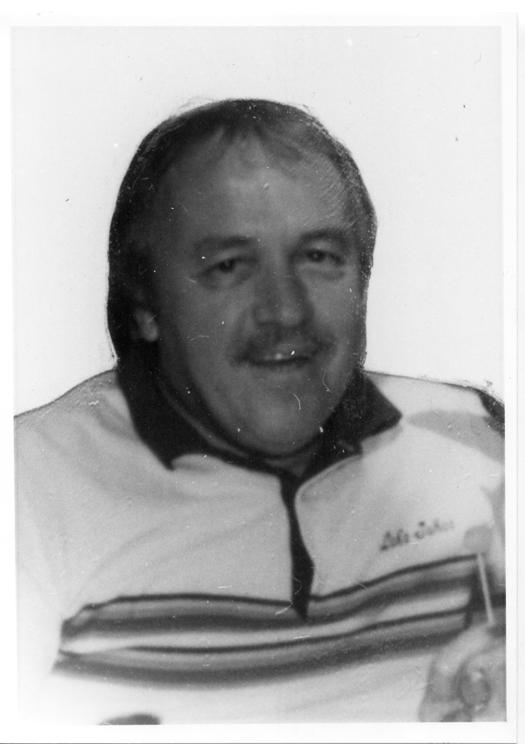

FBI Ten Most Wanted Fugitive
- Charges: Bank robbery

Description
- Born: Gilbert James Everett; June 26, 1939; Hamilton, Ohio, U.S.
- Died: December 16, 2005 (aged 66); Hamilton, Ohio, U.S.
- Race: White
- Gender: Male

Status
- Penalty: 20 years in prison
- Added: May 13, 1981
- Caught: August 12, 1985
- Number: 376
- Captured

Gilbert James Everett (June 26, 1939 – December 16, 2005) was an American bank robber whose crime spree in the Southeastern United States during the early 1980s resulted in him being listed on the FBI's Ten Most Wanted list for over four years.

== Background ==
Working on and off as a car salesman, a mapmaker and a topographer, Everett was arrested in September 1980 following a bank robbery in Knoxville, Tennessee and convicted of armed robbery. However, after escaping from federal custody less than a month later, he fled to Alabama in a stolen car in violation of the Dyer Act. After another bank robbery in Orlando, Florida, additional warrants against Everett were filed in November, and he was eventually added to the FBI's Ten Most Wanted list on May 13, 1981, for over 86 bank robberies.

== Capture and aftermath ==
Evading authorities for a year and a half, Everett robbed another bank in Sacramento, California in January 1983. Everett took up residency in the State of Arkansas. Three years later, Officer Kevin Faler from the Hot Springs Police Department at Hot Springs National Park, along with other officers, arrested him on August 12, 1985, after a 45-minute vehicle pursuit. After the pursuit, Everett was found in possession of a loaded 357 Magnum, stolen bank money and a hand-held programmable police scanner along with a piece of graph paper outlining the map of Arkansas counties with police frequency codes. He was subsequently arrested and again tried escaping from the city jail at least twice. He was subsequently imprisoned in a Federal penitentiary in the State of Kentucky sentenced to 20 years. According to Officer Tony Bishop of the Hot Springs Police Department, Everett was a violent man with a violent past. Officer Kevin Faler received a commendation for the capture of the F.B.I.'s Ten Most Wanted in America.

== Later life ==
After serving 18 years in prison, Everett was released in 2003 and died in 2005.

Described in his obituary as a gifted artist, he died in an Ohio hospice in 2005. He was survived by two daughters.

== Sources ==
- Newton, Michael. Encyclopedia of Robbers, Heists, and Capers. New York: Facts On File Inc., 2002.
