= Darren Dee O'Neall =

American former fugitive (born 1960)

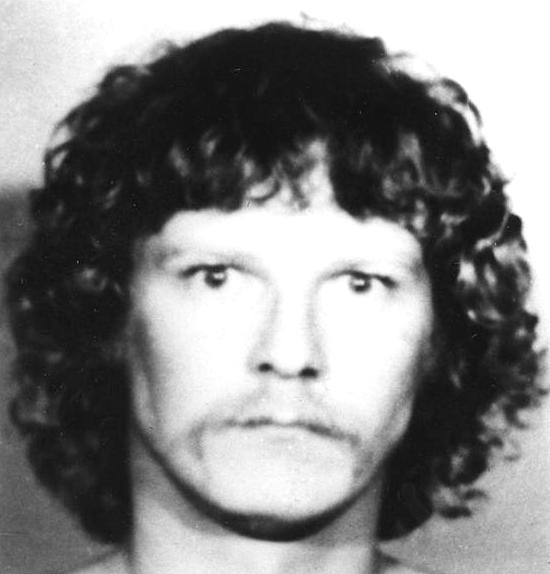
- Photograph taken 1986
- Born: Darren Dee O'Neall; February 26, 1960 (age 66); Albuquerque, New Mexico, U.S.
- Other names: Herb Johnson; Jerry Zebulun Macranahan; Larry Sackett; Mike James Johnson; John Mayeaux
- Occupations: Truck driver Laminator; Woodworker; Bartender
- Years active: 1982–1987
- Height: 5 ft 11 in (180 cm)
- Status: Currently imprisoned in Whatcom County, Washington
- Motive: Sexual sadism
- Convictions: Washington State; First-degree murder Auto theft Oregon; Kidnapping; Rape
- Criminal charges: Homicide; Kidnapping; Rape; Sodomy
- Penalty: Washington State; 27 years, 9 months imprisonment Oregon; 135 years imprisonment
- Time at large: January 27–September 22, 1987

Details
- Victims: 1–6+
- Country: United States
- States: Colorado, Oregon, Washington, Idaho, Utah
- Locations: Colorado Springs, Colorado; Portland, Oregon; Edgewood, Washington; Greenwater, Washington; Bellingham, Washington; Interstate 84 in Idaho
- Weapon: Claw hammer
- Date apprehended: September 22, 1987

Darren Dee O'Neall (born February 26, 1960) is an American convicted murderer, serial rapist, suspected serial killer, and former fugitive. O'Neall was convicted of the kidnapping and rape of a 14-year-old girl in Portland, Oregon, after having already been convicted of the kidnapping and murder of Robin Smith in Edgewood, Washington. O'Neall was suspected to have killed six women in total.

== Early life ==
Darren Dee O'Neall was born in Albuquerque, New Mexico, on February 26, 1960, to Darrell and Christa O'Neall. The family primarily resided in Colorado Springs, Colorado. O'Neall was the youngest of his brothers, Michael and Kevin, and had a younger sister named Kristen. Darrell O'Neall was drafted into the army while raising the family, and as a result the family would move to numerous cities where he was stationed, including Bad Tölz in Bavaria, Germany and Fort Polk, Louisiana. This was later attributed to O'Neall's growing into being a drifter in adulthood. O'Neall's high school years were spent in Fort Polk, where he met his future wife, June Hodges. They had a son, Christopher, who was adopted by O'Neall's parents and raised in Colorado Springs while O'Neall was a fugitive. O'Neall also had a common-law marriage to a woman in Levittown, Pennsylvania, with whom he had his second son Jason, in spite of not being divorced from June. O'Neall enlisted in the army and was stationed in Bremerhaven, Germany, before being discharged on February 28, 1982. O'Neall was last reported as being back in Colorado Springs before his crime spree began.

O'Neall was a passionate reader of western novels by American author Louis L'Amour, having sent letters to the novelist himself that were never received, and he took numerous aliases from L'Amour's novels. O'Neall would canvas country and western bars during his travels, places reported to have also been his comfort zone when scouting for victims. Federal Bureau of Investigation (FBI) offender profilers, who saw O'Neall to fit the classic serial killer pathology, assumed his life and crimes revolved around living in Western and outlaw fantasies akin to his favorite literature.

Throughout 1982, the police in Colorado Springs knew O'Neall from his criminal record, which included various public indecencies. In November 1984, O'Neall was charged with sexually assaulting a woman, but as she ended up disappearing, the charges were reduced to aggravated robbery and then dropped altogether. In July 1986, O'Neall was arrested for second-degree sexual assault, but soon absconded, and a warrant for his arrest was issued. O'Neall is also heavily suspected of numerous other sex crimes extending as far as Germany, from while he was with his parents to his time serving in the military.

== Crimes ==
=== January 1987 rape-kidnapping ===
After arriving in Washington state, O'Neall reconnected with a former high school classmate who was living there. O'Neall was encouraged to stay and found an old duplex in Puyallup, before acquiring a truck-driving job in Tacoma. While on his way to Portland, Oregon, during the evening of January 17, 1987, O'Neall spotted a fourteen-year-old teenage girl walking on a freeway to a convenience store. O'Neall drove past her a second time, then parked his truck and waited for her to leave. When she left with soda and candy, O'Neall abducted her, threatening with a knife and an unseen Ruger revolver to kill her if she screamed or tried to fight or run. Driving her to a secluded unpaved location while she was tied and gagged in the sleeping compartment, O'Neall stripped, raped, and sodomized the girl for several hours. O'Neall eventually released the girl, driving her to a spot where she could reach home easily and left her on the side of the road. She went straight to a truck stop, where an employee drove her back home. A rape exam was conducted to collect evidence, and the girl was questioned for a description, but O'Neall had already fled. He changed his appearance and moved to Edgewood, Washington, where he found work as a laminator under the alias Herb Johnson.

=== Murder of Robin Smith ===
O'Neall met Mary Barnes in March, eventually beginning a relationship with her. O'Neall would eventually want to target another woman, heading to Baldy's Tavern in Puyallup with Mary on the 27th. When it was past midnight, he saw 22-year-old Robin Smith, who was with her fiancé Larron Crowston. Wanting to get Smith alone, O'Neall made Barnes declare an "after hours party" at their apartment to the patrons present. Crowston left the apartment before Robin did to go fishing, and after Barnes left the apartment for a few hours, she returned to see O'Neall and Smith weren't there any longer. Smith's family friend Jim Chaney later questioned O'Neall, and a witness there at the time stated that he saw a leg in the trunk with a purple and white sock.

Crowston returned from his trip and slept, waking up to realize Smith still hadn't returned. After calling her mother Edna, who replied she wasn't at her home either, they reported her disappearance to the Pierce County Sheriff's Office. After Smith's family and acquaintances gave a description of her to police detectives, they searched Barnes' apartment, where O'Neall had taken various supplies. An arrest warrant was issued for O'Neall on charges of evading justice, and his description was disseminated across the country and to nearby police departments.

Two days later, a hospital took in a patient matching O'Neall's description, covered in cuts and other injuries from his face downward. They remembered he had a teardrop tattoo next to his eye and "JUNE" across his knuckles. O'Neall left without treatment. A flagman later saw O'Neall try to get past roadwork near Mount Rainier, stop his car on the side of the road for a half hour, then turn around; investigators believed he was finding a place to dispose of Smith's dead body. The day after, on March 30, the car O'Neall was seen driving was found abandoned at a rest stop north of Everett, Washington by a state trooper, covered in blood and human remains. Smith's bloodstained jacket was additionally discovered. A seller at the impound lot the car was taken to soon called the police when reading a news report on O'Neall and the car. The Chrysler was revealed to have been stolen from a truck driver in Nampa, Idaho, who met O'Neall when he was hitchhiking under the alias of Jerry Zebulun Macranahan in 1986.

Edna Smith led months of searches through Greenwater, Washington, where Robin Smith was buried. Dozens of volunteers combed through the wilderness in the area. On May 25, hikers eventually found bones in the woods across an area near a stream. As police were understaffed and low-funded at the time and needed Smith's full skeleton to identify her, Edna Smith herself contributed efforts and found and collected the rest of the skeleton she could find that would later be confirmed to be her daughter's remains. Smith couldn't be identified easily through forensics, as her blood type wasn't registered, and dental records were difficult to locate since she hadn't seen a dentist in years, but the clothes she was wearing when she disappeared were found folded at the scene, and her wallet and ID were found inside a nearby tree. Forensic anthropology analyses revealed Smith was killed by blunt-force trauma, and a rusty hammer was found in a nearby stream, confirmed as the weapon O'Neall bludgeoned Smith to death with. An arrest warrant was issued charging O'Neall with first-degree murder in Smith's death.

Around the same time, the teenage girl O'Neall previously kidnapped and raped was tracked down when police were scouring additional offenses across Washington and nearby states in hopes of following O'Neall's movements. The girl positively identified O'Neall out of a photo lineup without hesitation, and O'Neall was charged with the crime.

=== Disappearance of Wendy Aughe ===
On April 24, O'Neall appeared in Bellingham, Washington under the alias of Mike James Johnson, finding work as a bartender at the La Paloma restaurant. He went on a date with 29-year-old Wendy Aughe, a single mother of two children. Aughe disappeared after she and O'Neall left the restaurant the next early morning. Aughe's mother went to her home soon after her daughter's babysitter said she never arrived and found an undisturbed scene of blood all over Aughe's bedroom, prompting a police investigation. Aughe's wallet, keys, and car were also gone. There were also traces of blond hair that wasn't Aughe's, an acrylic nail from when she went to a salon before the date, and dried semen. Spatters of her blood with growing velocity heavily conveyed she was attacked and presumably killed from repeated strikes. Her clothes she wore that day were folded and wedged between her bed and an adjacent wall.

The restaurant owner revealed O'Neall just wrote information down for his application on a placemat, which was taken as evidence along with Wendy's bed. He worked at the restaurant for two days, ending his time with clearing the cash register and making off with the money and a bottle of liquor. The listed address on the placemat was the city Lighthouse Mission homeless shelter, where O'Neall was alleged to be moving in with a woman he met. O'Neall drove off in Aughe's car despite not having it beforehand. After releasing an all-points bulletin, a United States Customs showed O'Neall crossing back into America from Canada at Oroville, Washington, alone in Aughe's car. The car was found ditched in a tavern parking lot in Eugene, Oregon on May 2, where O'Neall was also spotted trying to sell a gold necklace. Prints on a Burger King hamburger box found in the car and on the placemat were identified as O'Neall's, and clothing in the car were found to have been loaned to him from Lighthouse Mission. FBI Agent Dell Orris was assigned to the investigation when the Pierce County police placed a call to the bureau.

== Fugitive Status, Arrest, and Identification ==
Police recovered documents that showed O'Neall's aliases, including a medical card under his Macranahan alias. He also reportedly went by Larry Sackett while residing in Idaho before he went on the run. Tracking his aliases to characters in Western novels by Louis L'Amour, the police requested his assistance to find him. The details of the fantasies O'Neall wanted to live out were still implemented into his psychological profile, and the same task force assigned to apprehending the "Green River Killer" also investigated O'Neall before ruling out his relation to their case. Edna Smith was a major contributor in spreading awareness of the case, working to distribute wanted posters across the Pacific Northwest, concentrating on locations O'Neall might visit. Throughout the summer of 1987, sightings of O'Neall were reported in the Midwest and the South. His long-standing fugitive state prompted the FBI to list O'Neall on the FBI Ten Most Wanted Fugitives list.

O'Neall took on the alias "John Mayeaux" by the time he found a girlfriend in Tennessee. After abandoning the woman in Louisiana and stealing her car, O'Neall went to Lakeland, Florida. On September 22, police pulled O'Neall over for a traffic violation, but he attempted to escape, prompting a chase. O'Neall attempted to escape on foot after crashing his car into a curb, but was soon caught. In February 1988, O'Neall was positively identified through fingerprint analysis. As O'Neall refused to speak to police, Edna Smith publicly spearheaded his extradition back to Washington state, which was successful.

== Trials, Guilty Plea, and Convictions ==
Jury selection started on January 4, 1989. O'Neall agreed to a guilty plea for Robin Smith's murder in exchange for a reduced prison sentence. O'Neall was sentenced to 27 years and 9 months in prison, the maximum sentence available under his plea deal. He would be eligible for parole after 18 years. Soon after, O'Neall was extradited back to Oregon to stand trial for the January 1987 kidnapping and rape. After a detailed testimony from the victim, O'Neall was convicted of the majority of the multiple counts he faced. Judge Kimberly Frankel sentenced O'Neall to 135 years in prison, to be served concurrently with his sentence in Washington.

In 1989, O'Neal was charged with and found guilty of auto theft in relation to Aughe's disappearance. From the efforts of Washington State Patrol Crime Laboratory, DNA evidence at the scene was identified as O'Neall's in August 2015. Additional samples of O'Neall's blood were obtained in November 2020 from a pair of men's pants found in the car and confirmed to be his in 2021 from a cheek swab obtained from him. O'Neall was charged with second degree murder on grounds of probable cause in October 2022, and was extradited from Two Rivers Correctional Institution in Umatilla, Oregon to Whatcom County Jail. In December 2022, the prosecution requested the Oregon Department of Corrections to obtain custody of O'Neall. O'Neall made his first court appearance on March 2, 2023, and his bail set at $10 million. O'Neall was arraigned March 10, and pleaded not guilty to Aughe's murder.

== Other Crimes ==
O'Neall is the prime suspect in the kidnapping and murder of 22-year-old Lia Elizabeth Szubert. On June 9, 1987, Szubert was heading from Twin Falls, Idaho for Boise to reach the airport where her fiancé, Daune Abbott, was meeting her. Szubert experienced car trouble on Interstate 84 near Mountain Home. A friend she called from a truck stop was the last person to hear from her. When she didn't arrive, her family reported her missing. On June 13, motorists east of La Grande, Oregon discovered her decomposing corpse. She had evidently been strangled to death. Several witnesses saw a man matching O'Neall's description at several nearby locations along the interstate, as well as in Spokane, Washington hours after Szubert went missing. O'Neall is also suspected of the failed kidnapping of a woman in Burley, Idaho a week after, though no further details have been provided.

Police in Salt Lake City, Utah considered O'Neall a person of interest in the shooting deaths of three women between 1985 and 1986. O'Neall was reportedly cleared as a suspect due to an alibi out of state, and inquiries were dropped.

== See also ==
- Ted Bundy, American serial killer and fugitive active in the Pacific Northwest.
- Terry Peder Rasmussen, a.k.a. "The Chameleon Killer", American cross-country serial killer known for his numerous aliases as a fugitive.
- Andrew Cunanan, American spree killer who changed his appearance in simple ways to stay on the run.
- FBI Ten Most Wanted Fugitives, 1980s
