= Claude Dallas =

American convicted felon

Claude Lafayette Dallas Jr.
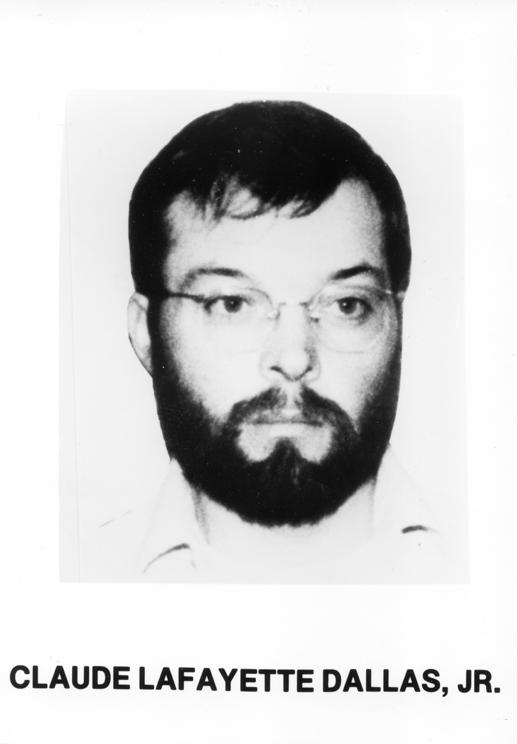

FBI Ten Most Wanted Fugitive

Description
- Born: March 11, 1950 (age 76); Winchester, Virginia
- Gender: Male

Status
- Convictions: Voluntary manslaughter Use of a firearm in the commission of a felony (2 counts); Concealment of evidence
- Penalty: 30 years imprisonment
- Added: May 16, 1986
- Caught: March 8, 1987
- Number: 400
- Captured

Claude Lafayette Dallas Jr. (born March 11, 1950) is an American cowboy and felon convicted of voluntary manslaughter in the deaths of two game wardens in Idaho. On May 16, 1986, he became the 400th fugitive listed on the FBI Ten Most Wanted List.

== Biography ==
Born in Winchester, Virginia, the son of a dairy farmer, Dallas was the second of six brothers in a family of nine children. When he was young, his family moved from the Shenandoah Valley to Michigan and Claude Dallas spent most of his childhood in Luce County, later moving to rural Morrow County, Ohio, where he helped milk cows and learned to trap and hunt game.

As a boy, Dallas read many books about the Old West and dreamed of someday living as the 19th century characters in the books he read. He graduated from Mount Gilead High School in 1967, then headed out west, hitchhiking most of the way across the United States, finally landing in Oregon where he earned a living as a ranch hand and trapper.

Out of contact with his family back east, he claimed to have been unaware of draft notices mailed to his parents' home ordering him to report for induction into the U.S. military during the Vietnam War. When Dallas failed to report for induction into the military on September 17, 1970, the government issued a warrant for his arrest.

He was eventually tracked down more than three years later by the FBI. Dallas was arrested for draft dodging on October 15, 1973, despite the fact that it had already been announced by Secretary of Defense Melvin Laird earlier that same year that no further draft orders would be issued effectively ending conscription in the U.S.

He was transported back to Ohio and released into the custody of his parents. At trial, the draft board could not prove that Dallas, who was working as a cowboy on the remote Alvord Ranch, a vast spread in southeastern Oregon, ever knew of the induction letters and the charges were dropped, but the experience led Dallas to deeply distrust the government.

Dallas was charged with the murder of two state game wardens on January 5, 1981 in remote Owyhee County in southwestern Idaho. He eluded capture for over fifteen months, until he was arrested in northern Nevada by FBI Special Agent Franz Nenzel and SWAT officer Dave Gillan on April 18, 1982, north of Winnemucca, after he was shot and wounded in the leg during a car chase and shootout. Convicted that October and sentenced to 30 years, Dallas escaped from prison on March 30, 1986, and eluded law enforcement officials for nearly a year. To increase the chances of his capture, Dallas was listed on the ten most wanted list of the FBI. He was finally apprehended outside a convenience store in the suburban southern California city of Riverside on March 8, 1987.

Dallas attracted national media attention after both incidents, becoming a particularly controversial figure in Idaho, Oregon, and Northern Nevada. Some within the region regarded him as a folk hero, defying the government by defending his right to live off the land; while others, shocked and disgusted, saw him simply as a coldblooded cop killer. After manslaughter convictions in 1982, his prison escape trial ended in acquittal in 1987. Dallas served 22 years of a 30-year sentence and was released in February 2005.

== Killings ==
In the winter of 1981, Dallas had set up his trapping camp in the remote southwestern corner of Idaho, three miles (5 km) from the Nevada border using a "home" address in nearby Paradise Hill, Nevada, twenty miles from Paradise Valley. The Bureau of Land Management had leased the area known as Bull Basin to Don Carlin's 45 Ranch as wintering ground for its cattle.

Ten days before the murders, Don's son, Eddy Carlin, had stopped by the camp and checked Dallas out. He noted two illegal bobcat hides in Dallas' camp as well as poached deer. When Eddy Carlin mentioned to Dallas that Idaho Fish and Game would check the area out, Dallas retorted, "I'll be ready for them."

Eddy Carlin's meeting with Dallas had made him uneasy. Dallas had advised Carlin that he settled his business with a gun. Don and Eddy Carlin noted other trappers illegally poaching sage-grouse on the 45's leased land. They rode to a nearby Indian reservation to use the telephone and called Conservation Officer Bill Pogue of the Idaho Department of Fish and Game, at home and registered a complaint about the sage-grouse poachers on their land, but not Claude Dallas.

Pogue and officer Conley Elms responded to the complaint. When they were about to leave the Carlin ranch, Eddy Carlin's wife mentioned the guy at Bull Camp (Claude Dallas). At that point Eddy advised the officers about Dallas. Carlin warned them to be careful and told them that he did not trust Dallas.

Elms and Pogue looked into the sage-grouse poaching first, then approached Dallas regarding the alleged poaching infringements in his camp.

During his murder trial, Dallas testified that while Elms was inside a tent containing poached bobcats, Pogue drew his weapon, although there was no evidence to support this claim. Dallas reacted by shooting Pogue with his own 4" .357 caliber Ruger Security-Six handgun, which he habitually wore concealed. When Elms exited the tent, Dallas shot him too.

After the initial gunfire, Dallas used his .22 caliber lever action rifle to shoot both officers execution style, once each in the head. He then threw Elms' body in a nearby river and, with the reluctant assistance of a friend, Jim Stevens, transported Pogue's body to a distant location, where he hid it in a coyote's den.

Stevens, who happened to be visiting the trapper's camp that day, witnessed the shootings and saw Dallas shoot Elms and Pogue in the head as they lay on the ground. The Ruger Security-Six handgun was recovered by a local Idaho man using a metal detector in December 2008. Dallas fled the scene of the killings and was found after a 15-month manhunt.

== Trial ==
Dallas was charged with two counts of first degree murder, but the trial in Caldwell quickly shifted focus to the alleged aggressiveness of one of the victims, Officer Pogue. The issue did sway the jury to convict Dallas in October of lesser charges of voluntary manslaughter and of using a firearm in the commission of a crime.

At least one juror cited concern that Dallas was acting in self-defense when he shot Pogue. On January 4, 1983, Judge Edward Lodge sentenced Dallas to a total of 30 years, the maximum for the offenses for which he had been convicted. Dallas lost an appeal to the state supreme court in 1985. He was released from prison on February 5th, 2005, after serving 22 years.

== Prison and afterwards ==
Dallas escaped from the state prison east of Kuna on March 30, 1986, Easter Sunday, and was on the run for almost a year. His escape enlarged the legend that he was a nomadic trapper whose life conflicted with the government. Dallas was captured outside a 7-Eleven convenience store in Riverside, California, on March 8, 1987. Following his 1987 trial, he was placed in prisons in Nebraska and New Mexico and then in a high-security state prison in Kansas in July 1989. (Note: There has been controversy about Dallas's prison escape. Some investigators felt that Dallas just walked out of prison. The official account is that he cut fences to get out. George Baird, who was a correction employee on duty the night Dallas escaped said "I’ve believed for 20 years Claude Dallas walked out our front door....Somebody didn’t want embarrassment. Claude Dallas was a high-profile offender. Claude Dallas committed a hideous crime against people in law enforcement and angered a great big community.")

He completed the final three weeks of his sentence back in Idaho at Orofino in 2005. Dallas was released after serving 22 years in prison. His sentence was reduced by eight years for good behavior. He was released in February 2005, and since then he has been sighted living in Grouse Creek, Utah and in the Alaska wilderness.

== Claude Dallas in popular culture ==
- Ian Tyson's 1987 album, Cowboyography, includes a song entitled "Claude Dallas" telling the story of the incident; also recorded by Tom Russell
- True crime author Jack Olsen described Dallas and the murders in his book Give a Boy a Gun.
- Another book-length treatment of this subject is Outlaw by Jeff Long.
- The 1986 TV movie Manhunt for Claude Dallas is based on Long's book, it stars Matt Salinger as Dallas, Claude Akins as Bill Pogue and Brent Spiner as Jim Stevens.
- City Confidential episode 45 (2001) is an hour-long documentary on the homicide.
- FBI: The Untold Stories episode "Claude Dallas" (1992) is a half-hour-long docudrama about the murders. Dallas is portrayed by actor Joe Unger.
- Wild Game (1995) by Frank Bergon presents a fictionalized account of these events.
- The FBI Files episode "Murdering Cowboy" chronicled the murder and the subsequent events.
- Featured in Cort Conley's book (pp. 201–262) published in 1994 titled Idaho Loners: Hermits, Solitaries, and Individualists.
- Song "Claude Dallas" on the album Dalas! (2003) - a song by Czech singer Jan Vyčítal and his band Greenhorns.
- Song “Owyhee” on the album “Worth the Weight” (2011) by the Boise band Poke.
