= Christopher Jeburk =

American bank robber (born 1976)

- Born: Christopher Lawrence Jeburk; 1976 (age 49–50); Augusta, Georgia
- Occupations: Incarcerated, career criminal, bank robber, kidnapper, drug dealer
- Family: Jeburk

Christopher Lawrence Jeburk is an American convicted felon who successfully committed a string of bank robberies along the East Coast of the United States. He escaped four times from prison, twice from a regional detention center and twice while in federal custody, to commit more crimes. He is currently incarcerated in a maximum security penitentiary USP Terre Haute.

== Early life ==
Christopher Jeburk was born to a southern African-American family. He was raised a Christian.

== Crime ==
Beginning in 1995, at the age of 19, Jeburk started robbing banks. On October 13, 1995, Jeburk forced teller Amy Shaw, a native of North Augusta, South Carolina, to open the bank's vault by holding six members of her family hostage at gunpoint (with the help of Daniel Evans and Lamarko Rosco). The theft netted $86,000. This money has not been recovered. After conviction, but awaiting sentencing, Jeburk escaped the Columbia County Detention Center on March 27. Jeburk embarked on a string of bank robberies from Florida to New England, with the help of Kimberly Williams, Jameela McCullen, and a fellow escapee, Jerome Frierson-Bey. He was recaptured on May 9, he then re-escaped.

After this recapture, Jeburk was sentenced to life in prison for the robberies, the kidnapping, various theft charges, gun charges and drug charges. Several weeks into his sentence, where he was sent to the Leavenworth federal prison, he tried to escape from jail a third time by hiding underneath a prison laundry truck and hanging on, but an officer caught him before the truck could reach the front gate, at which point Jeburk was transferred to the Maximum Security Penitentiary in Atlanta where escape would be considerably more difficult, then later to Thomson.

== Media ==
The television show The FBI Files showed how the Jeburk (misspelled as Jibberk) case happened in the episode "Held Hostage".
