= Theft from Interstate Shipment =

Theft from Interstate Shipment is a legal classification of crime used for Section 659 of Title 18 of the United States Code. It prohibits the theft or fraudulent acquisition of goods that are part of an interstate or international shipment, whether from the carrier or a holding area, and also the willful buying, selling or possession of goods obtained in this way. Currently, if the value of the goods is under $100, it is punished as a misdemeanor; otherwise, it is a felony.

Investigations of Theft from Interstate Shipment are covered under Classification 15 of the FBI's central records system. This classification was established in 1922.

Theft from Interstate Shipment was particularly common during the Second World War, due to wartime shortages.
