= Ted Jeffrey Otsuki =

American criminal (born 1951)

Ted Otsuki
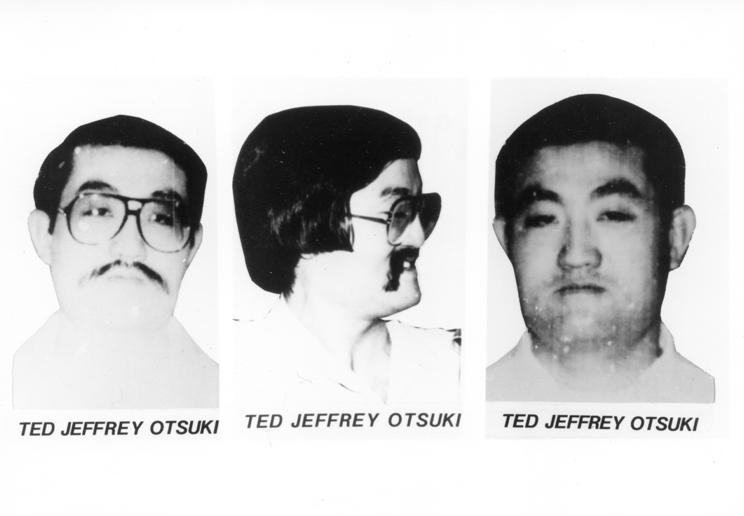

FBI Ten Most Wanted Fugitive
- Charges: murder of a Boston police officer

Description
- Born: Ted Jeffrey Otsuki; 1951 (age 74–75); Harlingen, Texas
- Nationality: American
- Race: Japanese

Status
- Penalty: life in prison with no parole
- Added: January 20, 1988
- Caught: September 4, 1988 (aged 36)
- Number: 415
- Captured

Ted Jeffrey Otsuki is an American criminal of Japanese descent from Harlingen, Texas and a former member of the FBI Ten Most Wanted Fugitives list who was added as number 415. Otsuki—who had served seven years in Leavenworth Prison, Kansas, for bank robbery—killed a Boston police officer, Roy Joseph Sergei (who died of his injuries 17 days later), and critically wounded another, Jorge Torres, after they encountered him in an alley (in the midst of responding to another unrelated domestic dispute dispatch) on October 9, 1987. At the time of the shooting, Otsuki was on parole.

== Disappearance and capture ==
Otsuki was wanted for the 1987 murder of a Boston, Massachusetts police officer and the shooting of another. He mistakenly thought they were chasing him from his home. A murder warrant was then issued for Otsuki's arrest and capture and he was then traced by the police to the city of San Francisco, California. Otsuki was captured in Jalisco, Guadalajara on September 4, 1988, by a combined squad of both Federal Bureau of Investigation (FBI) and Mexican Federal agents.

== Aftermath ==
Otsuki was found guilty of first degree murder and sentenced to life in prison plus 20 years without the possibility of parole.

== In popular culture ==
The manhunt for Otsuki was the subject of the episode 7 of the fifth series of the Discovery Channel's The FBI Files titled "Lawless".
