= Byron Chubbuck =

American bank robber

- Born: Byron Shane Chubbuck; February 26, 1967 (age 59); Albuquerque, New Mexico, U.S.
- Other names: Oso Blanco de Atzlán, Robin the Hood
- Escaped: December 21, 2000
- Escape end: February 6, 2001

Details
- Imprisoned at: United States Penitentiary, Atwater

Byron Shane Chubbuck (born February 26, 1967), also known Oso Blanco de Aztlán (Spanish for "White Bear of Atzlán") and popularly referred to as Robin the Hood is an American convicted bank robber. He has been officially charged with around 20 bank robberies, but Chubbuck himself puts the number closer to 50.

During his criminal run, he informed bank tellers that the money which he stole would go towards the indigenous Zapatista Army in Southern Mexico. After being charged with 13 counts of bank robbery and 1 count of attempted bank robbery, he was imprisoned at Santa Fe County Jail, where he remained until fleeing in December 2000. During this time, he was placed under the "15 most wanted" list of fugitives by the United States Marshal Service. In February 2001, he was captured again by FBI agents after a vehicle stakeout and car chase. After being caught, he was sentenced to 80 years of jail time with a release date of 2071. In 2016, 25 years were taken off his sentence when he won an appeal. Chubbuck is currently serving his sentence in the United States Penitentiary, Atwater in Atwater, California.

== Criminal career ==
Chubbuck started his criminal career at a young age, from having a rough home life. Starting in 1998, Chubbuck would rob numerous banks in New Mexico until he was captured on August 13, 1999, when multiple agents from the Federal Bureau of Investigation went to his residence in Albuquerque, where they interrogated his wife, who was unaware of Chubbuck's actions. Investigators tied the wife to the get away vehicle when a witness wrote down the license plate. It actually belonged to the wife's ex-husband who lived in a different state. During the interrogation, Chubbuck arrived home, where he and the agents participated in an intense shooting which fortunately resulted in no injuries. He escaped, but was found the same day hiding with family members at an adjacent apartment. After breaking through the walls of the apartment complex, he jumped out of a window in an escape attempt, but he was quickly captured and arrested, after a brief encounter with a k-9. On October 14, he pled guilty to 14 bank heists, for which he was sentenced to 40 years of prison time.

=== Escape ===
On December 21, 2000, Chubbuck unlocked his handcuffs and broke out of a prisoner transport van by kicking down the steel-meshed windows. He ran away from the guards, who were unable to chase after him to prevent the other prisoners in the van from escaping as well. After this, he coerced a man and woman into driving him to a nearby Wendy's restaurant. He briefly left the country to reside in Mexico, but returned to the United States to try and have his wife join him in Juarez, Mx.

In a call to KZRR-FM radio station on February 5, 2001, Chubbuck admitted to "robbing banks to help the Zapatistas in Chiapas, Mexico". Chubbuck said he would turn himself in on the conditions that an FBI agent admit that they were trying to kill him and for a jail guard to be arrested for abusing inmates, claiming that "he beats inmates, he gasses them, he leaves them chained". He also admitted to buying the key to free himself from his handcuffs from the guard. During his brief time in freedom, he robbed 8 more banks.

=== Recapture ===
On February 6, 2001, FBI agents staked outside of a trailer van where Chubbuck was hiding using an undercover mole. After Chubbuck was to make a car getaway. After a short chase, Chubbuck was shot in the chest and subsequently captured. After being transported to the University of New Mexico Hospital, Chubbuck recovered from all his injuries.

Although federal prosecutors tried having him incarcerated for life under a federal "three strikes" law, he was finally sentenced to 80 years of jail time. He has served his sentence in multiple facilities, including the Sandoval County Jail, the US Penitentiary in Leavenworth, Kansas, and the USP Atwater in Atwater, CA which is where he is currently imprisoned.
