= The FBI Files =

Television series

- Title card
- Created by: Tom Naughton
- Starring: James Kallstrom; Anthony Call; Susan Rae; Stephen Kemble
- Country of origin: United States
- No. of seasons: 7
- No. of episodes: 121 (List of episodes)

Production
- Running time: 49–51 minutes
- Production company: New Dominion Pictures

Original release
- Network: Discovery Channel
- Release: October 20, 1998 – March 24, 2006

The FBI Files is an American television docudrama series that originally ran from 1998 to 2006 on the Discovery Channel and produced by New Dominion Pictures. The show was cancelled in 2006. However, Court TV Mystery, Discovery, and its sister network, ID, aired re-runs until October 2012. Investigation Discovery only showed episodes from seasons 5,6, and 7. As of October 2012, the network now airs episodes from the earlier seasons (although not necessarily in chronological order), with updated information about the cases at the end of most episodes. Up to late September 2012, WE tv showed episodes from seasons 1-4, but the network had removed the episode introductions by Jim Kallstrom. In the UK on Quest Red, The FBI Files airs every weeknight. It has also been shown on TV Denmark, Discovery Australia, and Netflix in Canada.

More recently, New Dominion Pictures made all episodes of The FBI Files available on YouTube and all episodes can be watched on Hulu.

In June 2026, Radial Entertainment announced that the show would be revived with 20 episodes produced by Bright North Studios. The show is set to premiere on Radial's FAST channels on February 1, 2027.

== Synopsis ==
The show described actual FBI cases, with dramatic reenactments and interviews with agents and forensic scientists who worked in the investigations. The show premiered on October 20, 1998, and 120 episodes were executive produced by Tom Naughton before the final episode aired on March 24, 2006. The series covered the kidnapping and murder of Polly Klaas, the investigation and conviction of John Gotti, the Unabomber case, the World Trade Center Bombing, the Sara Tokars murder case, the several prison escapes by Christopher Jeburk, John Birges's biggest bomb in history (Harvey's Casino in Stateline, Nevada), The murder of Christina Long, and many other well-known and less well-known true crime stories. Unlike The New Detectives, a somewhat similar true crime show, The FBI Files centers on murders, narcotics, bank robberies, kidnappings, etc., where the FBI is called in to assist police departments.

== Hosts and narrators ==
James Kallstrom, a former head of the FBI's New York City office, hosted the show. Among other high-profile cases, he investigated the crash of TWA Flight 800. Allison Erkelens was head writer for the series production company, New Dominion Pictures, from 2000 to 2005.

Anthony Call, an actor known for roles on the daytime soap operas The Guiding Light and One Life to Live, co-hosted/narrated all the United States episodes and some international ones. Susan Rae and Stephen Kemble were the narrators on several international versions of the show.

Lucy Longhurst narrated the international version of the episodes "Murdering Cowboy" that was about the convicted felon Claude Dallas and "Deadly Paradise" about the "Sea Wind Murders" on Palmyra Atoll.

Peter Dickson narrated season 2 of the international version of the show. Among those were the episodes "A Model Killer" that was about the slain serial killer Christopher Wilder (aka- "The Beauty Queen Killer") and "Cat and Mouse" about the 1985 search for South Carolina's convicted serial killer Larry Gene Bell.

Among those Susan Rae did was "Dishonoured" about the 1989 disappearance of USMC Capt. Shirley Russell, and the joint FBI – NIS investigation of her husband, former USMC Capt. Robert Russell and "When Seconds Count" about when a 12-year-old girl was abducted from her home in Lodi, California.

Among those Stephen Kemble did was "The Price of Greed" about the 1997 Los Angeles Dunbar Armored robbery.

Among those international versions Anthony Call did was "Omega 7" about the Omega 7 group and "Dangerous Cause" about the Fuerzas Armadas de Liberación Nacional Puertorriqueña group.

Ben Ando also did some voice overs in the UK.

== Episodes ==
Season	Episodes	Season premiere	Season finale
1	13	October 20, 1998	February 23, 1999
2	18	September 28, 1999	May 30, 2000
3	18	September 12, 2000	September 18, 2001
4	18	October 2, 2001	May 2002
5	18	October 15, 2002	May 27, 2003
6	18	September 20, 2003	May 7, 2004
7	18	2005	March 24, 2006

== Home media ==
Timeless Media Group has released all seven seasons of The FBI Files on DVD in Region 1.

DVD Name	Ep#	Release dates		
DVD Name	Ep#	Region 1	Region 2	Region 4
The Complete First Season	13	January 6, 2009	NBA	April 7, 2011
The Complete Second Season	18	April 21, 2009	NBA	October 6, 2011
The Complete Third Season	18	June 19, 2009	NBA	2014
The Complete Fourth Season	18	September 15, 2009	NBA	August 21, 2015
The Complete Fifth Season	18	February 6, 2015	NBA	Unreleased
The Complete Sixth Season	18	February 6, 2015	NBA	Unreleased
The Complete Seventh Season	18	January 29, 2015	NBA	Unreleased

== See also ==
- Forensic Detectives
- The New Detectives
