= FBI Ten Most Wanted Fugitives, 1960s =

In the 1960s, for a second decade, the United States FBI continued to maintain a public list of the people it regarded as the Ten Most Wanted Fugitives. Following is a brief review of FBI people and events that place the 1960s decade in context, and then an historical list of individual suspects whose names first appeared on the 10 Most Wanted list during the decade of the 1960s, under FBI Director J. Edgar Hoover.

== FBI headlines in the 1960s ==
As a decade, the 1960s were the final and most controversial of the Hoover era in the Bureau. The famous Director had formed and defined the Bureau for nearly a half century. During the turbulent 1960s, the FBI continued controversial domestic surveillance in an operation called Cointelpro. It aimed at investigating and disrupting dissident political organizations within the United States, including civil rights leaders, such as Martin Luther King Jr. who was a frequent target of investigation.

As a more friendly face presented to the public, in 1965 Warner Bros. Television presented the series The F.B.I., showing dramatizations taken from actual historical FBI cases, starring Efrem Zimbalist, Jr. as fictional agent Louis Erskine. Epilogues included Zimbalist stepping out of character to alert viewers to Ten Most Wanted Fugitives from the FBI's contemporary list.

== FBI Ten Most Wanted Fugitives to begin the 1960s ==
The FBI in the past has identified individuals by the sequence number in which each individual has appeared on the list. Some individuals have even appeared twice, and often a sequence number was permanently assigned to an individual suspect who was soon caught, captured, or simply removed, before his or her appearance could be published on the publicly released list. In those cases, the public would see only gaps in the number sequence reported by the FBI. For convenient reference, the wanted suspect's sequence number and date of entry on the FBI list appear below, whenever possible.

As the new decade opened, six of the ten places on the list remained filled by these elusive long-time fugitives, then still at large:

Name	Sequence Number	Date of Entry	Notes
Frederick J. Tenuto	#14	1950	On March 9, 1964, federal process against Tenuto was dismissed in Philadelphia, Pennsylvania, by a U.S. District Judge and subsequently removed from the list.
James Eddie Diggs	#36	1952	On December 14, 1961, his charges were dismissed in Norfolk, Virginia and subsequently removed from the list.
David Daniel Keegan	#78	1954	On December 13, 1963, his charges were dismissed in Cedar Rapids, Iowa and subsequently removed from the list.
Eugene Francis Newman	#97	1956	On June 11, 1965, his charges dismissed in Buffalo, New York and subsequently removed from the list.
Angelo Luigi Pero	#107	1958	On December 2, 1960, his charges were dismissed by the U.S. Attorney in New York, New York and subsequently removed from the list.
Edwin Sanford Garrison	#112	1959	Arrested in St. Louis, Missouri on September 9, 1960. He was also #59 on the list.

== FBI Ten Most Wanted Fugitives added during the 1960s ==
The most wanted fugitives listed in the decade of the 1960s include (in FBI list appearance sequence order):

=== 1960 ===
Name	Sequence Number	Date of Entry	Time Listed
Kenneth Ray Lawson	#124	January 1, 1960	Two months
Kenneth Ray Lawson was serving time at Brushy Mountain State Penitentiary for robbing a grocery store when he incited a riot and escaped with four other inmates. He was arrested in Laredo, Texas on March 20, 1960, due to an FBI investigation.
Ted Jacob Rinehart	#125	January 25, 1960	Two months
Ted Jacob Rinehart was a longtime career criminal as an armed robber and jewel thief. He was arrested in Granada Hills, California, after a citizen recognized him from a Wanted Flyer in March, 1960. Rinehart told Agents he learned of his addition to the "Top Ten" list while watching a local television show.
Charles Clyatt Rogers	#126	March 18, 1960	Two months
Charles Clyatt Rogers was a convicted murderer, kidnapper, and rapist who escaped a mental hospital in Chattahoochee, Florida. He was arrested in Minneapolis, Minnesota, while standing in a soup line at a Salvation Army center in May, 1960. He was recognized by a police officer who collected FBI Wanted Posters.
Joseph Corbett, Jr.	#127	March 30, 1960	Seven months
Joseph Corbett, Jr. was wanted for the kidnapping and murder of Adolph Coors III, heir to the Coors Brewing Company. He was apprehended in Vancouver, British Columbia, by Canadian police after two Canadian citizens recognized Corbett from a November 1960 Reader's Digest article. Because Coors' remains were found within the state, he wasn't tried on federal kidnapping charges.
William Mason	#128	April 6, 1960	Three weeks
William Mason was wanted for murder. He had gotten into a knife and fist fight with two men and found them hours later to shoot them. He killed one and wounded the other before fleeing. He was arrested in Milwaukee, Wisconsin on April 27, 1960, due to an FBI investigation.
Edward Reiley	#129	May 10, 1960	Two weeks
Edward Reiley was wanted for robbing a bank of over $19,000, equivalent to $206,777.3 in 2025, and continued to rob others while on the run. He was arrested in Rockford, Illinois, by the local sheriff after an auto salesman recognized Reiley from a Wanted Flyer on May 24, 1960. Upon arrest, he pleaded, "Don't shoot! I'm the guy you want."
Harold Eugene Fields	#130	May 25, 1960	Four months
Harold Eugene Fields, a longtime criminal known for blowing open safes and shooting at police, was wanted for fleeing after he attempted to appeal a burglary charge while on parole. He was arrested in Schererville, Indiana on September 5, 1960. Fields told arresting FBI agents his place on the "Top Ten" list convinced him his days of freedom were numbered and his apprehension came as no surprise.
Richard Peter Wagner	#131	June 23, 1960	Two days
Richard Peter Wagner was wanted for escaping prison where he was serving time for committing multiple burglaries across 15 states. He was arrested in Minnesota on June 25, 1960, after a citizen recognized him from a newspaper article. An expert woodsman, Wagner had been a hunting and fishing guide at the lodge where he was captured.
James John Warjac	#132	July 19, 1960	Three days
James John Warjac, a.k.a. Dale Cline, was a mob hitman and was wanted for escaping prison. He was arrested in Los Angeles, California on July 22, 1960, due to an FBI investigation.
Ernest Tait	#133	August 16, 1960	One month
Ernest Tait was wanted for fleeing after being charged with burglary when he tried breaking into an Indiana bottling company's safe. He was arrested in Denver, Colorado on September 10, 1960, due to an FBI investigation. He was also #23 on the list.
Clarence Leon Raby	#134	August 19, 1960	Nine days
Clarence Leon Raby, along with another inmate, escaped prison while serving time for drunk driving. After the escape, he killed a local storekeeper after robbing a gas station. As the FBI closed in, he then took a couple hostage before robbing them of their guns, cash, and car. He surrendered to local authorities at his parents' home in Heiskell, Tennessee on August 28, 1960. However, while in custody, Raby's mother, sister, and girlfriend, Lula Mae Mashburn, smuggled him a gun and in his attempt to escape, shot a deputy. He was then shot and killed by the same deputy he had shot.
Nathaniel Beans	#135	September 12, 1960	Three weeks
Nathaniel Beans was wanted for the murder of a woman he was living with. He had a long history of assaults on women and was involved in three other shootings. He was arrested in Buffalo, New York on September 30, 1960, by a police officer who recognized him from a magazine photograph.
Stanley William Fitzgerald	#136	September 20, 1960	Two days
Stanley William Fitzgerald was wanted for murder. He had met two men at a bar in San Francisco, California and offered them a ride after overhearing them planning a trip to Reno, Nevada. The next day while driving, he pulled off the highway and robbed them at gunpoint. During the robbery, one of the men attacked Fitzgerald, leading him to shoot both men and kill one. He was arrested in Portland, Oregon on September 22, 1960, by the FBI after a citizen recognized him from a photograph in a newspaper.
Donald Leroy Payne	#137	October 6, 1960	Five years
Donald Leroy Payne, a convicted rapist and child molester, was wanted for posing as the manager of a dance troupe and raping an 18-year-old professional dancer. Federal process' against Payne was dismissed in Houston, Texas on November 26, 1965.
Charles Francis Higgins	#138	October 10, 1960	One week
Charles Francis Higgins, a longtime criminal, was wanted for escaping prison while serving a sentence for robbery. He had escaped various prisons, with a prior attempt where he cut the power to the prison entirely. He was arrested in Kirkwood, Missouri on October 17, 1960, by local police after an officer recognized him from a newspaper photograph.
Robert William Schultz, Jr.	#139	October 12, 1960	One month
Robert William Schultz, Jr. was wanted for escaping a Sandstone, Minnesota prison where he was serving eight years for an attempted bank robbery. He was arrested in Orlando, Florida on November 4, 1960, due to an FBI investigation.
Merle Lyle Gall	#140	October 17, 1960	Three months
Merle Lyle Gall was wanted for fleeing after being convicted with a 15-year sentence for burglary as a burglary gang leader. He was arrested in Scottsdale, Arizona on January 18, 1961, due to an FBI investigation.
James George Economou	#141	October 31, 1960	Five months
James George Economou was wanted for escaping prison when he started a fight with another inmate. He was serving time for narcotics and armed robbery of a grocery store. He was arrested in Los Angeles, California on March 22, 1961, after a tip from an informant.
Ray Delano Tate	#142	November 18, 1960	One week
Ray Delano Tate was the leader of a gang of bank robbers who robbed multiple banks on the east-coast. Their last robbery in New Jersey left an elderly bank guard dead when he was shot reaching for his gun. Tate surrendered to an editor of the New York Daily Mirror newspaper in New York, New York in November 1960, because he felt cornered by the vast publicity afforded by his fugitive status. He was taken into custody immediately by FBI agents.
John B. Everhart	#143	November 22, 1960	Three years
John B. Everhart was wanted for escaping prison where he was serving time for murder. He was arrested in San Francisco, California on November 6, 1963. He was taken into custody while painting a house.
Herbert Hoover Huffman	#144	December 19, 1960	Ten days
Herbert Hoover Huffman was wanted for torturing and murdering his wife. He had suspected her of cheating and wanted to "teach her a lesson", so he beat and burned her in a hotel room. He had a history of beating women, stabbing someone with an icepick, and threatening others with a gun. He was apprehended in Cleveland, Ohio on December 29, 1960, after a fellow worker recognized him from a Wanted Poster.
Kenneth Eugene Cindle	#145	December 23, 1960	Four months
Kenneth Eugene Cindle, a long time criminal, was wanted for armed robbery of a Wichita, Kansas restaurant with an accomplice. He was apprehended in Cochran County, Texas in April 1961, after a local farmer saw Cindle's photograph on television. The farmer had picked up a hitchhiker earlier that day and recognized him as Cindle. He had been hitchhiking across the county and working odd jobs to avoid apprehension.

=== 1961 ===
Name	Sequence Number	Date of Entry	Time Listed
Thomas Viola	#146	January 17, 1961	Two months
Thomas Viola was wanted for escaping prison where he was serving a life sentence for the murder of two men. He was known as a gangland executioner and trigger man for the local Mob. He was arrested in Detroit, Michigan on March 27, 1961, after a citizen recognized his photo in an article in American Weekly.
William Chester Cole	#147	February 2, 1961	Four days
William Chester Cole, a member of the "Mutt and Jeff" bandit team, was wanted for fleeing while awaiting sentencing for five armed robberies. He surrendered to FBI agents in Gulf Breeze, Florida on February 6, 1961. Cole said, "The 'heat' of the investigation was too much."
Willie Hughes	#148	March 15, 1961	Five months
Willie Hughes was wanted for beating and strangling to death his best friend. His friend had supported him after Hughes got out of prison for murder where he and two others beat a man to death with a pipe. He was arrested in Pocatello, Idaho on August 8, 1961, where he had been working as a farm laborer.
William Terry Nichols	#149	April 6, 1961	One year
William Terry Nichols, a longtime criminal since the age of 15, was wanted for escaping prison while serving time for robbery. A known prison escape artist, he orchestrated a breakout with three others where they overpowered a prison guard and stole his weapons. They then locked the guard and a gang foreman in a prison truck cage and hijacked it where seven convicts, who were not part of the breakout, were being transported. They then drove to a home six miles away, robbed a couple who lived there, forced them at gunpoint onto the truck, stole their car and fled. He was arrested near Homestead, Florida on April 30, 1962, where he had started a commercial fishing business.
George Martin Bradley, Jr.	#150	April 10, 1961	Three weeks
George Martin Bradley, Jr. was wanted for bank robbery. He was arrested in Davenport, Iowa on May 1, 1961, by local police officers after an attempted bank robbery where he told the president of the bank he had a stick of dynamite and a pistol. The president grabbed the bag and threw it into a corner causing Bradley to run. He was chased by a patron of the bank, but an officer got to him first. He was identified after routine fingerprinting.
Philip Alfred LaNormandin	#151	April 17, 1961	A few hours
Philip Alfred LaNormandin, described as a "trigger happy, three-fingered, trumpeter", was wanted for attempted robbery of a grocery store in Reading, Massachusetts where he had a shootout with police. He was arrested on April 17, 1961, in Jersey City, New Jersey, thanks to a tip from a citizen who saw his photograph in the newspaper a few hours after being placed on the list.
Kenneth Holleck Sharp	#152	May 1, 1961	Two months
Kenneth Holleck Sharp was wanted for shooting and killing a 75-year-old gas station attendant in Chicago, Illinois. He was arrested in Philadelphia, Pennsylvania on July 3, 1961, after a citizen recognized his photograph in the Master Detective magazine.
Anthony Vincent Fede	#153	May 22, 1961	Five months
Anthony Vincent Fede was wanted for robbing and kidnapping a tavern owner and was described as mentally unstable. He was arrested in Los Angeles, California on October 28, 1961. Captured by FBI agents, Fede was carrying a toy pistol and a fake police badge. He said, "I should have given myself up."
Richard Laurence Marquette	#154	June 29, 1961	One day
Richard Laurence Marquette was wanted for the gruesome murder of Joan Caudle in which parts of her body were wrapped in newspaper and scattered about southeast Portland, Oregon. He was the first "special addition" to the list, making the total eleven at the time. He was arrested in Santa Maria, California on June 30, 1961, by the FBI after a citizen recognized his photograph on a Wanted Flyer posted in a credit bureau. He would be released after twelve years on parole and would go on to kill two more women in a similar manner.
Robert William Schuette	#155	July 19, 1961	Two weeks
Robert William Schuette, a convicted armed robber, was wanted for escaping prison. He was arrested in Chicago, Illinois on August 2, 1961. He had shaved his sideburns and mustache and changed his address 40 times to avoid being recognized. He congratulated the FBI saying, "You fellows sure did a good job." In his pocket was a news clipping with a picture telling of his addition to the "Ten Most Wanted Fugitives" list two weeks prior.
Chester Anderson McGonigal	#156	August 14, 1961	Three days
Chester Anderson McGonigal was wanted for attempted murder of his wife when he slit her throat at a Colorado bar. He was arrested in Denver, Colorado on August 17, 1961, by the FBI after a citizen recognized his photograph in a newspaper.
Hugh Bion Morse	#157	August 29, 1961	Two months
Hugh Bion Morse was wanted for the murder of 27-year-old Bobbi Ann Landini, where he raped and beat her to death with a pipe. Afterwards he sexually assaulted her dead body. At the time, he was on the run for a series of burglaries and sex crimes from several other states. He was arrested in St. Paul, Minnesota on October 13, 1961, the evening after a visitor to the FBI Tour in Washington, D.C., recognized his photo displayed on the "Top Ten" Exhibit.
John Gibson Dillon	#158	September 1, 1961	Three years
John Gibson Dillon, a longtime criminal, was wanted for fleeing after he was convicted of being the leader of a narcotics ring. He was sentenced to 190 years on 11 convictions. He was found murdered in Chelsea, Oklahoma in 1964. His badly decomposed body was located at the bottom of a 15-foot, water-filled well on a remote farm. Wired to his body were 400 pounds of oil well drilling equipment.
John Robert Sawyer	#159	October 30, 1961	Four days
John Robert Sawyer was wanted for several bank robberies. In one of the robberies, he and another man beat a bank manager and brought him and his wife to the bank, forcing the manager to open the vault. He was arrested in Wickendale, Arizona on November 3, 1961, by a local police officer after he recognized Sawyer's vehicle in an All Points Bulletin issued by the FBI.
Edward Wayne Edwards	#160	November 10, 1961	Three months
Edward Wayne Edwards was wanted for fleeing after being convicted for a series of gas station robberies. He was arrested in Atlanta, Georgia on January 20, 1962, by local police. He would go on to murder at least five people between 1977 and 1996. He is also suspected of several other killings, but died of natural causes before he could be executed.
Franklin Eugene Alltop	#161	November 22, 1961	Three months
Franklin Eugene Alltop, a convicted robber, was wanted for escaping prison. He was arrested in Kansas City, Kansas on February 2, 1962, due to an FBI investigation. Alltop greeted the arresting FBI agents by saying, "I've been expecting you. I know you're the FBI."
Francis Laverne Brannan	#162	December 27, 1961	One month
Francis Laverne Brannan was wanted for shooting and killing a woman with a shotgun in Illinois. He surrendered to the FBI in Miami, Florida on January 17, 1962. Calling from a phone at a downtown gas station, Brannan told them, "Come and get me, I'm tired of running from the FBI." In February 1962, Brannan pleaded guilty to murder and was sentenced to 66 to 86 years in prison.

=== 1962 ===
Name	Sequence Number	Date of Entry	Time Listed
Delbert Henry Linaweaver	#163	January 30, 1962	One week
Delbert Henry Linaweaver was wanted for escaping custody while awaiting extradition to a state prison on robbery and forgery convictions. He got two other inmates to beat up a guard and deputy so he could flee. He was arrested in Floydada, Texas on February 5, 1962, by the FBI after a citizen recognized him from a Wanted Flyer in a post office.
Watson Young, Jr.	#164	February 5, 1962	One week
Watson Young, Jr. was wanted for escaping a mental hospital. He was an alleged rapist and double murderer. He was considered unpredictable and irrational with a deep interest in funeral homes. After a police chase, he was arrested in Salina, Kansas on February 12, 1962, driving a stolen funeral home ambulance. It had been stolen from an area funeral home. In his pocket, Young had his own Identification Order.
Lyndal Ray Smith	#165	February 14, 1962	One month
Lyndal Ray Smith was wanted for escaping prison where he was serving time for robbery. He and another inmate overpowered a guard in order to escape. He surrendered in Baltimore, Maryland on March 22, 1962, as a result of television and newspaper publicity.
Harry Robert Grove, Jr.	#166	February 19, 1962	One year
Harry Robert Grove, Jr., a longtime criminal in Ohio, was wanted for fleeing while awaiting trial for robbery of a meat market. He was arrested in Uhrichsville, Ohio on January 26, 1963, by the Ohio State Highway Patrol after being observed loitering in a supermarket.
Bobby Randell Wilcoxson	#167	February 23, 1962	Nine months
Bobby Randell Wilcoxson was wanted for robbing eight banks, the murder of a bank guard, and for setting off several bombs in Washington D.C. with his partner Albert Frederick Nussbaum (#168). He was considered the "brawns" to Nussbaum's "brains" of the duo. He was arrested in Baltimore, Maryland on November 10, 1962, due to an FBI investigation.
Albert Frederick Nussbaum	#168	April 2, 1962	Seven months
Albert Frederick Nussbaum was wanted for the robbing eight banks, the murder of a bank guard, and for setting off several bombs in Washington D.C. along with his partner Bobby Randell Wilcoxson (#167). He was considered the "brains" to Wilcoxson's "brawns" of the duo. He was arrested in Buffalo, New York on November 4, 1962, by the FBI after a 20-minute chase through downtown streets.
Thomas Welton Holland	#169	May 11, 1962	Three weeks
Thomas Welton Holland, a longtime criminal, was wanted for violating his parole from a 10-year sentence for armed robbery. He had also raped two boys at gunpoint, attempted to rape another boy, and made indecent proposals to two young girls. He was arrested in La Harpe, Kansas on June 2, 1962, by a police officer who recognized him from a Wanted Flyer.
Edward Howard Maps	#170	June 15, 1962	Five years
Edward Howard Maps was wanted as the lead suspect for the murder of his wife and setting his house on fire, leaving his 4-month-old daughter to die inside. Federal process against Maps was dismissed in Scranton, Pennsylvania In 1967.
David Stanley Jacubanis	#171	November 21, 1962	Eight days
David Stanley Jacubanis was wanted for robbing a bank. He was on parole for robbing several other banks at the time. He was arrested in Arlington, Virginia on November 29, 1962, due to an FBI investigation.
John Kinchloe DeJarnette	#172	November 30, 1962	Four days
John Kinchloe DeJarnette was wanted for bank robbery. He was arrested in Hollywood, California on December 3, 1962, due to an FBI investigation.
Michael Joseph O'Connor	#173	December 13, 1962	Fifteen days
Michael Joseph O'Connor, a.k.a. "Moon Mullins", was wanted for shooting and killing a tavern owner and theft. He was arrested by FBI agents in a restaurant in New York, New York on December 28, 1962. He had been hiding out in a New York hotel.
John Lee Taylor	#174	December 14, 1962	Six days
John Lee Taylor was wanted for the rape and burglary of an Illinois schoolteacher. He was arrested in Chicago, Illinois on December 20, 1962, due to an FBI investigation. He was sentenced to 25 – 50 years for rape and 15 – 40 years for burglary.

=== 1963 ===
Name	Sequence Number	Date of Entry	Time Listed
Harold Thomas O'Brien	#175	January 4, 1963	Two years
Harold Thomas O'Brien was wanted for shooting and killing a patron at the bar he was drinking at for no apparent reason. He killed the man with three shots from a second concealed gun he had which he gave the barkeeper for safekeeping. He was described to have a wild temper. In 1963, Federal Process against O'Brien was dismissed by federal and local authorities in Lake City, Illinois.
Jerry Clarence Rush	#176	January 14, 1963	Two months
Jerry Clarence Rush was wanted for escaping a Maryland State Penitentiary, where he was serving time for assault with intent to murder and bank robbery. Following his escape, he met and married a stripper. Using the money from the bank robbery, he went on a cross-country spending spree for his honeymoon. He was arrested on March 25, 1963, in Bay Harbor Islands, Florida as he attempted to enter a brand new car parked outside of his apartment. The surprised fugitive commented to the arresting agents, "I knew the FBI would find me, but I didn't think you guys would do it so soon." Convicted of bank robbery, Rush received a 29-year sentence.
Marshall Frank Chrisman	#177	February 7, 1963	Three months
Marshall Frank Chrisman, a long time criminal, was wanted for bank robbery. The FBI described him as a loudmouth, heavy drinker with a violent temper who liked to gamble. He was arrested by local police in Los Angeles, California in May 1963. He was apprehended after robbing a grocery store and was identified after a routine fingerprint check.
Howard Jay Barnard	#178	April 12, 1963	One year
Howard Jay Barnard was arrested by local police in North Sacramento, California in April 1964, after robbing a motel of $1,000. At the time of his apprehension, Barnard was wearing two sets of clothes, actor's makeup, and gold hair. He had cotton stuffed in his nose and mouth to disguise his face. Officers had to remove glue from his hands so he could be fingerprinted. He was considered a Houdini-like escape expert since he had escaped custody multiple times prior.
Leroy Ambrosia Frazier	#179	June 4, 1963	Three months
Leroy Ambrosia Frazier was wanted for escaping a mental hospital. He was described as "an extremely dangerous and mentally unbalanced schizophrenic escapee from a mental institution". He was arrested by FBI and local police in Cleveland, Ohio on September 12, 1963, after a citizen recognized Frazier from media coverage.
Carl Close	#180	September 25, 1963	One day
Carl Close was wanted for robbing a bank alongside his brother. He was apprehended in Anderson, South Carolina, by local authorities after robbing a bank on September 26, 1963.
Thomas Asbury Hadder	#181	October 9, 1963	Three months
Thomas Asbury Hadder was wanted after escaping a mental hospital where he was serving time for murdering a Maryland police officer. He was arrested in Oklahoma City, Oklahoma, by FBI agents on January 13, 1964, shortly after he registered at the Salvation Army Center under a fictitious name.
Alfred Oponowicz	#182	November 27, 1963	One year
Alfred Oponowicz was wanted for escaping custody after being arrested for bank robbery. He was also wanted in connection to the beating and murder of a Pittsburgh pinball machine distributor. He was arrested in Painesville, Ohio in December 1964, by FBI agents and local authorities. Captured in a railroad switching yard, he attempted to evade detection by lying completely submerged in a pool of water while breathing through a reed.
Arthur William Couts	#183	December 27, 1963	One month
Arthur William Couts was wanted for armed robbery when he held up a convenience store at gunpoint with an accomplice. He was arrested on January 30, 1964, in Philadelphia, Pennsylvania, by FBI agents due to an FBI investigation. Attempting to disguise his appearance, Couts had grown a heavy mustache and dyed his hair.

=== 1964 ===
Name	Sequence Number	Date of Entry	Time Listed
Jesse James Gilbert	#184	January 27, 1964	One month
Jesse James Gilbert was wanted for bank robbery and murder after he and an accomplice robbed a bank, then got into a shootout with police that left an officer dead in Alhambra, California. He was arrested in Philadelphia, Pennsylvania, by FBI agents on February 26, 1964. In order to hide his identity, he was wearing a wig, had on dark glasses, and had placed bandages over a tattoo on his left arm. After being apprehended by the agents, Gilbert remarked, "You men are real gentlemen, and if I had to be picked up, I'm glad it was by the FBI."
Sammie Earl Ammons	#185	February 10, 1964	Three months
Sammie Earl Ammons was wanted for check forgery and in connection with the deaths of two infants who were strangled and their mother was traveling with him and his wife. He was arrested in Cherokee, Alabama by local police on May 15, 1964, after attempting to pass a bad check in a Rome, Georgia store. A high-speed chase followed as local authorities pursued Ammons across the state line.
Frank B. Dumont	#186	March 10, 1964	One month
Frank B. Dumont was wanted for aggravated assault of a 14-year-old girl. He beat her unconscious with his fists before placing her in his car. A passing car noticed the attack and followed him, prompting him to throw the girl out of his moving car. He was also suspected of being involved in the murder of a 16-year-old girl the year prior. He was arrested in Tucson, Arizona by local police on April 27, 1964, after committing a burglary in an apartment building.
William Beverly Hughes	#187	March 18, 1964	One month
William Beverly Hughes was wanted for escaping prison where he was serving a term for armed robbery. He was arrested in Bylas, Arizona on April 11, 1964, by the Arizona Highway Patrol after a citizen recognized him from a description reported in a newspaper article.
Quay Cleon Kilburn	#188	March 23, 1964	Three months
Quay Cleon Kilburn was wanted for escaping a Utah state prison where he was serving time for bank robbery and auto theft. By using his press card as editor of the prison newspaper, he talked his way out. He was arrested in Ogden, Utah on June 25, 1964, due to an FBI investigation. He was also #105 on the list.
Joseph Francis Bryan, Jr.	#189	April 14, 1964	Two weeks
Joseph Francis Bryan, Jr. was wanted for the kidnapping and murders of two young boys in South Carolina and Florida after escaping a mental hospital. He was a known pedophile who had been recently in jail for burglary and auto theft, as well as, tying two boys to a tree and molesting them. He was arrested in New Orleans, Louisiana on April 28, 1964. While Bryan was driving a stolen 1963 Cadillac, he was spotted by a lone FBI agent as he walked out with a child he had recently kidnapped from Humboldt, Tennessee. The agent flagged down a second agent and the two agents followed Bryan into a nearby shopping center where they arrested him.
John Robert Bailey	#190	April 22, 1964	Two weeks
John Robert Bailey, a longtime criminal with convictions of rape, robbery, carnal abuse, and larceny, was wanted for armed robbery of a hotel in Hot Spring, Arkansas along with three others. He was arrested in Hayward, California on May 4, 1964, where he had posed as a plumber for two years.
George Zavada	#191	May 6, 1964	One month
George Zavada, a longtime criminal, was wanted for robbing several banks, one of which he forced a bank manager to clean out the teller cages with what appeared to be sticks of dynamite and a gun. He reportedly called himself "The King" and had this monogram on his car, wallet, and underwear. J. Edgar Hoover would later go on to say he was obsessed with robbing banks and it was rumored he was anxious to kill FBI agents who came to arrest him. He was arrested in San Jose, California on June 12, 1964, after a shootout where he was shot in the chest and rushed to a hospital in Santa Clara, California, to undergo surgery. He would later die of a heart attack at 49 in Leavenworth Federal Penitentiary.
George Patrick McLaughlin	#192	May 8, 1964	Nine months
George Patrick McLaughlin was wanted for the murder of a bank teller at a christening party. He was also a member of the Charleston Mob and the cause of the Irish Mob Wars in Charleston, Massachusetts because he made a pass at a rival gang leader's girlfriend. He was arrested in Dorchester, Massachusetts due to an FBI investigation, in his third-floor apartment on February 24, 1965.
Chester Collins	#193	May 14, 1964	Three years
Chester Collins was wanted for escaping prison in Fort Pierce, Florida where he was serving time for assaulting a woman with a hatchet. In 1967, Federal Process against Collins was dismissed in West Palm Beach, Florida, at the request of local authorities.
Edward Newton Nivens	#194	May 28, 1964	Five days
Edward Newton Nivens was wanted for robbing a bartender and shooting a bar patron. He was arrested when a citizen saw a wanted flyer for Nivens and tipped authorities to his whereabouts in June 1964. Agents quickly captured him at his truck driving job.
Louis Frederick Vasselli	#195	June 15, 1964	Three months
Louis Frederick Vasselli, a known drug dealer and drug addict, was wanted for bail jumping after he failed to appear in court for narcotic charges. He had several other ongoing cases, one of which was being part of a burglary ring that robbed wealthy neighborhood homes. In July 1959, he was charged with shooting his sister's husband and his brother-in-law, but was later acquitted. He was arrested in Calumet City, Illinois on September 1, 1964, by the FBI after an old schoolmate recognized him from a Wanted Flyer.
Thomas Edward Galloway	#196	June 24, 1964	One month
Thomas Edward Galloway was wanted for the murder of a mobster and bail jumping. The FBI described him as "a luxury-loving pimp with an IQ of about 124" with a string of nine wives. He was arrested at a golf course in Danville, Virginia on July 17, 1964, by the FBI after a citizen recognized him from a newspaper article.
Alson Thomas Wahrlich	#197	July 9, 1964	Three years
Alson Thomas Wahrlich was wanted for kidnapping, beating, choking, and molesting a 6-year-old girl in Tuscan, Arizona. He was arrested in Treasure Island, Florida on October 28, 1967, after a citizen recognized him from his description in Argosy magazine. In 1968, Wahrlich was convicted of kidnapping and sentenced to 30 to 50 years in prison.
Kenneth Malcolm Christiansen	#198	July 27, 1964	Two months
Kenneth Malcolm Christiansen was wanted for escaping prison. After escaping, he continued to hold up local businesses, being a suspect in at least 11 robberies. He was arrested in Silver Spring, Maryland on September 8, 1964, by local authorities after attempting to rob a seafood restaurant.
William Hutton Coble	#199	September 11, 1964	Six months
William Hutton Coble, a longtime criminal, was wanted for escaping a Nashville, Tennessee jail by jumping out a broken window. He was facing a conviction of bank robbery and was considered an accomplished escape artist, as he had escaped multiple times awaiting trial. He was arrested in Charlotte, North Carolina on March 1, 1965, by Charlotte police after an unsuccessful attempt to rob a bank. He would later die in prison the same year.
Lloyd Donald Greeson, Jr.	#200	September 18, 1964	One week
Lloyd Donald Greeson, Jr. was wanted for larceny, grand larceny, and auto theft, but was also wanted in the connection of two women's deaths. One in Miami, Florida where a woman was found to have overdosed involuntarily who was last seen with Greeson, and one in Wilkes-Barre, Pennsylvania, where a woman was found dead in a ditch, also last seen with Greeson at a local bar. He was arrested in Elsinore, California on September 23, 1964, by the Chief of Police after a citizen recognized him from a photograph on his Wanted Flyer. On October 30, 1964, Greeson pleaded guilty to second degree murder for the poisoning of Lola Cotton in Florida. On November 3, he was sentenced to 20 years in prison.
Raymond Lawrence Wyngaard	#201	October 5, 1964	One month
Raymond Lawrence Wyngaard, a longtime criminal, was wanted for escaping custody in Detroit, Michigan while on his way to court for robbery charges. After his escape, he went on a crime spree with an accomplice where they robbed a gun shop and supermarket, shot a Detroit police officer, robbed 10 occupants of an office building, stole three cars, and abducted two motorists. He was arrested in a taxi cab in downtown Madison, Wisconsin on November 28, 1964, due to an FBI investigation.
Norman Belyea Gorham	#202	December 10, 1964	Five months
Norman Belyea Gorham, a longtime criminal, was wanted for bank robbery. He was arrested in Los Angeles California on May 28, 1965, after a citizen recognized him from a television announcement.

=== 1965 ===
Name	Sequence Number	Date of Entry	Time Listed
John William Clouser	#203	January 7, 1965	Seven years
John William Clouser, a.k.a. The Florida Fox, was a corrupt Orlando, Florida police detective who was on the run for nine years, the longest fugitive on the list at the time, after escaping a Florida prison where he was serving 30 years for robbery. In 1972, federal process against Clouser was dismissed in Montgomery, Alabama. However, he turned himself in on August 21, 1974.
Walter Lee Parman	#204	January 15, 1965	Two weeks
Walter Lee Parman was wanted for escaping custody while serving time for the murder of a Washington D.C., State Department secretary. He was sentenced to 20 years. However, he was considered a very smart person with extensive knowledge on crime. Therefore, he was allowed to speak at a George Washington University seminar in 1972. However, the speaking engagement was fake. The guard watching over Parman allowed him to go get a parking permit alone, giving Parman the opportunity to walk away and go on the run for 12 years. He lived under multiple aliases and worked a high paying job in Silicon Valley before he was recognized at an electronics convention. He was eventually arrested by U.S. Marshals. He was arrested in Los Angeles, California on January 31, 1965, after a citizen recognized him from a newspaper article. He received 5 years for escaping and served the remainder of his original sentence.
Gene Thomas Webb	#205	February 11, 1965	One day
Gene Thomas Webb was wanted for robbing a Chicago jewelry store o $10,000 where he and his two accomplices shot a police officer during the getaway. He was arrested in Chicago, Illinois on February 12, 1965, after he was recognized by FBI agents as he walked along a road in Colonial Village.
Samuel Jefferson Veney	#206	February 25, 1965	Three weeks
Samuel Jefferson Veney was wanted for a crime spree that started on the Christmas Eve of 1964 where he and his brother, Earl Veney (#207), committed an armed robbery of a liquor store, shot a police lieutenant who came to investigate, and then shot and killed a police sergeant who came to investigate the first shooting. He was arrested in Garden City, New York on March 11, 1965, with his brother, by the FBI and Federal Narcotics agents. Both men were working as machine operators in a manufacturing plant. A citizen cooperating with Federal Narcotics recognized Veney. Samuel and Earl were the first brother team added to the list. Samuel was charged with capital murder and armed robbery and was sentenced to life in prison.
Earl Veney	#207	March 5, 1965	One week
Earl Veney was wanted for a crime spree that started on Christmas Eve of 1964 where he and his brother, Samuel Jefferson Veney (#206), robbed a liquor store, shot a police lieutenant who came to investigate, then shot and killed a police sergeant who came to investigate the shooting. He was arrested in Garden City, New York on March 11, 1965, with his brother, by the FBI and Federal Narcotics agents. Both men were working as machine operators in a manufacturing plant. A citizen cooperating with Federal Narcotics recognized Veney. He was charged with attempted murder and armed robbery. He was sentenced to 30 years in prison but hanged himself in his cell in 1976.
Donald Stewart Heien	#208	March 11, 1965	One year
Donald Stewart Heien was wanted for escaping prison where he was serving time for murder. He had murdered a gas station attendant in Los Angeles. He was arrested in Newton, Massachusetts on February 3, 1966, by the FBI after a citizen recognized him from media coverage.
Arthur Pierce, Jr.	#209	March 24, 1965	One day
Arthur Pierce, Jr. was wanted for the sexual assaults and strangulation murders of a mother and daughter in Indianapolis, Indiana. He was arrested in Spring Valley, New York on March 25, 1965, after a citizen recognized him from a newspaper article. He had been working as a painting contractor.
Donald Dean Rainey	#210	March 26, 1965	Three month
Donald Dean Rainey was wanted for robbing a Fresno bank with his 16-year-old son. He was arrested in Nogales, Arizona on June 22, 1965, due to an FBI investigation.
Leslie Douglas Ashley	#211	April 6, 1965	Two weeks
Leslie Elaine Perez, born Leslie Douglas Ashley, was arrested for the murder of a Houston real estate agent when she and a partner shot him and burned his body in 1963. She was sentenced to death by electric chair, but was declared insane and sent to a psychiatric hospital in San Antonio, Texas. She escaped the hospital and was on the run until her eventual arrest in Atlanta, Georgia on April 23, 1965. Perez was working in a carnival side show as Bobo the Clown when she was caught.
Charles Bryan Harris	#212	May 6, 1965	One month
Charles Bryan Harris, a longtime criminal and bootlegging gangster, was wanted for murdering his crush and her male friend. This was mostly due to a feud he had with the Shelton Brothers Gang of which the two were a part of and Harris was a former member. He was apprehended near Fairchild, Illinois living in an old farm house. He was sentenced to 16 years in prison for the murders and would die in 1988.
William Albert Autur Tahl	#213	June 10, 1965	Five months
William Albert Autur Tahl was wanted after he drunkenly shot and killed his two employers with a shotgun after demanding money and a place to sleep. He then stole their car, and raped an 18-year-old woman on his way out of town. Later, he fled to Dallas, Texas, where he stabbed his new roommate in the heart and mutilated his corpse. After fleeing to St. Louis, Missouri, he became roommates with a schoolteacher. He would later beat and tie him to a bed. However, he was able to escape and call the police. Tahl was arrested in St. Louis, Missouri on November 5, 1965, by local authorities, but not before pointing a gun at his own chest and was talked down from attempting suicide. He would be sentenced to death before it was overturned on appeal, then went to trial only for it to end in a hung jury, then received life in prison. He served 12 years before being released on parole.
Duane Earl Pope	#214	June 11, 1965	One day
Duane Earl Pope was wanted for robbing a Farmers State bank in Big Springs, Nebraska where he shot four people, execution style, in the neck, murdering three and paralyzing one. He surrendered to local police in Kansas City, Missouri shortly after he was added to the "Top Ten" list on June 11, 1965. Pope was sentenced to death in federal court and state court. His federal death sentence was commuted to life in prison in 1968 and his state death sentence was commuted to life in prison in 1972 as a result of Furman v. Georgia.
Allen Wade Haugsted	#215	June 24, 1965	Six months
Allen Wade Haugsted was wanted for the murder of his wife and mother-in-law. He was arrested in Houston, Texas on December 23, 1965, after a citizen recognized him from a photo in the Houston Chronicle newspaper. He was working as a baker in a suburban shopping center.
Theodore Matthew Brechtel	#216	June 30, 1965	Two months
Theodore Matthew Brechtel, a convicted armed robber, was wanted for escaping custody by jumping out of a second floor window while on parole. He was arrested in Chicago, Illinois on August 16, 1965, at his place of employment where he was working as a painter. Although he had been using an alias, he admitted his true identity to arresting agents stating, "I know what you want; I'm it."
Robert Allen Woodford	#217	July 2, 1965	One month
Robert Allen Woodford, a convicted armed robber, was wanted after he was released from prison because of an administrative mistake. He was arrested in Seattle, Washington on August 5, 1965, by the FBI after a citizen recognized him from a Wanted Flyer.
Warren Cleveland Osborne	#218	August 12, 1965	One month
Warren Cleveland Osborne was wanted for killing a beauty salon owner who was attempting to stop him from shooting his estranged wife. He was killed in an automobile wreck near Mount Washington, Kentucky in September 1965, after a high speed chase with local police. He was positively identified through fingerprints.
Holice Paul Black	#219	August 25, 1965	Four months
Holice Paul Black was wanted alongside his brother for armed an robbery of a grocery store where they shot and killed a Chicago police sergeant who responded to the robbery. He was arrested in Miami, Florida on December 15, 1965, due to an FBI investigation. He would receive a sentence of 100 – 200 years for the murder, plus 20 – 40 years for the armed robbery.
Edward Owen Watkins	#220	September 21, 1965	One year
Edward Owen Watkins, a.k.a. "Fast Eddie", was a longtime bank robber and was wanted for robbing five banks in the Cleveland area. He was arrested in Florence, Montana on December 2, 1966. FBI agents displayed photos of Watkins to stores selling western clothing and a salesman recognized him. He would later die of possible heart or lung disease in 2002.
Joel Singer	#221	November 19, 1965	Two weeks
Joel Singer was wanted for a brazen robbery of the Brinks headquarters in Syracuse, New York in 1965. He and five to six others, cased the building, then over the course of the night of October 23, broke into the garage and drove a DeSoto station wagon which carried parts to make a 20mm, 1939 Russian-Finnish War, anti-tank cannon; they then set it up behind some old mattresses and blankets, before putting a homemade silencer on the barrel, and shooting it 31 times to make a hole into a vault wall. They made off with $430,000 (equivalent to $4,151,946 in 2025). He was apprehended in Montreal, Quebec, Canada by Montreal police on December 1, 1965. He had been the object of an intensive joint investigation by the FBI and Canadian authorities. He committed suicide in 1973 after possibly suffering from PTSD from the Attica Prison Riots.
James Edward Kennedy	#222	December 8, 1965	Two weeks
James Edward Kennedy was wanted for escaping prison where he was serving time for bank robbery. He was arrested in Worcester, Massachusetts on December 23, 1965, after a citizen recognized him from a newspaper article.
Lawrence John Higgins	#223	December 14, 1965	Two weeks
Lawrence John Higgins, a longtime criminal, was wanted for robbing a California bank. He had just been released from prison two weeks prior for robbing a bank. He was arrested in Emigrant Gap, California on January 3, 1966, by California Highway Patrol Officers.

=== 1966 ===
Name	Sequence Number	Date of Entry	Time Listed
Hoyt Bud Cobb	#224	January 6, 1966	Five months
Hoyt Bud Cobb was wanted for escaping prison with an accomplice. He was serving a life sentence for the brutal beating and murder of a gas station operator in Georgia. At that time of the murder, he had escaped jail on larceny charges. He was arrested in Hialeah, Florida in June 1966 by the FBI after a citizen recognized him from a Front Page Detective magazine article.
James Robert Bishop	#225	January 10, 1966	Two weeks
James Robert Bishop was wanted for the armed robbery of a grocery store manager. He was arrested in Aspen, Colorado on January 21, 1966, by the FBI after a citizen recognized him from an Identification Order. He had been working as a kitchen helper.
Robert Van Lewing	#226	January 12, 1966	Three weeks
Robert Van Lewing was wanted for multiple bank robberies. He was arrested in Kansas City, Missouri on February 6, 1967, by the FBI after a citizen recognized him in a feature story in This Week magazine.
Earl Ellery Wright	#227	January 14, 1966	Five months
Earl Ellery Wright, a longtime criminal, was wanted for multiple bank robberies. He was also charged with the theft of cash, candy, musical instruments, and accessories from an interstate shipment. He was arrested in Cleveland, Ohio on June 20, 1966, due to an FBI investigation. He surrendered after a 22-hour siege on a bank he was robbing where he took six hostages.
Jessie James Roberts, Jr.	#228	February 3, 1966	Five days
Jessie James Roberts, Jr. was wanted for a bank robbery spree in Georgia and Oklahoma. At the time, he was out on bond, awaiting appeal on a burglary charge. He was arrested in Laredo, Texas on February 8, 1966, due to an FBI investigation.
Charles Lorin Gove	#229	February 16, 1966	One day
Charles Lorin Gove was wanted for escaping a prison medical facility alongside Ralph Dwayn Owen (#230) while serving five years for armed robbery. During the escape they cut through metal bars on a window and cut through three chain link fences before overpowering two deputies and stealing their jeep. They then robbed a ranch, holding five people hostage, then robbed a bank. He was arrested on Bourbon Street in the French Quarter of New Orleans, Louisiana on February 16, 1966. The first dual listing alongside Owen.
Ralph Dwayne Owen	#230	February 16, 1966	One month
Ralph Dwayne Owen, who robbed banks dressed as a woman, was wanted for escaping a prison medical facility alongside Charles Lorin Gove (#229) while serving five years for armed robbery. During the escape they cut through metal bars on a window and cut through three chain link fences before overpowering two deputies and stealing their jeep. They then robbed a ranch, holding five people hostage, then robbed a bank. They split up and he got married a week before his arrest. He was arrested in Kansas City, Missouri on March 11, 1966, due to an FBI investigation. The first dual listing alongside Gove.
Jimmy Lewis Parker	#231	February 25, 1966	Two weeks
Jimmy Lewis Parker was wanted for escaping custody while serving a life sentence plus 25 years for murdering his estranged wife's parents and kidnapping a family of four. He escaped a prison bus by sawing through the bars on the window as he was being transferred. He was arrested in Detroit, Michigan on March 4, 1966, due to an FBI investigation.
Jack Daniel Sayadoff	#232	March 17, 1966	One week
Jack Daniel Sayadoff, a convicted bank robber, was wanted for multiple bank robberies and kidnapping a three-year-old girl with a female accomplice where they bound and gagged an elderly babysitter. He was arrested in Indianapolis, Indiana on March 24, 1966, due to an FBI investigation.
Robert Clayton Buick	#233	March 24, 1966	Five days
Robert Clayton Buick was wanted for robbing three banks in San Diego County and 19 banks in Los Angeles County. He would rob the banks with a chrome plated gun and was described as cool cut and well dressed. He was almost arrested during his last robbery, but bit the person holding him on the hand and escaped. He was arrested in Pecos, Texas on March 29, 1966, by a police officer who recognized him from a Wanted Poster. He would be sentenced to 20 years and published several books about the assassination of John F. Kennedy.
James Vernon Taylor	#234	April 4, 1966	One day
James Vernon Taylor, a longtime criminal and former mental patient, was wanted for beating and killing his wife and three children, one of whom was only 18-months-old. He was found dead in Baltimore, Maryland by Baltimore Harbor Police In April 1966.
Lynwood Irwin Mears	#235	April 11, 1966	One year
Lynwood Irwin Mears was wanted for escaping prison where he was serving time for breaking and entering. He was arrested in Winston-Salem, North Carolina on May 2, 1967, by the FBI after a citizen recognized him from an article in the Twin City Sentinel newspaper.
James Robert Ringrose	#236	April 15, 1966	One year
James Robert Ringrose was wanted for check fraud. He was apprehended in Osaka, Japan on March 29, 1967, by Japanese police while attempting to pass bad checks. He was arrested in Hawaii after his return to the United States from Japan. He told the FBI agents he had been saving an item for several years and now he needed it. He then presented them with the Monopoly, "Get out of jail free" card. After serving a couple of years in prison, he moved to Oregon and became obsessed with "wave power". He developed buoys and put them in the ocean. Then on November 10, 1979, he went out in a handmade, 15 foot, yellow submarine to look for one that went adrift and disappeared. Three weeks later he was found 35 miles off the coast of Washington with a 7-year-old girl. The girl was the daughter of Ringrose's business partner who was reported missing. No charges were filed. However, in 1984, the same girl, now 11, and another 11-year-old girl disappeared and were found at a motel room. They stated to investigators that Ringrose told them he was going to take them to Hawaii, but they needed to dye their hair first. Eventually he was captured in San Diego and charged with kidnapping and 13 other charges involving children. He was sentenced to two years.
Walter Leonard Lesczynski	#237	June 16, 1966	Three months
Walter Leonard Lesczynski, a long time criminal and robber, escaped custody by breaking out of a hospital after being shot seven times when he got into a shootout with police. He was arrested in Chicago, Illinois on September 9, 1966, due to an FBI investigation.
Donald Rogers Smelley	#238	June 30, 1966	Five months
Donald Rogers Smelley was wanted for fleeing after he was arrested for armed robbery. He held the same shop at gun point twice in a month, shooting at a clerk during the second robbery. He was arrested in Hollywood, California on November 7, 1966, due to an FBI investigation.
George Ben Edmonson	#239	September 21, 1966	Nine months
George Ben Edmonson was wanted for escaping a Missouri prison where he was serving 10 years for armed robbery. He then fled to Canada where he took on the name Alex Boremann, naming himself after Martin Bormann, the secretary to Adolf Hitler, as a reminder to himself not to be recaptured. He was arrested in Campbells Bay, Quebec, Canada On June 28, 1967, by the Royal Canadian Mounted Police after a Canadian citizen recognized him from an American magazine article.
Everett Leroy Biggs	#240	November 21, 1966	Two weeks
Everett Leroy Biggs was wanted for multiple armed robberies of stores and banks across multiple states. He was arrested in Broomfield, Colorado on December 1, 1966, due to an FBI investigation.
Gene Robert Jennings	#241	December 15, 1966	Two months
Gene Robert Jennings, a convicted robber, kidnapper, and a notorious prison escape artist, escaped a Kentucky prison multiple times while serving a life sentence for armed robbery. He was arrested in Atlantic City, New Jersey on February 14, 1967, by the FBI after a citizen recognized him from an article in "The Week" magazine.
Clarence Wilbert McFarland	#242	December 22, 1966	Four months
Clarence Wilbert McFarland, a longtime criminal since the age of 14, was wanted for escaping custody when he was being held on armed robbery of a bank. He was arrested in Baltimore, Maryland on April 4, 1967, by Baltimore Police as a burglary suspect. He was identified from his fingerprints.

=== 1967 ===
Name	Sequence Number	Date of Entry	Time Listed
Monroe Hickson	#243	February 17, 1967	One year
Monroe Hickson was wanted for escaping the Manning Correctional Facility where he was serving time for several violent assaults and four murders. He was found dead in Chapel Hill, North Carolina. A couple recognized Hickson's photograph in a "Top Ten" display and identified him as a migrant worker who had died of natural causes. Positive identification was made by fingerprints in 1968.
Clyde Edward Laws	#244	February 28, 1967	Three months
Clyde Edward Laws was wanted alongside Thomas Franklin Dorman (#247) after they robbed a Maryland supermarket. When leaving, they got into a gunfight with police where Laws shot an officer. They then carjacked and kidnapped a soldier. While on the run, he would frequently contact relatives and former employees to engage in small talk, but never gave an indication of his location. He was arrested in Raytown, Missouri on May 18, 1967, through cooperation of a relative. Upon his arrest, Laws commented "The one time I need my gun, I don't have it". He was tried for kidnapping in Maryland and on May 9, 1968, he was found guilty, receiving a 20-year sentence.
Charles Edward Ervin	#245	April 13, 1967	Three months
Charles Edwin Ervin was wanted for escaping prison while serving a 50-year sentence for armed robbery of a grocery store, along with his brother, Gordon Dale Ervin (#246). He was arrested in Hawkesbury, Ontario, Canada on July 25, 1967, by the Royal Canadian Mounted Police nearly two years before his brother. Charles Ervin sported facial scars indicative of plastic surgery.
Gordon Dale Ervin	#246	April 13, 1967	Two years
Gordon Dale Ervin was wanted for escaping prison while serving a 50-year sentence for armed robbery of a grocery store, along with his brother, Charles Edward Ervin (#245). He was arrested in Winnipeg, Canada on June 7, 1969, by the Royal Canadian Mounted Police nearly two years after his brother.
Thomas Franklin Dorman	#247	April 20, 1967	One month
Thomas Franklin Dorman, a long time criminal, was wanted for armed robbery of a grocery store where he and Clyde Edward Laws (#244) got into a gunfight while fleeing police. After shooting an officer in the stomach, they both kidnapped and robbed a soldier of his car. He was arrested in Grantsburg, Indiana on May 20, 1967, by the FBI aided by local and state police.
Jerry Lynn Young	#248	May 12, 1967	One month
Jerry Lynn Young was wanted for multiple bank robberies. He was arrested in Akron, Ohio on June 15, 1967, by FBI agents and local authorities.
Joseph Leroy Newman	#249	June 2, 1967	One month
Joseph Leroy Newman was wanted for escaping prison where he was serving 6 to 8 years for house breaking and larceny. He later shot and killed an off duty narcotics detective because he thought the officer recognized him putting him on the FBI's radar. He was arrested in Jersey City, New Jersey on June 29, 1967, due to an FBI investigation.
Carmen Raymond Gagliardi	#250	June 9, 1967	One year
Carmen Raymond Gagliardi, a mafia hitman, was wanted for the murder of Joe Lanza, a police informant and local bartender. Police had pulled him over when he and an accomplice fled from the car, leaving one man to be arrested. Lanza's body was found with three bullet wounds to the abdomen in the front passenger seat. He was also suspected of involvement in at least 50 other gangland murders. He was arrested in Medford, Massachusetts on December 23, 1968, in his mother's home. He was convicted of second degree murder and was suspected as the killer of Albert DeSalvo, the alleged Boston Strangler. He died in prison from an overdose.
Donald Richard Bussmeyer	#251	June 28, 1967	Two months
Donald Richard Bussmeyer was wanted for robbing a bank in Los Angeles, California. He was arrested in Upland, California, clad only in shorts, on August 24, 1967. A tattoo on his chest "Don Bussmeyer Loves Joyce," gave away his identity.
Florencio Lopez Mationg	#252	July 1, 1967	Two weeks
Florencio Lopez Mationg was wanted for the kidnapping and murders of two Border Patrol agents alongside Victor Jerald Bono (#253) and two others. They were smuggling over 800 pounds of marijuana onto a government reservation. After being stopped at a checkpoint, He and Bono overpowered the agents with pistols, brought them to a desert shack, and shot them in the head. He was arrested in July 1967 in Los Angeles, California, with his partner, Bono, due to an FBI investigation. He was sentenced to two life sentences plus 50 years.
Victor Jerald Bono	#253	July 1, 1967	Two weeks
Victor Jerald Bono was wanted for the kidnapping and murders of two Border Patrol agents alongside Florencio Lopez Mationg (#252) and two others, while smuggling over 800 pounds of marijuana onto a government reservation. After being stopped at a checkpoint, he and Matoing overpowered the agents with pistols, brought them to a desert shack, and shot them in the head. He was arrested in July 1967 in Los Angeles, California, with his partner, Matoing, due to an FBI investigation.
Alfred Johnson Cooper, Jr.	#254	July 27, 1967	Two months
Alfred Johnson Cooper, Jr. was wanted for shooting a police officer during a gas station robbery with two accomplices. While fleeing, they kidnapped a woman and forced her to drive them to Camden, New Jersey where she was released unharmed. He was arrested in Boston, Massachusetts on September 8, 1967. A visitor on the FBI Tour in Washington, D.C., recognized Cooper's photograph on the "Top Ten" display.
John D. Slaton	#255	August 2, 1967	Four months
John D. Slaton was wanted for fleeing and shooting at police after being questioned regarding bad checks. He was arrested in Harquahala Valley, Arizona on December 1, 1967, due to an FBI investigation.
Jerry Ray James	#256	August 16, 1967	Five months
Jerry Ray James, a longtime criminal and member of the Overton gang, was wanted for robbing three residences. Though, as a member of the Overton gang with Timmy Overton, he robbed multiple banks, and ran prostitution and smuggling rings. He was arrested in Tucson, Arizona on January 24, 1968, by FBI agents and local police. His partner, Donald Eugene Sparks (#259), was arrested with him. While serving two life sentences, he would later work with the FBI as an informant after being transferred to Leavenworth prison, informing on an El Paso drug dealer named Jimmy Chagra for the murder of judge John Wood. In exchange, his sentences were commuted, he received $200,000 in rewards, and entered witness protection. However, Chagra was later acquitted.
Richard Paul Anderson	#257	September 7, 1967	Four months
Richard Paul Anderson was wanted for shooting and killing his girlfriend's mother and stepfather after they refused to let him see her. While on the run, he sent letters to the girlfriend while going on a crime spree. After kidnapping and robbing a staff sergeant, he handcuffed him to a tree, unharmed, and fled to Canada in the sergeant's car. He was arrested in Toronto, Ontario, Canada by Canadian Police on January 19, 1968, while committing an armed robbery. He was sentenced to 16 years in Canada, but only served three before being extradited. He was convicted of second degree murder and sentenced to 60 years. However, in 1974, the conviction was appealed after a judge found that manslaughter was never proposed to the jury leading to another trial. He submitted a guilty plea and received 25 years for the murder of the mother. His now ex-girlfriend refused to participate in another trial, therefore, he was never tried for the murder of the stepfather. After being released, he turned his life around, became a painter, had a long-term girlfriend, and became friends with his public defender's investigator. He died from heart problems in 2000.
Henry Theodore Young	#258	September 21, 1967	Four Months
Henry Theodore Young was wanted for escaping Washington State Penitentiary at Walla Walla while serving a life sentence for a 1933 murder conviction. He was previously sought for escaping Alcatraz with Arthur "Doc" Barker in 1939. He was arrested in Kansas City, Missouri on January 9, 1968, after a citizen recognized him from an article in Inside Detective magazine.
Donald Eugene Sparks	#259	August 3, 1967	Five months
Donald Eugene Sparks was wanted for robbing three homes with his partner, Jerry Ray James (#256), while out on bond for assault and armed robbery. They bound and gagged the homeowners; one victim was submerged in a bathtub and threatened with death in order to give up their money. He was arrested in Tucson, Arizona on January 24, 1968, by FBI agents and local police. James was arrested with him.
Zelma Lavone King	#260	December 14, 1967	One month
Zelma Lavone King was wanted for a triple murder where he shot and killed three people in the back of the head over an argument about a refrigerator he was selling. He shot the man who came by to infer about buying the fridge and the landlady who he got into a dispute with over selling the fridge, as there was confusion with the fridge originally in the room he was renting, then also shot a bystander who possibly witnessed the first two shootings. He was arrested in Phoenix, Arizona on January 30, 1968, due to an FBI investigation. In 1969, King was convicted of three counts of murder and sentenced to death, but his sentence was commuted to 100 to 300 years in prison in 1972 as a result of Furman v. Georgia. King was paroled on October 4, 2021, at the age of 79.
Jerry Reece Peacock	#261	December 14, 1967	Three months
Jerry Reece Peacock, a former armored car driver, was wanted for escaping a California prison where he was serving a five-year sentence for armed robbery of an armored car and was also wanted for a murder in Los Angeles. He was arrested in Mesquite, Nevada on March 5, 1968, due to an FBI investigation.

=== 1968 ===
Name	Sequence Number	Date of Entry	Time Listed
Ronald Eugene Storck	#262	January 19, 1968	One month
Ronald Eugene Storck was wanted for the triple murder of an elderly couple and their 11-year-old grandson on a farm in Silverdale, Pennsylvania where he shot the three multiple times during a robbery. He was arrested in Honolulu, Hawaii on February 29, 1968, due to an FBI investigation while on his 30 ft boat at the Honolulu Yacht Club.
Robert Leon McCain	#263	January 31, 1968	Three weeks
Robert Leon McCain was wanted for the murder of a customer of the bank he was robbing. He was part of a group of bank robbers who held up nearly 200 banks across Washington. On February 23, 1968, he held up a grocery store in Gulfport, Florida and was jumped on by a customer who he shot twice. One of the bullets hit McCain. He was subsequently arrested by local police. A police sergeant who had recently finished a training course at the FBI Academy in Quantico, Virginia, recognized McCain from the "Top Ten" Flyers displayed there.
William Garrin Allen II	#264	February 9, 1968	One month
William Garrin Allen II was wanted in connection to the murders of two police officers in Nashville, Tennessee in 1968 alongside Charles Lee Herron (#265). He was arrested in Brooklyn, New York on March 23, 1968, due to an FBI investigation. While in prison serving a term of 99 years, he escaped and met up with Herron in Florida.
Charles Lee Herron	#265	February 9, 1968	Eighteen years
Charles Lee Herron was wanted in connection to the murder of two police officers in Nashville, Tennessee in 1968 alongside William Garrin Allen II (#264). He was arrested in Jacksonville, Florida on June 18, 1986, due to an FBI investigation. In 1987, Herron pleaded guilty to two counts of voluntary manslaughter and was sentenced to two years in prison. After a federal jury deadlocked 11–1 in favor of a conviction, he also pleaded guilty to unlawful flight to avoid prosecution and was sentenced to two years in federal prison.
Leonard Daniel Spears	#266	February 13, 1968	Two weeks
Leonard Daniel Spears was wanted for the murder of a police officer where he and three others robbed a supermarket and fled to a nearby parking lot. They were shot at by an officer as they attempted to switch cars. He was arrested in Tampa, Florida on March 2, 1968, due to an FBI investigation. While at the station, he attempted to give a fake name, but was compared to his most wanted poster to which he exclaimed "It's a good likeness."
William Howard Bornman	#267	February 13, 1968	One day
William Howard Bornman, a longtime criminal, was wanted for escaping custody. He was arrested in Covington, Kentucky on February 13, 1968, due to an FBI investigation. His son, Gary, would be arrested multiple times for numerous bank robberies spanning 30 years. He is currently in federal prison for robbing an East Haven, Connecticut bank in 2020, while on federal supervised leave for robbing another bank in 2019.
John Conway Patterson	#268	February 26, 1968	Three weeks
John Conway Patterson was wanted for shooting and killing a police officer while robbing an Illinois liquor store in 1966. He was arrested in Milwaukee, Wisconsin on March 17, 1968, by local police, and his identity was confirmed by fingerprints.
Troy Denver Martin	#269	March 9, 1968	One week
Troy Denver Martin was wanted for murdering a man then kidnapping another and forcing him to drive to Toledo, Ohio. He was arrested in Seattle, Washington on March 19, 1968, after an employment agency manager recognized him from his Identification Order.
George Benjamin Williams	#270	March 18, 1968	Two months
George Benjamin Williams, a convicted bank robber, was wanted for being the ringleader of another bank robbery where they threatened to kill the bank employees. His skeletal remains were found by prospectors near a mine in Nevada in May 1968. Three bullet holes were in his skull. Williams had been dead for six months.
Michael John Sanders	#271	March 21, 1968	Two weeks
Michael John Sanders was wanted for armed bank robbery. Sanders and three other men were loitering around a store when they were questioned by two deputies, The four men then overpowered them and stole their car. He was arrested in New York, New York on April 8, 1968, due to an FBI investigation. He had been working as a karate instructor.
Howard Callens Johnson	#272	March 21, 1968	One month
Howard Callens Johnson, a longtime criminal, was wanted for killing an 18-year-old boy with a shotgun after having an argument with the boy's mother. He had a prior history of poisoning a well with rat poison to kill his mother-in-law, beating his own mother who was blind, and convictions for assault, arson, and violations of liquor laws. He was arrested in Louisville, Kentucky on April 24, 1968, after a citizen recognized him from a Wanted Poster.
George Edward Wells	#273	March 28, 1968	One year
George Edward Wells, a convicted murderer who was released from prison, was wanted for armed robbery of over $5,000 in coins. He was arrested outside a motel in South Point, Ohio on May 27, 1969, by FBI agents.
David Evans	#274	April 3, 1968	One month
David Evans was wanted for bank robbery. He was arrested in Philadelphia, Pennsylvania on April 26, 1968, after being shot twice by local police as they responded to a burglar alarm at a doctor's home.
Franklin Allen Paris	#275	April 9, 1968	One month
Franklin Allen Paris was wanted for robbery. He was arrested in Lakehead, California on May 21, 1968, due to an FBI investigation. After being tipped off to his location, officers set up a roadblock to the surrounding area that Paris saw, prompting him to drive away and shoot at officers. He then drove up to a convenience store, and forced an elderly man into the store at gun point, before having a second shoot out with police that left the elderly man shot in the head.
David Stuart Neff	#276	April 18, 1968	One week
David Stuart Neff was wanted for bank robbery. He was arrested in Brooklyn, New York on April 25, 1968, due to an FBI investigation.
James Earl Ray	#277	April 20, 1968	Two months
James Earl Ray was apprehended in London, England on June 8, 1968, by British authorities. He was wanted for, and later convicted of, the murder of Dr. Martin Luther King, Jr. He was also #351 on the list.
John Wesley Shannon, Jr.	#278	May 7, 1968	One month
John Wesley Shannon Jr., a longtime criminal, was wanted for bank robbery. He was arrested in Camden, New Jersey on June 5, 1968, by FBI agents and local police.
Taylor Morris Teaford	#279	May 10, 1968	Four years
Taylor Morris Teaford was wanted for shooting and killing his mother. During the murder, he also shot his sister who later managed to escape before wounding a passerby who tried to help. He then exchanged fire with local deputies before fleeing and never being seen again. Federal process against Teaford was dismissed in Fresno, California in 1972.
Phillip Morris Jones	#280	June 5, 1968	Three weeks
Phillip Morris Jones was wanted for several bank robberies in California, Florida, and Maryland. During the robbery in Florida, he locked eight employees in the bank vault, drove to a nearby hotel where he put on swim trunks and pretended to be a tourist at the pool while police searched for him. He then drove to a lake, swam across it, and stole a truck. He walked into the FBI office in San Mateo, California in 1968, and surrendered to authorities after seeing his Wanted Poster in a local post office. At the time of his arrest, he had a fully loaded automatic pistol in his possession.
George Michael Gentile	#281	June 18, 1968	Six months
George Michael Gentile was wanted for racketeering and extortion. He was arrested in New York, New York, by local police on December 17, 1968.
Johnny Ray Smith	#282	June 20, 1968	Four days
Johnny Ray Smith was wanted for escaping prison and transporting stolen vehicles. He was arrested in Ocean Springs, Mississippi on June 24, 1968, after a citizen recognized him from a newspaper article.
Byron James Rice	#283	July 5, 1968	Four years
Byron James Rice was wanted for murdering an armored car guard while robbing it in California. He surrendered to the Chicago, Illinois FBI Field Office on October 2, 1972, following intensive FBI investigative pressure on his acquaintances. In December 1972, Rice was convicted of first degree murder and sentenced to life in prison.
Robert LeRoy Lindblad	#284	July 11, 1968	Three months
Robert LeRoy Lindblad was wanted for the contract killing of two Wyoming business men. They were shot execution-style, their bodies stripped, and placed in shallow graves, by Lindblad and two accomplices. They were hired to murder the men for their insurance money by a local motel owner. He surrendered to the District Attorney of Lyon County, Nevada, in Yerington, Nevada on October 7, 1968. He became an anti-government figure and inherited the Natural Heritage Foundation, a prominent environmental conservation organization. His crimes would later come up again in 2002 during the trial of his son, Christian, where California law would allow the prosecution to throw out Robert's testimony because of his past crimes. Christian had shot his girlfriend, Tina Stebbins, in the right hand, right leg and stomach at a home they shared near his parents, over an argument where she threatened to leave him and take their son with her. Robert and his wife moved her to the garage at the request of their son, attempting to tend to her wounds for a week before police raided the home. They were arrested again when stockpiles of ammunition, grenades, and explosive devices were found in secret rooms in a cabin owned by Robert and his wife. Christian was sentenced to 20 years and then married Stebbins. Robert received three years for being an accessory. Christian's mother received three years probation.
James Joseph Scully	#285	July 15, 1968	One week
James Joseph Scully was wanted for bank robbery. He was arrested in Arcadia, California on July 23, 1968, by FBI agents and local police.
Billy Ray White	#286	August 13, 1968	Four days
Billy Ray White, a.k.a. "Bud", was wanted for robbing a loan company at gunpoint and shooting to death two people while holding up a general store in New Mexico. He was also wanted for attempted murder and armed robbery in Louisiana. He was arrested in Wood River, Illinois on August 17, 1968, after a citizen recognized him from an article in the St. Louis Globe-Democrat newspaper. I March 1969, White was acquitted of the murders.
Frederick Rudolph Yokom	#287	August 29, 1968	One month
Frederick Rudolph Yokom was wanted for murder. He was arrested in Wood River, Illinois on September 6, 1968, after a citizen recognized him. Yokom was convicted of first degree murder and sentenced to life in prison. He was paroled in 1989. In 1998, he pleaded guilty to a jewelry store robbery he committed in 1991.
Harold James Evans	#288	September 19, 1968	Four months
Harold James Evans was wanted for escaping custody with another while being transported from the courthouse back to jail. He had just been convicted of burglary, armed robbery, assault and battery, rape, indecent assault, conspiracy, carrying a deadly weapon, and violations of the National Firearms Act. He was arrested in Chicago, Illinois on January 2, 1969, due to an FBI investigation.
Robert Lee Carr	#289	October 18, 1968	Three weeks
Robert Lee Carr was wanted for escaping prison, where he was serving time for burglary with three others by locking the guards in a cell. He was arrested in South Gate, California on November 4, 1968, after a citizen recognized him from a Wanted Flyer.
Levi Washington	#290	November 15, 1968	Three weeks
Levi Washington was wanted for escaping custody after being arrested for robbing a church where he bound and gagged a nun and shot at another. He was arrested in Jackson, Michigan in December 1968, for a local bank robbery. A fingerprint comparison revealed his true identity.
Richard Lee Tingler Jr.	#291	December 20, 1968	Five months
Richard Lee Tingler Jr. was wanted for multiple murders and robberies across Ohio. He shot three men and a woman in the back of the head multiple times in a Cleveland park, robbed a convenience store where he bound, gagged, beat, shot, and killed two teenage employees, and attempted to strangle the store manager with a coat hanger unsuccessfully. He was arrested near Dill City, Oklahoma on May 19, 1969, by FBI agents and local officers after his employer and his neighbor reported him to the sheriff. In 1969, Tingler was convicted of first degree murder and sentenced to death in 1969, but his sentence was commuted to life in prison in 1972 as a result of Furman v. Georgia. He died in prison in 1995.
Gary Steven Krist	#292	December 20, 1968	Two days
Gary Steven Krist was wanted for the kidnapping of land heiress Barbara Jane Mackle and burying her alive for a $500,000 ransom. He was arrested in Punta Gorda, Florida in December 1968, by FBI and local police. Krist and his partner, Ruth Eisemann-Schier (#293), were later indicted on Georgia state charges of kidnapping with ransom. He was the third Special Addition to the list. Krist was convicted of kidnapping and sentenced to life in prison. He was paroled after 10 years.
Ruth Eisemann-Schier	#293	December 28, 1968	Three months
Ruth Eisemann-Schier kidnapped a millionaire's daughter and became the first woman on the Ten Most Wanted list. On March 5, 1969, she was arrested in Norman, Oklahoma, by FBI agents. Eisemann-Schier and her partner, Gary Steven Krist (#292), were later indicted on Georgia state charges of kidnapping with ransom. Eisemann-Schier later pleaded guilty to kidnapping and was sentenced to 7 years in prison. She was paroled after serving four years.

=== 1969 ===
Name	Sequence Number	Date of Entry	Time Listed
Baltazar Garcia Estolas	#294	January 3, 1969	Eight months
Baltazar Garcia Estolas was wanted for shooting three clerks of a Mariani's clothing store in the head while robbing it of $3,000. Afterwards, he was pursued by the owner of a liquor store nearby where a shootout occurred in the street. He then abandoned the cash and his car before kidnapping two teenage girls by forcing them at gunpoint to drive him to San Francisco, where he dropped them off at a Greyhound bus depot. He claimed he needed the money for an operation to prevent his death in two months. He was arrested in Langtry, Texas on September 3, 1969, after a citizen recognized him from television publicity. He was sentenced to death in 1970, but his sentence was commuted to life in prison in 1972 as a result of People v. Anderson and he was declared insane in 1974.
Billie Austin Bryant	#295	January 8, 1969	2 hours
Billie Austin Bryant was wanted for the murder of two FBI agents who were investigating a Maryland bank robbery. He was arrested after an all-out manhunt by area police and the FBI. Bryant was arrested on January 8, 1969, in Washington, D.C., by the Metropolitan Police Department. A local resident heard noises in his attic and contacted the police. Found hiding in the attic, Bryant was just four blocks from his home where he fatally shot FBI agents Anthony Palmisano and Edwin R. Woodriffe. He has the shortest time spent on the list. Bryant was convicted of two counts of first degree murder, sentenced to life in prison, and died in prison in 2009.
Billy Len Schales	#296	January 27, 1969	Three days
Billy Len Schales, a former mental patient, was wanted for assault with the intent to murder when he stabbed a Texas housewife. He was arrested in Bossier City, Louisiana on January 30, 1969, after a citizen recognized him from a newspaper article in the Shreveport Times.
Thomas James Lucas	#297	February 13, 1969	Two weeks
Thomas James Lucas was wanted for bank robbery. He was a member of the six "Panty Hose" bank bandits. He was arrested in Washington, D.C. on February 26, 1969, after a citizen recognized him from a Wanted Flyer.
Warren David Reddock	#298	March 11, 1969	Two years
Warren David Reddock was wanted for murder. Under an alias, he entered an employment agreement with Harvey Rosenzweig in 1968 which included a real estate deal for an arms manufacturing company with Rosenzweig as president. As the deal was being discussed over the course of a few weeks, Reddock bludgeoned Rosenzweig with a hatchet and left his body on the soon to be bought property. He then assumed Rosenzweig's identity, forging checks in his name, traveling the world. He was arrested in Pacifica, California on April 14, 1971, after a citizen recognized him from a magazine article.
George Edward Blue	#299	March 20, 1969	One week
George Edward Blue was wanted for robbing a bank with three others while out on probation for several robberies. He was arrested in Chicago, Illinois on March 28, 1969, due to an FBI investigation.
Cameron David Bishop	#300	April 15, 1969	Six years
Cameron David Bishop, a member of the radical leftist group Students for a Democratic Society, was wanted for a series of dynamite bombings of power utility towers that powered nearby military bases. He was arrested when local police in East Greenwich, Rhode Island, received an anonymous phone call advising them to be on the lookout for four armed men in a car near a bank. Two days later, on March 12, 1975, police located the car and arrested the men; Bishop was one of them.
Marie Dean Arrington	#301	May 29, 1969	Two years
Marie Dean Arrington was wanted for escaping from death row while awaiting execution for the murder of a secretary to the public defender who she felt failed to keep her two children out of prison. She took her hostage, shot her multiple times, and ran her over with the victim's own car. She was arrested in New Orleans, Louisiana on December 22, 1971, by FBI agents. She was the second woman to be named to the list. Arrington's death sentence was commuted to life in prison as a result of Furman v. Georgia. She died in prison in 2014.
Benjamin Hoskins Paddock	#302	June 10, 1969	Eight years
Benjamin Hoskins Paddock was wanted for escaping La Tuna federal penitentiary where he was serving 20 years for multiple bank robberies. He was removed from the list in 1977 when it was felt he no longer fit the "Top Ten" criteria. He was also the father of the 2017 Las Vegas shooter.
Francis Leroy Hohimer	#303	June 20, 1969	Six months
Francis Leroy Hohimer, a career burglar, was wanted for his connection to organized crime and numerous burglaries. He was a part of a gang of thieves, backed by the Mafia, that would travel around robbing wealthy homes. In exchange for a cut, the Mafia helped in planning and a person to fence the stolen goods. He was arrested in Greenwich, Connecticut on December 20, 1969, through citizen cooperation. Prior to these robberies in 1966, he was the key suspect in the murder of Illinois state Senator Charles H. Percy's daughter, Valerie Percy. However, no physical evidence could place him at the scene despite testimony from others that he allegedly confessed to leaving the case unsolved.
Joseph Lloyd Thomas	#304	September 12, 1969	Six months
Joseph Lloyd Thomas was wanted for bank robbery and parole violation. After robbing the bank, he took his wife and three kids on the run with him. He was arrested in Peoria, Illinois on March 8, 1970, due to an FBI investigation. He was also #123 on the list.

== End of the decade ==
By the end of the decade, the following fugitives were remaining at large on the FBI's Ten Most Wanted list:

Name	Sequence number	Date of entry
John William Clousre	#203	1965
Charles Lee Herron	#265	1968
Taylor Morris Teaford	#279	1968
Byron James Rice	#282	1968
Warren David Reddock	#298	1969
Cameron David Bishop	#300	1969
Marie Dean Arrington	#301	1969
Benjamin Hoskin Paddock	#302	1969
Joseph Lloyd Thomas	#304	1969

The tenth space had just opened up at the end of the year 1969.

== FBI directors in the 1960s ==
- J. Edgar Hoover (1935–1972)
