= Teaford =

Teaford is a surname of German origin, and an Americanized variant of Tiefert, Tiffert, or Differt. Notable people with the surname include:

- Everett Teaford (born 1984), American baseball player
- Jon C. Teaford, American historian
- Taylor Morris Teaford (born 1935), American fugitive and suspected murderer
