= List of FBI employees killed in the line of duty =

The following is a list of employees of the U.S. Federal Bureau of Investigation who have been killed in the line of duty.

== List ==
#	Name	Rank/Position	Place of birth	Entry into service	Year of death	Cause of death	Citation	Details
1	Edwin C. Shanahan	Special Agent	Illinois	1920	1925	Gunfire		Shanahan was the agency's first employee to be killed in the line of duty
2	Paul E. Reynolds	Special Agent	Illinois	1921	1929	Undetermined		
3	Albert L. Ingle	Special Agent	Mississippi	1931	1931	Accidental discharge		
4	Raymond J. Caffrey	Special Agent	Nebraska	1927	1933	Gunfire		Caffrey was a victim of the Kansas City massacre
5	W. Carter Baum	Special Agent	District of Columbia	1930	1934	Gunfire		Baum was ambushed by Baby Face Nelson
6	Samuel P. Cowley	Inspector	Idaho	1929	1934	Gunfire		Killed in a shootout with Baby Face Nelson
7	Herman E. Hollis	Special Agent	Iowa	1927	1934	Gunfire		Killed in a shootout with Baby Face Nelson
8	Nelson B. Klein	Special Agent	New York	1926	1935	Gunfire		Klein's killer was the first person in the United States to be executed for killing a federal law enforcement officer
9	Wimberly W. Baker	Special Agent	Illinois	1937	1937	Gunfire		
10	Truett E. Rowe	Special Agent	Arkansas	1935	1937	Gunfire		
11	William R. Ramsey	Special Agent	Kentucky	1933	1938	Gunfire		
12	Hubert J. Treacy Jr.	Special Agent	New York	1941	1942	Gunfire		
13	Richard B. Brown	Special Agent	Oklahoma	1941	1943	Vehicle-related accident		
14	Percy E. Foxworth	Assistant; Director	Missouri	1932	1943	Vehicle-related accident		The Liberty ship SS Percy E. Foxworth was named after Foxworth
15	Harold D. Haberfeld	Special Agent	Missouri	1941	1943	Vehicle-related accident		
16	Marvin Risen	Special Agent	Kentucky	1939	1943	Vehicle-related accident		
17	J. Cordes Delworth	Special Agent	Missouri	1941	1945	Vehicle-related accident		
18	Joseph J. Brock	Special Agent	Wisconsin	1941	1952	Gunfire		Brock was killed by Gerhard Puff
19	J. Brady Murphy	Special Agent	Maryland	1940	1953	Gunfire		
20	Richard P. Horan	Special Agent	Connecticut	1948	1957	Gunfire		
21	Lee E. Morrow	Special Agent	Minnesota	1951	1960	Vehicle-related accident		
22	Joseph I. Hart	Special Agent	Idaho	1940	1962	Vehicle-related accident		
23	Charles B. Smith	Special Agent	Alabama	1942	1963	Vehicle-related accident		
24	Billie W. Taylor	Electronic; Maintenance; Technician	Florida	1954	1965	Fall		
25	Terry R. Anderson	Special Agent	Iowa	1951	1966	Gunfire		Anderson was ambushed by Peggy Ann Bradnick's kidnapper
26	Douglas M. Price	Special Agent	Idaho	1967	1968	Gunfire		
27	Nelson B. Klein Jr.	Special Agent	New Jersey	1955	1969	Vehicle-related accident		
28	Anthony Palmisano	Special Agent	New Jersey	1960	1969	Gunfire		
29	Edwin R. Woodriffe	Special Agent	New York	1967	1969	Gunfire		Woodriffe was the agency's first African-American employee to be killed in the line of duty
30	Charles L. Brown Jr.	Special Agent	Texas	1954	1973	Vehicle-related accident		
31	Gregory W. Spinelli	Special Agent	Pennsylvania	1970	1973	Gunfire		
32	Edward J. Knartzer	Special Agent	Indiana	1963	1974	Accident		
33	Sheila J. Regan	Special Agent	Virginia	1972	1974	Vehicle-related accident		
34	Jack R. Coler	Special Agent	California	1971	1975	Gunfire		Killed by Leonard Peltier
35	Ronald A. Williams	Special Agent	California	1972	1975	Gunfire		Killed by Leonard Peltier
36	Trenwith S. Basford	Special Agent	Montana	1942	1977	Vehicle-related accident		
37	Mark A. Kirkland	Special Agent	Utah	1972	1977	Vehicle-related accident		
38	Charles W. Elmore	Special Agent	Washington	1972	1979	Gunfire		
39	Johnnie L. Oliver	Special Agent	Illinois	1965	1979	Gunfire		
40	J. Robert Porter	Special Agent	Arizona	1967	1979	Gunfire		
41	Robert W. Conners	Special Agent	Ohio	1979	1982	Vehicle-related accident		
42	Charles Ellington	Special Agent	Georgia	1979	1982	Vehicle-related accident		
43	Terry B. Hereford	Special Agent	California	1979	1982	Vehicle-related accident		
44	Michael J. Lynch	Special Agent	Ohio	1976	1982	Vehicle-related accident		
45	Clifton Browning Jr.	Special Agent	Ohio	1963	1984	Vehicle-related accident		
46	Robin L. Ahrens	Special Agent	Minnesota	1984	1985	Gunfire		Ahrens was the agency's first female employee to be killed in the line of duty
47	James K. McAllister	Special Agent	Kentucky	1970	1986	Training-related accident		
48	Jerry Dove	Special Agent	West Virginia	1982	1986	Gunfire		Killed in the 1986 Miami shootout
49	Benjamin P. Grogan	Special Agent	Georgia	1961	1986	Gunfire		Killed in the 1986 Miami shootout
50	Scott K. Carey	Special Agent	New York	1983	1988	Vehicle-related accident		
51	L. Douglas Abram	Special Agent	Missouri	1976	1990	Gunfire		
52	John L. Bailey	Special Agent	Massachusetts	1969	1990	Gunfire		
53	Paul F. Cavanagh	Special Agent	Massachusetts	1971	1990	Training-related accident		
54	Stanley C. Ronquest Jr.	Special Agent	Missouri	1971	1992	Gunfire		
55	Martha D. Martinez	Special Agent	Pennsylvania	1987	1994	Gunfire		
56	Michael J. Miller	Special Agent	Maryland	1984	1994	Gunfire		
57	William H. Christian Jr.	Special Agent	Maryland	1975	1995	Gunfire		
58	Charles L. Reed	Special Agent	Iowa	1979	1996	Gunfire		
59	Paul A. LeVeille	Special Agent	Maine	1996	1999	Training-related accident		
60	Leonard W. Hatton Jr.	Special Agent	New Jersey	1985	2001	Terrorism		Hatton was killed during the September 11 attacks
61	Robert R. Hardesty	Special Agent	Indiana	2001	2005	Training-related accident		
62	Gregory J. Rahoi	Supervisory; Special; Agent	Wisconsin	1997	2006	Training-related accident		
63	Barry L. Bush	Special Agent	New Jersey	1987	2007	Gunfire		
64	Paul H. Wilson	Special Agent	Pennsylvania	1981	2007	9/11-related medical condition		
65	Samuel S. Hicks	Special Agent	Pennsylvania	2007	2008	Gunfire		
66	Sang T. Jun	Special Agent	Florida	2003	2008	Training-related condition		
67	Robert M. Roth	Special Agent	District of Columbia	1996	2008	9/11-related medical condition		
68	Laurie Fournier	Special Agent	New York	1990	2009	9/11-related medical condition		
69	Paul M. Sorce	Special Agent	Michigan	1991	2009	Accident		
70	Jerry D. Jobe	Special Agent	Kansas	1999	2010	9/11-related medical condition		
71	Daniel L. Knapp	Special Agent	California	2005	2011	Off-duty related accident		
72	Gerard D. Senatore	Special Agent	New Jersey	1990	2011	9/11-related medical condition		
73	William R. Craig	Special Agent	Pennsylvania	1971	2012	9/11-related medical condition		
74	Christopher W. Lorek	Special Agent	Illinois	1996	2013	Training-related accident		
75	Stephen P. Shaw	Special Agent	California	2005	2013	Training-related accident		
76	Mark J. Mikulski	Supervisory; Special; Agent	New York	1963	2014	9/11-related medical condition		
77	Steven A. Carr	Supervisory; Special; Agent	————	1995	2015	9/11-related medical condition		
78	Gladys M. Lee	Support; Services; Technician	North Carolina	1998	2015	9/11-related medical condition		
79	Wesley J. Yoo	Special Agent	South Korea	1996	2015	9/11-related medical condition		
80	Rex A. Stockham	Supervisory; Special; Agent	California	1984	2016	9/11-related medical condition		
81	Dennis Bonelli	Special Agent	New Jersey	1983	2017	9/11-related medical condition		
82	Mark Johnston	Supervisory; Special; Agent	New Jersey	1983	2017	9/11-related medical condition		
83	Rickey O’Donald	Special Agent	Michigan	1987	2017	Training-related medical condition		
84	Melica Sanders	Evidence; Technician	Arkansas	1985	2017	9/11-related medical condition		
85	Shannon M. Beck	Evidence; Technician	California	1995	2018	9/11-related medical condition		
86	Brian L. Crews	Supervisory; Special; Agent	————	1988	2018	9/11-related medical condition		
87	David J. LeValley	Supervisory; Special; Agent	New Jersey	1996	2018	9/11-related medical condition		
88	Melissa S. Morrow	Supervisory; Special; Agent	Missouri	1995	2018	9/11-related medical condition		
89	William H. Lewis	Electronics; Technician	Virginia	1990	2019	9/11-related medical condition		
90	Saul C. Tocker	Supervisory; Investigative; Specialist	Maryland	1990	2020	9/11-related medical condition		
91	Daniel Alfin	Special Agent	New York	2009	2021	Gunfire		Alfin was killed in the 2021 Sunrise shootout
92	Nicole Conti	Supervisory; Administrative; Specialist	New York	1999	2021	9/11-related medical condition		
93	Jimmie J. Daniels	Special Agent	Texas	2006	2021	Training-related medical condition		
94	Thomas J. Mohnal	Supervisory; Special; Agent	Pennsylvania	1980	2021	9/11-related medical condition		
95	Laura Schwartzenberger	Special Agent	Colorado	2005	2021	Gunfire		Schwartzenberger was killed in the 2021 Sunrise shootout
96	Todd Spiker	Supervisory; Special; Agent	California	1996	2021	9/11-related medical condition		
97	Bryan Myers	Supervisory; Administrative; Specialist	Alabama	1992	2022	9/11-related medical condition		
98	Yiu T. Tao	Supervisory; Police; Officer	Hong Kong	1996	2022	9/11-related medical condition		
99	Anne H. Call	Secretary (Office Automation)	District of Columbia	1986	2023	9/11-related medical condition		
100	Jack Hess	Supervisory; Special; Agent	New Jersey	1988	2023	9/11-related medical condition		
101	Diane Hunt	Operational; Support; Technician	New York	1988	2023	9/11-related medical condition		
102	Donald Kleber	Special Agent	New Jersey	1977	2024	9/11-related medical condition		

== See also ==
- List of law enforcement officers killed in the line of duty in the United States
