= Charles Herron =

Charles Herron may refer to:

- Charles D. Herron (1877–1977), United States Army general
- Charles Lee Herron (born 1937), American former fugitive
- Charles H. Fairbanks (1913–1984), American anthropologist
