= Monroe Hickson =

American serial killer

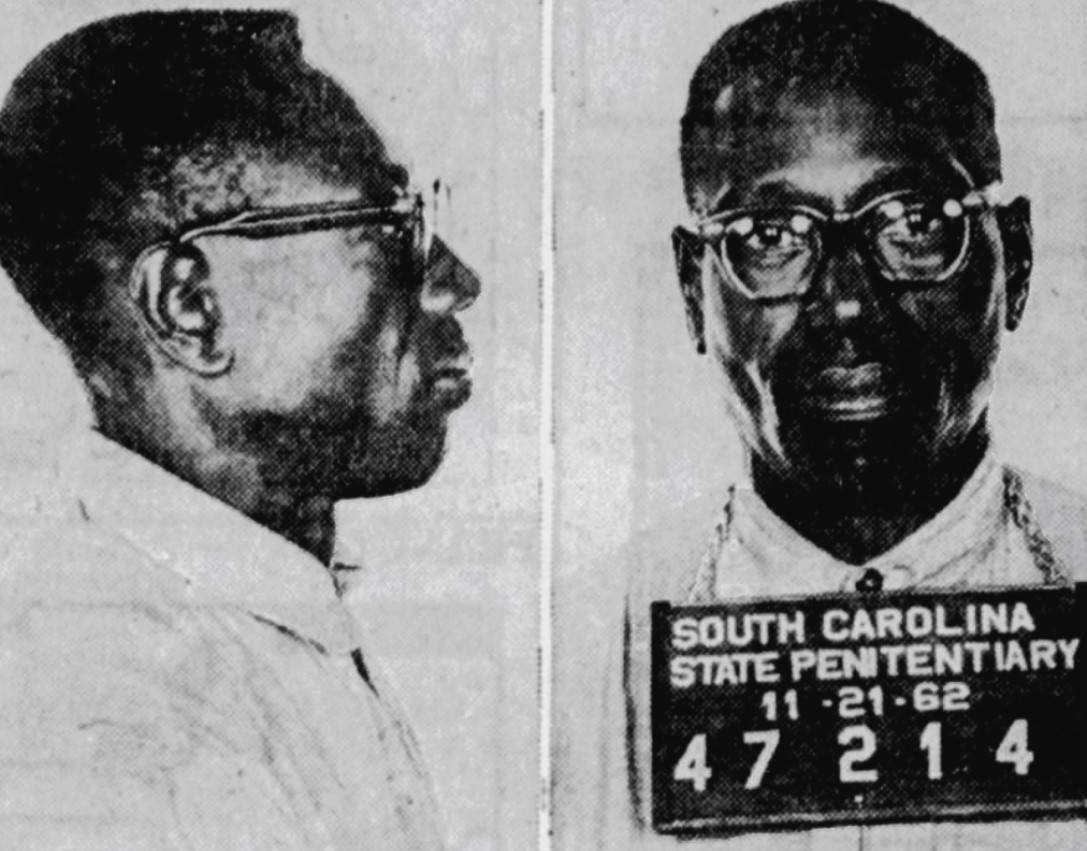

FBI Ten Most Wanted Fugitive
- Alias: Willie Tyler "Bluecorns"

Description
- Born: July 8, 1908; Aiken County, South Carolina, U.S.
- Died: December 29, 1967 (aged 59); Chapel Hill, North Carolina, U.S.
- Gender: Male

Status
- Convictions: Murder (4 counts)
- Penalty: Life imprisonment
- Added: February 17, 1967
- Number: 243
- Deceased prior to capture

Monroe Hickson (July 8, 1908 – December 29, 1967) was an American serial killer and fugitive who committed four murders and the attempted murder of a fifth in the city of Aiken, South Carolina, from April to October 1946. His crimes went mostly unnoticed until he abruptly confessed to them after being arrested for assault in 1957. Prior to that, another man, L.D. Harris, had been wrongly sentenced to death in 1947 for two of the murders, albeit his conviction was vacated on appeal in 1949. After his confessions, Hickson was convicted and sentenced to four life terms.

In 1966, while serving his sentence at Manning Correctional Institution, he escaped from custody and remained elusive for nearly two years. He was added to the FBI Ten Most Wanted Fugitives list but was never recaptured, as he was found dead in North Carolina in 1968.

== Early life ==
Monroe Hickson was born on July 8, 1908, in Aiken, South Carolina. Little is known about his childhood, apart from the fact that he had limited formal education. Despite this, he was said to have been very intelligent, and was an avid reader of the Bible, regularly carrying one with him.

== Crimes ==
Hickson was convicted of assault with intent to kill in 1931 and was sentenced to five years in prison, but he was released early in 1933. In 1937, Hickson was convicted of burglary and larceny and sentenced to one year in prison.

Hickson committed his first murder on April 17, 1946, when he attacked David Garrett with an axe at Garrett's shop in Aiken and killed him. Afterwards, he robbed the shop and stole a pistol. Eleven days later, on April 28, Hickson entered a grocery store owned by 33-year-old Edward and 25-year-old Mary Bennett. He brandished the gun he stole from Garrett and fatally shot Mary and injured Edward. Edward later exclaimed to police that "a big negro shot me and robbed me" before succumbing to his injuries. The three murders, which took place in a short amount to time, were quickly connected and a $2,500 reward was published for any information leading to an arrest.

On September 28, Hickson attacked Annie Wiseburg at her home, where he stabbed and bludgeoned her to death. In October, Hickson attacked a female liquor store clerk with a brick, however, she survived. He was arrested shortly after the last attack, but was not linked to the previous crimes, and was sentenced to 20 years imprisonment. On October 5, 1947, Hickson managed to escape from jail but was quickly apprehended by police officer G. C. Johnson.

=== Wrongful conviction of L.D. Harris ===
During the investigation of the Bennett slayings, police were notified about L.D. Harris, who had left town for Nashville, Tennessee shortly after the murders. Harris, who was illiterate, was questioned without a lawyer, and he confessed to the murders. In January 1947, Harris' case went to trial. His defense claimed that besides the confession, which they claimed was the result of pressure from higher authority, no other evidence linked Harris to the crime.

Nevertheless, the jury found Harris guilty on all counts, and he was sentenced to death. His lawyers attempted to appeal his sentence by contacting the Supreme Court of South Carolina, but they found no basis that his confession was involuntary. In 1948, Harris appealed to the United States Supreme Court, and they noted several factors that made his confession involuntary; Harris had not been informed of his rights under South Carolina law, had no access to family or friends, and the persistence of the authorities. As such of this, in June 1949, the Supreme Court voted 5–4 in favor that Harris' sentence should be reversed. Afterwards, Harris was released from prison.

== Capture and escape ==
On August 8, 1957, Hickson was arrested after perpetrating another violent assault, in which he attempted to kill Lucy Hill Parker, leaving her with a serious head injury. In the subsequent interrogation, Sheriff Wyman Busch questioned Hickson about other crimes, after noticing patterns in Hickson's movements to unsolved murders in the area. After this, Hickson confessed to having perpetrated four murders in the Aiken area in 1946, but claimed he was drunk each time he committed the crimes. Hickson pleaded guilty to four counts of murder to avoid a possible death sentence and received four consecutive life sentences.

Hickson served his sentence at the Manning Correctional Institution in Columbia. On March 10, 1966, while working in the prison's outside yard, he managed to walk off without the guards noticing. A federal warrant was issued the following month, but with no leads in sight, Hickson was added to the FBI Ten Most Wanted Fugitives list on February 17, 1967. In 1968, a couple from Chapel Hill, North Carolina came forward with information, after identifying Hickson to a migrant farm worker named Willie Tyler who had died on December 29. A positive identification was later made via fingerprinting.

== See also ==
- List of serial killers in the United States
- FBI Ten Most Wanted Fugitives by year, 1967
