= Donald Richard Bussmeyer =

American bank robber

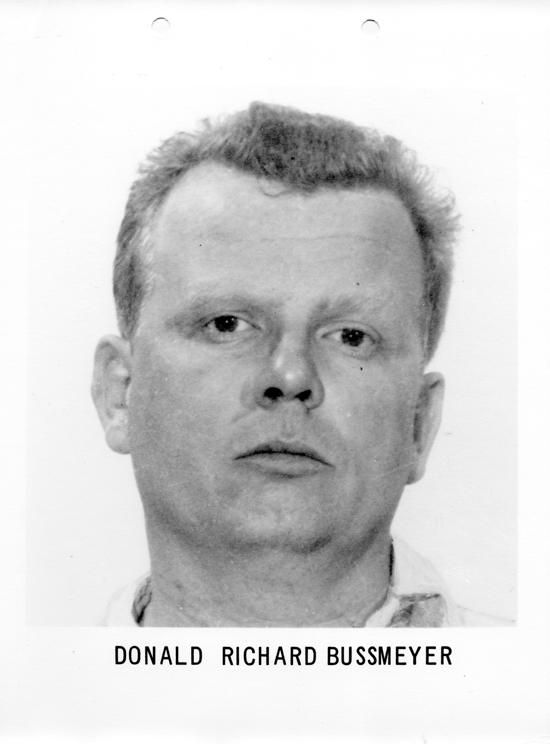

FBI Ten Most Wanted Fugitive
- Charges: Bank robbery

Description
- Born: August 16, 1936; St. Louis, Missouri, U.S.
- Died: February 7, 1995 (aged 58); St. Louis, Missouri, U.S.

Status
- Added: June 28, 1967
- Caught: August 24, 1967
- Number: 251
- Captured

Donald Richard Bussmeyer (August 16, 1936 – February 7, 1995) was an American criminal who was a member of the FBI's Ten Most Wanted list in 1967.

Bussmeyer died on February 7, 1995, at Barnes Hospital in St. Louis.

== Life as a criminal ==
Bussmeyer was a career criminal with prior convictions for auto theft, attempted burglary, assault with intent to kill and armed robbery.

On March 2, 1967, he and two accomplices, James Alaway and Russell Jones, robbed $75,000 from a Los Angeles bank, which made him a federal fugitive.

== Arrest ==
Alaway was arrested on March 9 and later sentenced to 17 years imprisonment. Jones was arrested on March 10 and later sentenced to 10 years imprisonment.

Bussmeyer was able to evade authorities and, after being indicted on federal bank robbery charges in April, he was officially added as the 251st fugitive to the FBI's "Ten Most Wanted" list on June 28, 1967.

Due to large media coverage and publicity, Bussmeyer was traced to a safehouse in Upland, California within two months. On August 24 Bussmeyer was arrested at the safehouse along with his wife Hallie and associate Gene Harrington. Although two pistols were found in the house, Bussmeyer offered no resistance. His identity was confirmed by a tattoo reading "Don Bussmeyer Loves Joyce" on his chest.

Hallie Bussmeyer and Harrington was held in federal custody for harboring a federal fugitive, while Bussmeyer, held under a $200,000 bond, would eventually be tried and convicted of the Los Angeles bank robbery. Bussmeyer was released from prison on December 29, 1994.
