= Hugh Morse =

American serial killer

- Morse in 1995 (Minnesota Department of Corrections)
- Born: Hugh Bion Morse; January 9, 1930; Kansas City, Missouri, U.S.
- Died: April 2003 (aged 73); Minnesota Correctional Facility, Bayport, Minnesota, U.S.
- Other name: Chris Morse
- Occupations: Truck driver; Hotel clerk; Car wash attendant; Taxi cab driver; Farm worker; Bellboy; Dishwasher; Dry cleaner; Telephone installer
- Conviction: Second degree murder
- Penalty: Life imprisonment

Details
- Victims: 4+
- Span of crimes: 1951–1961
- Country: United States
- States: North Carolina, California, Washington, Georgia, Ohio, Alabama, Minnesota
- Date apprehended: October 13, 1961

Hugh Bion Morse (January 9, 1930 – April 2003) was an American serial killer who committed numerous crimes across the United States during the 1950s and 1960s. With the help of the FBI, Morse was arrested, tried, and convicted on one count of murder in Minnesota, and is known to have committed murders in Alabama and Washington beforehand. He also committed rape, burglary, assault, attempted murder, and child molestation in at least four other states.

== Early life ==
Hugh Bion Morse was born on January 9, 1930, in Kansas City, Missouri. Though little is known about his childhood, Morse entered the United States Army sometime during the 1940s. In 1946, he was AWOL from the United States Air Force. In 1950, Morse went AWOL again, this time from the Marines, and soon traveled to North Carolina.

== Crimes ==
Morse first came to attention of law enforcement after a May 1951 arrest for indecent exposure and assault in Wilmington, North Carolina. For this, Morse was dishonorably discharged in December 1951.

Afterward, Morse traveled to California, where he committed a series of burglaries in Los Angeles. After he was caught, he was sentenced to serve a total of six months in jail and three years' probation. In 1955, Morse lured two 8-year-old girls to an alleyway in Fairfield with the promise of ice cream and proceeded to sexually assault both. He was arrested and was transferred to the California State Hospital where he was declared a sexual psychopath. He was housed at the center until he was released on January 4, 1957, with a required one-year probation.

Morse arrived in Spokane, Washington shortly after. In later interviews with the Federal Bureau of Investigation (FBI), Morse stated that he began to spy on women within their own homes who were completely unaware of his presence. On November 7, 1959, he broke into the home of 28-year-old Glorie Brie, and proceeded to rape and subsequently murder her. Ten months later, on September 26, 1960, 69-year-old Blanche Boggs became Morse's second known victim, having been raped and murdered. On October 25, 23-year-old Beverly Myers was severely beaten by Morse in her home but managed to survive her wounds.

Three days later, in the early hours of October 28, Morse traveled from Spokane to Reseda, California. There, armed with a knife, he invaded his ex-wife Virginia's home, where he proceeded to attack her. Unknown to him, his mother-in-law was present in the home, reportedly screaming, causing Morse to run out of the home and flee the state of Washington, embarking cross country.

Morse eventually wound up in traveling through multiple states while on the run, eventually winding up in Atlanta, Georgia. In April 1961, Morse broke into the apartment of an unnamed woman, threatening her and her three daughters with a knife. He then molested one of the daughters and left the home without harming them any more. A week later, Morse entered the same apartment building and broke into a different room, where he encountered an 18-year-old woman and raped her at knifepoint. Afterwards he fled the building and the state of Georgia altogether.

A month later, in April 1961, Morse forced his way into a woman's apartment in Dayton, Ohio. At knifepoint he proceeded to rape, beat, and stab her several times before leaving her for dead. She survived.

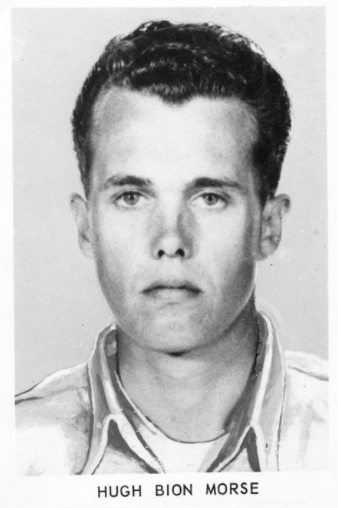
Morse's FBI most wanted photo; note the image was taken in 1954

Having to flee another state, Morse abandoned Ohio and embarked to Birmingham, Alabama. There, on July 11, 1961, Morse entered the home of 27-year-old Bobbi Ann Landini, where he raped her and beat her to death with a pipe. Afterwards he sexually assaulted her dead body. In August 1961, the FBI was brought in to locate Morse, officially adding him to the FBI's ten most wanted list.

Morse continued his travels until he ended up in St. Paul, Minnesota. There, on September 18, 1961, he raped and murdered 34-year-old Carol Ronan. It was not long until Mrs. Harold L. Carlson, 21, who was on her honeymoon recognized Morse's photo and reported him to the police, where he was arrested on October 13, 1961. After his arrest, Morse confessed to all four murders.

== Incarceration ==
Morse was charged with second degree murder for the killing of Ronan, for which he received a life sentence. In December 1963, Morse attempted to commit suicide in his jail cell at Minnesota Correctional Facility by slashing his wrists and his neck with a blade. A prison officer noticed Morse laying down covered in blood in his cell. He was treated by the prison doctors, after which Morse made a full recovery.

In 1979, the 49-year-old Morse was extradited to Washington to plead guilty to the murders of Glorie Brie and Blanche Boggs, and to the assault on Beverly Myers. Morse waived his rights and agreed to never return to Washington ever again, and was given a life time of probation for these crimes. He died in prison in April 2003. By the time of his death, he was 73 years old, and had served 42 years in prison.

=== Other murders ===
Morse was suspected in other unsolved cases from around the time he was active. By the time of his arrest, Morse had become a suspect in the March 1959 murder of 9-year-old Candy Rogers in Spokane, Washington. He first came to attention when investigators noticed several similarities in his movement and Rogers' murder. When confronted, Morse denied killing Rogers. The evidence from Candy Rogers murder was re-examined in 2001, thanks to which a DNA sample from the killer was compared to Morse's DNA. However, the results came back negative, excluding Morse as her killer. In 2021, DNA was used to link John Reigh Hoff to her murder. Morse was also questioned after his arrest in the disappearance of Ann Marie Burr, who had gone missing in Tacoma, Washington in August 1961.

== See also ==
- List of serial killers in the United States
- FBI Ten Most Wanted Fugitives by year, 1961
