= Robert Van Lewing =

American bank robber

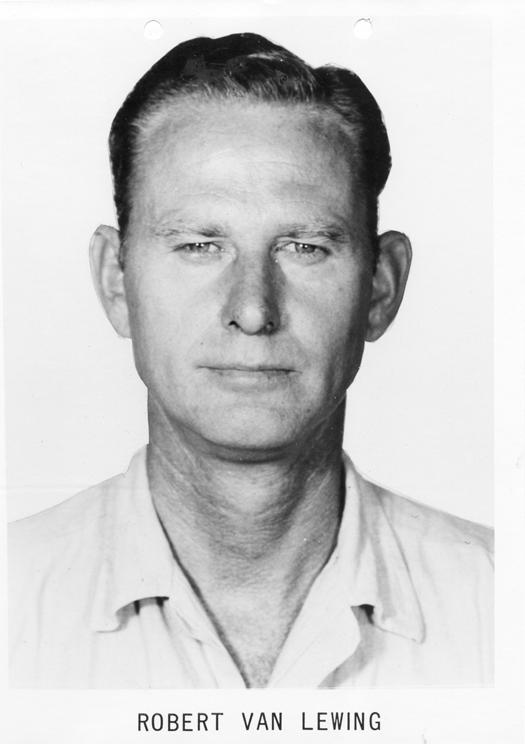

FBI Ten Most Wanted Fugitive
- Charges: Armed robbery

Description
- Born: March 27, 1921
- Died: December 17, 1983 (aged 62)

Status
- Added: January 12, 1966
- Caught: February 6, 1967
- Number: 226
- Captured

Robert Van Lewing (March 27, 1921 – December 17, 1983) was an American bank robber and fugitive on the FBI's Ten Most Wanted list from 1966 to 1967.

== Background ==
A long time career criminal, Lewing had a lengthy history of arrests and convictions for a number of armed robbery charges. On October 28th, 1965, Lewing robbed a bank in Houston, Texas where he made off with $31,493 which officially added him as the 226th fugitive to the FBI's Ten Most Wanted list on January 12, 1966.

He was arrested by FBI agents on February 6, 1967 in Kansas City, Missouri, after a neighbor reported his location to the FBI as he exited his house with an 18-year-old.

== Books ==
- Newton, Michael. Encyclopedia of Robbers, Heists, and Capers. New York: Facts On File Inc., 2002.
