= Disappearance of Ann Marie Burr =

1961 American missing person case

Coordinates: 47.262940°N 122.475380°W

Ann Marie Burr
- Undated photo of Burr
- Born: December 14, 1952; Del Norte County, California, U.S.
- Disappeared: August 31, 1961 (aged 8); Tacoma, Washington, U.S.
- Status: Missing for 65 years, 2 months and 13 days
- Height: 4 ft 2 in (1.27 m)

Ann Marie Burr was an eight‑year‑old American missing person who disappeared in 1961 from her family's home in the North End neighborhood of Tacoma, Washington, United States. She was last seen on August 31, 1961, and was likely kidnapped. The case prompted an intensive search and drew national attention, but no trace of Burr has ever been found. Convicted killer Ted Bundy was as a suspect in the Burr case, but no conclusive evidence has linked him to the disappearance.

Burr was discovered missing at 5:30 a.m. from the upstairs bedroom she shared with her three‑year‑old sister. A search of the residence revealed the front door ajar and a living‑room window open, leading authorities to suspect she had been kidnapped during the night. Extensive searches involving local police, soldiers from Fort Lewis and members of the National Guard failed to locate the child.

Serial killer Ted Bundy became a person of interest following his 1978 arrest on murder charges in Florida. Investigators learned he had lived near the Burr residence and delivered newspapers in the area. Bundy was 14 years old when Burr disappeared, and had been known to exhibit disturbing behavior from an early age. A size‑6 shoe print was found beneath an open window at the Burr home, and some investigators believed this evidence was consistent with a teenage perpetrator. Bundy denied involvement, but Burr's parents came to believe Bundy was the most probable suspect. Based on circumstantial evidence and correspondence with Bundy before his 1989 execution, they believed their daughter's remains might have been buried on the University of Puget Sound campus.

In 2011, forensic testing of material from the crime scene yielded insufficient DNA for comparison with Bundy.

== Life ==
Ann Marie Burr was born December 14, 1952, in Del Norte County, California, into a Catholic family. She was the first of four children, with two younger sisters—Julie and Mary—and one younger brother, Gregory, born to Donald and Beverly (née Leach) Burr. Prior to her disappearance, Burr's family had moved into a house in the North End neighborhood of Tacoma, Washington, located at 3009 North 14th Street.

== Disappearance ==
On the evening of August 30, 1961, Burr and her three siblings were sent to bed around 8:00 p.m. by their parents. Earlier that evening, Burr had eaten dinner at the nearby home of a friend. Burr and her sister Mary (age 3) shared an upstairs bedroom, while brother Gregory (age 5) and sister Julie (age 7) shared a bedroom in the basement. At some point during the evening, several members of the household reported hearing their pet Cocker Spaniel barking.

In the early morning hours of August 31, Burr woke her parents in their first-floor bedroom, complaining that Mary was crying. At the time, Mary was healing from a broken arm, which was in a cast. Their mother Beverly recalled soothing Mary before sending both girls back to bed, though she could not determine the time this occurred.

At approximately 5:30 a.m., Beverly realized Burr was missing when they found Mary (who was again crying) alone in the bedroom. The front door of the house, which had been locked, was slightly ajar, while a small window in the living room was open. Grass from the front lawn was found inside the house; an overturned bench was discovered against the side of the residence. Beverly then went door to door, knocking on neighbors doors, asking them had they seen Burr; none of them had. Beverly then returned home, woke up her husband and rang police.

== Investigation ==
=== Initial search efforts ===
Upon searching the house, law enforcement noticed a table of figurines beside the open living-room window was undisturbed, despite the appearance that someone had entered the home this way. A faint footprint was found near the overturned bench outside. Law enforcement estimated the shoe that made the print was likely a Keds sneaker, size six or seven. None of Burr's clothing or other personal items were missing from the home. It was determined that Burr had left the residence wearing only her blue nightgown, and a chain necklace with an engraved medal of the Madonna and Child, a medal of Saint Christopher and an identification tag.

On the morning Burr was reported missing, 100 soldiers from Fort Lewis, as well as fifty members of the National Guard from Camp Murray, aided police in the search for the child. By 11:00 p.m., over 75 square blocks surrounding the Burr residence had been searched, including wooded areas, but no sign of her was found. Additionally, dive teams searched Commencement Bay for signs of Burr, but found nothing. Due to the lack of concrete evidence indicating an abduction had occurred, the FBI only assisted the case on a stand-by basis. A report submitted in the days following the disappearance came from neighbors who heard screaming emanating from a vehicle with California license plates on the morning Burr went missing. However, when the driver of this vehicle was located, they explained that the noise had merely emanated from the radio and was mistaken for screaming.

On September 8, Burr's parents voluntarily took polygraph examinations in response to rumors that they had withheld information in their daughter's disappearance. Both were found to be truthful in their responses. The following day, Burr's maternal grandmother, Mrs. Roy Leach, posted a US$1,000 reward for information leading to the discovery of her granddaughter. The reward was increased to US$5,000 after allocation of additional funds.

Over 1,500 persons were interviewed within the first twelve days of Burr's disappearance. On October 31, law enforcement interviewed 31-year-old Hugh Bion Morse, an ex-Marine and suspect in the 1959 murder of nine-year-old Candy Rogers in Spokane. Police also interviewed Robert Bruzas, a 15-year-old neighbor of the Burrs who had a close friendship with Ann. Bruzas underwent two polygraph examinations, having failed the first one, which he claimed was due to his heightened nerves, with him later passing the second.

In June 1962, an employee at a service station in the Canadian city of Portage la Prairie told law enforcement he saw a girl who appeared to be Burr accompanied by a man and woman who "spoke a little too sharply" to be her parents. The employee claimed the girl mentioned that she was from Tacoma. In the winter of 1964, law enforcement attempted to arrest Ralph Everett Larkee in Portland, Oregon; Larkee had been accused of kidnapping Gay Lynn Stewart, and was considered a possible suspect in Burr's disappearance, but he committed suicide by gunshot before police were able to apprehend him.

=== Potential involvement of Ted Bundy ===
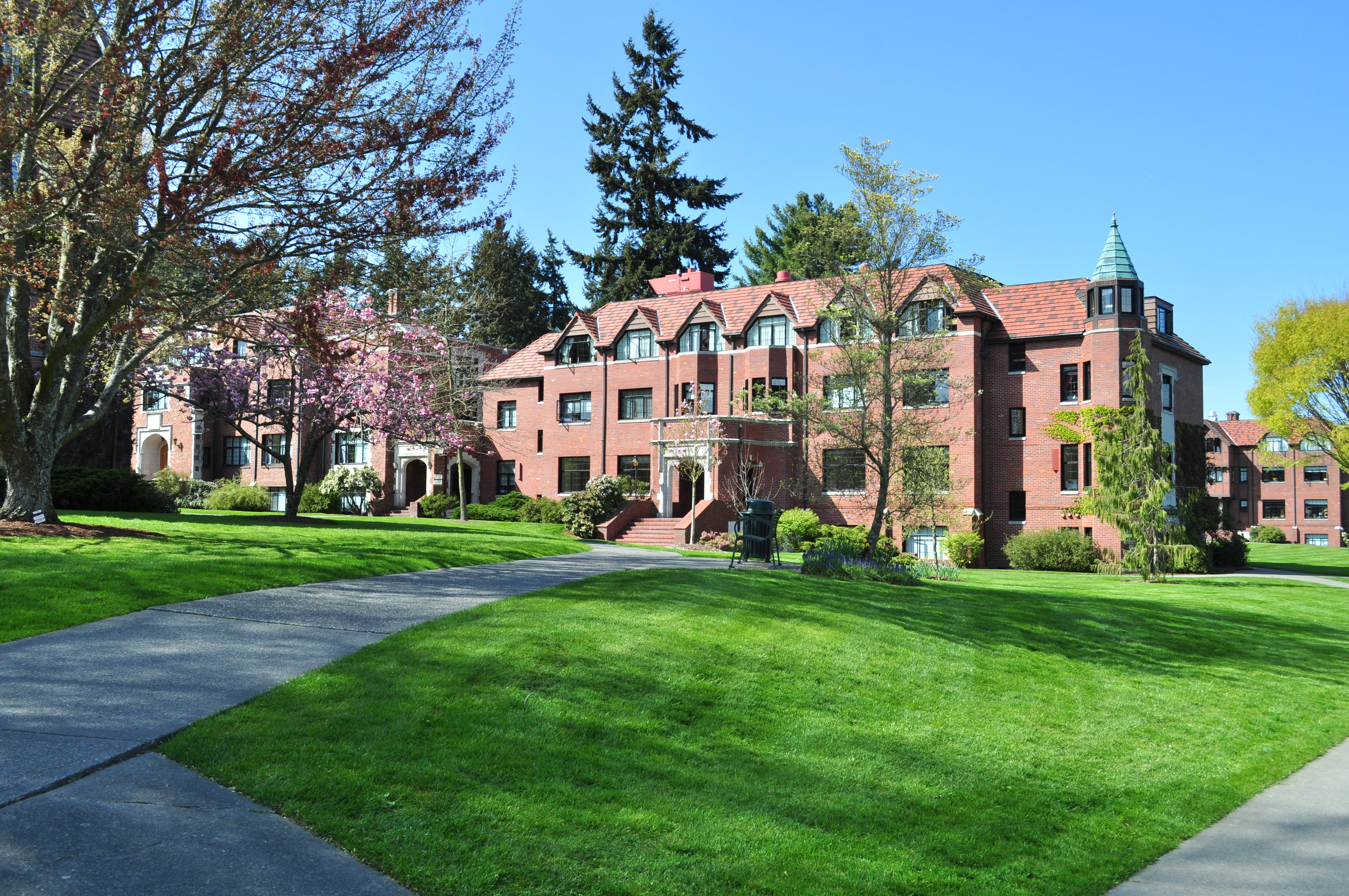
Based on circumstantial evidence, Burr's parents believed she was buried on the University of Puget Sound campus

After serial killer Ted Bundy was apprehended in 1978, he became a suspect in Burr's disappearance when law enforcement discovered he was a resident of Tacoma at the time of her disappearance, then age 14. Bundy had exhibited disturbing and violent behavior growing up in Tacoma, having reportedly built makeshift punji traps around his neighborhood which injured at least one girl. One childhood neighbor of Bundy in Tacoma recalled him as a "mean-spirited kid" who "liked to inflict pain and suffering and fear".

At the time Burr disappeared, Bundy worked as a paperboy and delivered newspapers in the Burrs' neighborhood, with his delivery route crossing near the Burr residence; he also had a great-uncle – whom he often visited – who taught music at the University of Puget Sound (UPS), which was located several blocks from the Burr residence. Bundy would have crossed very near to the Burr residence, as he had to pass 6th Avenue and N. Fife Streets, where the office manager for the route was. The unknown size 6 shoe imprint, found outside the window from which Burr was abducted, was consistent with a teenaged perpetrator.

When questioned in Burr's disappearance, Bundy told law enforcement that he "wouldn't have hurt a little girl" and denied involvement. In 1987, Bundy confided to author Robert D. Keppel that there were "some murders" that he would "never talk about", because they were committed "too close to home", "too close to family" or involved "victims who were very young". Burr's disappearance matched all three of these categories.

Burr's parents told the media at this time that they believed their daughter's body had been buried in excavation sites on the UPS campus, where construction was underway in 1961. However, they claimed neither they nor their daughter knew Bundy. Burr's mother stated that, after two letter exchanges with Bundy while he was on death row, "he avoided the real questions, talking instead about the Green River murders and world events." In one correspondence, Bundy insisted that, in 1961, he was "a normal fourteen-year-old boy. I did not wander the streets late at night. I did not steal cars. I had absolutely no desire to harm anyone." Burr's father later told crime writer Ann Rule that he believed he saw Bundy in a ditch on the UPS campus the morning of his daughter's disappearance.

In 2011, contact evidence from the Burr crime scene was compared to DNA samples of Bundy, but testing failed to link him to the Burr residence due to the fact that a full DNA profile could not be produced from the evidence.

=== Aftermath ===
In July 1963, nearly two years after Burr's disappearance, her parents adopted an infant girl named Laura. Ann Marie Burr's family held a memorial service for her in 1999, 38 years after her disappearance. Donald Burr died in 2003 at age 77. Beverly Burr died of congestive heart failure on September 13, 2008, at her residence in Tacoma.

== See also ==
- List of people who disappeared

== Sources ==
- Keppel, Robert (2010). The Riverman: Ted Bundy and I Hunt for the Green River Killer (Kindle ed.). New York City: Simon & Schuster. ISBN 978-1-4391-9434-8.
- Nordheim, Teresa (2016). Murder & Mayhem in Seattle. Charleston, South Carolina: The History Press. ISBN 978-1-467-13660-0.
- Rule, Ann (2000) [1980]. The Stranger Beside Me. New York: W. W. Norton & Company. ISBN 978-0-393-05029-5.
- Sullivan, Kevin M. (2009). The Bundy Murders: A Comprehensive History. Jefferson, North Carolina: McFarland. ISBN 978-0-786-44426-7.
