= David Stanley Jacubanis =

American bank robber (1910–1985)

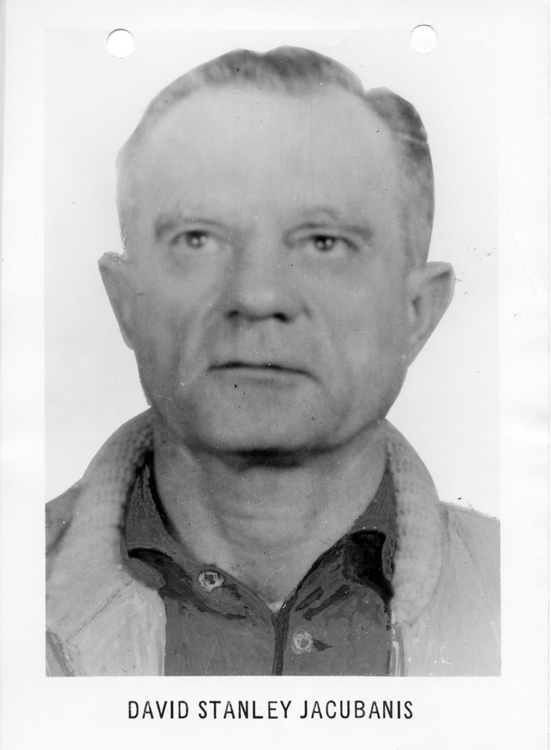

FBI Ten Most Wanted Fugitive
- Charges: Armed robbery
- Alias: David Stanley Jacobanis

Description
- Born: July 8, 1910; Baku, Azerbaijan
- Died: June 23, 1985 (aged 74)

Status
- Added: November 21, 1962
- Caught: November 29, 1962
- Number: 171
- Captured

David Stanley Jacubanis, surname sometimes spelled Jacobanis (July 8, 1910 – June 23, 1985), was a Russian-American criminal and former member of the FBI's Ten Most Wanted list as he was placed on the list as number 171.

== Background ==
Jacubanis was born in Baku, and was mainly a drifter whose criminal career spanned thirty-seven years with convictions including breaking and entering, larceny, auto theft, armed robbery and carrying a gun without a license. Considered an escape risk by several prisons where he would be imprisoned, among them Alcatraz, Jacubanis was described by federal agents as "a man without a country"; Jacubanis was rejected for deportation by Russia, Canada, England, and France.

In 1962, shortly after being paroled, Jacubanis robbed $6,004 from a bank in Dedham, Massachusetts, on March 27, 1962. Because the bank was not insured by the federal government, thus remaining under jurisdiction of state officials, federal authorities issued arrest warrants for Jacubanis with unlawful flight to avoid prosecution and violation of his parole.

== Arrest and capture ==
After a second robbery in North Smithfield, Rhode Island, on April 5, Jacubanis faced additional federal charges and was officially placed as the 171st fugitive on the FBI's Ten Most Wanted List on November 21. After eight days, Jacubanis was captured in Arlington, Vermont, where he was taken back to Massachusetts for trial and eventual conviction.

== Books ==
- Newton, Michael. Encyclopedia of Robbers, Heists, and Capers. New York: Facts on File Inc., 2002.
