= Charles Lee Herron =

American criminal

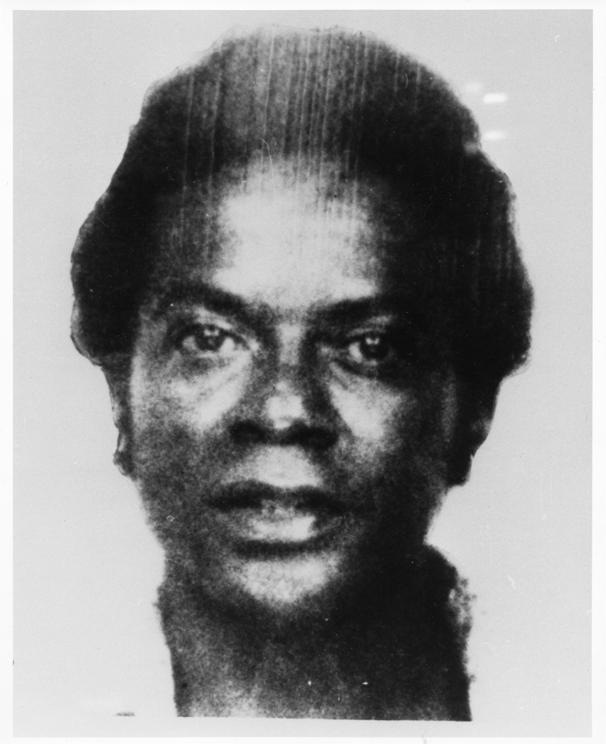

FBI Ten Most Wanted Fugitive

Description
- Born: April 21, 1937; Covington, Kentucky, U.S.
- Died: January 6, 2014 (aged 76); United States

Status
- Added: February 9, 1968
- Caught: June 18, 1986
- Number: 265
- Captured

Charles Lee Herron (April 21, 1937 – January 6, 2014) was an American criminal who featured on the FBI Top Ten Wanted list. He was arrested in 1986 in connection with a 1968 shooting of two police officers.

== Police murders and arrest ==
Herron was an advocate of the black power movement. In January 1968, while racial tensions in Nashville, Tennessee, were strenuous, he was involved in the fatal shootings of two police officers. Officer Thomas Johnson died instantly from a 30-30 rifle, while officer Charles Thomasson died three months later from his wounds after they were called to investigate five black men parked in a dead end street. Four of the men were suspected in a money order scheme. Herron was arrested 18 years later in Jacksonville, Florida, when police staked out his home.

He was arrested alongside one of his four accomplices, William Garrin Allen, who was also on the FBI Ten Most Wanted list. He had escaped prison for the same murders where he was sentenced for 99 years. Herron was subsequently interrogated and he told officers he had actually been arrested in 1975 for a fake license in Atlanta, Georgia, but was not recognized. In 1987, Herron, who was not believed to have fired the fatal shots, pleaded guilty to two counts of voluntary manslaughter and was sentenced to two years in prison. After a federal jury deadlocked 11–1 in favor of a conviction, Herron also pleaded guilty to unlawful flight to avoid prosecution in federal court. In September 1987, he was sentenced to two years in federal prison.
