= Murders of Anthony Palmisano and Edwin R. Woodriffe =

1969 murders of FBI Agents in Washington, D.C.

On January 8, 1969, FBI Special Agents Anthony Palmisano and Edwin R. Woodriffe were shot and killed in Washington, D.C. while attempting to apprehend escaped federal prisoner, Billie Austin Bryant. Woodriffe was the first African-American FBI agent killed in the line of duty. In 2019, the FBI and the city of New York honored Special Agent Woodriffe with a street renaming ceremony, recognizing his service and sacrifice. Both Woodriffe and Palmisano were added to the FBI Wall of Honor.

== Murders and aftermath ==
Billie Austin Bryant
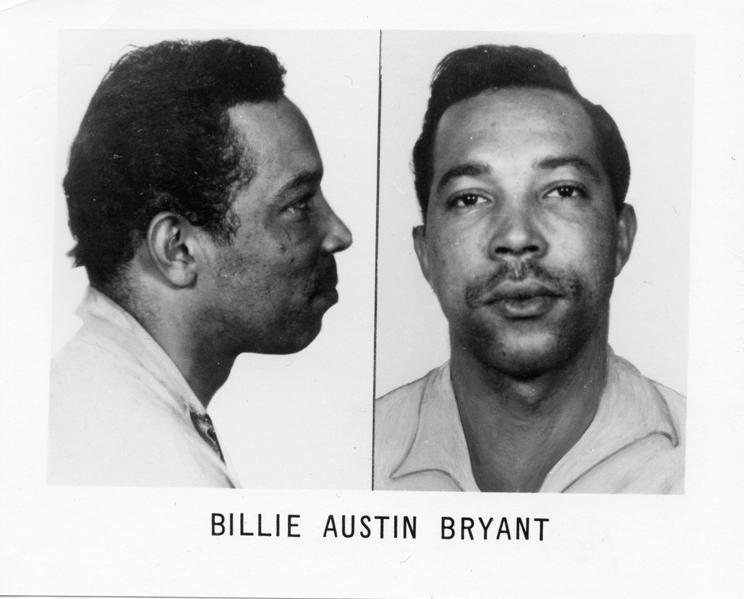

FBI Ten Most Wanted Fugitive

Status
- Convictions: Armed Robbery 7x; Assault; Escape; First degree murder 2x
- Penalty: Combined: 97 years plus 2 life sentences, all concurrent
- Added: January 8, 1969
- Caught: January 8, 1969
- Number: 295
- Captured

On August 23, 1968, Bryant escaped from the District of Columbia Department of Corrections Reformatory in Lorton, Virginia, by using a car he was working on in the automobile shop to drive through a temporary fence at the prison. At the time of his escape, he was serving up to 54 years for armed robbery and assault. On January 8, 1969, the Citizens Bank and Trust Company of Maryland in Fort Washington was robbed by a man who escaped in a maroon Cadillac. Two of the tellers were able to identify Bryant as the robber because he was a customer prior to being in prison. Agents knew that Bryant's wife lived in an apartment in the Southeast side of Washington D.C. A search of the area turned up no leads on Bryant's whereabouts. Special Agents Palmisano, Woodriffe, and a third agent attempted to contact the wife at the apartment. Upon knocking at the door, an individual told them the woman they were looking for was not there and refused entry to the agents when they asked if they could wait. The individual then opened fire through the door striking Palmisano and Woodriffe while the third agent returned fire. Woodriffe and Palmisano were rushed by ambulance to a nearby hospital, where they were pronounced dead on arrival.

D.C. Metropolitan Police and the FBI surrounded the building, but after a siege of the apartment, it was found that the suspect had fled through a window using a nearby tree. The third agent identified Bryant as the suspect and an all-out manhunt ensued. He was subsequently charged with bank robbery and murder and placed on the FBI Ten Most Wanted Fugitives List as #295.

At 6:50 p.m., around 2 hours after the shootings, the D.C. Metropolitan Police received a call from a concerned citizen about noises in his attic on Mississippi Avenue, only four blocks away from Bryant's apartment. A robbery detective arrived and after announcing himself, Bryant called for help from the attic as he had trapped himself.

He was arrested and later wrote a full confession but stated he fired in self defense. He was on the Most Wanted List for only 2 hours, the shortest time in history, until 2026. On January 28, 1969, the third FBI agent identified Bryant in a police line-up. On April 10, 1969, he was convicted of escaping from federal prison and sentenced to three years. On April 14, 1969, he was convicted of armed robbery and sentenced to 20 years.

During his trial, the jury could not decide whether he should be sentenced to death or life in prison, leaving it up to the judge to decide. Bryant showed no remorse, stating, "I can't say I'm sorry for what happened to these men (the FBI agents) ... I am really not interested in what the sentence is one way or another." On November 3, 1969, he was convicted of two counts of first degree murder and received two life sentences, one for each agent. Judge Gerhard Gesell told Bryant that he "would die in jail, but at the time God so appoints."

Bryant died in prison on March 10, 2009, at the age of 69.

== Special Agent Anthony Palmisano ==
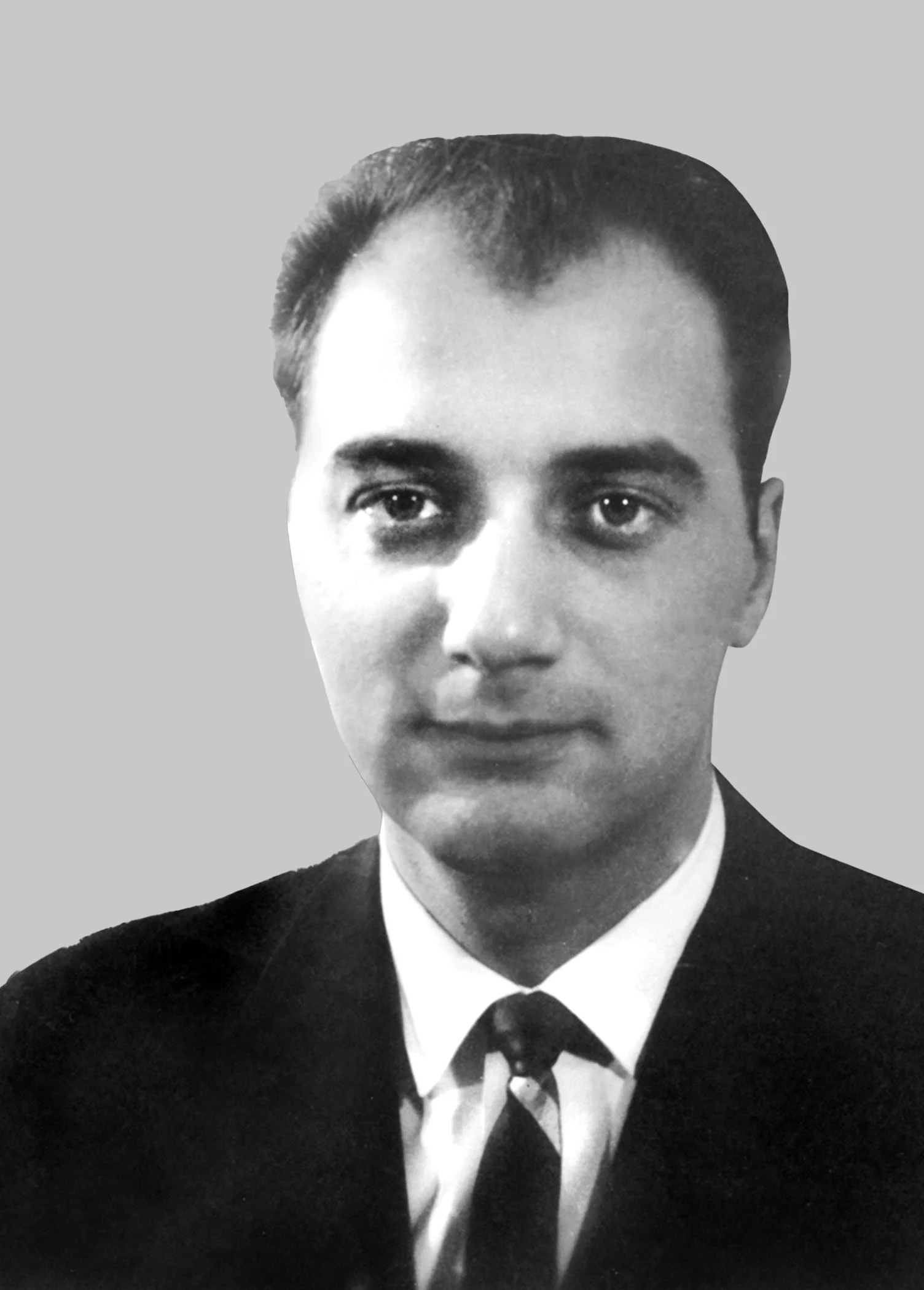
Anthony Palmisano FBI Wall of Honor Photo from 1967

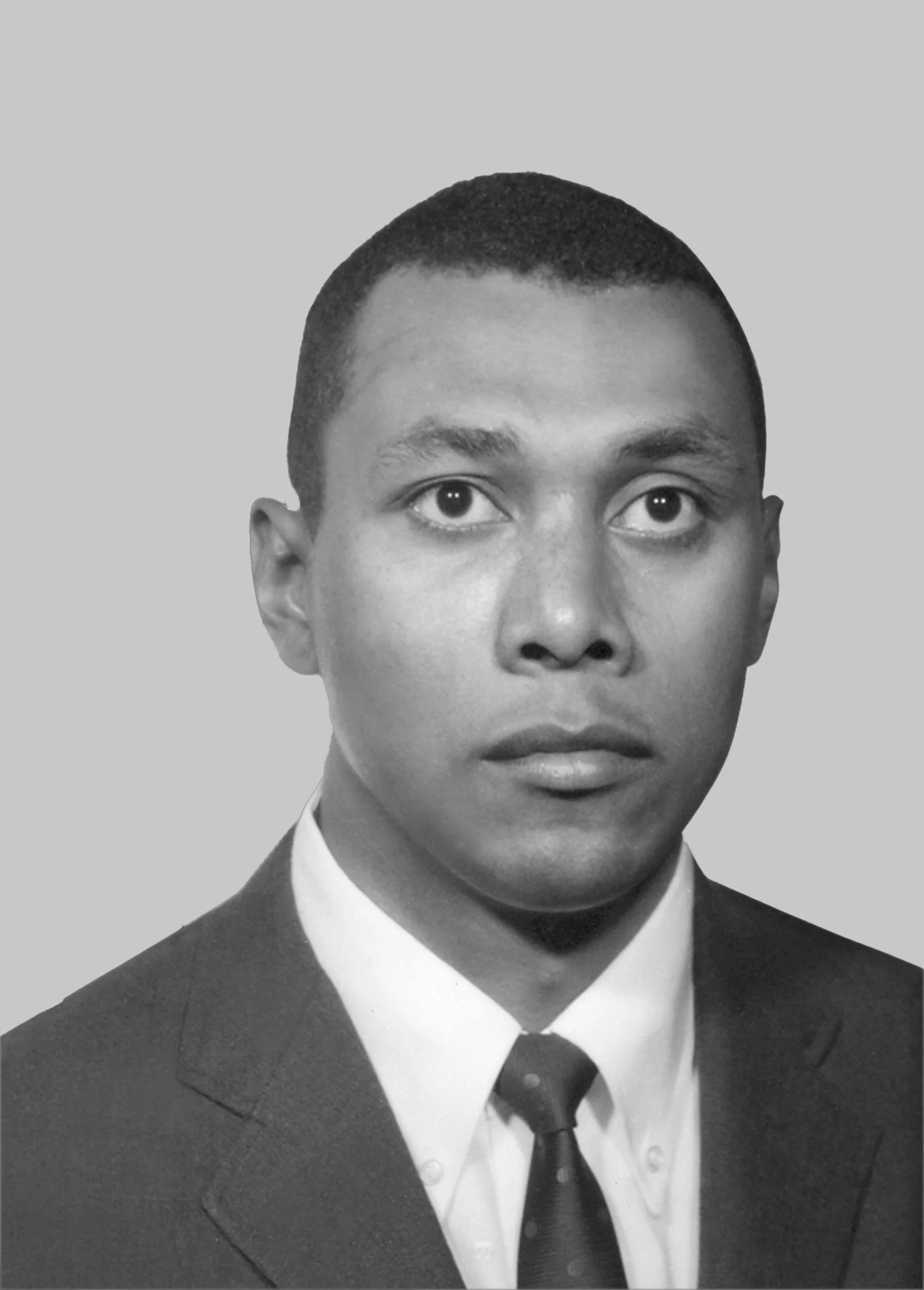
Edwin R. Woodriffe FBI Wall of Honor Photo from 1968

Palmisano was born in Newark, New Jersey on November 3, 1942. He began working for the FBI as a clerk at the Newark Field Office on June 17, 1960. At the same time, he was earning a degree from Seton Hall College where he later received a B.S. Degree in Business Administration. He entered active duty as a special agent on July 10, 1967, and transferred from the Charlotte field office to the Washington, D.C. field office in 1968.

On January 8, 1969, he was shot and killed by Bryant while pursuing him for escaping prison. He served the FBI as a Special Agent for only one year before his death at 28. For his sacrifice, he was added to the FBI Wall of Honor.

== Special Agent Edwin R. Woodriffe ==
Woodriffe was born in Brooklyn, New York on January 22, 1941. He was the third child of immigrants from Trinidad who owned a dry cleaning shop in the Bedford-Stuyvesant neighborhood. He looked up to his older brother, William Woodriffe, who was a New York City police officer. While earning a degree in Accounting from Fordham University in New York he also worked as a part time police-cadet as a clerk and worked for the United States Department of the Treasury as a criminal investigator. After graduating from Fordham in 1962, he married Ella Louise Moore, whom he had met in a Christian confirmation class as a teenager. They had two children, Lee Ann and Edwin R. Woodriffe Jr. He later accepted an appointment as a special agent with the FBI on May 22, 1967, and was assigned to the Cleveland field office. In February 1968, he transferred to the field office in Washington, D.C. He was a rising star in the bureau.

On January 8, 1969, he was shot and killed by Billie Austin Bryant while pursuing him for escaping prison at the age of 27. For his sacrifice, he was added to the FBI Wall of Honor.

He was described as professional and courteous towards suspects and had a great sense of humor. As only one of the handful of black agents at the time he was revered with agent Robert Quigley stating about Woodriffe's talents, "there is no doubt in my mind that [he] would've been one of the top FBI executives had he lived,".

FBI Special Agent Edwin R. Woodriffe Way in Brooklyn, New York

His daughter, Lee Woodriffe, tried convincing the New York city council to rename Jefferson Avenue and Claver Place in Bedford-Stuyvesant to FBI Special Agent Edwin R. Woodriffe Way. The intersection is home to the St. Peter Claver Church, where he was an altar boy. However, she was met with heavy pushback from anti-Catholic activists. After two years, on April 26, 2019, it was formally christened. The ceremony was attended by FBI agents, New York City police, city officials, clergy, friends, and the family of Woodriffe.

Lee would go on to write a book about her father, detailing his life and murder in an effort to ensure his legacy called Memorial Star: The story of Edwin R. Woodriffe, the first African-American FBI agent killed in the line of duty.
