= Taylor Morris Teaford =

American fugitive (born 1935)

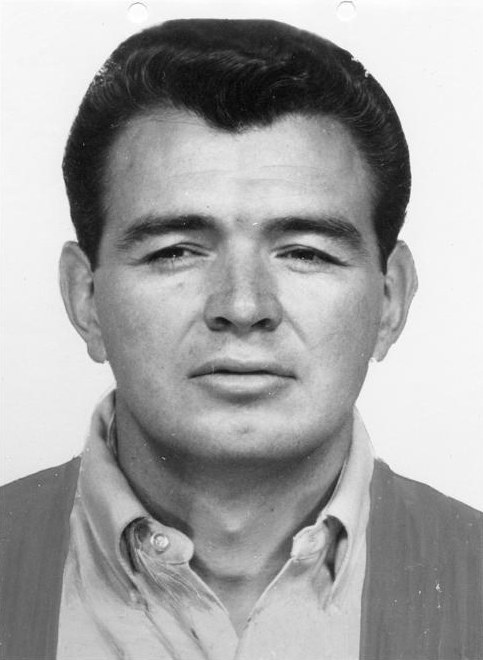
- Photograph taken 1967

FBI Ten Most Wanted Fugitive
- Charges: Unlawful Flight to Avoid Prosecution; Murder
- Alias: Morris Teaford; Taylor Melvin Teaford; Melvin Teaford

Description
- Born: June 18, 1935; North Fork, California, U.S.
- Nationality: American
- Gender: Male
- Height: 6 ft 0 in (1.83 m)
- Weight: 170 lb (77 kg)–175 lb (79 kg)

Status
- Added: May 10, 1968
- Removed: May 24, 1972
- Number: 279
- Removed from Top Ten Fugitive List

Taylor Morris Teaford (born June 18, 1935) is an American fugitive and suspected serial killer who was added to the FBI Ten Most Wanted Fugitives list in 1968. Teaford was last seen after shooting his grandmother to death as well as wounding his sister and another individual. In 1972, despite not being captured, he was charged for the 1969 murder of a teenage girl who was strangled in a hotel room in Oakland, California. Teaford was also suspected of committing additional murders of women in Northern California.

Teaford was described by the FBI on his wanted poster to be "strong physically," proficient at firearms use, and to have an "explosive" temper. He was also said to drink alcohol heavily and abuse narcotics. Acquaintances described Teaford as also being addicted to BDSM. Teaford was removed from the list in 1972 when federal process against him was dismissed, but he remains a fugitive from justice.

== Early life ==
Taylor Teaford was born on June 18, 1935, in North Fork, California and was raised by his grandmother due to his parents' separation. Of American Indian descent, he was afflicted with polio at the age of 13 which caused him to walk with a limp to his right leg. Teaford dropped out of school in the ninth grade; his criminal record began as a juvenile, when he was charged with theft and reckless driving at the Fresno County Juvenile Court. He was also imprisoned in 1957 on a rape charge and in 1955 for burglary.

== Criminal history ==
=== Murder of Pearl Teaford ===
On the evening of July 18, 1967, 39-year-old Charles Culpepper was driving with his mother in North Fork, California when Teaford's 26-year-old injured sister, Cheri Macintosh, flagged them down and told them that her brother was trying to kill her. Charles got out of his vehicle before being fired at six times with a handgun. Despite being hit once in his right arm, Charles managed to get Teaford's sister into his car and they drove off to a local county hospital. According to Macintosh, Teaford had been drinking heavily before getting into an extreme rage and shooting to death his 72-year-old grandmother, Pearl Morris Teaford, with a .22 calibre pistol at around midnight.

She had been shot once in the eye and had been killed along with two of her cats. Macintosh's 9-year-old daughter, Cathy Macintosh, was present in the ranch house residence at the time and ran to a nearby neighbour's home shortly after the murder occurred. Teaford then exchanged fire with law enforcement before escaping into the Yosemite National Park. Teaford was subsequently sought in a manhunt and was added to the FBI Ten Most Wanted Fugitives list on May 10, 1968, on a warrant for unlawful flight to avoid prosecution.

=== Murder of Joanne Yvonne Burdick ===
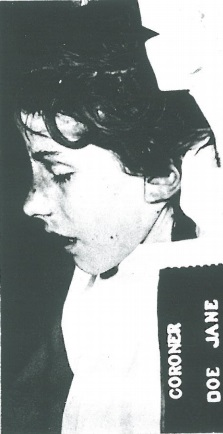
Morgue photograph of the formerly unidentified female Teaford was accused of killing in 1969.

A then unidentified white female entered Room 15 of the St. Louis Hotel located on 7th Street in Oakland, California, which is now the site of the North Alameda County Jail, with a man later identified by witnesses as Teaford on October 2, 1969. He beat her and then strangled her with an article of her own clothing. She was discovered deceased 24-hours-later. The victim died from blunt force trauma and was originally speculated to have been a prostitute, although her identity could not be determined during the course of the original investigation. In 1972, Teaford was charged with the murder.

In October 2026, it was announced that the victim had been identified by the Alameda County Coroner's Office through DNA testing as Joanne Yvonne Burdick, a 16-year-old girl, with assistance from the Federal Bureau of Investigation and the Oakland Police Department Homicide Cold Case Unit.

=== The Crew Cut Killer ===
On April 10, 1969, six months prior to the death of Burdick, a body of a dead woman was found on a dirt road located beside the Oakland Estuary. The victim's head and face had been crushed with a 30-pound slab of concrete and she was later identified by fingerprints as 22-year-old sex worker Judith Lattaker. Four months later on August 3, 1969, the body of 27-year-old Alma Fay Dorough was recovered from Berkeley Aquatic Park. She had been beaten and stabbed to death and also had a criminal record for prostitution. Authorities linked the two murders with the subsequent homicide of Burdick in October and dubbed the suspected perpetrator as "The Crew Cut Killer". When Teaford was identified as a prime suspect in the murder of Burdick, he was also established as a person of interest in the unsolved deaths of Lattaker and Dorough.

== See also ==
- List of fugitives from justice who disappeared
