= FBI Ten Most Wanted Fugitives, 1970s =

The FBI's Ten Most Wanted Fugitives during the 1970s is a list, maintained for a third decade, of the Ten Most Wanted Fugitives of the United States Federal Bureau of Investigation.

== FBI headlines in the 1970s ==
As a decade, the 1970s are marked by the passing of the Hoover era. J. Edgar Hoover had formed and defined the Bureau for nearly a half century. He was succeeded by a long list of short-term directors throughout the Nixon – Ford – Carter era who could not match Hoover's larger persona. Eventually, Director William H. Webster brought stability to Bureau, during the President Reagan era.

On the 1970s top 10 list, perhaps the most notable is the 2nd appearance of James Earl Ray, in 1977. Additionally, in 1971 the list was completely filled with long-time fugitives, who persistently evaded capture, leading to the very first year in which the FBI found it impractical to add any new fugitives to the top ten list. In 1970, the FBI had packed the list with an extraordinary number of "Special Additions" of whom most evaded capture. Consequently, the 1971 list opened with a total of sixteen wanted fugitives at large, nearly twice as many as would typically appear on the list at any other given time. By the end of the year 1971, three of the listed wanted fugitives had been captured, bringing the opening 1972 list down to a still extraordinarily large number of thirteen fugitives. Due to further removals from the list in 1972, the FBI found justification to finally list a single new Fugitive late that year.

== FBI Ten Most Wanted Fugitives to begin the 1970s ==
The FBI in the past has identified individuals by the sequence number in which each individual has appeared on the list. Some individuals have even appeared twice, and often a sequence number was permanently assigned to an individual suspect who was soon caught, captured, or simply removed, before his or her appearance could be published on the publicly released list. In those cases, the public would see only gaps in the number sequence reported by the FBI. For convenient reference, the wanted suspect's sequence number and date of entry on the FBI list appear below, whenever possible.

As the decade began, the following fugitives were the FBI's Ten Most Wanted:

Name	Sequence Number	Date of Entry	Notes
John William Clouser	#203	1965	• Dropped from the list August 1, 1972, later surrendered to authorities on August 21, 1974
Charles Lee Herron	#265	1968	• Arrested in June 1986
Taylor Morris Teaford	#279	1968	• Dropped from the list May 24, 1972
Byron James Rice	#282	1968	• Apprehended October 2, 1972
Warren David Reddock	#298	1969	• Arrested April 14, 1971
Cameron David Bishop	#300	1969	• Arrested in Rhode Island March 12, 1975
Marie Dean Arrington	#301	1969	• Arrested in New Orleans, December 22, 1971. Died in prison in 2014. • Arrington was the second woman to appear on the list since the list began.
Benjamin Hoskins Paddock	#302	1969	• Bank robber, appeared on the list after escaping prison. Dropped from the list on May 5, 1977, captured in 1978. He was the father of the Las Vegas shooter, Stephen Paddock.
Joseph Lloyd Thomas	#304	1969	• Arrested March 8, 1970

The tenth space had just opened up at the end of the year 1969, but was promptly filled by a new individual on the list in the first week of 1970.

== FBI Ten Most Wanted Fugitives added during the 1970s ==
The most wanted fugitives listed in the decade of the 1970s include (in FBI list appearance sequence order):

=== 1970 ===
Name	Sequence Number	Date of Entry	Time Listed
James John Byrnes	#305	January 6, 1970	Three months
James John Byrnes escaped custody in Kansas and was wanted for kidnapping two people and stealing a plane. He was arrested in Huntington Beach, California on April 17, 1970.
Edmund James Devlin	#306	March 6, 1970	Five months
Edmund James Devlin was the leader of a gang of bank robbers and was wanted for his involvement in a Norwalk, Connecticut bank robbery where he made off with $106,333. He was arrested in Manchester, New Hampshire on August 15, 1970.
Lawrence Robert Plamondon	#307	May 5, 1970	Two months
Lawrence Robert Plamondon was wanted after fleeing his indictment for his involvement in the bombing of a CIA office in Ann Arbor, Michigan, on September 29, 1968. He is a co-founder of the White Panther Party and its Minister of Defense. He was arrested in Mackinac County, Michigan on July 23, 1970, after being stopped by state police when an occupant of his van threw a can out of the window. A license plate check through the NCIC identified Plamondon.
Hubert Geroid Brown	#308	May 6, 1970	One year
Hubert Geroid Brown In 1967, gave a speech in Cambridge, Maryland, where he told the crowd to "burn America down," which resulted in riots and a shooting. After fleeing, he was a target of the FBI's COINTELPRO program. He was captured on October 16, 1971, during an armed robbery in New York City after being seriously wounded in a gunfight with local police.
Angela Yvonne Davis	#309	August 18, 1970	Two months
Angela Yvonne Davis was captured October 13, 1970, at a motel room in New York City. She had fled California and evaded the police for over two months. She was charged in California with conspiracy, kidnapping, and homicide, due to her alleged participation in an escape attempt of George Jackson, a Black Panther Party member, from the Marin County Hall of Justice during his trial, in which the judge, Harold Haley, was shot to death after being taken outside into a van. She was exonerated on all charges in 1972 after being held in a Women's Detention Center in New York City.
Dwight Alan Armstrong	#310	September 4, 1970	Six years
Dwight Alan Armstrong was wanted in connection to the Sterling Hall bombing. He was removed from the list on April 1, 1976, because he no longer met the list criteria. He was eventually arrested in April 1977 and sentenced to 7 years in prison for second degree murder on May 5, 1977. He was paroled in 1980.
Karleton Lewis Armstrong	#311	September 4, 1970	Two years
Karleton Lewis Armstrong was wanted in connection to the Sterling Hall bombing. He was apprehended in Toronto, Ontario February 16, 1972, Canada by the Royal Canadian Mounted Police. He was returned to the United States in March 1973 where he pleaded guilty to second degree murder and arson and sentenced to 23 years in prison, but had his prison sentence reduced and was freed in February 1980.
David Sylvan Fine	#312	September 4, 1970	Six years
David Sylvan Fine was wanted in connection to the Sterling Hall bombing. He was arrested in San Rafael, California on January 8, 1976. He was sentenced to 7 years in prison for second degree murder and eventually released in August 1979.
Leo Frederick Burt	#313	September 4, 1970	Six years
Leo Frederick Burt was removed from the list on April 7, 1976, because he no longer met the list criteria. Burt has not been captured and is still at large with state charges still pending against him in connection to the Sterling Hall bombing.
Bernardine Rae Dohrn	#314	October 14, 1970	Three years
Bernardine Rae Dohrn was wanted in connection to activities associated with the Weatherman group. The process was dismissed on December 7, 1973.
Katherine Ann Power	#315	October 17, 1970	Fourteen years
Katherine Ann Power alongside Susan Edith Saxe (#316), was wanted for robbing a series of banks. One lead to the death of a police officer, where she drove the getaway car. She was removed from the list on June 15, 1984, because she no longer met the list criteria, but surrendered to authorities in 1993. She pleaded guilty and was imprisoned in Massachusetts for six years before being released on 14-years' probation.
Susan Edith Saxe	#316	October 17, 1970	Five years
Susan Edith Saxe was wanted for a series of bank robberies with Katherine Ann Power (#315) to fund anti-government movements during the Vietnam war. She was arrested in Philadelphia on March 27, 1975, after a Philadelphia officer recognized her from a photo distributed by the FBI the same day.

=== 1971 ===
No one was added to the list in 1971.

=== 1972 ===
Name	Sequence Number	Date of Entry	Time Listed
Mace Brown	#317	October 20, 1972	Six months
Mace Brown, a hired killer, was wanted for the escaping prison with seven others while on death row in Washington, D.C. for shooting a witness in the head in connection to a drug case. He was killed by police officers in a bank robbery shootout in New York City on April 18, 1973, during which the bank robbers took hostages.

=== 1973 ===
Name	Sequence Number	Date of Entry	Time Listed
Herman Bell	#318	May 9, 1973	Four months
Herman Bell, was wanted for the murders of officers Joseph A. Piagentini and Waverly M. Jones, when he and two others ambushed and fatally shot them in the back, outside a housing project in Harlem on May 21, 1971. They cited their ongoing war with the United States as members of the Black Liberation Army as their reasoning for the murders. He was arrested in New Orleans on September 2, 1973, by the FBI and local officers.
Twymon Ford Myers	#319	September 28, 1973	Two months
Twymon Ford Myers, a member of the Black Liberation Army, was wanted for the non-fatal shootings of four New York police officers and a robbery. He was killed in the Bronx, New York on November 14, 1973, during a shootout with the FBI and the New York Police Department.
Ronald Harvey	#320	December 7, 1973	Three months
Ronald Harvey was wanted in connection for the murder of Major B. Saxon and six others, which included five children, when he failed to show for a line up. The motive was believed to be a dispute between two Muslim sects in Washington. He was arrested in Chicago on March 27, 1974.
Samuel Richard Christian	#321	December 7, 1973	Five days
Samuel Richard Christian, founder of the Philadelphia Black Mafia, was wanted for his connection to the murder of Major B. Saxon and six others, as well as the 1972 murder of Tyrone "Fat Ty" Palmer. He was arrested in Detroit on December 12, 1973.

=== 1974 ===
Name	Sequence Number	Date of Entry	Time Listed
Rudolph Alonza Turner	#322	January 10, 1974	Nine months
Rudolph Alonza Turner was wanted for running a kidnapping and armed robbery scheme where he shot and killed a responding police lieutenant. He was arrested in Jacksonville, Florida on October 1, 1974, by FBI agents.
Larry Gene Cole	#323	April 2, 1974	One day
Larry Gene Cole was wanted for kidnapping a real estate agent alongside his wife and demanded a $25,000 ransom from the victim's husband who he worked for. They were apprehended near Buffalo, New York on April 3, 1974. When Cole was first approached, he claimed to be part of the Special Investigation, Department of Justice.
James Ellsworth Jones	#324	April 2, 1974	Two months
James Ellsworth Jones was wanted for the kidnapping of Leland Norris Davenport from a gas station Mint Springs, just off highway I-81. Though Davenport was later found murdered, Jones was not charged with his murder, but rather his kidnapping. He was arrested in Coral Gables, Florida June 15, 1974, after an off-duty police officer recognized Jones from an FBI Wanted Notice in the police department.
Lendell Hunter	#325	June 27, 1974	One month
Lendell Hunter was wanted for escaping prison while serving three sentences for the rape and a murder of a 78-year-old woman and an assault of her 12-year-old grandson in Augusta, Georgia. He was arrested in Des Moines, Iowa on July 31, 1974.
John Edward Copeland	#326	August 15, 1974	One year
John Edward Copeland was wanted for a series of rapes in California. He was arrested in Dorchester, Massachusetts on July 23, 1975, after riding his bicycle home due to citizen cooperation,.
Melvin Dale Walker	#327	October 16, 1974	Three weeks
Melvin Dale Walker was wanted for escaping prison in Pennsylvania while serving time for bank robbery. He was apprehended in Virginia Beach, Virginia on November 9, 1974, after entering a house staked out by agents on the inside and outside of the house. He attempted to escape by car but was arrested.
Thomas Otis Knight	#328	December 12, 1974	Two weeks
Thomas Otis Knight was a convicted murderer who escaped the Miami-Dade County Jail with ten other prisoners on September 19, 1974. He was arrested in New Smyrna Beach, Florida on December 31, 1974. Though heavily armed and barricaded behind a door in a rooming house, he was overwhelmed by the FBI SWAT Team. He was executed by lethal injection in Florida on January 7, 2014.

=== 1975 ===
Name	Sequence Number	Date of Entry	Time Listed
Billy Dean Anderson	#329	January 21, 1975	Four years
Billy Dean Anderson was wanted for escaping the Morgan County Jail with another inmate while serving time for shooting a deputy. He was killed in Pall Mall, Tennessee on July 7, 1979, during a shootout with police. The lead was based on information from an informant known as "Mountain Man."
Robert Gerald Davis	#330	April 4, 1975	Two years
Robert Gerald Davis was wanted in connection to two shootings. One of the shootings took place during a grocery store robbery where five people were injured and a 13-year-old boy was shot to death in Camden, New Jersey. Two days later, another shooting took place where a police officer was shot in Pittsburgh, Pennsylvania. He was arrested in Venice, California on August 5, 1977.
Richard Dean Holtan	#331	April 18, 1975	Three months
Richard Dean Holtan was wanted for armed robbery and murder in Omaha, Nebraska after he robbed a local bar. He forced the bartender and two patrons into a bathroom, shooting the bartender, killing him, while wounding a patron. He was arrested by local authorities in Kauai, Hawaii on July 12, 1975.
Richard Bernard Lindhorst Jr.	#332	August 4, 1975	Three days
Richard Bernard Lindhorst Jr. was wanted for robbing Farmers Savings Bank in Wever, Iowa. He was arrested in Pensacola, Florida on August 7, 1975, by FBI agents and local police.
William Lewis Herron Jr.	#333	August 15, 1975	Two months
William Lewis Herron Jr., a professional killer, pleaded guilty to shooting Robert Bussen in the head and killing St. Charles Sherriff Lieutenant, Albert H. Musterman. He was later charged with kidnapping and escape when he escaped Kentucky State Prison and tied a guard to a tree. He was arrested in Peoria, Illinois on October 30, 1975.
James Winston Smallwood	#334	August 29, 1975	Four months
James Winston Smallwood was one of three men who held up the Maryland Bank and Trust Company in Lexington Park, Maryland, on May 19, 1975. He was arrested in Landover, Maryland on December 5, 1975, after being located in the trunk of a vehicle used in a bank robbery in Maryland.
Leonard Peltier	#335	December 22, 1975	Two months
Leonard Peltier become an infamous cause célèbre of the American Indian Movement (AIM), for alleged irregularities in his trial. He was arrested February 6, 1976, in Hinton, Alberta, Canada by Royal Canadian Mounted Police. He was convicted in 1977 and sentenced to two consecutive terms of life imprisonment for the execution-style murders of two FBI agents.

=== 1976 ===
Name	Sequence Number	Date of Entry	Time Listed
Patrick James Huston	#336	March 3, 1976	One year
Patrick James Huston escaped a lower Manhattan prison with five others while awaiting trial for bank robbery. He was arrested in Fort Lauderdale, Florida on December 7, 1977.
Thomas Edward Bethea	#337	March 5, 1976	Two months
Thomas Edward Bethea was wanted with seven others for their involvement in the kidnapping of Washington truck executive, Alan Lewis Bortnick, where they demanded a $250,000 ransom. He was arrested in the Bahamas on May 5, 1976, by Bahamian authorities. He was transferred into FBI custody upon his arrival in Miami.
Anthony Michael Juliano	#338	March 15, 1976	One week
Anthony Michael Juliano was part of a bank robbing duo called the "Mutt and Jeff" team who were responsible for 38 bank robberies in the 1970s. He was arrested and fled after violating his parole when he obtained a .380 handgun. He was arrested in Mecklenburg County, Virginia on March 22, 1976, after a meter maid recognized him in a parked car.
Joseph Maurice McDonald	#339	April 1, 1976	Six years
Joseph Maurice McDonald, a contract killer for the Winter Hill Gang, was wanted for dozens of crimes, which included multiple murders, witness intimidation, fraud schemes, and mob ties to James "Whitey" Bulger. He was arrested at Penn Station in New York City on September 15, 1982, by local police.
James Ray Renton	#340	April 7, 1976	One year
James Ray Renton was wanted for escaping prison, along with three others, where he was serving a life sentence for kidnapping and killing a police officer. He was also wanted for parole violation from a conviction of robbing a post office and forging Canadian bonds. He was arrested in Aurora, Colorado on May 9, 1977.
Nathaniel Doyle Jr.	#341	April 29, 1976	Three months
Nathaniel Doyle Jr. was wanted for a bank robbery. He was killed in a shootout with local police in Seattle on July 15, 1976.
Morris Lynn Johnson	#342	May 25, 1976	One month
Morris Lynn Johnson was wanted after escaping an Selma, Alabama prison where he was serving time for bank robbery and other numerous crimes. He was taken into custody in New Orleans on June 26, 1976, after trying to run away along a canal bank.
Richard Joseph Picariello	#343	July 29, 1976	Three months
Richard Joseph Picariello was wanted for bank robbery and a series of bombings across New England as part of a self-titled radical prison reform group called the Fred Hampton Unit of the People's Forces. He was arrested in Fall River, Massachusetts on October 21, 1976.
Edward Patrick Gullion	#344	August 13, 1976	Two months
Edward Patrick Gullion was wanted for bank robbery and a series of bombings across New England as part of a self-titled radical prison reform group called the Fred Hampton Unit of the People's Forces. He was arrested in Providence, Rhode Island on October 22, 1976, where he was employed at a jewelry store.
Gerhardt Julius Schwartz	#345	November 18, 1976	Four days
Gerhardt Julius Schwartz was wanted for attempted murder and armed bank robbery with two accomplices. Later, he stabbed one of the accomplices and left him for dead after they robbed a supermarket. He was arrested in the Bronx section of New York City on November 22, 1976, after the police received a tip from a telephone call from New Rochelle, New York.
Francis John Martin	#346	December 17, 1976	Two months
Francis John Martin was wanted for escaping Delaware State Prison with three others while serving a sentence for armed kidnapping and rape. He was arrested in Newport Beach, California on February 17, 1977, after a tip from a telephone call.

=== 1977 ===
Name	Sequence Number	Date of Entry	Time Listed
Benjamin George Pavan	#347	January 12, 1977	One month
Benjamin George Pavan was wanted for armed robbery. He was arrested in Seattle on February 17, 1977, after a tip from a telephone call.
Larry Gene Campbell	#348	March 18, 1977	Six months
Larry Gene Campbell was released from Fishkill Correctional Facility on December 19, 1975, and enrolled as a student at the Buffalo State University. Under the program, he was sponsored by a professor and lived in a dorm with the professor's son where he made several friends. On June 9, 1976, at an apartment one block from the college, Campbell murdered Thomas Tunney, raped and murdered Rhona Eiseman, and stabbed Michael Schostick six times while a fourth friend, Teresa Beynard escaped. Schostick survived his injuries. He was arrested in Atlanta on September 6, 1977, after a neighbor recognized him from a wanted flyer in the local post office.
Roy Ellsworth Smith	#349	March 18, 1977	Three months
Roy Ellsworth Smith was wanted for the murder of two children in Kirkland, Ohio. He was found to have hanged himself in Perry Township, Ohio on June 2, 1977, by the Lake County Sheriff's Department of Painesville, Ohio.
Raymond Luc Levasseur	#350	May 5, 1977	Seven years
Raymond Luc Levasseur is the former leader of the United Freedom Front that committed a series of bombings and bank robberies throughout the United States in protest to US intervention in Central America among other issues. He was arrested in Deerfield, Ohio on November 4, 1984, by FBI agents while traveling in his car with his common-law wife and their three children.
James Earl Ray	#351	June 11, 1977	Two days
James Earl Ray made his second appearance on the list (previously #277, in 1968, for the assassination of Martin Luther King Jr.) after a June 10 escape with 6 other convicts from state prison. He was apprehended not far from the prison in Brushy Mountain, Tennessee, on June 13, 1977. Using bloodhounds, the prison authorities found Ray hiding beneath some leaves in a wooded area.
Willie Foster Sellers	#352	June 14, 1977	Two years
Willie Foster Sellers, the reputed leader of the Dawson Gang, claimed to have robbed more than 100 banks for more than $8 million in the 1970s. He was arrested in Atlanta June 20, 1979, upon his arrival at the Delta Air Lines freight dock.
Larry Smith	#353	July 15, 1977	One month
Larry Smith was wanted for fleeing custody while on parole for armed robbery in Texas. He was also wanted for his connection to a contract killing with two others. He would later testify against the others as a material witness. He was arrested in Toronto, Ontario, Canada on August 20, 1977, by the Metropolitan Toronto Police Force. He was pulled over for illegally driving past a street car's open door. Smith was identified by his fingerprints and delivered to American authorities.
Ralph Robert Cozzolino	#354	October 19, 1977	Three months
Ralph Robert Cozzolino was wanted for the murder of a Chattanooga police officer. He was arrested in Jonesboro, Georgia on January 6, 1978. He was eventually sent to Alcatraz after repeated escape attempts.
Millard Oscar Hubbard	#355	October 19, 1977	Two days
Millard Oscar Hubbard was wanted for armed bank robbery, after he robbed a bank with a pistol and an M16 rifle. He was arrested in Lexington, Kentucky on October 21, 1977, after a tip from locals.
Carlos Alberto Torres	#356	October 19, 1977	Three years
Carlos Alberto Torres was the leader of the FALN, a Puerto Rican, clandestine, paramilitary organization that advocated independence for Puerto Rico that committed nearly 100 bombings in U.S. cities. He was arrested in Evanston, Illinois on April 4, 1980, after a car rental agency reported a stolen van to the police and when locals noticed a suspicious van parked in the neighborhood and contacted the police.
Enrique Estrada	#357	December 5, 1977	Three days
Enrique Estrada was wanted for escaping custody with two others. He was awaiting trial for robbing and beating to death two elderly woman in their home. He was arrested in Bakersfield, California on December 8, 1977, by the Narcotics Task Force of the Kern County Sheriff's Office. Narcotics officers had been following a suspect known as "Hank" and after seeing Wanted Flyers realized he was Estrada.

=== 1978 ===
Name	Sequence Number	Date of Entry	Time Listed
William David Smith	#358	February 10, 1978	Eight months
William David Smith was wanted for bank robbery and the execution-style murder of his ex-wife's husband while on parole. He was arrested in Chicago on October 27, 1978, following a telephone tip.
Gary Ronald Warren	#359	February 10, 1978	Three months
Gary Ronald Warren was wanted after escaping a Florida prison while serving a sentence for bank robbery. He was arrested in Cumberland, Maryland on May 12, 1978, by the FBI and local police.
Theodore Robert Bundy	#360	February 10, 1978	Four days
Theodore Robert Bundy was wanted for escaping from jail twice, once on June 7, 1977, and on December 30, 1977, while being held on a murder charge. He was arrested by local police in Pensacola, Florida on February 15, 1978, after he was stopped for speeding while driving a stolen vehicle, and NCIC came back with a hit. Bundy was executed by electrocution in Florida on January 24, 1989.
Andrew Evan Gipson	#361	March 27, 1978	Two months
Andrew Evan Gipson was wanted for escaping prison where he was serving a term for robbing a bank and getting into a shootout with police in which he shot and killed a state trooper. He was arrested in Albuquerque, New Mexico on May 24, 1978.
Anthony Dominic Liberatore	#362	May 24, 1978	One year
Anthony Dominic Liberatore was a mobster in the Cleveland crime family and who killed Daniel Greene in a bombing, in an effort to take control of the mob scene. He was arrested in Eastlake, Ohio on April 1, 1979, by FBI agents and local police, while he was in bed alone in a house considered "safe" by organized crime in the area.
Michael George Thevis	#363	July 10, 1978	Four months
Michael George Thevis, a.k.a. "The King of Pornography", was wanted for escaping an Indiana jail after he received 14 federal indictments for racketeering that accused him of using murder, extortion and arson to get rid of competitors to his chain of 200 businesses that grossed an estimated $5 million to $10 million a year in the pornography trade. He was arrested in Bloomfield, Connecticut on November 9, 1978, by FBI agents and local police while trying to make a large withdrawal of cash from a bank.
Charles Everett Hughes	#364	November 19, 1978	Three years
Charles Everett Hughes was wanted for the shooting murders of four teenagers who accidentally came across his marijuana smuggling operation in Florida. He then weighed their bodies down with concrete blocks and dropped them into a sinkhole. He was arrested in Myrtle, Mississippi on April 29, 1981, by FBI agents and local police while working in a car repair shop.
Ronald Lee Lyons	#365	December 17, 1978	Nine months
Ronald Lee Lyons was wanted for escaping prison along with three others when out on a recreational trip at a bowling alley. Sawed off shotguns that were hidden in the ceiling were used before the four went on a two-day crime spree where they kidnapped eight people, stole six vehicles, and hijacked a private plane with its pilot. He was arrested in Hungry Valley, Nevada on September 10, 1979, by FBI agents and the Washoe County Sheriff's department.

=== 1979 ===
Name	Sequence Number	Date of Entry	Time Listed
Leo Joseph Koury	#366	April 20, 1979	Twelve years
Leo Joseph Koury was wanted for a slew of crimes including attempted kidnapping, extortion, and mail fraud. He owned several gay bars and was a known thug in The Block using his influence to exploit the gay community. He was found dead in San Diego on June 16, 1991, from massive cerebral vascular hypertension.
John William Sherman	#367	August 3, 1979	Two years
John William Sherman, a former member of the George Jackson Brigade, escaped prison where he was serving time for revolutionary terrorism and bank robbery. He was suspected to be involved in 14 bank robberies and 11 bombings in connection to the terrorist group. He was arrested in Golden, Colorado on December 17, 1981, while he was getting into his car outside his residence.
Melvin Bay Guyon	#368	August 9, 1979	One week
Melvin Bay Guyon was wanted for kidnapping, rape, and armed robbery. On August 9, 1979, he shot and killed Special Agent Johnnie Oliver who was part of a five-member SWAT team tasked with apprehending him. After shooting Oliver, Guyon was placed on the list. He surrendered after a short shootout with FBI agents in Youngstown, Ohio on August 16, 1979, at Southside General Hospital where he was seeking medical attention.
George Alvin Bruton	#369	September 28, 1979	Three months
George Alvin Bruton was wanted for multiple crimes including burglary and the murders of a former prison-mate and their girlfriend, who were involved in a burglary ring. He was a known drug dealer who shot two FBI agents and had taken hostages. He was arrested in Fort Smith, Arkansas on December 14, 1979.
Earl Edwin Austin	#370	October 12, 1979	Five months
Earl Edwin Austin was wanted for a series of bank robberies. He was arrested in his apartment in Tucson, Arizona on March 1, 1980. Upon a his arrest while robbing another bank, he bragged about being a top ten fugitive.
Vincent James Russo	#371	December 24, 1979	Six years
Vincent James Russo, a Marine Sergeant at the time, robbed a liquor store, kidnapped the clerk, took him to a rural area before shooting him execution-style. However, the victim survived. He was arrested at his home in Beaver Falls, Pennsylvania on January 4, 1985.

== End of the decade ==
By the end of the decade, the following fugitives were remaining at large on the FBI's Ten Most Wanted list:

Name	Sequence number	Date of entry
Charles Lee Herron	#265	1968
Katherine Ann Power	#315	1970
Joseph Maurice McDonald	#339	1976
Raymond Luc Levasseur	#350	1977
Carlos Alberto Torres	#356	1977
Charles Everett Hughes	#364	1978
Leo Joseph Koury	#366	1979
John William Sherman	#367	1979
Earl Edwin Austin	#370	1979
Vincent James Russo	#371	1979

== FBI directors in the 1970s ==
- J. Edgar Hoover (1935–1972)
- Clyde Tolson (May 2–3, 1972)*
- L. Patrick Gray (1972–1973)*
- William D. Ruckelshaus (1973)*
- Clarence M. Kelley (1973–1978)
- James B. Adams (1978)*
- William H. Webster (1978–1987)

*Acting director
