= Partisan Defense Committee =

Coordinates: 40°43′18.3″N 74°00′34.1″W

- Website: http://www.partisandefense.org/

The Partisan Defense Committee describes itself as "a class-struggle, non-sectarian legal and social defense organization that champions cases and causes in the interests of the whole of the working people." The PDC works in accordance with the political orientation of the Spartacist League. The committee organizes demonstrations and performs legal work in defense of "class struggle" prisoners. Its longest standing campaign has been in defense of Mumia Abu-Jamal.

It has also organized counterdemonstrations in response to rallies planned by the Ku Klux Klan and white supremacists.

== Campaigns ==
The PDC describes the following 15 people as "class-war prisoners" and provides small stipends to them:

- Mumia Abu-Jamal
- Leonard Peltier, released in 2025.
- 7 members of MOVE
  - Chuck Africa
  - Michael Africa
  - Debbie Africa
  - Janet Africa
  - Janine Africa
  - Delbert Africa
  - Eddie Africa
- Albert Woodfox of the Angola Three
- The remaining 2 of the Ohio 7
  - Jaan Laaman
  - Tom Manning (prisoner)
- Rice–Poindexter case
  - Wopashitwe Mondo Eyen we Langa (f.k.a. David Rice)
  - Ed Poindexter
- Hugo Pinell of the San Quentin Six
- Alvaro Luna Hernandez
