= Pat Gros =

American political activist

Pat Gros (born Patricia Helen Rowbottom in 1948) is an American political activist who, with her romantic partner Raymond Luc Levasseur, went underground for a decade as part of the United Freedom Front (UFF). The group carried out bombings of political targets and robbed banks for funds. While living underground with rotating false identities and moving home frequently to avoid capture by a Joint Terrorism Task Force (JTTF), Gros had three daughters. Over the course of a decade, the UFF carried out around 19 bombings and stole at least $900,000 from banks, until in 1984, Gros was arrested with her family. At trial she was sentenced to five years in prison for harboring a fugitive, namely her partner. In 1989, the FBI brought further charges of racketeering and seditious conspiracy against Gros, Levasseur and another UFF member. All three were acquitted and Gros, who was already released on probation, faced no further charges.

== Early life ==
Patricia Helen Rowbottom was born December 11, 1948, in Redlands, California. She had five sisters and two brothers. She grew up in the US state of Maryland and went to a Catholic school. She was drawn to San Francisco by the Summer of Love in 1967, then moved to Portland, Maine. She entered a green card marriage with a German man, taking his surname, which was Gros. She was involved with the Statewide Correctional Alliance for Reform (SCAR), meeting radical activists such as Raymond Luc Levasseur, Tom Manning and Carol Manning. She and Levasseur became lovers, and they left SCAR in August 1974 to set up a radical bookshop. The couple were friends with the author Agnes Bushell, who later used their exploits as the inspiration for a book called Local Deities.

== Underground ==
Gros, Levasseur and the Mannings formed a revolutionary group called the "Sam Melville / Jonathan Jackson Unit", named after the militants Sam Melville and Jonathan P. Jackson; later, they renamed the group the United Freedom Front (UFF). They went underground, planning to rob banks to cover living expenses while bombing targets to protest against issues such as apartheid in South Africa and to support groups such as the Fuerzas Armadas de Liberación Nacional (FALN, Armed Forces of National Liberation), which promoted independence for Puerto Rico. In January 1976, Gros gave birth to the first of three daughters she would have with Levasseur during the time they lived underground. They frequently relocated to evade capture by the authorities, living in towns across the states of Connecticut, Maine, New Hampshire, New York and Vermont. In each new location, the gang took up a new false identity; Gros would look after her children and find work as a waitress or a temp and Levasseur scouted locations for robberies and bombings. According to Gros, both she and Carol Manning started to feel that raising children was more important than engaging in direct action.

On April 22, 1976, the UFF made their first bombing at the probation office at the Suffolk County Courthouse in Boston, Massachusetts. Gros made a telephone warning which was ignored, so she called a second time, but there were still people inside the building when the bomb went off, and 22 people were injured as a result. Gros was upset that members of the public had been hurt and discussed with Levasseur how to make sure the target buildings were empty in future. The UFF next bombed the courthouse in Lowell, Massachusetts on June 21 and the First National Bank of Boston in Revere, Massachusetts on July 4, 1976 (marking the United States Bicentennial).

After being arrested with Cameron Bishop (who was on the list of FBI Ten Most Wanted Fugitives) as they prepared to carry out a heist, Levasseur skipped bail and was himself added to the list in 1976. On March 2, 1978, he and Tom Manning robbed a bank in Waterbury, Connecticut, which they had been living near to. After the robbery, the group escaped to Derby to hide from police. A month later, Gros gave birth to her second daughter. The group returned to direct action in 1981, with a bank robbery in New Britain, Connecticut. Soon afterwards, Levasseur was nearly arrested when he tried to obtain the birth certificate of a dead baby in order to create fake identification. Gros had to borrow a vehicle from the neighbour to pick him up and the family quickly abandoned their house in Cambridge, New York, moving to a farmhouse in Germansville, Pennsylvania. In December 1981, there was an incident in which state trooper Philip Lamonaco was shot dead by either Tom Manning or the new UFF member Richard Williams. Levasseur had not been present but knew that whole group would come under extra scrutiny, so he ordered another move, this time to Yonkers, New York. After the FBI became aware that Gros and Levasseur had children, photographs of their three daughters were added to the wanted posters; this move was condemned by Psychology Today. In later testimony, Williams admitted that after Lamonaco's killing it had become harder to remain safely underground. Over the course of a decade, the UFF had carried out around 19 bombings and stolen at least $900,000 from banks.

== Arrest and trials ==
A Joint Terrorism Task Force (JTTF) was set up by the FBI alongside the New York State Police in 1982 to track the members of the UFF under the name BOSLUC (an acronym that took the first three letters of the city where the force was based, namely Boston, and added Levasseur's middle name, which was Luc). It eventually featured agents from the Bureau of Alcohol, Tobacco and Firearms (BATF) and police officers from the states of Maine, Massachusetts, Vermont, New Hampshire, New Jersey, Ohio and Pennsylvania. After being donated a mainframe computer by the Grumman Corporation, the JTTF used it to match a false identity presented by Gros when she was involved in a car crash several years earlier to a mailbox currently rented under that name in Columbus, Ohio. The taskforce put the mailbox under surveillance and when Gros checked her mail on November 3, 1984, she was followed to a home in Deerfield, Ohio. The FBI watched as she led them to the other fugitives. Gros, Levasseur and their three children were arrested on November 4. Curzi Laaman, Jan Laaman and Richard Williams were apprehended the same day in Cleveland. The Mannings fled from their house and stayed underground until the following year, when they were arrested after being traced from the serial numbers on a gun found in the Cleveland raid.

The three daughters of Gros and Levasseur were questioned for five hours by the FBI and New Jersey State Police. The eldest daughter said she was hungry and was offered $20 and a pizza to reveal where the Mannings were. The children were then passed to the welfare department despite family members offering to look after them. Gros was tried separately from the others after her attorney withdrew from the case for personal reasons. She was sentenced to five years in prison for harboring a fugitive, namely Levasseur.

In February 1989, the FBI brought further charges of racketeering and seditious conspiracy against Gros, Levasseur and Williams. Gros commented "Eight of us are charged with conspiracy to overthrow the US government by the use of force and we never had any Redeye missiles; we had no tanks; no helicopters; and no hundred million dollars." At trial, her lawyer claimed that Levasseur had decided to go underground and therefore left Gros with no choice except to follow him in order to keep her family together. By this point, Gros had already spent three and a half years in jail before being released on probation; she and the others were acquitted of the new charges.

== Later life ==
After her release from prison, Gros participated in the Lynne Stewart Legal Defense Committee, which supported Lynne Stewart. She also contributed five poems to a collection of writings by political prisoners edited by Levasseur and Tim Blunk.
