= Central Institute (disambiguation) =

Central Institute may refer to:

- Predecessor of Hendrix College
- Predecessor of Littleton Female College
