= David A. De Armond =

American lawyer and politician (1844–1909)

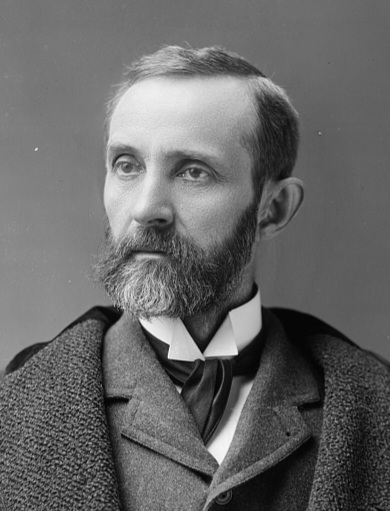

Member of the U.S. House of Representatives from Missouri
- In office March 4, 1891 – November 23, 1909
- Preceded by: William J. Stone
- Succeeded by: Clement C. Dickinson
- Constituency: 12th district (1891–1893); 6th district (1893–1909)

Member of the Missouri Senate from the 20th district
- In office 1879–1882

Personal details
- Born: David Albaugh De Armond; March 18, 1844 Altoona, Pennsylvania, US
- Died: November 23, 1909 (aged 65) Butler, Missouri, US
- Party: Democratic
- Relations: Harvey C. Clark (son-in-law)
- Children: 4, including Edward
- Education: Lycoming College
- Occupation: Lawyer, politician

David Albaugh De Armond (March 18, 1844 – November 23, 1909) was an American lawyer and politician. A Democrat, he was a member of the United States House of Representatives from Missouri. He was noted among the Democrats in Congress and was a favorite to become both Democratic Party Leader and Speaker of the House, though was elected to neither office.

== Early life and education ==
De Armond was born on March 18, 1844, in Altoona, Pennsylvania, the eldest of six children born to James De Armond and Catherine (née Albaugh) De Armond. He was or Irish and Dutch descent. Educated at public schools in Altoone. He graduated from Lycoming College in 1886, and subsidized his tuition by working as an educator. Also in 1866, he moved to Davenport, Iowa. There, he studied law, and in 1867, was admitted to the bar, after which he practiced in Davenport.

== Career ==
In 1869, De Armond moved to Greenfield, Missouri. A Democrat, he served in the Missouri Senate from 1879 to 1882, representing the 20th district. In 1883, he moved to Bates County, living between Rich Hill and Butler. In 1884, he was a Presidential Elector who voted for Grover Cleveland. In 1885, he was appointed a commissioner of the Supreme Court of Missouri. From 1886 to 1890, he served as Judge of the 22nd Judicial Court.

De Armond represented Missouri in the United States House of Representatives from March 4, 1891, to November 23, 1909. He represented the 12th district from 1891 to 1893, and the 6th district from 1893 to 1903. He was a member of the Committee on Rules, the Committee on the judiciary, and the Joint Committee on Printing. In spring 1908, he was removed from the Committee on Rules and replaced by John J. Fitzgerald, following the appointment of Speaker Joseph Gurney Cannon. In 1905, he was part committee which deliberated the impeachment of judge Charles Swayne.

De Armond was twice encouraged to run for governor of Missouri, declining both times. He also unsuccessfully ran for United States Senate in 1902, withdrawing his nomination.

Politically, De Armond was liberal, and specialized in labor law. He was uncompromising in his beliefs, at times vote in opposition to the Democratic Party to stand for himself. He was described as a Democratic leader during his tenure. He was a favorite to become Democratic Party Leader and Speaker of the House, though was elected to neither office. He was a strong public speaker, often employing humor and sarcasm in his speeches. His sarcasm caused a fight between him and John Sharp Williams in 1907, neither being badly injured as a result.

== Personal life and death ==
De Armond was married to Alice M. Long, with whom he had four children. As for his personality, he was described as reserved and cold.

De Armond died on November 23, 1909, aged 65, after his home in Butler caught fire. He and his grandson were killed in the fire, as they had been asleep on a balcony on the second story of the house and were trapped. The origin of the fire was unknown. Its damages were estimated at $20,000. He was buried on November 26, in Oak Hill Cemetery, in Butler. His son, David Jr., served as adjutant general of Missouri and Mayor of Butler. Another son was military officer Edward Harrison DeArmond. His daughter, Harriet, was the first wife of military officer Harvey C. Clark, who had studied law in De Armond's office.

== See also ==
- List of members of the United States Congress who died in office (1900–1949)

U.S. House of Representatives
Preceded by William Joel Stone	Member of the U.S. House of Representatives from Missouri's 12th congressional district 1891–1893	Succeeded by Seth Wallace Cobb
Preceded by John T. Heard	Member of the U.S. House of Representatives from Missouri's 6th congressional district 1893–1909	Succeeded by Clement C. Dickinson
