= SSOC =

SSOC may stand for:

- Southern Student Organizing Committee, an American student activist group
- S.T.A.L.K.E.R.: Shadow of Chernobyl, a computer game
- Short Sleeve Open Collar, used frequently in the United States Armed Forces
