= Littleton Female College =

Former Methodist-affiliated college in North Carolina

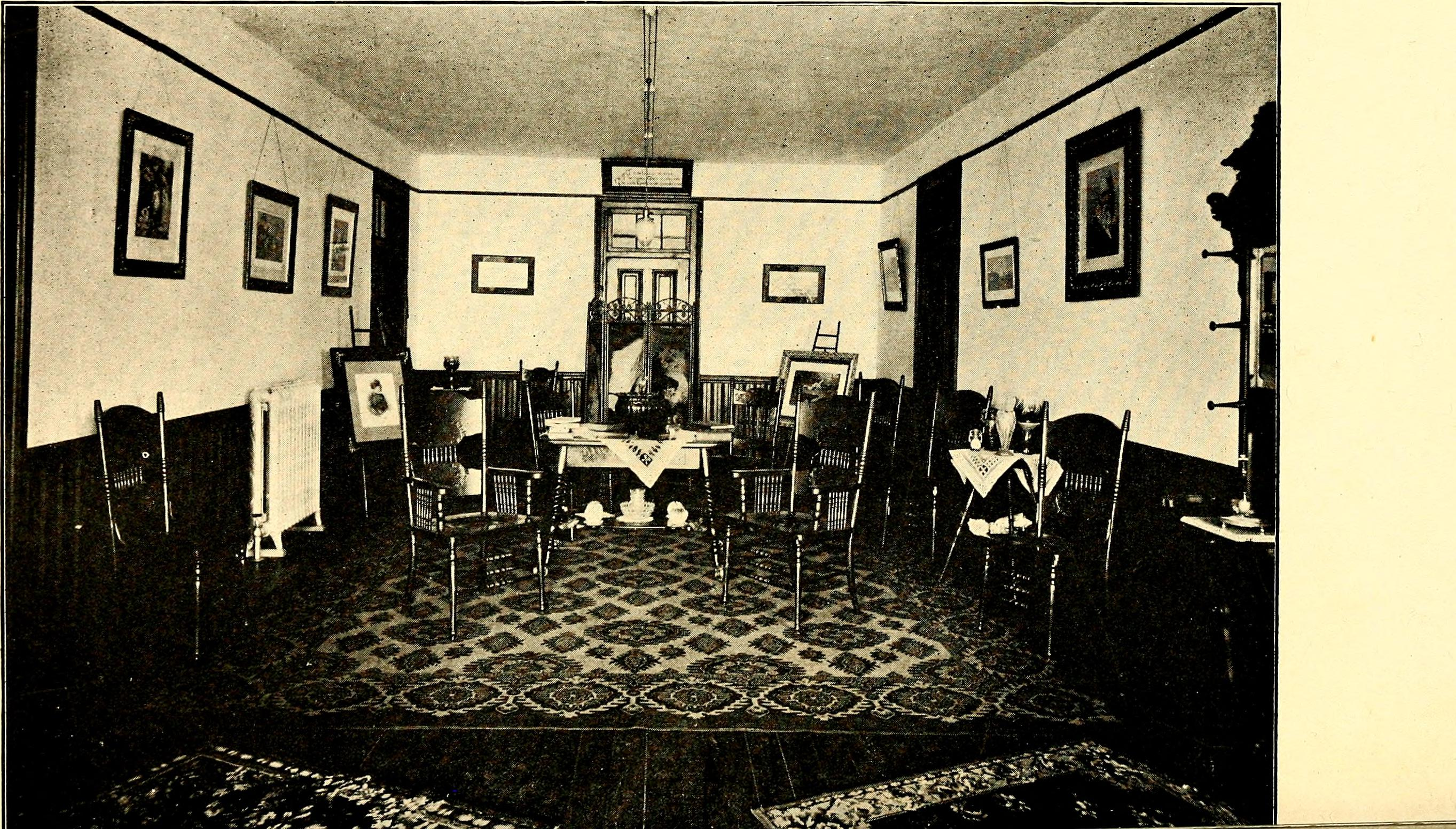

1889-1890 course catalog (readable pdf)

Littleton Female College, established as Central Institute and also known as Littleton College, was a Methodist-affiliated women's college Littleton, North Carolina from 1882–1919. James Manly Rhodes (1850–1941) served as its president except for during a two-year period. It was destroyed by a fire in 1919.

1906-1907 course catalog (readable)

Courses included chemistry, physics, stenography, languages, and history. "Female" was dropped from the name in 1912. A historical marker commemorates its history.

== See also ==
- Women's colleges in the United States
- List of women's universities and colleges in the United States
- Scarritt College
