= Southern Student Organizing Committee =

American student activist group

- Abbreviation: SSOC
- Founded: 1964; 62 years ago
- Dissolved: 1969; 57 years ago
- Newspaper: The New Rebel; New South Student
- Ideology: Pacifism; Anti-racism; Feminism
- Political position: Left-wing

The Southern Student Organizing Committee (SSOC) was a New Left student activist group in the southern United States during the 1960s, which focused on many political and social issues including: African-American civil rights, opposition to the Vietnam War, workers' rights, and feminism. It was intended, in part, to be Students for a Democratic Society (SDS) for Southerners and Student Nonviolent Coordinating Committee (SNCC) for white students – at a time when it was dangerous for SDS to attempt to organize in the Deep South and when SNCC was starting to discuss expelling white volunteers. It was felt that students at the traditionally white and black colleges in the South could be more effectively organized separately than in an integrated student civil rights organization; however, this was controversial and initially opposed by advisors like Anne Braden.

Sue Thrasher and Archie Allen of the Christian Action Fellowship were among the founders of the group, with the support of Bob Moses and others. At its inception, the group had close ties to controversial Louisville, Kentucky radicals Carl and Anne Braden and their organization, the Southern Conference Education Fund, but a deliberate effort was later made to put some distance between the SSOC and the Bradens to avoid the appearance that the SSOC was a Communist front.

== Founding and history ==
The SSOC was founded in April 1964, during a meeting of forty-five delegates from approximately 15 campuses.

After its founding, SSOC came to be formally tied to the SDS as a fraternal organization with a regional mandate in the South, and joint SDS-SSOC chapters existed at some schools like the University of North Carolina. A monthly organ, The New South Student, was published on a regular basis. In 1967, SSOC organizers led by Gene Guerrero and Lynn Wells, worked with TWUA on a unionization drive in North Carolina textile mills, involving more than 300 students in the campaign. In 1968, Gene Guerrero and Howard Romaine were among the SSOC activists involved in founding Atlanta's widely circulated underground newspaper, The Great Speckled Bird.

SSOC considered itself a distinctly Southern organization and sometimes embraced traditional Confederate symbols and language. In 1968, SSOC staged a series of antiwar protests called "Southern Days of Secession," in which they urged Southerners to "secede" from the Vietnam War. The SSOC button was a Confederate flag with black and white hands shaking in front of it. The hands were modeled on a handshake between SSOC organizer Archie Allen and SNCC chairman John Lewis. It was designed by an artist on the SNCC staff, Claude Weaver.

=== Activity ===
SSOC had an extensive literature program, printing thousands of copies of pamphlets on civil rights, the Vietnam war, poverty and campus reform that were sold on campus literature tables across the south. The bestseller was entitled "Vietnam: The Myth and Reality of American Policy." During the school year, it published a monthly magazine called The New Rebel, later renamed to The New South Student. One of the magazine's features was a series called "The Roots of Southern Radicalism", which featured stories on historic predecessors of SSOC back to slave revolts, the American revolution, the abolition movement, the Populists, the union organizing drives of the 1930s, and institutions and organizations like Highlander Center, Koinonia Farms, and the Southern Conference for Human Welfare. SSOC also organized a conference in Atlanta on Radical Southern History.

SSOC had four chairmen during its five-year history: Gene Guerrero, Howard Romaine, Steve Wise, and Tom Gardner. During its last year, it changed the post to two secretaries, Mike Welch and Lyn Wells, and added a newspaper called The Phoenix, to SSOC's list of publications.

SSOC leased the historic camp at Buckeye Cove in Swannanoa, North Carolina from the Fellowship of Southern Churchmen and held many conferences there. SSOC conferences had a variety of topics but were a way for southern activists, who often felt isolated on the conservative and largely segregated campuses of the time to meet like-minded students from other places and draw strength and inspiration from their activities.

Through a traveling teach-in on Vietnam and American foreign policy that toured southern states between 1967 and 1969, SSOC helped to organize the antiwar movement in the south. The appearance of SSOC delegations at national antiwar marches always resulted in enthusiastic applause.

For some Southern schools, even though SSOC had a presence, the numbers were so small in comparison to the size of the student bodies that it could not gain traction as anything but protest theatre. For example, SSOC organizers came to the University of Tennessee in Knoxville, connected with a few individuals and left buttons and flyers with them and then departed. Of the 26,000 students on campus, only about ten were recruited.

Early in 1969, these individuals gathered in a highly resonant hallway and staged an "organizational meeting". On audiotape it sounded like hundreds were attending and a motion was made to follow SDS's example at Columbia University and take over the campus Administration building the next day.

The tape was "leaked" to the Administration of U.T. and, to the surprise of the participants, the next morning the campus was flooded with police, the windows of the Administration building were shuttered with wooden boards, and a truck was backed up to the doorway blocking entry while keeping the Administration locked inside. One of the members volunteered to brandish a toy water-pistol machine gun and parade back and forth in front of the building. Everyone else stayed out of sight. The individual was arrested and subsequently released. Nothing more happened.

== Decline ==
Over time, radicals in SDS increasingly saw SSOC as too liberal and too timid. SSOC finally dissolved itself in 1969 as the result of an internal struggle with members of Progressive Labor, a Maoist sect, after members of PL had successfully passed a resolution at an SDS convention condemning SSOC's "anachronistic" regionalism and breaking the ties between the organizations.

The breakup of SSOC came in 1969, the same year that its counterpart New Left Organizations, SNCC and SDS, collapsed—in part because of the COINTELPRO efforts, but in larger part because the movement had grown so widespread that the organizational forms of the early 1960s were no longer able to handle it. What SSOC organizer Ed Hamlett called "the radical beer-drinking five" on southern campuses became the long-haired pot-smoking hundreds (or thousands), and instead of getting ideas from mimeographed pamphlets, they could turn on the nightly news and see massive demonstrations and dramatic trials like those of the Chicago 7.

In the bitterness following the breakup of SSOC, the organization's papers were taken and burned, lest they fall into the hands of the FBI. This also threatened the memory of the organization and its efforts with becoming historically extinct. However, in the 1990s, a graduate student at the University of Virginia, Gregg Michel, decided to write his dissertation on SSOC and began contacting and interviewing old activists, and organized a reunion of them in Charlottesville, VA in 1994. It turned out that many people had saved SSOC material, and were willing to donate them to an archive that was established at the University of Virginia Library. Michel's dissertation was published as Struggle for a Better South in 2004 and the memory of the organization was brought back from the brink of historic oblivion. The book was launched with a panel at the American Studies Association convention in Atlanta in 2004 that brought together many SSOC and SNCC activists (including all four SSOC chairmen).

After the breakup of SSOC, two former members, Howard Romaine and Sue Thrasher, were instrumental in forming the Institute for Southern Studies with Julian Bond.

Raymond Luc Levasseur, later the leader of the United Freedom Front, worked with the SSOC.

== See also ==
- New Left
- Young Patriots Organization
- The New York Foundation
