= Harvey C. Clark =

U.S. Army brigadier general

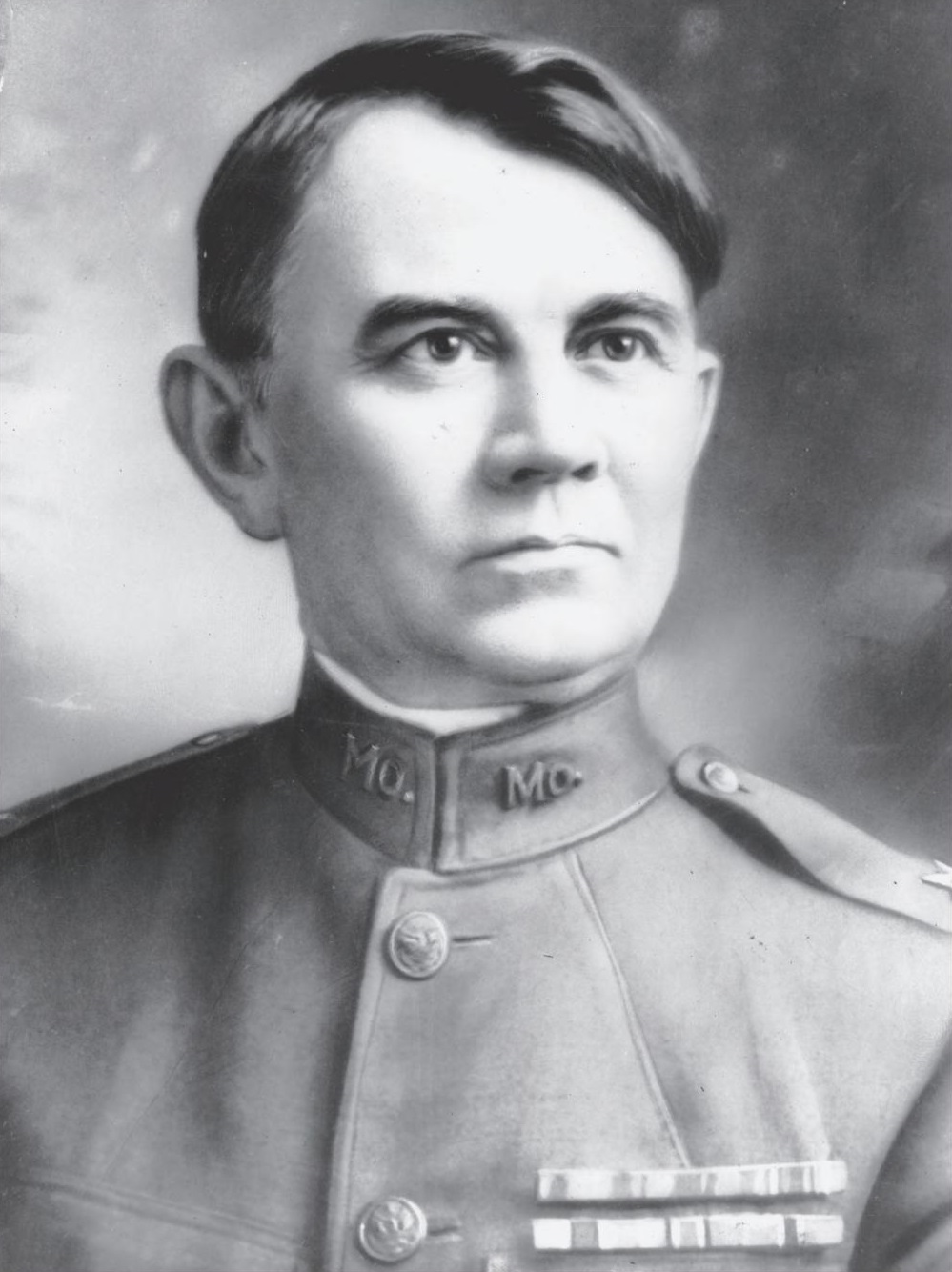
- Museum of Missouri Military History portrait, c. 1910
- Born: September 7, 1869; Lebanon Township, Cooper County, Missouri, U.S.
- Died: April 11, 1921 (aged 51); St. Louis, Missouri, U.S.
- Burial place: Oak Hill Cemetery, Butler, Missouri, U.S.
- Education: Wentworth Military Academy; Scarritt College (A.B., 1891)
- Spouse(s): Harriet "Hattie" De Armond (m. 1897–1909) Sudye "Sue" C. Berry (m. 1909–1921)
- Relatives: David A. De Armond (father-in-law)
- Military career
- Allegiance: United States; Missouri
- Service: United States Army; Missouri National Guard
- Service years: 1888–1921
- Rank: Major General
- Unit: Missouri National Guard
- Commands: Company B, 2nd Missouri Infantry Regiment; 1st Brigade, Missouri National Guard; Missouri National Guard Division; 3rd Separate Brigade; 68th Infantry Brigade; 60th Depot Brigade; Adjutant General of Missouri
- Wars: Spanish–American War; Pancho Villa Expedition; World War I
- Memorials: Camp Clark, Nevada, Missouri, U.S.
- Other work: Attorney; Prosecuting Attorney, Bates County, Missouri

Harvey C. Clark (September 7, 1869 – April 11, 1921) was an American attorney and military officer from Missouri. A Democrat in politics, he served as prosecuting attorney of Bates County, Missouri, for two terms beginning in 1896. A longtime member of the Missouri National Guard, he attained the rank of major general as commander of Missouri's division, and served as adjutant general of Missouri from 1918 to 1921.

A native of Lebanon Township, Cooper County, Missouri, Clark was raised in Butler, Missouri and graduated from Butler Academy, Wentworth Military Academy, and Scarritt College. He studied law with a Butler attorney from 1891 to 1893, attained admission to the bar, and practiced in Butler before moving to Nevada, Missouri. A Democrat, he served as prosecuting attorney of Bates County from 1897 to 1901.

Clark joined the Missouri National Guard as a captain in 1888. He served in the Spanish–American War and rose through the ranks in command positions during the post-war period to attain the rank of major general. He accepted a reduction in rank to brigadier general so he could lead Missouri troops on the U.S.–Mexico border in Texas during the 1916 Pancho Villa Expedition. During the early days of World War I, he commanded the 60th Depot Brigade at Camp Doniphan, Oklahoma. After failing his physical because of high blood pressure, in early 1918, he returned to Missouri, where he was appointed adjutant general of the Missouri National Guard. Clark served in this post until January 1921, when he retired from the military.

Clark became ill in early April 1921 and was admitted to a hospital in St. Louis. He did not recover and died in St. Louis on April 11, 1921. He was buried at Oak Hill Cemetery in Butler.

== Early life ==
Harvey Cyrus Clark was born on a farm in Lebanon Township, Cooper County, Missouri, on September 7, 1869, a son of James Cyrus Clark and Melissa M. (née Myers) Clark. The Clark family soon moved to Butler, Missouri, where James Clark was active in politics as a Democrat and served two terms as sheriff of Bates County, followed by two terms as county tax collector before becoming cashier of the Bates County Bank.

Harvey Clark grew up in Butler and attended local public schools, including Butler Academy, from which he graduated in 1887. He then went on to attend Wentworth Military Academy, graduating in 1889. He was then a student at Scarritt College, where he received a Bachelor of Arts degree in 1891. After college, Clark studied law with David A. De Armond, and he attained admission to the bar in 1893.

== Civilian career ==
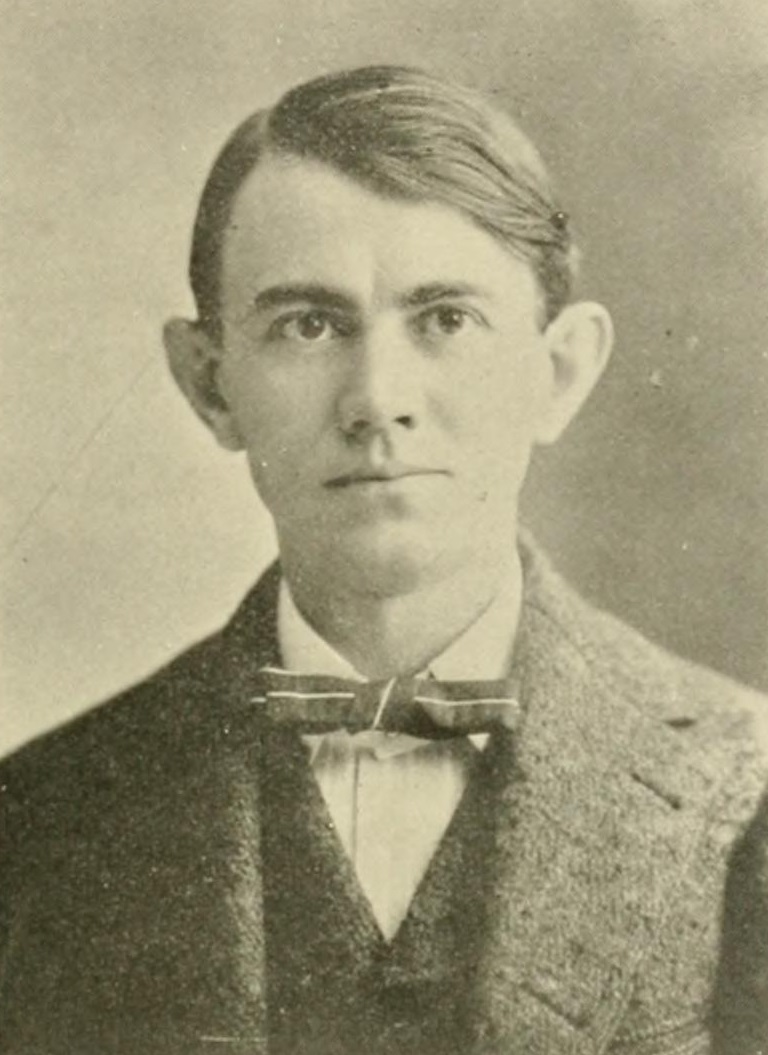
Clark, c. 1897

After attaining admission to the bar, Clark practiced in Butler as the partner of Waller Washington Graves, an association that continued until 1906, when Graves was appointed to the Supreme Court of Missouri. He then practiced in Nevada as the partner of John S. Francisco. Clark was an active Democrat in politics, and he was elected prosecuting attorney of Bates County in 1896. He was reelected in 1898 and served from 1897 to 1901. Clark earned a reputation as a skilled civil and criminal lawyer, and his corporate clients included the Kansas City Southern Railway, the Missouri Pacific Railroad, and the Missouri Pacific Coal Company.

Clark was a supporter of William Jennings Bryan for president in 1896 and made campaign speeches on behalf of the Bryan Free Silver Club. He supported Bryan again in 1900and made speeches at Democratic rallies throughout western Missouri. Clark also made speeches on behalf of Democratic candidates in several Missouri towns during the 1904 elections. Clark continued to support the Democratic Party as he reached middle age and made speeches in Bates County on behalf of the party's candidates in 1908. In October 1912, Clark gave the speech introducing U.S. Senator James A. Reed at a Nevada rally that featured Reed and U.S. Representative Perl D. Decker.

In addition to his legal career, Clark was a civic activist and was also active in veterans' organizations. He was a member of the Royal Arch Masons, Independent Order of Odd Fellows, Knights of Pythias, Elks, and Modern Woodmen of America. In addition, he was active in the United Spanish War Veterans and was a founder of the American Legion.

== Military career ==
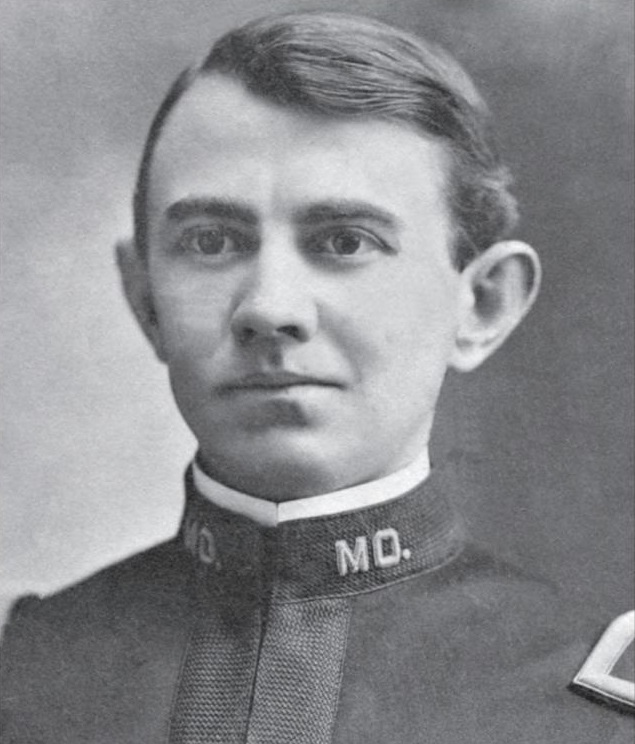
Clark, c. 1900

In 1888, Clark helped organize a unit of the Missouri National Guard, which was designated Company B, 2nd Infantry Regiment. He was elected to command the company with the rank of captain, and he remained in this position until June 1897. While in command of Company B, Clark was twice elected lieutenant colonel and second-in-command of the regiment, but he declined each time because he preferred to lead his company. In June 1897, Clark was promoted to major as quartermaster officer of the Missouri National Guard's 1st Brigade.

At the start of the Spanish–American War in April 1898, Clark accepted a request from Missouri's governor to organize a unit of United States Volunteers. He was promoted to lieutenant colonel of the regiment, which was accepted for federal service as the 6th Missouri Infantry. The 6th Missouri was assigned to the Seventh Army Corps, which was commanded by Fitzhugh Lee. Lee's corps performed occupation duty in Cuba during late 1898 and early 1899. In February 1899, Clark's wartime service was recognized with promotion to brigadier general and assignment as commander of the 1st Brigade.

Clark continued in command of the 1st Brigade until September 1912, when the Missouri National Guard was organized into a division, which Clark was assigned to command with the rank of major general. Clark commanded the division until June 1916, when he accepted a reduction to brigadier general to take command of four regiments of the Missouri National Guard accepted for federal service during the Pancho Villa Expedition as the 3rd Separate Brigade. Clark's brigade performed border security near Laredo, Texas, until mustering out of federal service in January 1917.

With the army expanding for U.S. entry into World War I, during early 1917, Clark was responsible for recruiting and organizing Missouri National Guard units so they could be called to federal service. In August 1917, Clark was called to federal active duty as a brigadier general and appointed to command first the 68th Infantry Brigade, a unit of the 34th Division, then the 60th Depot Brigade at Camp Doniphan, Oklahoma. In December 1917, Clark failed his physical examination because he was diagnosed with high blood pressure, and he returned to Missouri. In January 1918, he was appointed adjutant general of the Missouri National Guard with the rank of brigadier general. He led the organization during the rest of the war and oversaw its demobilization following the Armistice of November 11, 1918. Clark also led the Missouri National Guard during its post-war reorganization and served as adjutant general until retiring in January 1921.

== Personal life and death ==
In June 1897, Clark married Harriet "Hattie" De Armond, the daughter of politician David A. De Armond. They divorced in October 1909, and in December, Clark married Sudye "Sue" C. Berry, who had divorced her husband, Robert Kennon, in November. Clark had no children, but was the stepfather of his second wife's son Edward.

Clark became ill in early April and was admitted to a hospital in St. Louis. He died in St. Louis on April 11, 1921. Clark was buried at Oak Hill Cemetery, in Butler.

Camp Clark, a Missouri National Guard training facility established in Nevada, Missouri, in 1908, was named for Clark.
