= Institute for Southern Studies =

- Formation: 1970
- Type: Non-profit research, education and media center
- Headquarters: Durham, North Carolina, US
- Official language: English
- Executive Director: Chris Kromm
- Key people: Eric Bates, Julian Bond, Michael De Los Santos, Ajamu Dillahunt, Bob Hall, Fiona Morgan, on Nixon, Howard Romaine, Pam Spaulding, Sue Sturgis, Kerry Taylor, Sue Thrasher, Timothy Tyson
- Website: http://www.southernstudies.org

The Institute for Southern Studies is a non-profit media and research center based in Durham, North Carolina, advocating for progressive political and social causes in the Southern United States.

== History and background ==
The institute was founded in 1970 by veterans of the Civil Rights Movement, including Julian Bond, leader in the Student Nonviolent Coordinating Committee, and Howard Romaine and Sue Thrasher, veterans of the Southern Student Organizing Committee and aimed to continue the momentum of 1960s movements for equality and justice, expanding to labor rights, environmental protection and democratic reform.

== Research and education programs ==
Focusing on a broad range of issues: economic justice, civil rights, environmental protection and democratic reform. Including:

- Gulf Coast Reconstruction Watch, a project tracking the aftermath of Hurricane Katrina;
- the Peace and Security Program, which has examined the South's disproportionate ties to the military and the Iraq War; and,
- the Environment and Energy Reporting Project, launched in 2008, which examines the political and economic influence of the energy industry in the South.

Between 2000 and 2011, The Institute's Voting Rights Watch project has publicized such issues as the cost of voter ID laws, barriers to student voting and voter registration "purges" that have prevented citizens from voting.

Current programs include: Census and Redistricting Project, the Energy and Environment Reporting Project, and the Freedom Journalism School.

== Southern Exposure ==
In 1973, the Institute began publishing Southern Exposure, a journal covering a broad range of political and cultural issues, with a special emphasis on investigative journalism and oral history.

Southern Exposure has been recognized with numerous major journalism awards, including two George Polk Awards (Magazine Reporting and Regional Reporting), a National Magazine Award (Public Interest Reporting), the John Hancock Award for Excellence in Business and Financial Journalism, and awards from Investigative Reporters and Editors, the National Press Club, the Society of Professional Journalists, and the White House Correspondents' Association.

Notable authors who have contributed to Southern Exposure include Julian Bond, Anne Braden, Denise Giardina, Jim Hightower, Bernice Johnson Reagon, Stetson Kennedy, Mab Segrest, Lee Smith, Studs Terkel and Alice Walker. Southern Exposure published quarterly from 1973–2000 and 2002–2005.

In 2003/2004, Southern Exposure published "Banking on Misery," an award-winning investigative series that was one of the first in-depth reports on the growing predatory lending crisis, especially the leading role of Citigroup in predatory banking practices. The Columbia Journalism Review later credited Southern Exposure with breaking the story about Citigroup's dependence on subprime lending (three out of four loans originating from Citigroup in 2000 were from its subprime unit, Southern Exposure reported) and foreshadowing the 2007/2008 home credit crisis.

After a two-year hiatus, Southern Exposure resumed publication in 2011 with an issue about the health crisis facing Gulf Coast communities in the wake of the Deepwater Horizon oil spill. The most recent issue was published in 2012.

== Facing South online magazine and newsletter ==
Since 2000, the Institute has published a regular email newsletter, Facing South, named after a syndicated newspaper column, published by the Institute during the Southern Exposure years. In 2005, the Institute began a daily blog, also called Facing South, which covers a wide range of political and social issues. Facing South is now an online magazine with weekly content that includes political analysis, and investigative journalism. Regular contributors include Chris Kromm, executive director of the Institute, Sue Sturgis, Facing South's editorial director and a former reporter for The News & Observer (Raleigh) and The Independent Weekly, Benjamin Barber, Rebekah Barber, Olivia Paschal, Billy Corriher, and Elisha Brown.

In April/May 2008, Facing South drew widespread attention for breaking the story about illegal and allegedly deceptive election practices by Women's Voices Women Vote, a non-profit group in Washington, D.C., with close ties to Bill Clinton and Hillary Clinton. Media coverage resulting from Facing South's investigative report appeared on ABC News, The Charlotte Observer, CNN, The Economist, Harper's Magazine, Politico, Salon, TPM Muckraker, The Washington Post, Wired, and dozens of other major outlets. Women's Voices Women Vote settled with the state of North Carolina in October 2008 and agreed to pay a $100,000 fine for not complying with state law. Facing South has also published investigations into conservative megadonor Art Pope, the BP Oil Spill, and poultry industry workers during the COVID-19 pandemic.

Facing South now averages a readership of over 40,000 visitors a month.
