= Sue Thrasher =

Civil rights activist

- Born: Martha Sue Thrasher

Academic background
- Education: University of Massachusetts at Amherst
- Thesis: International women as popular educators : an inquiry into the nature and implications of everyday experience (1994)

Martha Sue Thrasher is an activist, writer and educator known for her work on civil rights and gathering white students into the civil rights movement in the 1960s.

== Early life and education ==
Thrasher is originally from rural West Tennessee, where she grew as one of four children in a Methodist family. She started college at Lambuth College, then, after working with black students from Lane College during a mock United Nations event she transferred to Scarritt College because it was an integrated school. Later, Thrasher received an M.Ed. (1994) and an Ed.D. (1996) from the Center for International Education at the University of Massachusetts Amherst.

== Activism ==
Thrasher first became involved in the activist community while a student at Scarritt College where she joined the Student Nonviolent Coordinating Committee shortly after arriving on campus and learned the basics about grassroots organization and planning. In 1963 Thrasher led a group in Nashville, Tennessee to protest against the policies of a local restaurant, with early actions centered on an Easter weekend meeting in Nashville in 1964. These actions led to the founding of the Southern Students Organizing Committee, and Thrasher served as its first executive secretary. As the executive director of the Southern Students Organizing Committee, Thrasher would consistently host gatherings at her home with other local activist to plan, collaborate and work together; she was the only woman who served as an officer in the organization. During her tenure, she organized and led the “white folks project” during the Mississippi summer where Thrasher aimed to include more white people in the civil rights movement by actively recruiting white Americans. In 1970, Thrasher went on to found (with some of her SSOC counterparts), the Institute for Southern Studies, a research center that advocates for progressive political and social causes that affect that Southern United States.

Thrasher's work in the civils rights movement is also covered in J. Anthony Lukas's book, Don't shoot we are your children, which was reviewed by Kurt Vonnegut in Life magazine.

== Later life ==
In 1978 Thrasher transitioned to a job at the Highlander Center where she worked to organize their archives and conducting oral histories and sharing the stories with the public. Thrasher retired from the University of Massachusetts Amherst in 2013.
