= The Block (Richmond, Virginia) =

Area in Richmond, Virginia, U.S. that hosted an underground gay community

The Block is an area in Richmond, Virginia, United States that from the 1940s to the late 1970s hosted an underground gay culture and community, with several bars and venues. It was the focus of ongoing harassment from the ABC Department because homosexual activity, including serving alcohol to gay people, was illegal and would result in arrest.

== Introduction ==
From the 1940s until the late 1970s, Richmond had an underground culture that thrived beneath vigilant eyes. The gay community had to build its own society in order to catch up on news, socialize, and hook up. The Block was known as a particular area in downtown Richmond where the gay community thrived at night. The establishments in this area had to deal with constant harassment from the ABC Department because serving and participating in any sort of gay activity would result in arrest.

== Geography ==
In the 1940s the Block started off being bounded by First, Franklin, Main, and Foushee streets. As the community grew, the Block expanded to Grace Street. The community had to move frequently to avoid pressure from local authorities. This area was also known for its hustlers and prostitution, but the police were more concerned with finding people participating in homosexual acts.

== Alcohol and beverage control issues ==
In the late 1960s a couple of well-known bars, Renee's and Rathskeller, were shut down by the ABC department for serving any homosexuals. The regulations used to persecute the gays are as follows:

- Section 4-37 states in part "… a bar's license may be suspended or revoked if the bar has become a meeting place and rendezvous for users of narcotics, drunks, homosexuals, prostitutes, pimps, panderers, gamblers or habitual law violators…" - Section 4 – 98 "…forbids a licensee from employing any person who has the general reputation as a prostitute, homosexual, panderer, gambler, habitual law violator, person of ill repute, user of or peddler of narcotics, or person who drinks to excess or a "B-girl."

When ABC closed down Renee's, the ABC board heard a testimony from one of their agents that they witnessed "men wearing makeup, embracing and kissing in the café." Such a statement resulted in the bar having their beer and wine license revoked on March 13, 1969. These regulations were maintained until 1993 when the anti-gay provisions were removed when the Virginia General Assembly revised the state ABC code.

== Cruising around the Block ==
Broad Street Station and the USO were one of the first and biggest settings for gay cruising in the 1940s and 1950s. Broad Street Station was located on West Broad and the USO on the northeast corner of Eighth and East Broad Street. Both of these locations were teeming with service men on leave or heading to another assignment. Bob Swisher, a notable gay writer in Richmond, wrote an article for Our Community Press talking to a serviceman under a pseudonym. His article explains the type of things that went on at these stations from a first-hand experience: "Mark Kerkorian (a pseudonym) recalled the military personnel were "ready for anything" if they hadn't picked up a girl by 11 or 12 at night and that there were lots of places to take them like the basement of the hotel across Broad Street from the USO, or the men's room in the hotel or an alley behind the Colonial Theater."

The activity at these establishments laid the foundation for what was later known as the "Block."

== Bars on the Block ==
=== Marroni's ===
Marroni's Restaurant was opened in 1947 by E. Louis Marroni in the Capitol Hotel, located at 206 North Eighth Street. Marroni's was one of the most popular gay bars in the city until it had to close in 1962.

=== Eton's ===
Eton's was located at 938 West Grace Street. William A. Rotella opened Eton's in 1962 following Marroni's closing. It was one block away from Richmond Professional Institute, which became VCU in 1968. Eton's became the new hot spot for the underground gay society after Marroni's. VCU had actually banned its students from attending and held a strong stance against homosexuality. The school officials alerted the ABC board about a gay bar being so close to campus. After investigation the board charged Rotella with eight different charges. The charges varied from serving beer to gays and minors to being a meeting place for homosexuals. On March 31, 1967, the ABC board revoked Eton's liquor license and it closed. Until 2016, the VCU police department was housed where Eton's used to be.

=== Renee's ===
Renee's was another popular gay bar that took the place of Marroni's in the Capitol Hotel. Robert Gene Baldwin opened his restaurant in 1963. Like all the gay bars in the area, the ABC was constantly trying to shut it down. After ABC agents reported seeing "men wearing makeup, embracing and kissing in the café" Baldwin had his liquor license taken away and was forced to close for serving gays in March 1969.

=== Rathskeller's ===
Rathskeller's was one of the gay bars situated outside the usual Block. Robert Gene Baldwin also owned this establishment, which was located at 3526 West Cary Street, and it faced a similar demise at the hands of the ABC board. Following Renee's shutdown, Rathskeller's was also closed the same month for serving gays. The shutdown of both bars resulted in the first open protest against anti-gay action in Richmond.

== Leo Joseph Koury ==
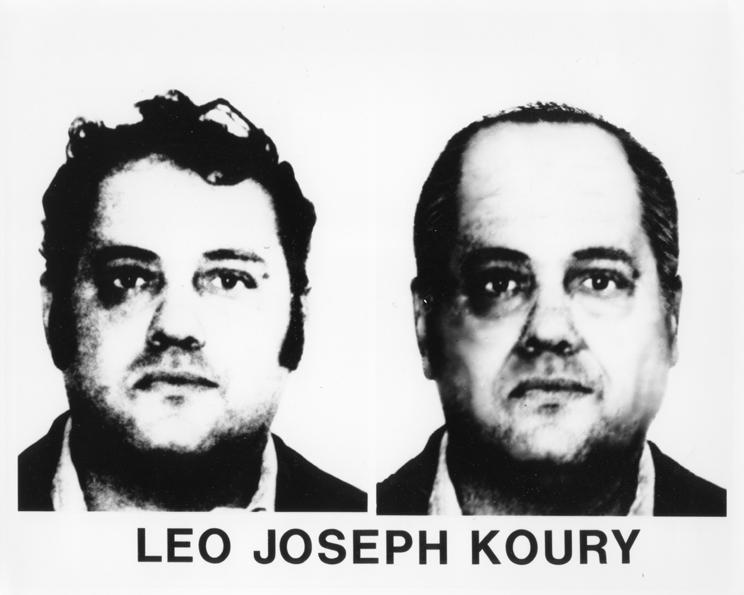
FBI Most Wanted Poster in 1979

Leo Joseph Koury (July 14, 1934 – June 17, 1991) was a notorious figure in the Block community due to his monopoly on exploiting the gay community. He realized that he could drastically overcharge the gay patrons to be in a place they could socialize comfortably, considering that in a straight bar they could legally be denied service because of their sexuality, or presumed sexuality. However, Koury's monopoly ended in October 1978 when a grand jury charged him with murder, racketeering, and other offenses that occurred at several gay bars. Before he was properly arrested Koury left Richmond to go on the run from the police. In 1979 the FBI added him to their Ten Most Wanted List and he was profiled again in 1991 by America's Most Wanted. He was also profiled on Unsolved Mysteries. Koury was never properly arrested because he died of a cerebral hemorrhage June 17, 1991 while a fugitive in California. For at least five years he lived under the name William Franklin Biddle, working at a local convenience store and lived a low profile life, keeping mostly to himself.

=== The Dialtone ===
Koury opened a new gay bar in the same location called the Dialtone in 1975. Dialtone was unique for a gay bar at the time because each table had phones for patrons to introduce themselves to each other from different tables. Koury sold the bar in 1976 to James Locklan Hilliard Jr, who renamed the restaurant J. Danhill Restaurant in September of that year.

=== Smitty's ===
Smitty's was another fan bar that extended the Block. From 1954 until 1959 Smitty's was located on 310 South Sheppard Street and was the primary hangout for women's softball teams. Koury added Smitty's to the list of gay bars he ran in the early 1960s. He referred to himself as the "godfather of the gay community." He changed the name to Leo's and continued to welcome to crowd regulars from Smitty's. By the 1970s his bar had turned into more of a gay men's bar and eatery. In 1976, Koury had relinquished the bar into the hands of a relative who renamed it the Male Box.

=== The Male Box ===
The Male Box made headlines when in 1977 a co-conspirator of Koury fired a shotgun into a crowd killing Albert Thomas and injuring two others. The shooting was seen as a way to regain control of his business. The incident sparked fear into the gay community because many assumed it was a violent homophobic hate crime.

== Present day ==
Life in Richmond, Virginia is substantially different from how it was before the 1980s. As more activism and support grew for the gay community, more establishments to serve them popped up. The gay community is no longer suppressed and limited to a one-block radius. Any adult of any orientation can go to a bar and order a beverage without being exploited, turned away, or arrested. Beth Marschak, Guy Kinman, and Bob Jones, who are major LGBT activists in Richmond, were interviewed by a local gay news source to talk about how much things have changed. Marschak and Jones commented on how there are only four outright gay bars currently, but that this was progress because strictly gay-only bars are not necessary for the community to socialize anymore. Jones was quoted by saying, "all these young people, lots of single women. I didn't notice any gay people. But now you just wouldn't know."
