= Fred Hampton Unit of the People's Forces =

American violent group

Fred Hampton Unit of the People's Force
- Purpose: Prison reform
- Headquarters: United States
- Origins: Splintered off from SCAR (Statewide Corrections Alliance for Reform)
- Leader: Richard Joseph Picariello

The Fred Hampton Unit of the Peoples Forces was a group led by Richard Joseph Picariello, that set off a series of bombs in Massachusetts and one in Seabrook, New Hampshire, targeting government infrastructure just before the United States Bicentennial. No fatalities or injuries were reported as a result of these bombings. They named themselves after Black Panther leader, Fred Hampton.

== Bombings ==
The first bombing took place on August 7, 1976 around 12:45a.m. at the Dorchester Armory for the National Guard. They placed the bomb on top of the gas tank of a truck while one of the men, Everett Carlson, poured gasoline under the trucks parked next to it. Another member, Edward Patrick Gullion, poured gas under the vehicles parked on the other side. The blast went off in the armory parking lot, severely damaging two, two‐and‐a‐half‐ton military trucks slightly damaging two others. Seven minutes prior, police had received a phone call who named the group and made threats towards a fleet of square-rigger ships that were coming in the following weekend for the bicentennial visit from Queen Elizabeth of Britain.

Nearly an hour later at 1:40p.m., a female employee at the Eastern Air Lines terminal at Logan International, received a call from a man that stated “You better get clear of the terminal. A plane will be blown up,”. Soon thereafter, an explosion destroyed an Eastern Airlines Electra turboprop liner on the tarmac along with a secondary explosion in the fuel tank. Afterward, police received a call from the man who said “This is the Fred Hampton Peoples Force, and we are responsible for the bombing, you’ll receive further communiques and demands from us.”

Almost an hour later at 2:45p.m., a third explosion went off at the Essex County Courthouse in Newburyport in the probation office on the second floor. The police described it as “a real strong explosion” caused by perhaps more than dozen sticks of dynamite.

At 11p.m. the same day, a post office in Seabrook, New Hampshire was destroyed by an explosion that sent an air condition unit 40-feet form the building.

The group was also connected to the bombing of Central Main Power Company in Maine and 11 other bombings of infrastructure and corporations.

== Aftermath ==
The group consisted of Joseph Aceto, Everett Carlson, Richard J. Picariello, and Edward P. Gullion. Picariello, Aceto, and Carlson were in prison together at Thomaston State Prison in Maine, becoming associated with and eventually moving away from the Statewide Corrections Alliance for Reform a.k.a. SCAR.

Aceto was arrested on July 4 near Boston after high speed chase with police that resulted in him crashing into a tree. The police found two dynamite bombs and three guns in the car along with a purse filled with 22 sticks of dynamite. He later become a witness for the prosecution and testified against the others for a reduced sentence. Due to the blown sting operation, The others went on the run landing Picariello and Gullion on the FBI Ten Most Wanted Fugitives List. Aceto, after three years, was released into the Witness Protection program, but got involved in a series of burglaries and sent back to prison. In prison he killed a fellow inmate and was convicted of first degree murder, receiving a 25 year sentence. After being released, in May of 2000, he shot at a man named Rocky Hoerner at his Columbia Falls art gallery and kidnapped his former girlfriend, Eileen Holmquist, to which he was given a 220-year sentence. He died in prison in 2014.

Carlson was later arrested in his home and charged with interstate transportation of explosives with intent to injure or intimidate a person or damage property. In 1997, he was in prison for assault and kidnapping. In 1996, he was a potential suspect in a 1996 murder of a Fitchburg woman. In 2012 he was convicted of attacking a prostitute. In 2017 he was arrested on five counts of possession of oxycontin.

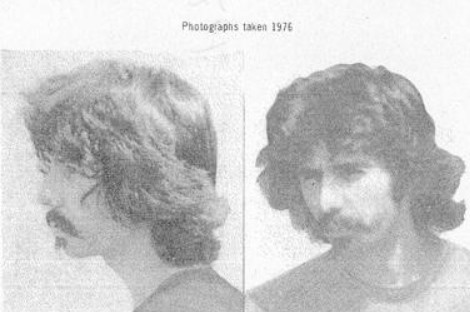
Richard Joseph Picariello FBI Most Wanted Poster (#343)

Richard Joseph Picariello became number 343 on the FBI Ten Most Wanted Fugitives List on July 29, 1976. He was arrested October 21, 1976 in Fall River, Massachusetts. He was convicted of interstate transportation of explosives and sentenced to 10 years in prison. The original three charges in relation to the other bombings were dismissed; the conviction stems from a separate case involving plans to bomb the A&P regional headquarters in Boston and the Polaroid Corp. headquarters in Cambridge. After being released he moved to Florida.

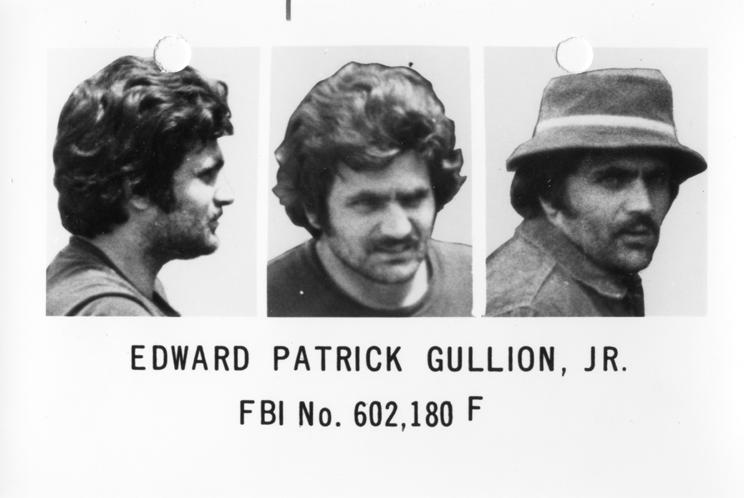
Edward Patrick Gullion Jr. FBI Most Wanted Poster (#344)

Edward Patrick Gullion became number 344 on the FBI Ten Most Wanted Fugitives list on August 13, 1976. He was arrested October 22, 1976 in Providence, Rhode Island, where he was employed at a jewelry store while trying to pick up a paycheck meant for Picariello. Not much is known after his release.

While on the run, Picariello and Gullion attempted to kidnap the Polaroid Corp. president William J. McCune Jr. at gunpoint. They would later be tried together in relation to the bombings. In 1979, the four men were ultimately convicted and given sentences of up to 15 years.
