= Morris Johnson =

American former bank robber and repeat prison escapee

Morris Lynn Johnson
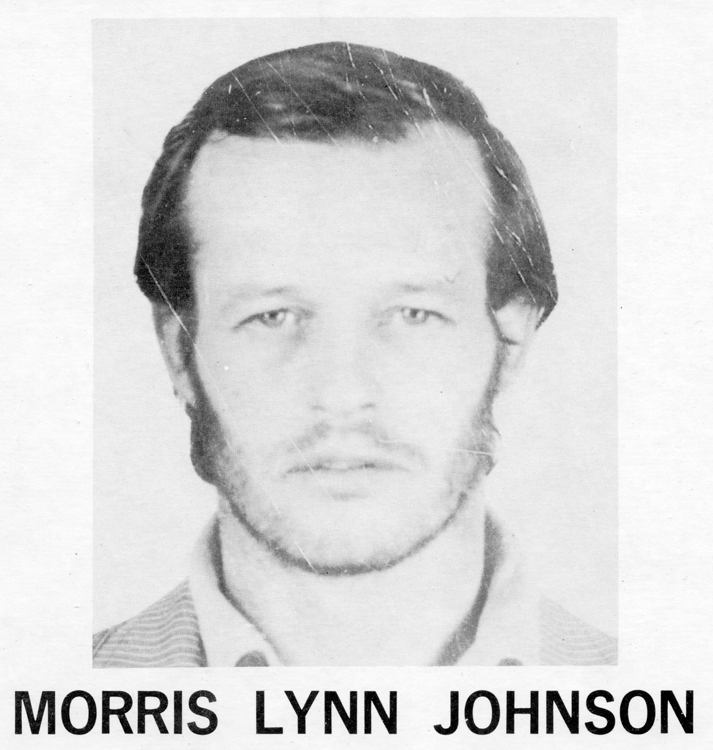

FBI Ten Most Wanted Fugitive

Description
- Born: October 24, 1937; Kentucky

Status
- Added: May 25, 1976
- Caught: June 26, 1976
- Number: 342
- Captured

Morris Lynn Johnson is a Kentucky-born criminal, whose crimes include armed robbery, escape and rescue, bank robbery (with assault), and assaulting a police officer. He was briefly listed on the FBI's Ten Most Wanted list in 1976.

== Early life ==
Morris Johnson was raised on a small farm outside Tompkinsville, Kentucky until his family moved to 4802 Beecher St. in the Drexel Gardens neighborhood of Indianapolis. Johnson's father Armer Johnson was a factory worker, and his mother Delcie Johnson was a short-order cook. Johnson had six siblings.

== Robbery Inc. ==
According to Indianapolis media accounts, by the age of 24 (1962) Johnson was the leader of one of the most notorious band of bank bandits since the days of John Dillinger. Also, it was alleged that by 1963 Johnson's gang, dubbed "Robbery Inc." by Indianapolis police, had grown to around 100 members and was believed to be responsible for nearly 3,400 crimes between the years 1958 and 1963. Close associates of Johnson have claimed these assessments to be overblown, however.

== Conviction ==
On April 10, 1963, a jury in Federal court at New Albany, Indiana convicted Johnson of robbing the Merchants National Bank and Trust Co. branch at 3119 English Ave. in Indianapolis of $8,890 in November 1962. Johnson drew an 18-year sentence for this crime and subsequently confessed to nearly 300 other major crimes.

== Escape ==
On November 9, 1966, Johnson escaped from the Federal Penitentiary in Atlanta, GA with another inmate by piecing together a rickety ladder made of scraps and thereby scaling a 40-foot (12-metre) wall. Only one other inmate had ever escaped this prison, nearly 40 years prior. Almost two months later, Morris and another man robbed the American Fletcher National Bank branch at 2122 East 10th Street for $10,375. They were caught the same day. Johnson pleaded guilty and was sentenced to another 5 years in prison, plus an additional 3 years for the escape, plus the remainder of his original 15-year sentence.

== Parole ==
In December 1973 Morris was paroled from McNeil Island Corrections Center. 18 months later, Johnson was arrested in Louisville, KY and charged with robbing a bank in Atlanta in March 1974 and burglarizing a bank in Marietta, GA in April 1974 in which he dug a 135-foot tunnel to enter the bank. He was then sent back to the Atlanta Penitentiary for 15 years.

== Second escape ==
On Saturday, October 25, 1975, at 9 a.m., Johnson and Solomon K. Allen Jr. scaled the wall to escape the Atlanta Penitentiary. This was Johnson's second escape from this prison, and these escapes were the only two in a 50-year period.

== Wife's arrest ==
On April 30, 1976, Johnson's wife Laurie Kay Johnson, 34, and Franklin Rance, 39, a longtime associate were arrested when agents raided an apartment in Long Beach, Mississippi in an attempt to capture Morris. Johnson and another man reportedly fled the apartment, exchanging shots with FBI agents and local police.

== Third escape ==
A year following his escape, Johnson was added to the FBI's Ten Most Wanted list on May 25, 1976. In less than a month, acting on an anonymous tip, federal agents captured him in New Orleans on June 26. Johnson then escaped from custody in Selma, Alabama on November 6. An accomplice sent hacksaw blades in the mail to Johnson, and the package had not been checked because it had a return address. Morris and five other prisoners sawed through the bars and fashioned a makeshift rope out of bed sheets to climb down to another part of the jail. On the ground level, they used an electrical cord to activate a device that controlled one door, and they broke a bar on another door to reach the outside. Morris was originally taken to this jail to testify in another trial. Johnson arrived at 2 p.m. that Saturday and escaped at 10 p.m. that same day; he had previously promised to send a message greeting his pursuers and, at Christmas, the judge and prosecutor in his court case as well as one of the FBI agents involved in his arrest received a card from Johnson which stated "I do my thing and you do your thing. If we should ever meet again, it's beautiful." Johnson was released in 2019.

== Man of the Year award ==
In 1976 Morris Johnson was nominated for the 1976 Indianapolis Star Man of the Year honor and was cited for "his initiative, intelligence and perseverance in dealing with the problems of prison security in our nation."

== Recapture ==
Morris was recaptured on May 11, 1977, in Burnsville, Minnesota and was incarcerated at the Federal Prison in Lexington, KY. He was released in 2019.

== See also ==
- List of fugitives from justice who disappeared
