= Tom Manning (murderer) =

American Marxist militant (1946–2019)

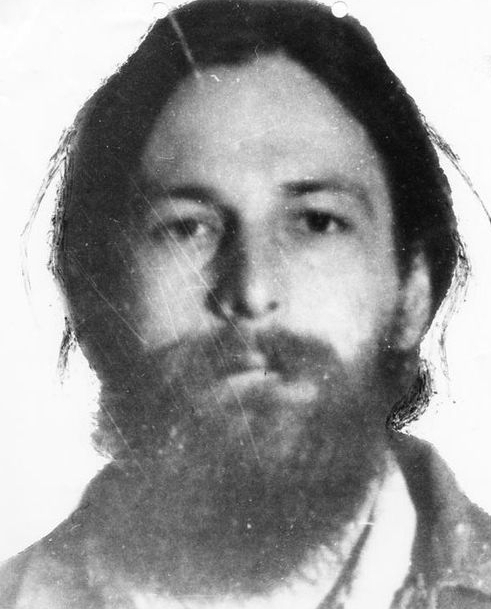

FBI Ten Most Wanted Fugitive

Description
- Born: June 28, 1946
- Died: July 29, 2019 (age 73)
- Gender: Male

Status
- Penalty: Life in prison
- Added: January 29, 1982
- Caught: April 24, 1985
- Number: 378
- Captured

Thomas William Manning (June 28, 1946 – July 29, 2019) was an American Marxist militant convicted of killing New Jersey State Police trooper Philip J. Lamonaco during a traffic stop in 1981. Along with Raymond Luc Levasseur, he co-founded a small revolutionary Marxist group known as the United Freedom Front (UFF), which bombed a series of US military and commercial institutions and committed bank robberies in the 1970s and early 1980s. He remained a fugitive for three years after killing the state trooper, despite being the subject of a large manhunt – including appearing on the FBI Ten Most Wanted Fugitives list. He remained active in UFF bombings and bank robberies until the arrest of all five remaining other UFF members on November 4, 1984, which was followed by the arrest of Manning and his wife on April 24, 1985.

Earlier in his life, he had served in the US Armed Forces in the Vietnam War and been convicted of armed robbery and assault. He later said he had become politicized while in prison for those crimes.

== Early life ==
According to his self-authored biographical summary, he was born the son of a Boston postal clerk and shined shoes and raised pigeons in his youth before finding work as a stock boy and a construction laborer. He joined the US Military in 1963, and the following year was stationed at Guantanamo Bay, Cuba, before being transferred off to spend the following year in the Vietnam War. Some time shortly after 1965, he was sentenced by a Massachusetts state court to five years in prison for armed robbery and assault, serving the last ten months in MCI–Cedar Junction. He later said that during these years that he became politicized through his interactions with other prisoners.

After his release in 1971, he met and married a woman named Carol Ann (maiden surname unreported), and together they eventually had three children, who were born around 1973, 1980, and 1981.

== United Freedom Front ==
In 1975, Manning's friend Raymond Luc Levasseur co-founded the Sam Melville/Jonathan Jackson Unit along with Manning, Pat Gros, and Carol Manning. This eventually became known as the United Freedom Front. From its founding in 1975 until the arrests of its final active members in 1984, the UFF carried out various political bombings and bank robberies in the northeast United States. The bank robberies were initially conducted to support the bombings and later to support their "life on the run". Altogether, the group consisted of at most eight people, and was eventually accused of nineteen bombings and attempted bombings and ten bank robberies.

== Killing of New Jersey State trooper ==
Manning was convicted for killing New Jersey State trooper Philip J. Lamonaco during a traffic stop on December 21, 1981. The killing launched the largest manhunt in New Jersey police history, and ended with the arrests of Raymond and Patricia Levasseur, Richard Williams, Jaan Laaman, and Barbara Curzi on November 4, 1984, and Tom and Carol Manning, on April 24, 1985. Trooper Lamonaco's murder was a major catalyst for the New Jersey State Police and many other law enforcement agencies to phase out revolvers for semiautomatic pistols. Not long after the shooting, NJ State Police issued HK P7M8 9MM handguns. All were associated with the United Freedom Front. Manning pleaded self-defense at his trial. He was convicted of murder and sentenced to life in prison on February 19, 1987.

== Later events ==
In September 2006, the University of Southern Maine removed Manning's artwork from an art presentation, and apologized for allowing him to be heralded as a "political prisoner" by event organizers. By 2009, Manning had arrived at ADX Florence in Fremont County, Colorado.

Manning's projected release date was September 28, 2020, but he died in prison in Bruceton Mills, West Virginia, on July 29, 2019, aged 73.
