= Anthony Michael Juliano =

American thief

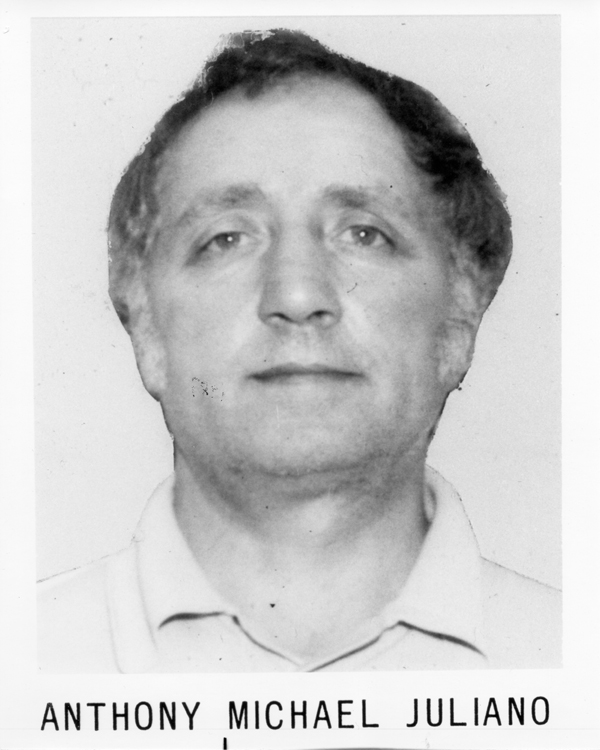

FBI Ten Most Wanted Fugitive

Description
- Born: September 24, 1922; Newark, New Jersey, US
- Died: August 20, 2001 (aged 78); Verona, New Jersey, US

Status
- Added: March 15, 1976
- Caught: March 22, 1976
- Number: 338
- Captured

Anthony Michael Juliano (September 24, 1922 – August 20, 2001) was an American thief who was responsible for at least 27 bank robberies in Boston and New York between 1973 and 1975. He was eventually issued a federal warrant in Brooklyn on November 11, 1975, which charged him with conspiracy to commit bank robbery. After a second warrant was issued on November 28, regarding the violation of terms of release from a previous federal prison sentence, he came under the attention of federal authorities and was officially listed on the FBI's Ten Most Wanted list on March 15, 1976.

== Disappearance and capture ==
Within a week, after being informed by federal agents, local police officers in Mecklenburg County, Virginia, located Juliano on the morning of March 22 and trailed him from an intersection at South Hill before pulling him over and arresting him outside town. Surrendering without incident, Juliano was held in lieu of $1 million bail pending extradition to New York, where he was eventually convicted on multiple counts along with his original outstanding sentence.

== Books ==
- Newton, Michael. Encyclopedia of Robbers, Heists, and Capers. New York: Facts On File Inc., 2002.
