= Earl Edwin Austin =

American criminal and bank robber

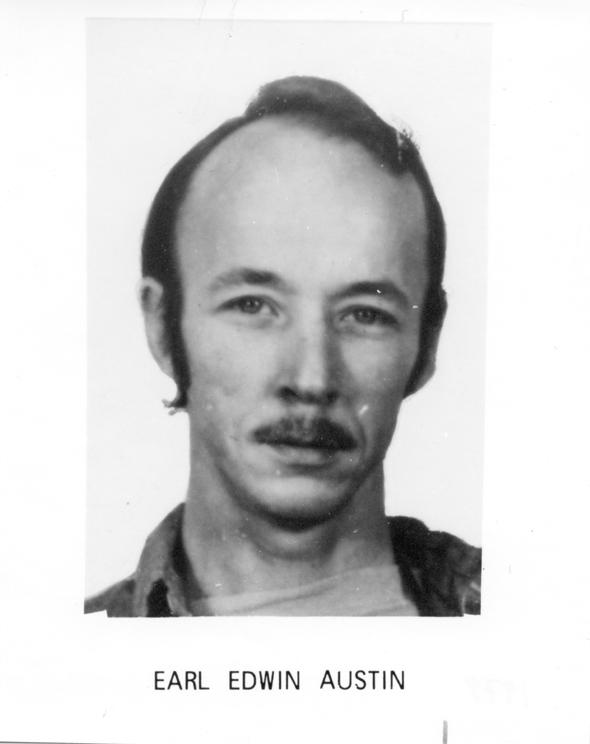

FBI Ten Most Wanted Fugitive

Description
- Born: Takoma Park, Maryland

Status
- Added: October 12, 1979
- Caught: March 1, 1980
- Number: 370
- Captured

Earl Edwin Austin was an American criminal and bank robber who had been listed on the FBI's "Ten Most Wanted" list during the 1970s.

== Background ==
Born in Takoma Park, Maryland, Austin had been a career criminal for much of his adult life serving sentences for grand larceny, forgery, aggravated assault, escaping prison and, most notably, threatening the president of the United States when Austin sent a threatening letter to then-President Lyndon Johnson as an inmate at the Idaho State Penitentiary (which would result in an additional five years to his sentence).

In February 1979, although having a history of attempted prison escapes and repeated altercations with police officers, Austin won parole from prison in Kansas City, Missouri and, upon his release, immediately headed south with the intentions of beginning a crime spree where, on February 28, Austin robbed a bank in Houston, Texas of $60,000.

By mid-July, Austin had raided a series of banks throughout the Southeast from Kentucky to Florida when federal authorities, who had previously charged Austin with bank robbery and unlawful flight to avoid prosecution, officially added Austin to the FBI's "Ten Most Wanted List" on October 12. He had robbed the Arapahoe National Bank by pretending to be an FDIC agent and making off with an estimated $250,000.

== Capture ==
After a five-month-long federal investigation, Austin was eventually traced to a rented apartment in Tucson, Arizona where Austin was arrested by federal agents on March 1, 1980. At the time of his arrest, Austin had a loaded pistol as well as $18,000 in his possession (a small amount of money from the Houston robbery had been marked, allowing Austin to be connected directly to the crime). Austin, charged with three counts of his three known robberies, was held in custody in lieu of a $35,000 bond before his eventual conviction and imprisonment.

== Books ==
- Newton, Michael. Encyclopedia of Robbers, Heists, and Capers. New York: Facts On File Inc., 2002.
