= Scarritt College =

College in Missouri, US

Scarritt College Neosho Collegiate Institute Scarritt Collegiate Institute
- Type: Private, Methodist Episcopal Church, South
- Established: 1878
- Location: Neosho, Missouri, USA
- Campus: Small Town

Scarritt College was a private college founded by the Methodist Episcopal Church, South, in 1878, in Neosho, Missouri.

== Neosho Seminary (1878–1880) ==
The Southwest Missouri Conference of the Methodist Episcopal Church, South, founded the school as Neosho Seminary in 1878. The Conference elected a board of trustees for the new seminary and the board bought a brick house to use as a school.

== Neosho Collegiate Institute (1880–1887) ==
In 1880, the name changed to Neosho Collegiate Institute. The school struggled financially, and by 1886 they reported to the Conference that they had $12,000 (equivalent to almost $384,000 in 2024) in debt.

In 1887, the Conference ordered the school board to work with Rev. Nathan Scarritt and two other reverends to liquidate the debt.

== Scarritt College (1887–1909) ==
Nathan Scarritt, D.D., of Kansas City, Missouri was a minister as well as a millionaire real estate developer and banker. He contributed $5,000 (equivalent to about $152,000 in 2024) to resolve the debt, and two other men provided for a new building. The school's name was changed to honor Scarritt.

In 1902, John Elward Brown (later founder of John Brown University) held a revival in Neosho and learned about the school Despite the infusion of money from Scarritt and others, it was struggling again. He asked to be president, and the board agreed. As the school president, Brown added some vocational courses to the curriculum, such as typing and shorthand, but the previous president (J.T. Pritchett), served as the dean and made most of the decision.

In 1903, the school closed during a smallpox epidemic. Enrollment numbers remained low after it reopened.

Brown spent his efforts promoting the school in his evangelical revivals, establishing the Neosho Chautauqua to bring speakers to the campus in the summer, and through the newspapers: he wrote for The Herald, a local weekly newspaper, and later bought the Neosho Free Press and merged the two papers. However, the number of students continued to decline and in January 1905 Brown stepped down.

The school never found good financial footing. For example, in 1893 the Conference had valued the school at $30,000 (equivalent to $1,023,000 in 2024). However, by 1909 the school had been effectively closed for several years and the Conference decided to sell its assets and merge the school with another one.

=== Missouri Supreme Court decision ===
During this time, William Edward Hall and his wife Martha Ellen Hall gave 1,600 acres (647.5 ha) of land in Texas to the Conference, to create an endowment for a learning institution in honor of their deceased son, John Winston Hall. Scarritt College created the endowment by selling the land for about $8,000. Over time and with interest, the endowment grew to about $14,000.

Scarritt College closed in 1909 with the creation of Scarritt-Morrisville College. The Hall family asked the Conference to divert the endowment to a fund to build a memorial church in honor of their son, in Carthage, Missouri. The Conference, which owned the church and school property, agreed. However, some of the Scarritt board of trustee members refused saying that when the money was originally given, the Halls specified that it be used for a learning institution, not a church.

In 1915, the Missouri Supreme Court ruled on this dispute (Catron v. Scarritt Collegiate Inst.), deciding that the endowment fund, which with time and interest was now $16,000 (equivalent to about $486,000 in 2024) should go to Morrisville-Scarritt College. It was used for the president's chair at that school.

== Morrisville-Scarritt College (1909–1924) ==
With the merger in 1909, all of Scarritt College's property was sold and proceeds plus the endowment given to Morrisville College (which had in earlier years been Ebenezer College) in Morrisville, Missouri. The combined school was named Morrisville-Scarritt College.

== Central Methodist College (1924–present) ==
In 1924, Morrisville-Scarritt College merged with Central Methodist College of Fayette, Missouri. Coincidentally, one of the founders of Central Methodist College in 1853 was Rev. Nathan Scarritt.

== Notes of interest ==
The Neosho School District purchased the property, and in 1916 the empty buildings were razed to make way for a new public high school for the city of Neosho.

Scarritt Collegiate Institute was attended by cowboy philosopher and humorist Will Rogers for a single semester in the late 1890s before his transfer to Kemper Military School in Boonville, Missouri.

== Notable alumni ==
- Harvey C. Clark, U.S. Army brigadier general
- E. LeBron Fairbanks, college and seminary president
- Sue Thrasher, activist, writer and educator
