= Edward Harrison DeArmond =

United States Army general

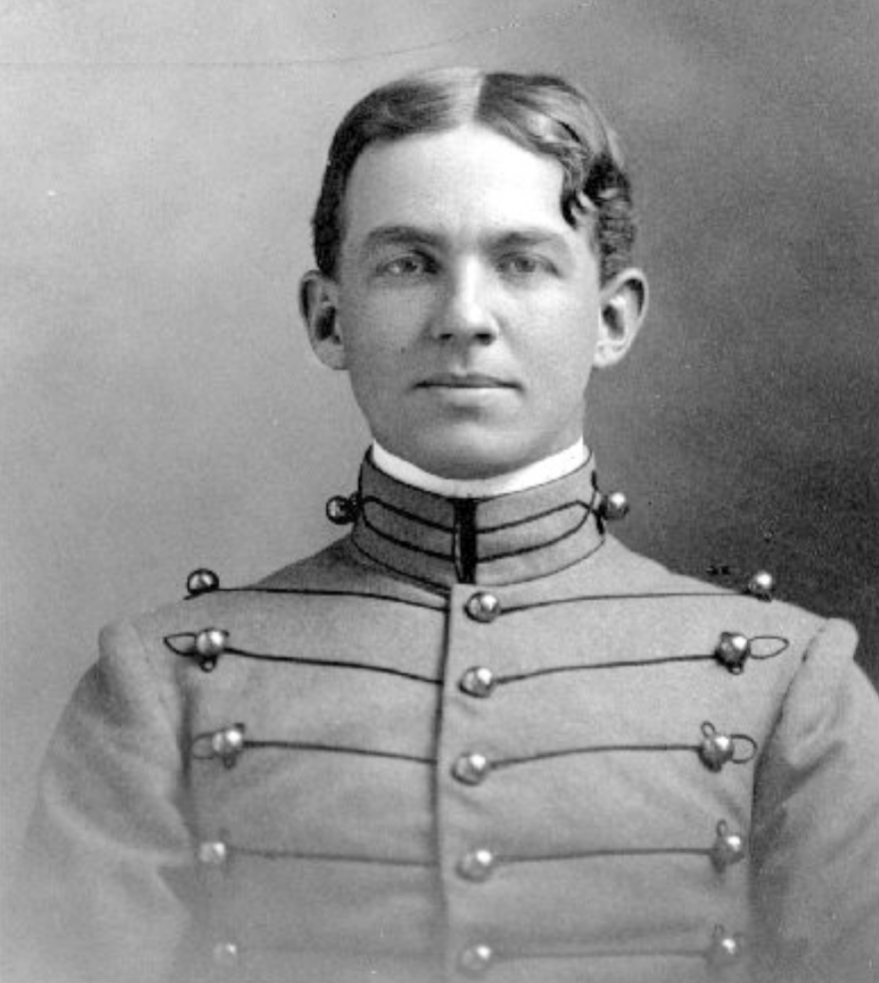
- At West Point in 1901
- Born: July 4, 1878; Greenfield, Missouri
- Died: October 21, 1948 (aged 70); Lexington, Virginia
- Military career
- Allegiance: United States
- Branch: United States Army
- Service years: 1901–1942
- Rank: Brigadier general
- Service number: 0-1351
- Conflicts: Moro Rebellion; World War I
- Awards: Distinguished Service Medal

Edward Harrison DeArmond (July 4, 1878 – October 21, 1948) was a United States Army officer in the early 20th century who was awarded the Distinguished Service Medal.

== Biography ==
DeArmond was born in Greenfield, Missouri, on July 4, 1878. He attended the United States Military Academy (USMA) at West Point, New York, from where he graduated forty-seventh in a class of seventy-four, in 1901 and was commissioned in the Artillery Corps, choosing to serve in the Field Artillery Branch when the former split in two in 1907. DeArmond served in the Philippines, participating in the U.S. Army's response to the Moro Rebellion in 1904. Between 1909 and 1912, he served in the Tactics Department of the U.S. Military Academy.

In World War I, DeArmond served as chief of staff of the 32nd Infantry Division during its training period and while in France between August 26, 1917, and May 1, 1918. After this, he became the chief of staff for the American Expeditionary Forces and was promoted to the rank of brigadier general on August 8, 1918. DeArmond was awarded the Distinguished Service Medal due to his performance as general.

From 1924 to 1928, DeArmond served at the Office of the Chief of Field Artillery, and later served in the Second United States Army as an artillery officer. Retiring from the Army at the rank of brigadier general in 1942, DeArmond died on October 21, 1948, in Lexington, Virginia.

== Bibliography ==
- Davis, Henry Blaine Jr. (1998). Generals in Khaki. Raleigh, North Carolina: Pentland Press. ISBN 1571970886. OCLC 40298151.
