= Raymond Luc Levasseur =

American militant and political prisoner (born 1946)

FBI Ten Most Wanted Fugitive

Description
- Born: October 10, 1946 (age 79); Portland, Maine, U.S.

Status
- Penalty: 45 years (sentenced 1989)
- Status: Paroled November 2004
- Added: May 5, 1977
- Caught: November 4, 1984
- Number: 350
- Captured

Raymond Luc Levasseur (born October 10, 1946) is an American militant who was the former leader of the United Freedom Front, a militant Marxist organization that conducted a series of bombings and bank robberies throughout the United States from 1976 to 1984, in protest to US intervention in Central America and around the world, racism, and the South African apartheid regime.

== Early life ==
Levausseur was born in southwest Maine, to French-Canadian immigrant parents from Quebec. Growing up, he experienced both poverty and bigotry, being called "frog", "papist", "lazy" and "stupid"—ethnic slurs and stereotypes targeting his French-Canadian background, French language, and Catholic upbringing.

Levausseur, his parents, and grandparents all worked in textile mills:

"My grandparents went to work in the textile mills at 13 and 14. My mother and father went into those mills at 16. My turn came at 17, when I misrepresented my age to a mill boss in order to work on a machine making shoe heels. From the earliest years I'd watched my family and predominantly French Canadian neighbors enter and leave the mills. Now I followed them into an exceedingly unpleasant experience."

— "My Blood Is Quebecois", 1992

In an essay written from Marion Prison in 1992 called "My Blood Is Quebecois", Levasseur recalls how, to him, "[my] French and class identity were inseparable," and "the roots of my political vision and militancy extend deep into life as a French Canadian worker."

At 18, Levasseur left Maine for Boston, where he found work as a dockworker.

In 1965, Levasseur enlisted in the United States Army, and was sent to Vietnam two years later, for a 12-month tour of duty. This experience began to radicalize him as the treatment and ridicule of the Vietnamese people and culture reminded him of the white supremacy he'd experienced growing up. He began to feel strong opposition to fighting against the Vietnamese, who he felt were struggling for their right to self-determination. In discussions and reading with a British anarchist in his unit, Levasseur developed a personal political analysis about imperialism and war.

After returning from Vietnam, Levasseur was honorably discharged, and moved to Tennessee, where he began attending college. There, he began working with the Southern Student Organizing Committee (SSOC), organizing with the student rights and labor movement, for civil rights, and against the war.

In 1969, Levasseur was arrested for attempting to sell six dollars' worth of marijuana to an undercover police officer. Levasseur was given the maximum penalty of five years in prison. He was sent to the Tennessee State Penitentiary, where he spent two years in solitary confinement. There he began studying revolutionary nationalism and socialism, reading the works of Marx, Lenin, Mao, Ho Chi Minh, Che, Malcom X, Fanon, and Bakunin, as well as literature and poetry. Levasseur became inspired by the activities of the Black Panther Party and the Front de Libération du Québec, and was frequently targeted by prison staff in retaliation for his engaging in political activity with Black prisoners, including for participating in a 1970 prison strike to protest spoiled food.

After his release in 1971, Levasseur moved back to Maine, where he attended the University of Maine, began working as a drug counselor. Drawing inspiration from the Black Panthers and Malcolm X, he recognized the importance of prisoners to social justice movements, and in 1972, Levasseur helped form the Statewide Correctional Alliance for Reform (SCAR), a prisoners'-rights organization. It is while working with these activist groups in Maine that Levasseur met his future wife, Pat Gros, as well as Tom Manning and his wife, Carol. Becoming convinced of the need for militant action, this group split from SCAR, and in August 1974, opened the radical bookshop Red Star North Bookstore in Portland, "selling radical literature and running a Marxist study group in the evenings, while being subject to intense police surveillance and threats of violence."

== United Freedom Front ==
In 1975 Levasseur co-founded the Sam Melville/Jonathan Jackson Unit with Pat Gros (now Rowbottom), Tom Manning, and Carol Manning, which renamed itself the United Freedom Front later the same year. From 1975 to 1984, the UFF carried out tens of bank robberies in the northeast United States, using the funds to support UFF bombing activities and later, to support themselves as fugitives. From 1975 to 1979, Levasseur and Manning robbed Brink's armored trucks to support intermittent UFF bombings.

From 1980 to 1981, Levasseur and Manning were not active, settling into a more stable lifestyle. In 1981, Levasseur and Gros move to a farmhouse outside Cambridge, New York living under fake identities. Levasseur recruited new members Richard Williams, Jaan Laaman, and Kazi Toure. With the new members, the UFF resumed bank robberies to support their bombing operations.

In 1983, it is believed by Levasseur that UFF associate Richard Williams shot and killed New Jersey State trooper Philip J. Lamonaco during a traffic stop. Tom Manning later claimed he fired the gun that killed Lamonaco in self defense. The death of Trooper Lamonaco led to several years of Levasseur, Gros, Manning, and other UFF associates living "on the run" from the FBI and state law enforcement agencies. A series of accidental "run-in's" occurred in 1982, and after each, the group would immediately abandon their current living situation, move, and take on new fake identities. Each move required further bank robberies to replace belongings abandoned after prior moves. Intermittently, Levasseur and the UFF conducted bombings targeted at corporations and institutions supporting the South African apartheid regime and US foreign policy in Central America.

== Arrest and trial ==
In 1983, the Boston FBI office formed the Bos-Luc Joint Terrorist Task Force in pursuit of the members of the UFF. On November 4, 1984, members of the Hostage Rescue Team (HRT) arrested Levasseur, 38, and Gros, 30, after their van was halted in Deerfield, Ohio. According to the special agents, Levasseur kicked an agent but otherwise surrendered without a struggle. A 9-millimeter pistol was found in the van, and the couple's three children (4, 6, and 8 at the time), who were in the van, were turned over to juvenile authorities.

Levasseur's trial statement, delivered on January 10, 1989, at the United States Courthouse in Springfield, Massachusetts, was published in book form titled Until All Are Free: The Trial Statement of Ray Luc Levasseur by Attack International in 1989. In it, he states: "I freely admit to being part of a revolutionary movement. The government cannot tolerate serious opposition to its own criminal policies, so they do what the prosecution are trying to do here. They want to criminalize my life, my values, and the organizations that they allege I've been part of."

== Conviction and imprisonment ==
Levasseur and six of his comrades were eventually convicted of conspiracy in 1989 and sentenced. In 1987 Levasseur and all seven members of the UFF were charged with seditious conspiracy and violations of the RICO act. The trial ended in an acquittal on most charges and a hung jury on the rest.

Levasseur was sentenced to 45 years in prison, and was sent immediately to the Control Unit (sometimes called a "segregation unit" for solitary confinement) of the supermax prison, USP Marion. The facility was "notorious as a ... place used, as one of its administrators wrote, to "control revolutionary attitudes in the prison system and society at large." While there, Levasseur refused to work for the prison labor corporation UNICOR producing weapons for the U.S. Department of Defense.

In 1994 he was transferred to ADX Florence in Colorado. Between USP Marion and ADX Florence, Levausseur spent a total of fifteen years in solitary confinement. In 1999 he was transferred to the Atlanta Federal Prison, where he was finally released from solitary confinement. Soon afterwards, he began to publish his writings on the website Letters from Exile.

Levasseur was released from prison on parole in November 2004, having served nearly half of his 45-year sentence. He returned to Maine after his release, where he lives. He continues to speak out in support of political prisoners and against solitary confinement.

== See also ==
- COINTELPRO
- George Jackson Brigade
- Black Liberation Army
- Political prisoners in the United States
- Left-wing terrorism
- Vanguardism
- Political violence
