= Jaan Laaman =

Estonian-American activist

Jaan Karl Laaman (born March 21, 1948) is an Estonia-born American political activist, most known for his conviction and imprisonment related to various charges including a 1982 attempted murder of a police officer. He was a member of the United Freedom Front.

Laaman grew up in Roxbury, Massachusetts and Buffalo, New York. His family emigrated to the United States from Estonia when he was a child. He had a son who died in 2011.

Laaman served a major portion of a 53-year prison sentence for his role in the bombings of United States government buildings while a member of the United Freedom Front, an American leftist group in the 1980s.

In the 1960s, Laaman worked in Students for a Democratic Society and community organizations and advocated against the Vietnam War and racism. As a student at the University of New Hampshire, he was a leader in the SDS. He was also a leader in the student strike in May 1970 in reaction to the bombing of Cambodia and the killing of six students during protests at Kent State University and Jackson State College.

He facilitated youth development in the Black Panther Party and the Puerto Rican Young Lords street gang. In 1972, he was arrested and charged with bombing a Richard Nixon re-election headquarters building and a police station in New Hampshire and was sentenced to 20 years. However, he was released in 1978. In 1979, he and Kazi Toure helped to organize the Amandla Festival of Unity to support an end to apartheid in Southern Africa, which featured musician Bob Marley.

He was eventually caught with several other members of the United Freedom Front, referred to as the Ohio 7, including leader Tom Manning, in 1984. While originally charged with seditious conspiracy, Laaman was found guilty of five bombings, one attempted bombing, and criminal conspiracy, and sentenced to 53 years in prison.

In 1977, an important New Hampshire State Supreme Court case was won by Laaman. Raymond Helgemoe was the warden of the New Hampshire State Prison. Laaman sued to receive reading material which he was refused. Helgemoe claimed that the material was radical, seditious, and even included bomb-making instructions. The New Hampshire Supreme Court, in a decision written by Hugh Bownes, decided in favor of Laaman, and this case eventually was used as a justification for offering college-level education in New Hampshire prisons for the first time.

Laaman was released on May 15, 2021.

== Writings ==
- Jan Laaman (Contr. Author) "This Country Must Change: Essays on the Necessity of Revolution in the USA" (Arissa Media Group, 2009). ISBN 978-0-9742884-7-5.
