= United Freedom Front =

American terrorist organization (1975–1984)

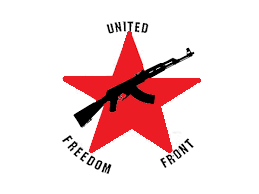
- Leaders: Raymond Luc Levasseur, Tom Manning
- Dates active: October 1975 – 1984
- Group: Ohio 7
- Active regions: Ohio and the Northeast of the United States
- Political position: New Left
- Size: ~10 militants
- Wars: the Opposition to United States involvement in the Vietnam War

The United Freedom Front (UFF) was a small American revolutionary organization active in the 1970s and 1980s. It was originally called the Sam Melville/Jonathan Jackson Unit, and its members became known as the Ohio 7 when they were brought to trial. Mainly led by Raymond Luc Levasseur and assisted by Tom Manning, between 1975 and 1984 the UFF carried out at least 20 bombings and ten bank robberies in the northeastern United States, targeting corporate buildings, courthouses, and military facilities associated with "South African Apartheid, imperialism, and corporate greed." Brent L. Smith describes them as "undoubtedly the most successful of the leftist terrorists of the 1970s and 1980s." The group's members were eventually apprehended and convicted of conspiracy, murder, attempted murder, and other charges.

== Activities ==
The group was founded in 1975 as the Sam Melville/Jonathan Jackson Unit, setting off a bomb at the Massachusetts State House under that name but changed its name to the United Freedom Front later that year. The initial members were Raymond Luc Levasseur and Tom Manning, and their respective spouses, Pat Gros and Carole Manning. Levasseur and Tom Manning were both Vietnam War veterans, first active in Veterans Against the War, and both spent time in prison. The four had worked together in civil rights and prison reform groups before forming the UFF. Four other members joined the group in the following years: Jaan Laaman and Barbara Curzi (another married couple), Kazi Toure (born Christopher King), and Richard Williams.

The UFF opposed US foreign policy in Central America, as well as South African apartheid. In March 1984, the group detonated a bomb after a warning call at an IBM building in Harrison, New York, in retaliation for the company's selling computer parts to the South African regime.

The UFF's targets included South African Airways, Union Carbide, IBM, Mobil, courthouses, and military facilities. The UFF called in warnings before all of its bombings, attempting to avoid casualties. However, 22 people were injured in one 1976 bombing at the Suffolk County Courthouse in Boston, including a courthouse worker who lost a leg. The group was most active in the early 1980s. The UFF's members lived undercover in middle-class suburbs.

The UFF funded most of its activities through its bank robberies. From 1974 to 1983, the UFF conducted ten bank robberies in the Northeast United States. Levasseur initially came up with the idea to rob Brink's armored trucks. Over time, the UFF transitioned to robbing banks. From 1980 to 1981, the group was not active, settling into a more stable lifestyle. In 1981, Levasseur and Gros move to a farmhouse outside Cambridge, New York living under fake identities. While living outside Cambridge, Levasseur recruited new members Richard Williams, Jaan Laaman, Barbara Curzi, and Kazi Toure. With the new members, the UFF resumed bank robberies to support bombing operations.

On December 21, 1981, New Jersey State Police trooper Philip J. Lamonaco was shot dead during a routine traffic stop of Thomas Manning and Richard Williams. Both Manning and Williams were charged with the murder of Lamonaco, alleged to have shot him eight times with a 9mm automatic pistol. Manning claimed he was alone in the car at the time of the shooting while the prosecution claimed Williams was present at the scene and was the shooter of Lamonaco.

The investigation of the group intensified after the killing of the police officer, leading a federal task force to be formed in 1983. Toure was captured in North Attleboro, Massachusetts in 1982, with two state troopers wounded in the course of the arrest. On November 4, 1984, police apprehended Levasseur and Gros near Deerfield, Ohio, and Laaman, Curzi, and Williams in Cleveland. Tom and Carole Manning were captured six months later in Norfolk, Virginia. Dr. Gus Martin, the author of a book on terrorism, wrote that the UFF was "the most enduring of all New Left terrorist groups of the era," evading capture for almost a decade.

== Trials and imprisonment ==
The UFF's members were tried repeatedly on various federal and state charges. In March 1986, seven of them (the so-called "Ohio Seven") were convicted of conspiracy, receiving sentences ranging from 15 to 53 years. In 1987, all eight members were charged with sedition and racketeering.

Eventually five accepted plea bargains, had charges against them dropped, or were tried separately. The trial of the remaining three ended in 1989 with an acquittal for sedition for all three and an acquittal for Patricia Levasseur (formerly Gros and now Rowbottom) for RICO Conspiracy and a deadlocked jury on the substantive racketeering charges. Thomas Manning and Richard Williams were given life sentences for the 1981 murder of state trooper Philip Lamonaco, and Laaman was convicted in the 1982 attempted murder of two state troopers. The activist defense lawyer William Kunstler represented UFF members in some of these proceedings.

Toure, Curzi, Gros, and Carole Manning were released during the 1990s, and Levasseur was released on parole in November 2004. Williams died in prison in December 2005, Tom Manning died in prison in July 2019 and Laaman was released in May 2021.

== Legal cases ==
- USA v. Patricia Gros: 84-CR-0222
- USA v. Raymond Luc Levasseur et al.: 86-CR-180

== In popular media ==
- In an episode of The FBI Files, "Radical Agenda" the FBI investigation of the United Freedom Front was featured and dramatized.
- In a made-for-television movie, In The Line Of Duty: Hunt For Justice, 1995, the murder of Trooper Philip Lamonaco was featured, as was the investigation into, and arrests of the members of the terrorist organization the United Freedom Front.

== Further reference ==
- Smith, Brent L. (1994). Terrorism in America: pipe bombs and pipe dreams. SUNY Press. ISBN 9780791417607.
- Burrough, Bryan (2015). Days of Rage - America's Radical Underground, the FBI, and the Forgotten Age of Revolutionary Violence. Penguin Publishing Group. ISBN 9780143107972.
- Rick Hampson (September 27, 1984). "After 13 Bombings, FBI Says Terrorists Remain a Mystery". Associated Press.
