= List of bank robbers and robberies =

This is a list of bank robberies, bank robbers and gangs involved in bank robberies.

== Australia ==
Robbers

- Brenden Abbott
- Christopher Binse
- Joe Byrne
- Darcy Dugan
- Keith Faure
- Gardiner–Hall gang
- Steve Hart
- Dan Kelly
- Ned Kelly
- Victor Peirce
- Gregory David Roberts
- Ronald Ryan
- Squizzy Taylor

Robberies

- Bank of Australia robbery
- 1984 Sydney bank robbery
- Great Bookie robbery
- 1978 Murwillumbah bank robbery

== Austria ==
- Johann Kastenberger

== Canada ==
Robbers

- Edwin Alonzo Boyd
- Roger Caron
- Ty Conn
- Ivan Grose
- John Hamilton
- Ken Leishman
- Paddy Mitchell
- Kevin Pinto
- Monica Proietti
- Stephen Reid
- Norman Ryan
- Jeffrey Shuman
- Garrett Brock Trapnell
- Front de libération du Québec

Robberies

- Shubenacadie bank robbery (1932)
- Havelock Bank Robbery (1961)
- Virginiatown bank robbery (1972)
- Saanich shootout (2022)
- Toronto Pearson International Airport heist (2023)

== China ==
- Agricultural Bank of China robbery

== Czech Republic ==
- 2007 Prague G4S heist

== Denmark ==
The first bank robbery in Denmark occurred August 18, 1913 in the bank Sparekassen for København og Omegn at Østerbro in Copenhagen. It was carried out by two men, Danish salesman Lindorff Larsen and a German machinist Güttig, armed with revolvers; the two got away with 9000 Danish kroner. Güttig was arrested August 30 and Lindorff Larsen committed suicide after having fled the police.

== Finland ==
- 1906 Helsinki bank robbery
- Mikkeli hostage crisis

== France ==
Robbers

- The Bonnot gang (La Bande à Bonnot)
- Jacques Mesrine
- Albert Spaggiari

Robberies

- Bank of France, 1986, Saint-Nazaire, $11.4 million.
- Bank of France, 1992, Toulon, 160 million francs (€30 million).
- Caisse d'Espargne bank, 1980, Paris, $11.5 million.
- Société Générale S.A, 1976, 46 million francs (€29 million)
- Louvre heist, 2025, €88 million
- Musée Renoir theft, 2026, €9 million

== Georgia ==
- 1907 Tiflis bank robbery
- Jaba Ioseliani

== Germany ==
Robbers

- Red Army Faction
- Andreas Baader

Robberies

- Gladbeck hostage crisis after a DM 300,000 bank robbery by Dieter Degowski and Hans-Jürgen Rösner on August 16, 1988
- Dresden Green Vault burglary, royal jewelry estimating €113 million was stolen from the Green Vault museum within Dresden Castle in 2019
- 2025 Gelsenkirchen heist, an estimated €30 million stolen from a Sparkasse bank in Gelsenkirchen

== Hungary ==
Robbers

- Attila Ambrus

== India ==
In 1987, Labh Singh (Sukhdev Singh Dhillon) allegedly masterminded what was at that time the largest bank robbery in Indian history, netting almost 60 million (58 million rupees-US$4.5 million) from Millar Ganj branch of Punjab National Bank, Ludhiana; a part of this stolen money belonged to the Reserve Bank of India, India's central bank. It was documented as "Biggest Bank Robbery" under "Curiosities and wonders" in Limca Book of Records.

The Chicago Sun-Times reported that "12 to 15 Sikhs dressed as policemen and armed with submachine guns and rifles escaped with nearly $4.5 million in the biggest bank robbery in Indian history." "No one was injured." A Police spokesman described it as "a neat and clean operation".

Khalistan Commando Force members who allegedly participated in the robbery included Harjinder Singh Jinda, Mathra Singh, Paramjit Singh Panjwar, Satnam Singh Bawa, Gurnam Singh Bundala, Sukhdev Singh Sukha, Daljit Singh Bittu, Gursharan Singh Gamma and Pritpal Singh.

== Israel ==
- Ronnie Leibowitz

== Japan ==
Robbers

- Sadamichi Hirasawa (controversial conviction in bank robbery that killed 12 people by poisoning)

Robberies

- 294,307,500 yen was stolen from the Nippon Trust Bank December 10, 1968 by man impersonating police officer. The case remains unsolved.
- 540 million yen robbery incident in Fukutoku Bank Kobe branch, August 1994.
- 600 million yen robbery incident in Tachikawa, Tokyo, May 2011.

== Lebanon ==
- The British Bank of the Middle East in January 1976 in Beirut, £25 million, the equivalent of £162 million in March 2024. This bank robbery was executed by the PLO.

== Malta ==
- HSBC, 2007, 1 million euros.

== Netherlands ==
Robbers

- Hans Gruyters

Robberies

- 2025 Drents Museum heist, approximately €6 million in golden artifacts. As of April 2026, a helmet and two of the three stolen bracelets have been recovered.

== Nigeria ==
- Lawrence Anini
- Ishola Oyenusi

== Norway ==
- NOKAS robbery - The biggest bank robbery in Norwegian history

== Pakistan ==
- ABL Karachi, December 13, 2009, 311 million rupees was looted from the Allied Bank Limited (ABL)'s head office.

== Poland ==
- Wołów bank robbery - the largest bank robbery in Polish history.
- Operation Góral

== Portugal ==
- Espírito Santo Bank of Campolide robbery - most mediated bank robbery in Portuguese history

== Republic of Ireland ==
Robbers

- Martin Cahill
- Gerry Hutch
- Kenneth Littlejohn

Robberies

- Bank of Ireland robbery

== Romania ==
- Ioanid Gang

== Russia ==
- Grigory Kotovsky

== Slovenia ==
On the night of October 31, 2005, robbers entered the safety deposit boxes of SKB Bank (Société Générale) in Ljubljana through the main door and deactivated the alarm system. Robbers disarmed the security guard and opened more than 400 safety deposit boxes. They took at least €32 million in gold, precious stones and cash.

In March 2012 two robbers were arrested. One of them was a security guard at the bank. The court process against two robbers started in November 2013. At least one robber is still free.

== Serbia ==
- Željko Ražnatović
- Pink Panthers

== Spain ==
- José Juan Martínez Gómez

== Sweden ==
Robbers

- Clark Olofsson
- Jackie Arklöv
- Jan-Erik Olsson
- John Ausonius – The Laser Man killer and convicted bank robber.

Robberies

- The Norrmalmstorg Robbery
- Västberga helicopter robbery

== United Kingdom ==
Robbers

- Ronald Biggs
- Ronald Christopher "Buster" Edwards
- Brian Arthur Field
- Lee Murray
- Frankie Fraser
- Joey Pyle
- Bruce Richard Reynolds
- Charles Frederick Wilson
- Adrian Peart (Ginger)

Robberies

Name	Year	Location	Amount
Great Gold Robbery	1855	Between London and Folkestone, Kent	£12,000 (£1.1 million in 2025)
Great Pearl Robbery	1913	Hatton Garden, London	£150,000 (£15 million in 2025)
Eastcastle Street robbery	1952	Eastcastle Street, London	£287,000 (£7.2 million in 2025)
Great Train Robbery	1963	Mentmore, Buckinghamshire	£2.6 million (£47.5 million in 2025)
Baker Street robbery	1971	Baker Street, London	£3 million (£37.9 million in 2025)
Bank of America robbery	1975	Mayfair, London	£8 million (£68.3 million in 2025) stolen £500,000 (£3.9 million) recovered
Brink's-Mat robbery	1983	Heathrow International Trading Estate, London	£26 million (£88.4 million in 2025)
Knightsbridge Security Deposit robbery	1987	Knightsbridge, London	£40 million (£115.7 million in 2025)
City bonds robbery	1990	City of London, London	£291.9 million (£721.8 million in 2025)
Midland Bank Clearing Centre	1995	Salford, Greater Manchester	£6.6 million (£13.6 million in 2025)
Northern Bank robbery	2004	Belfast, Northern Ireland	£26.5 million (£47.8 million in 2025)
Securitas depot robbery	2006	Tonbridge, Kent	£53 million (£91.6 million in 2025)
Hatton Garden safe deposit burglary	2015	Hatton Garden, London	£14 million (£19.3 million in 2025)

== United States ==
=== Robbers ===
- Edward J. Adams
- Aryan Republican Army
  - Michael William Brescia
- John Ashley
- Earl Edwin Austin
- Jorge Ayala
- Harvey Bailey
- Arthur Barker
- Albert Bates
- Clyde Barrow, of Bonnie and Clyde
- Eddie Bentz
- Earl Best
- Naomi Betts
- Tyler Bingham
- George Birdwell
- Black Liberation Army
- Stanley Ray Bond
- Fred William Bowerman
- Christopher John Boyce
- Ford Bradshaw
- Al Brady
- Robert Brady
- Everett Bridgewater
- Joseph Brodak
- Henry Newton Brown
- Harry Brunette
- James J. Bulger
- Edward Bunker
- Fred Burke
- Donald Richard Bussmeyer
- Tommy Carroll
- Butch Cassidy, leader of the Hole in the Wall Gang
- John Paul Chase
- James Clark
- Jim Clark
- Russell Clark
- Archie Clement
- Theodore Cole and Ralph Roe
- Bernard Coy
- Joseph Paul Cretzer, formed the Cretzer-Kyle Gang
- Patrick Critton
- Pat Crowe
- William Daddano Sr.
- Emmett Dalton, principal of the Dalton Gang, 1890s
- Ed Davis
- Lawrence DeVol
- Bennie and Stella Dickson
- The Covenant, The Sword, and the Arm of the Lord
- John Dillinger
- Bill Doolin, 1890s
- Frederick Grant Dunn
- Earl Durand
- Egan's Rats
- Aussie Elliott
- Jeffrey and Jill Erickson
- Gilbert James Everett
- The Flathead gang
- Fleagle Gang
- Joseph Paul Franklin
- Rufus Franklin
- John Franzese
- Ralph Fults
- Charles Arthur "Pretty Boy" Floyd
- Geezer bandit
- George Jackson Brigade
- Russell Gibson
- Fred Goetz
- Eddie Green
- Carl Gugasian
- Granddad Bandit
- John Hamilton
- Clarence Hill
- Holden-Keating Gang
- Anthony Hathaway, "Cyborg Bandit" and "Elephant Man Bandit"
- Shon Hopwood
- Cora Hubbard
- J.L. Hunter
- Hunt-Gant Gang
- Phillip Hutchinson
- James-Younger Gang, 1866–1881
- Elmer H. Inman
- David Stanley Jacubanis
- Frank James, one of the two James Brothers
- Jesse James, the other member of the James Brothers pair
- Christopher Jeburk
- Charles E. Johnson
- Morris Johnson
- W. D. Jones
- Anthony Michael Juliano
- Alvin Karpis
- Tom Ketchum
- Machine Gun Kelly
- John Allen Kendrick
- Israel Keyes
- Ben Kilpatrick
- Herman Lamm
- Elzy Lay
- George Leonidas Leslie
- Robert Van Lewing
- Loan Ranger Bandit
- Harvey Logan
- Harry Longabaugh, known as "The Sundance Kid"
- James C. Lucas
- David Mack
- Carlos Marcello
- Christopher Magee
- Charles Makley
- Candice Rose Martinez, "The Cell Phone Bandit"
- Emil Mătăsăreanu & Larry Eugene Phillips, Jr., North Hollywood shootout
- William Matix & Michael Platt, 1986 FBI Miami shootout
- Mad Hatter (bank robber), 2006–2007
- May 19th Communist Organization
- McCanles gang, 1861
- Ben Golden McCollum
- Henry Methvin
- Midwest Bank Robbers, 1990s
- Vernon Miller
- William Miller
- Barry Mills
- Bugs Moran
- Joe "Pegleg" Morgan
- Frank Nash
- Salvatore Naturale
- Jay Wesley Neill
- George "Baby Face" Nelson
- Newton Gang
- Earl Northern
- Albert Frederick Nussbaum
- Joseph "Specs" O'Keefe
- The Order
  - David Lane
  - Robert Jay Matthews
- Bonnie Parker, of Bonnie and Clyde
- Burton Phillips
- Harry Pierpont
- The Piggy Bank Bandit - Identity still unknown (2021 Robber)
- Duane Earl Pope
- Katherine Ann Power
- Phineas Priesthood
- Gerhard Puff
- Reno Gang
- Kenneth "Speedy" Raulerson
- David "Chippy" Robinson
- Leslie Ibsen Rogge robbed a total of $2,000,000
- Verne Sankey
- Frank Sawyer
- Susan Edith Saxe
- John Paul Scott
- Scott "Hollywood" Scurlock
- Mutulu Shakur
- Ted Skeer
- Tommy Silverstein
- Edward Smith
- Luke Elliott Sommer
- Henry Starr
- Steady B
- The Stopwatch Gang
- Willie "The Actor" Sutton
- Symbionese Liberation Army
  - Patty Hearst
  - Donald DeFreeze
  - James Kilgore
  - Emily Harris
  - Sara Jane Olson
- Too Tall Bandit, identity unknown
- Robert Toye
- Trenchcoat Robbers
- Forrest Tucker
- Wilbur Underhill, Jr.
- United Freedom Front
- Homer Van Meter
- Clayton Waagner
- Donald Eugene Webb
- Wheaton Bandit
- Whittemore Gang
- Bobby Randell Wilcoxson
- Johnny Madison Williams Jr.
- John Wojtowicz
- The Wonderland Gang
- Adam Worth
- Jerry Lynn Young
- Cole Younger

=== Deadly US robberies ===
- Security Pacific Bank, Norco, California, 1980, deadly shootout between local law enforcement and five bank robbers
- Geronimo bank robbery in Geronimo, Oklahoma, 1984, resulted in the deaths of three bank employees and one customer
- 1986 FBI Miami shootout, deadly shootout between FBI and two bank robbers
- North Hollywood shootout, 1997, deadly shootout between local law enforcement and two bank robbers
- PNC Bank, Erie, Pennsylvania, 2003, robbery by pizza delivery man Brian Douglas Wells wearing a neck collar bomb

=== Large-value US robberies ===
- 1798 Bank of Pennsylvania heist - Philadelphia, Pennsylvania, 1798, $162,821 (over $3.1 million today)
- Ocean National Bank robbery, 1869, $768k, done by George Leonidas Leslie and carried out by himself and others.
- Northampton Bank robbery, 1876, $1.6 million ($26 million in 2019), done by George Leonidas Leslie and carried out by others.
- Manhattan Savings Institution robbery, 1878, $2.7 million ($83.4 million in 2025) including $12,000 in cash, with the rest in securities, done by George Leonidas Leslie and carried out by "Jimmy" Hope, Samuel Perris and others.
- Lincoln National Bank robbery, Lincoln, Nebraska, 1930, $2.7 million ($52 million in 2025) in cash and securities.
- United California Bank robbery, 1972, $9 million ($69.3 million in 2025) in cash and valuables.
- First National Bank of Arizona, Tucson, 1981, $3.3 million ($11.7 million in 2025) in cash.
- Seafirst Bank robbery, Lakewood, Washington, February 1997, $4.5 million ($8.9 million in 2025) in cash, done by the Trenchcoat Robbers.
- 1998 Bank of America robbery, 1998, $1.6 million ($3.2 million in 2025)
- 1978 Lufthansa heist, 1978, $5.875 million ($29 million in 2025)

== Uruguay ==
- Tupamaros
