= Raulerson =

Raulerson is a surname of English origin. Notable people with the surname include:

- Charles Raulerson (born 1964), American golfer
- Dan Raulerson (born 1957), American politician
- Jaclyn Raulerson (born 1990), American beauty pageant titleholder
- Kenneth Raulerson, American bank robber
- Lynn Raulerson (1937 - 2012), American plant biologist
