= Toye =

Toye is a surname. Notable people with the surname include:

- Alfred Toye (1897–1955), British World War I veteran
- Christy Toye (born 1983), Irish sportsperson
- Clive Toye (born 1932), British-American sports journalist
- Francis Toye (1883–1964), English music critic, teacher, writer and educational administrator
- Frederick E.O. Toye (born 1967), American television director and producer
- Geoffrey Toye (1889–1942), British conductor, composer and opera producer
- Joe Toye (1919–1995), American World War II veteran prominently featured in the book and TV miniseries Band of Brothers
- John Toye (c. 1936–1992), British presenter and newsreader
- John Toye (economist) (1942-2021), British economist
- Lori Toye, American New Age author
- Mason Toye (born 1998), American soccer player
- Patrice Toye (born 1967), Belgian film director
- Richard Toye (born 1973), British historian
- Robert Toye, American bank robber
- Wendy Toye (1917–2010), British dancer, stage and film director and actress
- William J. Toye (1931–2018), American art forger
- William Toye (author) (1926–2024), Canadian author, editor, and literary critic

== See also ==
- Toye, Kenning & Spencer
