= Too Tall =

"Too Tall" or "The Too Tall" may refer to:

- The Too Tall Bandit, unidentified serial bank robber
- Ed "Too Tall" Jones, American football player
- Too Tall Hall, American basketball player
