= Dan J. Marlowe =

American novelist

- Born: July 10, 1914; Lowell, Massachusetts, United States
- Died: August 26, 1986 (aged 72); Tarzana, California
- Occupation: Novelist
- Writing career
- Genre: crime fiction
- Notable work: The Name of the Game Is Death

Dan James Marlowe (July 10, 1914 – August 26, 1986) was an American writer of crime fiction. The Name of the Game Is Death (Fawcett Gold Medal Books, 1962), about a fast-shooting, casually violent bank robber, is both Marlowe's most popular and most critically acclaimed work. (Originally a one-off novel, it was later expanded into a series subtitled "Drake: The Man with Nobody's Face.") In 2005, Marlowe was praised as the "hardest of the hardboiled" by Stephen King.

Charles Kelly's Gunshots in Another Room: The Forgotten Life of Dan J. Marlowe (2012) tells the real-life story of Marlowe, his amnesia, and his entanglements with bank robber Albert Frederick Nussbaum and murderer Bobby Randell Wilcoxson.

== Works ==
=== Novels ===
| Year | Title | Series | Publisher |
|---|---|---|---|
| 1959 | Doorway to Death | Johnny Killain | Avon Publications, Inc. |
| 1959 | Killer with a Key | Johnny Killain | |
| 1960 | Doom Service | Johnny Killain | |
| 1960 | The Fatal Frails | Johnny Killain | |
| 1961 | Shake a Crooked Town | Johnny Killain | |
| 1961 | Backfire | | Berkley |
| 1962 | The Name of the Game is Death | Drake | Fawcett Gold Medal |
| 1963 | Strongarm | | Fawcett Gold Medal |
| 1964 | Never Live Twice | | Fawcett Gold Medal |
| 1965 | Death Deep Down | | Fawcett Gold Medal |
| 1966 | Four for the Money | | Fawcett Gold Medal |
| 1966 | The Vengeance Man | | Fawcett Gold Medal |
| 1967 | The Raven Is a Blood Red Bird | | Fawcett Gold Medal |
| 1967 | Route of the Red Gold | | Fawcett Gold Medal |
| 1969 | One Endless Hour | Drake | Fawcett Gold Medal |
| 1969 | Operation Fireball | Drake | Fawcett Gold Medal |
| 1970 | Operation Flashpoint | Drake | Fawcett Gold Medal |
| 1970 | Operation Overkill | Drake | Fawcett Gold Medal |
| 1971 | Operation Breakthrough | Drake | Fawcett Gold Medal |
| 1972 | Operation Checkmate | Drake | Fawcett Gold Medal |
| 1972 | Operation Drumfire | Drake | Fawcett Gold Medal |
| 1973 | Operation Stranglehold | Drake | Fawcett Gold Medal |
| 1973 | Operation Whiplash | Drake | Fawcett Gold Medal |
| 1974 | Operation Hammerlock | Drake | Fawcett Gold Medal |
| 1975 | Operation Deathmaker | Drake | Fawcett Gold Medal |
| 1976 | Operation Counterpunch | Drake | Fawcett Gold Medal |
| 1982 | Guerilla Games (credited as 'Gar Wilson') | Phoenix Force | Worldwide |

=== Fastback "easy readers" ===
- 1983: Janie
- 1984: No Witnesses, A Game for Fools
- 1985: Claire, The Comeback, Game Day, Redmond's Shot, Turk, Death in Any Language, Pension Plan
- 1986: Small Town Beat, No Loose Ends
- 1987: The Devlin Affair, Ship of Doom, Double the Glory, The Hitter, The Mudder, The Sixth Man, The Super Upset, Big-Top Tragedy, Deadly Torrent, Quake 8.1
