= Crime in Phoenix =

Crime in Phoenix has been declining since the 1990s.

== 1960s–1970s ==
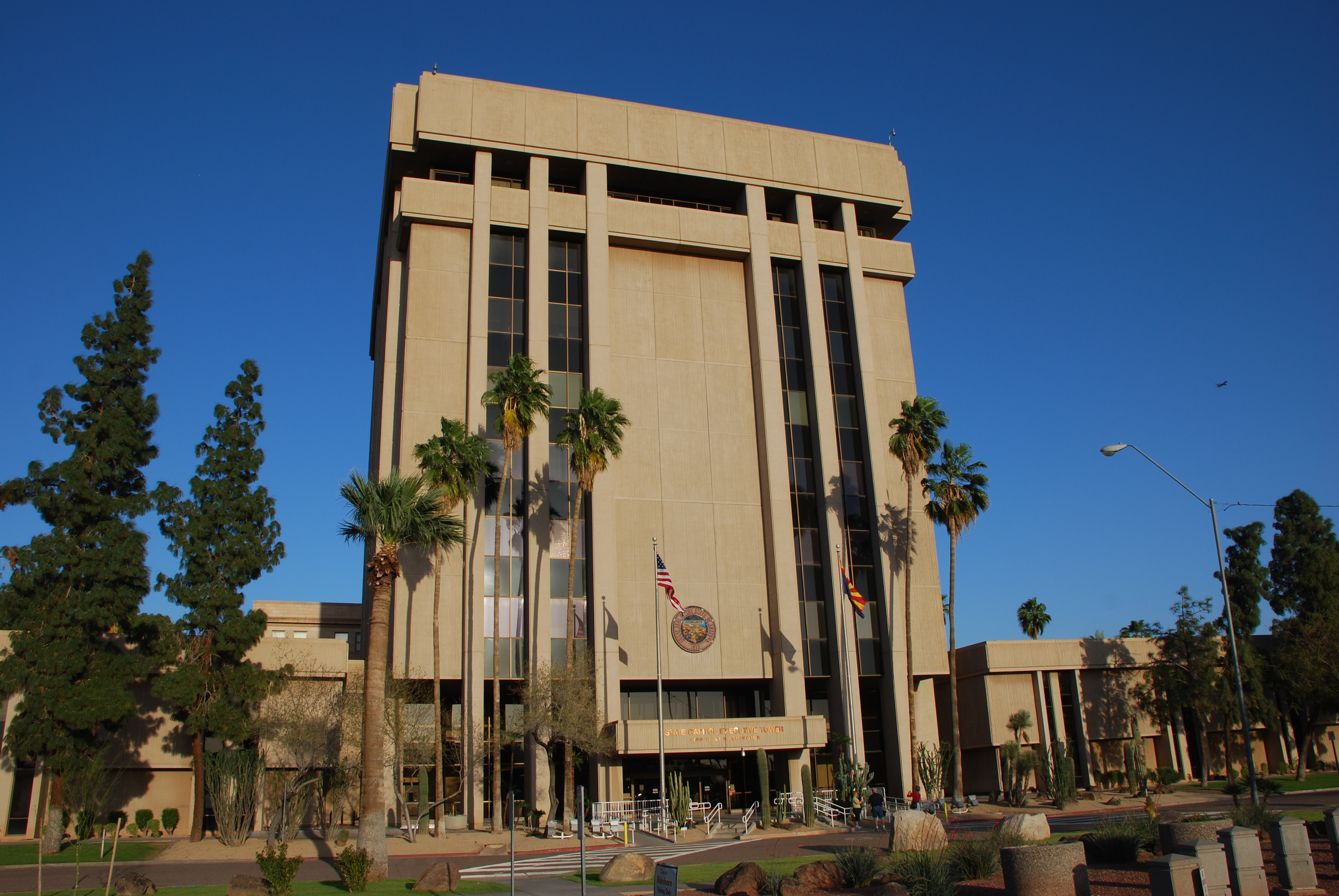
Arizona State Capitol Executive Tower

By the 1960s crime was becoming a significant problem in Phoenix, and by the 1970s crime continued to increase in the city at a faster rate than almost anywhere else in the country. It was during this time frame when an incident occurred in Phoenix which would have national implications. On March 16, 1963, Ernesto Miranda was arrested and charged with the rape of an 18-year-old woman with mild intellectual disabilities. The subsequent Supreme Court ruling on June 13, 1966, in the matter of Miranda v. Arizona, has led to practice in the United States of issuing a Miranda Warning to all suspected criminals.

By the mid 1970s, Phoenix was close to or at the top of the list for cities with the highest crime rate. The mayor during the mid-70s, Mayor Graham, introduced policies which raised Phoenix from near the bottom of the statistics regarding police officers per capita, to where it resided in the middle of the rankings. He also implemented other changes, including establishing a juvenile department within the police force. With Phoenix's rapid growth, it drew the attention of con men and racketeers, with one of the prime areas of activity being land fraud. The practice became so widespread that newspapers would refer to Phoenix as the Tainted Desert.

These land frauds led to one of the more infamous murders in the history of the valley, when Arizona Republic writer Don Bolles was murdered by a car bomb at the Clarendon Hotel in 1976. It was believed that his investigative reporting on organized crime and land fraud in Phoenix made him a target. Bolles' last words referred to Phoenix land and cattle magnate Kemper Marley, who was widely regarded to have ordered Bolles' murder, as well as John Harvey Adamson, who pleaded guilty to second-degree murder in 1977 in return for testimony against contractors Max Dunlap and James Robison.

The trial gained national attention since Bolles was the only reporter from a major U.S. newspaper to be murdered on U.S. soil due to his coverage of a story, and led to reporters from all over the country descending on Phoenix to cover his murder. Dunlap was convicted of first degree murder in the case in 1990 and remained in prison, until his death on July 21, 2009, while Robison was acquitted, but pleaded guilty to charges of soliciting violence against Adamson.

== 1980s–1990s ==
Street gangs and the drug trade had turned into public safety issues by the 1980s. Despite continued improvements in the size of the police force and other anti-crime measures, the crime rate in Phoenix continued to grow, albeit at a lower growth rate than other southwestern cities.

After seeing a peak in the early and mid 1990s, the city has seen a general decrease in both the violent and property crime rates. 1993 saw the creation of "Tent City," by Sheriff Joe Arpaio, using inmate labor, to alleviate overcrowding in the Maricopa County Jail system, the fourth-largest in the country. The violent crime rate peaked in 1993 at 1,146 crimes per 100,000 people, while the property crime rate peaked a few years earlier, in 1989, at 9,966 crimes per 100,000.

== 2000–present ==
In the most recent numbers from the FBI (2012), those rates currently stand at 637 and 4,091, respectively. When compared to the other cities on the 10 most populated list, this ranks Phoenix 5th and 6th, respectively. Since their peak in 2003, murders have dropped from 241 to 123 in 2012. Assaults have also dropped from 7,800 in 1993 to 5,260 in 2012. In the 20 years since 1993, there have only been five years in which the violent crime rate has not declined.

The year 2012 was an anomaly to the general downward trend in violent crime in Phoenix, with the rates for every single violent crime, except rape, showing an increase. The murder rate increased by 15.4% and aggravated assaults jumped by 27%, while rapes were down by 2%. However, the property crime rate returned to the downward trend begun in the 1990s, after a slight uptick in the previous two years. Vehicle thefts, which have been perceived as a major issue in the Valley of the Sun for decades, saw a continuation of a downward trend begun over a decade ago. In 2001 Phoenix ranked first in the nation in vehicle thefts, with over 22,000 cars stolen that year. That continued in 2002, when car thefts rose to over 25,000, a rate of over 1,825 thefts per 100,000 people. It has declined every year since then, and last year stood at just over 480, a drop of almost 75% in the decade. According to the "Hot Spots" report put out by the National Insurance Crime Bureau (NICB), The Phoenix MSA has dropped to 70th in the nation in terms of car thefts in 2012.

As the first decade of the new century came to a close, Arizona had become the gateway to the U.S. for drug trafficking. By 2009, seizures in Arizona amounted for approximately half of all Marijuana captured along the U.S.-Mexican border. Another crime issue related to the drug trade are kidnappings. In the late 2000s, Phoenix earned the title "Kidnapping capital of the USA". The majority of the kidnapped are believed to be victims of human smuggling, or related to illegal drug trade, while the kidnappers are believed to be part of Mexican drug cartels, particularly the Sinaloa cartel.

In August and September 2015, the Phoenix freeway shootings led to a number of cars being shot at on Interstate 10 in the city.

Between December 2020 to February 2021, the Piggy Bank Bandit robbed 6 banks in the Phoenix, Arizona area.

== Statistics ==
Violent crime in Phoenix 1985–2013

Year	Total	Murder	Rape	Robbery	Assault	Violent Crime Rate	Murder Rate	Rape Rate	Robbery Rate	Assault Rate
1985	7,521	89	635	2,425	4,372	844	10	71.3	272.2	490.8
1986	9,238	122	567	2,972	5,577	997	13.2	61.2	320.6	601.6
1987	8,181	111	503	2,287	5,280	877	11.9	53.9	245.1	565.8
1988	8,477	106	445	2,518	5,408	891	11.1	46.8	264.6	568.2
1989	8,481	126	399	2,615	5,341	900	13.4	42.4	277.6	567
1990	10,665	128	512	3,383	6,642	1,085	13	52.1	344	675.4
1991	11,010	128	480	3,448	6,954	1,106	12.9	48.2	346.2	698.3
1992	10,907	136	476	3,140	7,155	1,091	13.6	47.6	314	715.6
1993	11,911	158	444	3,437	7,872	1,146	15.2	42.7	330.7	757.4
1994	11,627	231	438	3,451	7,507	1,081	21.5	40.7	320.7	697.6
1995	11,590	214	411	3,693	7,272	1,068	19.7	37.9	340.1	669.8
1996	10,529	186	460	3,757	6,126	924	16.3	40.4	329.6	537.5
1997	10,376	175	428	3,725	6,048	885	14.9	36.5	317.7	515.8
1998	10,201	185	346	3,764	5,906	832	15.1	28.2	307.1	481.9
1999	10,199	214	400	3,819	5,766	832	17.5	32.6	311.5	470.4
2000	9,754	152	422	3,763	5,417	738	11.5	31.9	284.9	410.1
2001	10,532	209	400	4,629	5,294	771	15.3	29.3	338.7	387.4
2002	10,223	177	410	4,075	5,561	728	12.6	29.2	290	395.8
2003	9,722	241	526	3,676	5,279	693	17.2	37.5	262	376.2
2004	9,465	202	490	3,723	5,050	662	14.1	34.3	260.5	353.4
2005	10,691	220	533	4,237	5,701	729	15	36.4	289	388.8
2006	11,195	235	550	4,363	6,047	738	15.5	36.2	287.5	398.5
2007	11,158	212	509	4,942	5,495	723	13.8	33	320.6	356.4
2008	10,465	167	481	4,825	4,992	660	10.5	30.3	304.3	314.8
2009	8,730	122	522	3,757	4,329	547	7.6	32.7	235.2	271
2010	8,001	116	522	3,250	4,113	553.5	8	36.1	224.8	284.5
2011	8,089	116	559	3,324	4,090	552	7.9	38.1	226.7	279
2012	9,458	123	556	3,516	5,263	636.7	8.3	37.4	236.7	354.3
2013	9,492	118	635	3,233	5,506	622.0	7.7	41.6	211.9	360.8

Property crime in Phoenix 1985–2012

Year	Total	Burglary	Larceny	Auto Theft	Property Crime Rate	Burglary Rate	Larceny Rate	Auto Theft Rate
1985	75,002	23,346	46,743	4,913	8,420	2,621	5,248	552
1986	80,136	25,586	48,896	5,654	8,644	2,760	5,274	610
1987	75,779	21,185	48,700	5,894	8,121	2,270	5,219	632
1988	78,603	20,841	51,147	6,615	8,259	2,190	5,374	695
1989	93,878	23,013	58,160	12,705	9,966	2,443	6,174	1,349
1990	95,114	24,682	52,912	17,520	9,672	2,510	5,381	1,782
1991	88,162	24,219	47,338	16,605	8,853	2,432	4,753	1,667
1992	81,306	20,317	46,006	14,983	8,131	2,032	4,601	1,498
1993	84,565	20,617	48,382	15,566	8,136	1,984	4,655	1,498
1994	96,504	21,347	54,493	20,664	8,968	1,984	5,064	1,920
1995	106,536	20,953	62,422	23,161	9,813	1,930	5,749	2,133
1996	98,220	19,559	60,565	18,096	8,617	1,716	5,314	1,588
1997	102,281	21,027	61,635	19,619	8,723	1,793	5,257	1,673
1998	94,533	18,733	57,957	17,843	7,713	1,528	4,729	1,456
1999	84,442	15,927	50,556	17,959	6,888	1,299	4,124	1,465
2000	87,744	15,860	52,418	19,466	6,642	1,201	3,968	1,474
2001	94,443	16,673	55,190	22,580	6,911	1,220	4,039	1,652
2002	99,693	16,855	57,214	25,624	7,096	1,200	4,072	1,824
2003	97,823	17,104	55,068	25,651	6,971	1,219	3,924	1,828
2004	94,406	16,496	53,041	24,869	6,607	1,154	3,712	1,740
2005	93,328	16,255	52,537	24,536	6,365	1,109	3,583	1,673
2006	90,050	16,150	49,811	24,089	5,934	1,064	3,283	1,588
2007	89,825	19,212	49,754	20,859	5,826	1,246	3,227	1,353
2008	82,689	18,783	48,685	15,221	5,214	1,184	3,070	960
2009	65,617	16,281	39,643	9,693	4,108	1,019	2,482	607
2010	61,415	15,626	38,012	7,777	4,248	1,081	2,629	538
2011	64,479	18,666	38,258	7,555	4,398	1,273	2,610	515
2012	60,777	17,912	35,678	7,187	4,091	1,206	2,402	484
