= Granddad Bandit =

The Granddad Bandit (also known as the Grandpa Bandit) is a serial bank robber, notable for both his age and proficiency at robbing banks. From 2008 to 2010, he robbed at least 21 banks in the Eastern and Central United States. He was nicknamed the "Granddad Bandit" because of his age, appearance, and manner of dress. His method of robbery consists of quietly handing a note of demands to the teller, after which he departs the bank. Other than sometimes wearing a hat, he did not use any disguises during the robberies. He was wanted in 12 states and by the FBI. He surrendered peacefully on August 13, 2010 after a 6-hour standoff with police and FBI agents. He was positively identified as 52-year-old Michael Francis Mara. At 18, Mara was convicted of embezzlement, grand larceny and other charges. He also pretended to be a sheriff when he rented a car but never returned it. The so-called "Granddad Bandit" was once a suspect in the Colonial Parkway killings. In 1985, he robbed a bank in California. He was sentenced to 25 years in prison on May 11, 2011.
