= Too Tall Bandit =

American unidentified bank robber

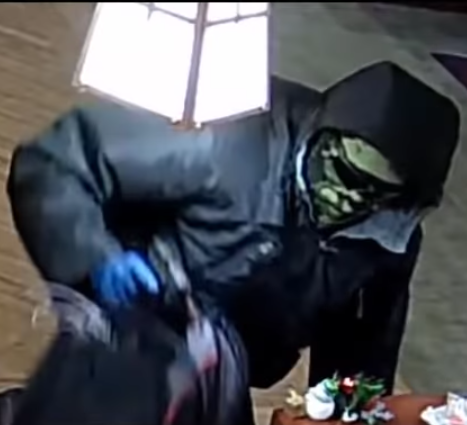
- Too Tall Bandit during a robbery
- Born: c. 1981
- Years active: 2009 – 2020
- Height: 6'0 – 6'8
- Criminal status: At large
- Reward amount: $15,000
- Wanted by: FBI
- Wanted since: 2009

Details
- Country: United States
- States: North Carolina; South Carolina; Tennessee

The Too Tall Bandit is an unidentified serial bank robber who is thought to be responsible for at least sixteen bank robberies in North Carolina, South Carolina, and Tennessee dating back to 2009. His nickname is derived from his height, which is estimated to be between 6'0 and 6'8 (183 – 203 centimeters).

== Robberies ==
In every robbery, the bandit was heavily disguised in a mask, coat, and sometimes gloves. He would enter the banks when they were about to close, walk behind or jump over the counter, and threaten the employees with a black handgun, which he held in his right hand. He then demanded that the employees help him put money from the vault or teller drawers into his bag or backpack. He asked the employees to point out bait money and dye packs, two security measures which could be used by law enforcement to track him down. Then, he orders the workers to lie on the floor as he flees the scene.

The perpetrator usually robs banks in rural areas near forests. The bandit has never been seen using a getaway vehicle, so authorities believe he may live near the banks he robs.

In addition to bank robberies, the bandit is also suspected of robbing the Farragut Pharmacy in Farragut, Tennessee, on December 18, 2014. In that case, he stole opioids instead of money.

=== List of robberies ===
Date	State	City	Address	Bank
November 27, 2009	Tennessee	White House	2920 Highway 31 W	Volunteer State Bank
November 12, 2010	Tennessee	Gallatin	780 Browns Lane	Sumner Bank & Trust
November 9, 2012	Tennessee	Franklin	731 Cool Springs Blvd.	SunTrust Bank
March 31, 2014	Tennessee	Farragut	11864 Kingston Pike	First Tennessee Bank
November 24, 2014	Tennessee	Jefferson City	156 East Broadway Blvd.	Tri-Summit Bank
December 18, 2014	Tennessee	Farragut		Farragut Pharmacy
November 13, 2015	Tennessee	Pigeon Forge	3671 Parkway	Home Federal Bank
October 27, 2016	Tennessee	Knoxville	136 Concord Road	Capital Bank
November 16, 2016	North Carolina	Arden	140 Airport Road	Home Trust Bank
November 25, 2016	South Carolina	Lyman	104 Edgewood Street	First Citizens Bank
November 17, 2017	Tennessee	Jefferson City	263 East Broadway Blvd.	BB&T Bank
November 24, 2017	Tennessee	Knoxville	813 Huckleberry Lane	Citizen's National Bank
October 26, 2018	North Carolina	Concord	818 Church Street	BB&T Bank
December 21, 2018	North Carolina	Asheville	850 Merrimon Avenue	BB&T Bank
January 4, 2019	Tennessee	Franklin	731 Cool Springs Blvd.	SunTrust Bank
November 6, 2020	North Carolina	Brevard	2 Market Street	First Bank
November 27, 2020	North Carolina	Etowah	50 United Bank Drive	United Community Bank

== Appearance ==
The Too Tall Bandit is believed to be between 6 feet and 6'6 tall by the FBI. However, some witnesses have described him as being as tall as 6'8. He also weighs between 210 and 250 pounds and walks with a limp on his right leg. Additionally, he has a deep voice.

In every robbery, the perpetrator used a disguise to cover his face. Sometimes he used a Halloween-style mask. Other times, he wore a balaclava, which exposed his brown eyes. In many of the robberies, the bandit used gloves. However, sometimes he did not, revealing his seemingly white skin color.

== See also ==
- Geezer Bandit
- Piggy Bank Bandit
- Wheaton Bandit
