= Loan Ranger Bandit =

American bank robber

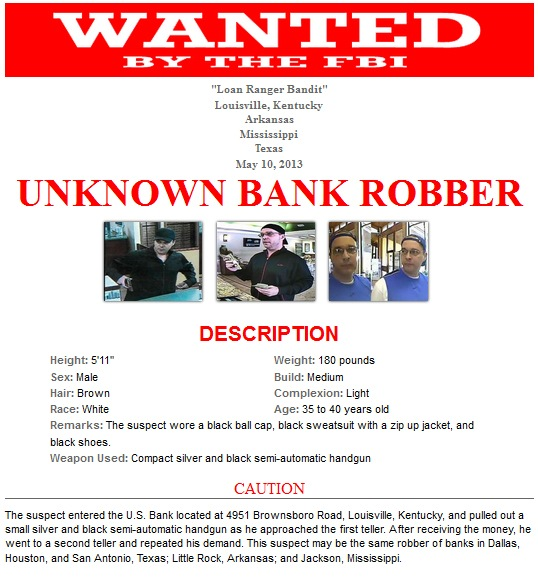
FBI wanted poster

The Loan Ranger Bandit is an American bank robber who committed a series of bank robberies throughout the states of Texas, Mississippi, Kentucky, and Arkansas, beginning in 2009. The Loan Ranger Bandit has been positively identified as 37-year-old Richard Swicegood of Waxahachie, Texas, following a traffic stop by Arkansas State Police in early July 2014. The traffic stop followed a robbery of the Summit Bank in Benton, Arkansas on July 1, 2014, believed to have been committed by Swicegood.

The robber is responsible for at least ten separate bank robberies, according to the FBI. In addition, the FBI's major case hotline cites a number of initial options to a caller, one of which is for those seeking to provide information to the FBI on the Loan Ranger Bandit. On March 11, 2015, a federal judge sentenced 38-year-old Richard Wayne Swicegood of Waxahachie, Texas, to 40 years in federal prison for committing 13 armed bank robberies in Texas and Arkansas.
