= Albert Frederick Nussbaum =

American writer and bank robber

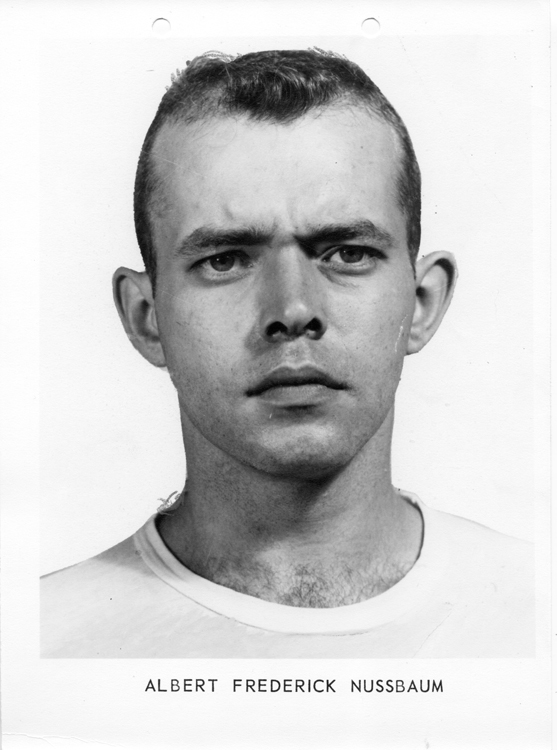

FBI Ten Most Wanted Fugitive
- Charges: Bank robbery Murder

Description
- Born: April 9, 1934; Buffalo, New York
- Died: January 7, 1996 (aged 61)

Status
- Added: April 3, 1962
- Caught: November 4, 1962
- Number: 168
- Captured

Albert Frederick Nussbaum (April 9, 1934 – January 7, 1996) was a notorious 1960s-era bank robber and FBI Ten Most Wanted Fugitive. Nussbaum was born in Buffalo, New York. In the late 1950s, Nussbaum was arrested for possessing a Thompson Submachine gun and transporting unregistered weapons across state lines.

Nussbaum was sentenced to the Federal Reformatory at Chillicothe, Ohio. There, he met Bobby Randell Wilcoxson, originally from Duke, Oklahoma, and Peter Columbus Curry, of Quitman, Georgia. Wilcoxson was doing time for buying a car with a bad check and then driving it across state lines.

Nussbaum was extremely intelligent. He regularly competed in top-tier chess tournaments by correspondence from his Ohio jail cell. He was also an expert photographer, locksmith and gunsmith, pilot, as well as an accomplished airplane mechanic, welder and a draftsman.

Writing under his own name as well as pseudonyms, Albert Nussbaum became a successful freelance journalist and writer of crime fiction and television screenplays.

== Bank robber ==
Within a year of leaving Chillicothe, Nussbaum and Wilcoxson hooked up in Buffalo, New York, with a plan to rob banks. The FBI would eventually label Nussbaum "the brains" of the team while Wilcoxson was marked as "the brawn." They knocked over a few local stores and service stations in Buffalo to raise seed money for an arsenal of weapons they would soon use robbing banks. Nussbaum and "One Eye" Wilcoxson allegedly robbed at least eight banks from 1960 to 1962, hauling in at least $250,000—roughly equivalent to $2.8 million as of 2008.

Nussbaum and Wilcoxson acquired deactivated military weapons called "Dewats". With parts they acquired by mail order, they refurbished the weapons. Their cache of munitions included revolvers, shotguns, submachineguns, hand grenades, M1 carbine military rifles and military-style armor-piercing anti-tank guns that could annihilate pursuing police cars or pierce bank vaults.

Nussbaum taught himself to make pipe bombs. He and Wilcoxson posed as "Mad Bombers," setting off two bombs in Washington DC on June 15 and 16, 1961. They made several telephone calls pretending to be southern white supremacists bombing the Capitol in protest of integration and the civil rights movement. The bombings were planned to distract law enforcement manpower near the White House so a Washington, D.C., bank could be easily robbed on June 30.

On December 15, 1961, Curry joined Wilcoxson and Nussbaum to rob a branch of the Lafayette National Bank in Brooklyn, New York. Wilcoxson entered the bank and killed guard Henry Kraus with four quick shots from a Thompson Submachine gun. Curry was arrested in front of his mother's house by the FBI in February, 1962. The FBI named Wilcoxson to the famous "Most Wanted List" on February 23, 1962, and Nussbaum on April 3, 1962. The FBI circulated over 1 million "wanted" posters and interviewed over 9,000 in New York state alone. The FBI declared the bandits as dangerous, warning the pair were armed with hand-grenades and 25 submachine guns. "They will not hesitate to open fire," the posters warned. 600 FBI agents searched worldwide for Nussbaum, Wilcoxson and Wilcoxson's 19-year-old "paramour," Jacqueline Ruth Rose of Paoli, Indiana, and Delray Beach, Florida.

On November 4, 1962, Nussbaum's mother-in-law informed the FBI that Nussbaum was in Buffalo to secretly visit his wife and infant daughter. More than 30 FBI cars surrounded the Statler Hilton Hotel at 1 am on November 4, 1962, as Nussbaum arrived, expecting to pick up his wife, Alicia Nussbaum somehow signaled her husband and he raced out of the hotel parking lot, leading a parade of FBI agents on a 100 mph chase through the cold, wet streets of Buffalo. A police dog catcher rammed Nussbaum's car and the FBI arrested him. Mid morning on November 10, 1962, Wilcoxson and Rose were captured in Baltimore, Maryland.

By May, 1963, Nussbaum pleaded guilty to the murder of bank guard Kraus and seven bank robberies. On February 8, 1964, Nussbaum was sentenced to 40 years in prison with eligibility for parole in 1971.

== Writer ==
While running from the FBI, Nussbaum needed to explain why he seldom left his room: He bought himself a portable typewriter and presented himself as a writer. He read The Name of The Game is Death, a crime novel by Dan J. Marlowe, a popular writer of the day. Nussbaum, using the name "Carl Fischer," called Marlowe's agent and sent Marlowe letters praising the realness of the book. Marlowe and Nussbaum remained friends while Nussbaum was imprisoned. Marlowe encouraged Nussbaum to write and the two often collaborated — Nussbaum providing Marlowe with professional criminal techniques that added even more realism to Marlowe's body of work.

While still in prison, Nussbaum began contributing to the Montreal-based film magazine Take One. In 1976 the magazine featured him in full-page advertisements, "The Pros and Con of Take One".

Nussbaum was paroled in the 1970s and lived with Marlowe, serving as his caretaker when Marlowe took ill.

Nussbaum wrote a lot, publishing as Albert Nussbaum and under at least a half-dozen pseudonyms including Carl Martin, Albert Avellano, A. F. Oreshnik and Alberto N. Martin. He specialized in mystery, crime and adventure stories. He published many short stories that appeared in Ellery Queen's Mystery Magazine, Alfred Hitchcock's Mystery Magazine and Alfred Hitchcock's Anthology.

Nussbaum published several novels. Gypsy, the most well known, was published by Scholastic Press under the title Motorcycle Racer. In the mid-1970s, Nussbaum wrote television scripts for Switch, a CBS crime series featuring Robert Wagner and Eddie Albert. In the 1980s, Nussbaum put on workshops for mystery writers at USC, and he was elected president of the Southern California chapter of the Mystery Writers of America.

Albert Fredrick Nussbaum died in 1996 at the age of 61.
