= 2009 Karachi bank robbery =

The 2009 Karachi bank robbery occurred on December 13, 2009 when robbers stole US$3.7 million from the main branch of Allied Bank in Karachi, Pakistan. It is considered the biggest bank robbery in history of Pakistan. Police say the gang was led by one of the bank's guards. The robbers broke into the main vault and stole foreign currency worth 10 billion rupees ($3.7 million).

The main culprit of the robbery was arrested by the police on 19 December 2009.
