= Colonial Parkway murders =

1986–1989 murders in Virginia, US

Alan Wade Wilmer
- Alan Wilmer in 1988; age 33
- Born: November 18, 1954; Lancaster County, Virginia, U.S.
- Died: December 15, 2017 (aged 63); Lancaster County, Virginia, U.S.
- Occupations: Fisherman, Hunter

Details
- Victims: 8 confirmed, 6 suspected
- Span of crimes: October 12, 1986 – September 5, 1989
- Country: United States
- State: Virginia

The Colonial Parkway murders were the serial murders of at least eight people in the U.S. state of Virginia between 1986 and 1989. The killings were associated with the Colonial Parkway, a twenty-three-mile-long thoroughfare that cuts through the Colonial National Historical Park and connects Jamestown, Williamsburg and Yorktown. The first two victims were discovered dead inside a vehicle found on the Parkway, as was an abandoned vehicle belonging to another couple who are missing and presumed dead.

Long stretches of the Colonial Parkway are devoid of any streetlights and are extremely isolated, making it a popular lovers' lane frequented by young adults. In each incident, a young couple sitting in a vehicle was targeted, with both partners killed. Three pairs of victims were recovered, and another couple remains missing and presumed dead. Several additional homicides have also been tentatively linked to the eight confirmed cases. The causes of death included strangulation, gunshot and stabbing. The killer drove victims’ vehicles away from the murder sites.

On January 8, 2024, authorities announced that at least three of the murders, namely those of David Knobling, Robin Edwards, and Teresa Howell, had been conclusively linked to an official suspect, Alan Wade "Pokey" Wilmer Sr., a local fisherman who had died in 2017. Nicknamed the Colonial Parkway Killer. On November 14, 2025, Wilmer was linked to a fourth murder, namely that of Laurie Ann Powell. On January 20, 2026, Wilmer was linked to two more murders, of Cathleen Thomas and Rebecca Dowski. On September 18th, 2026, the FBI announced that they had substantial evidence to link Wilmer to the killings of Richard "Keith" Call and Cassandra Lee Hailey, officially closing the case. Wilmer had been described as "suspect number one" in two of the canonical murders but was freed after passing an FBI polygraph test.

Despite his status as a serial killer suspected of other crimes, Wilmer's DNA was not entered into the Combined DNA Index System (CODIS), the United States' national DNA database. Victims' advocates have called for confirmed serial killers, like Wilmer, to have their DNA entered into CODIS.

== Confirmed and suspected victims ==
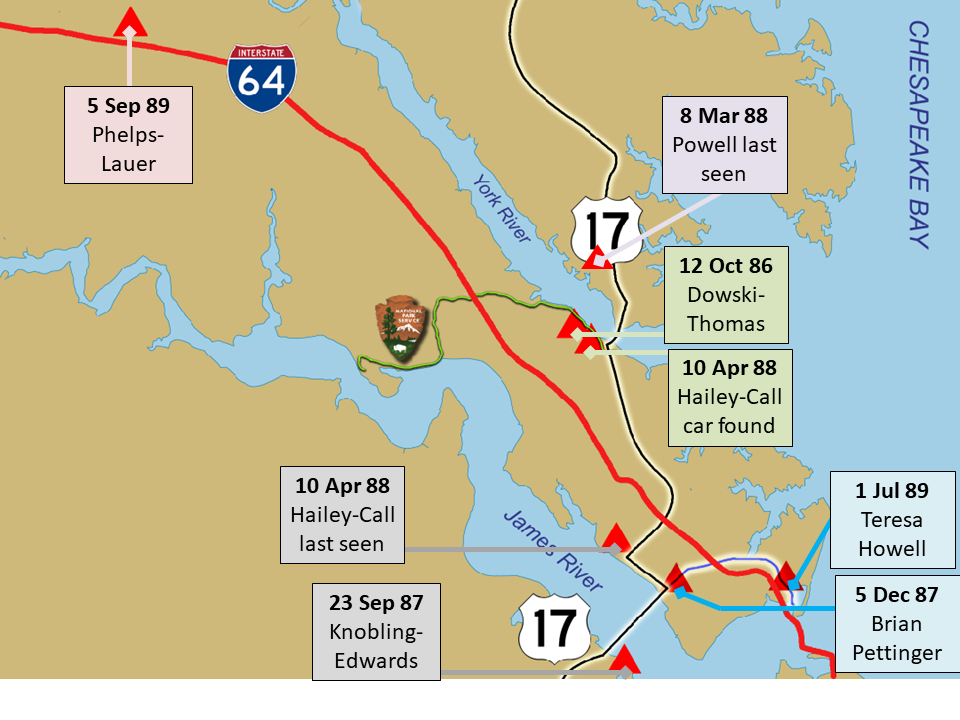
The Colonial Parkway (green) was the site of the Dowski-Thomas and the Hailey-Call vehicle recoveries. Powell and also Hailey-Call were last seen near Route 17 (black), the thoroughfare adjacent to site of the Knobling-Edwards murder and vehicle recovery. Two victims, first Pettinger and later Howell, were last seen on Mercury Boulevard (blue). A rest area on Interstate 64 (red) was the site of the Phelps-Lauer vehicle recovery; their bodies were found nearby.

=== Rebecca Dowski and Cathy Thomas ===
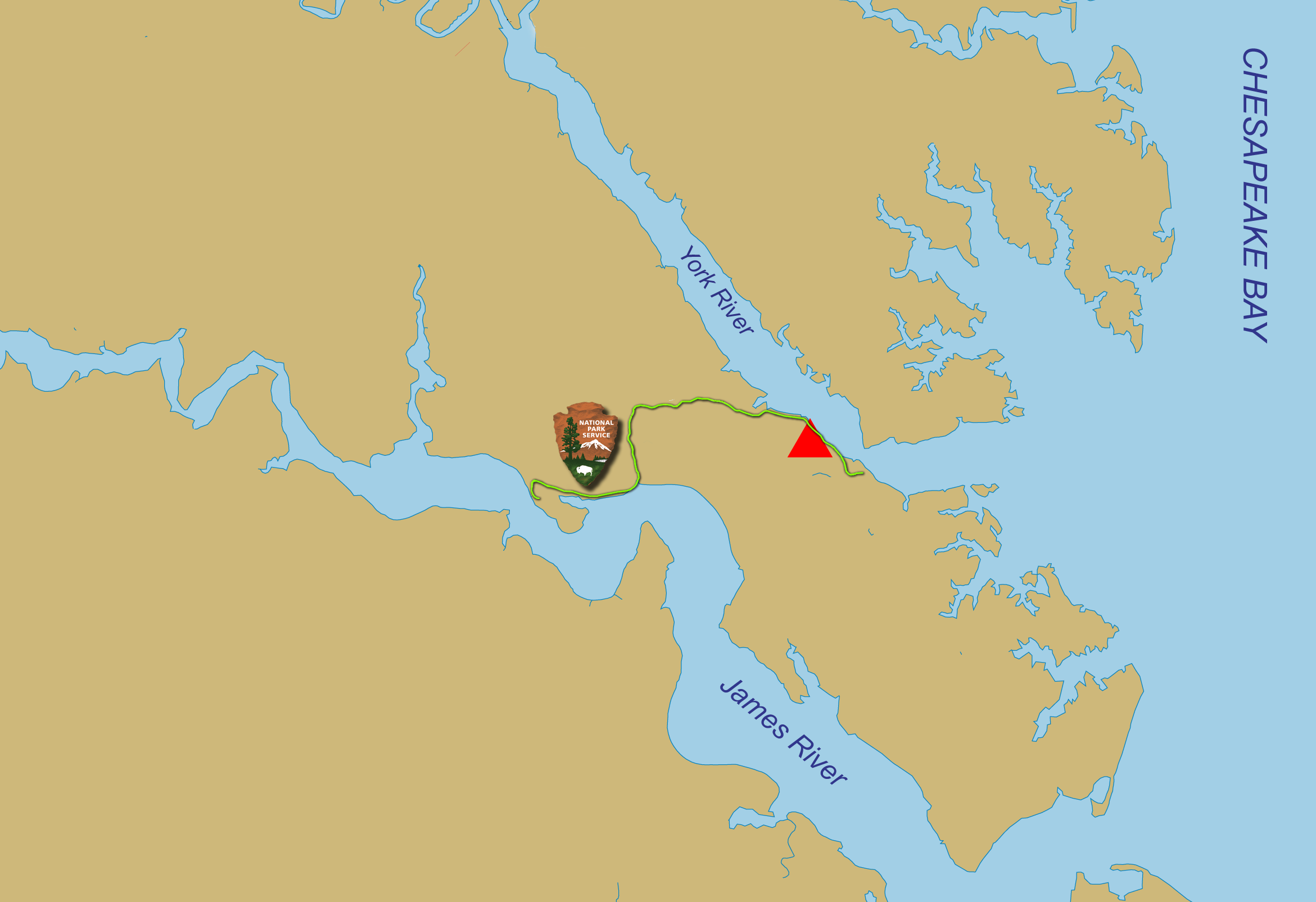
Site of the Dowski-Thomas murders on the Colonial Parkway

The first known victims in the Colonial Parkway killings were Cathleen Marian "Cathy" Thomas (27), a United States Naval Academy graduate, and College of William & Mary senior Rebecca Ann “Becky” Dowski (21), a business management major working as a stockbroker. The lesbian couple disappeared after leaving a computer lab on the William & Mary campus at around 6:30 p.m. on October 9, 1986. Thomas had ventured onto the Colonial Parkway in the past to be alone with romantic partners.

On October 12, between 5:30 and 5:45 a.m., a jogger discovered a white 1980 Honda Civic at the bottom of an embankment at the Cheatham Annex Overlook, seven miles east of Williamsburg. The Civic had veered off the road and into thick, dense shrubbery only a few feet from a fifteen-foot drop into the York River. A Virginia State Police patrolman called to the scene discovered Thomas and Dowski's bodies inside the vehicle. Dowski's body was found in the backseat, while Thomas was found stuffed into the hatchback.

An autopsy found rope burns on both women's necks and wrists, as well as signs of strangulation. Their throats had been slashed so deeply that they were nearly decapitated. Thomas apparently struggled with her attacker, as a clump of hair was later found between her fingers. Both women were fully clothed and there was no evidence of sexual assault. Authorities ruled out robbery as a motive, since both women's purses were in the vehicle, and no money or jewelry had been taken. The killer had covered the bodies and vehicle with diesel fuel but had not lit them on fire. Over 100 latent and full fingerprints were found on the interior and exterior of the Civic, but they matched no one in police records.

At that time police believed that the murders happened elsewhere, as little blood was found in the car itself. In November 1986, just weeks after the murder, news outlets reported that FBI profilers were constructing a profile of the person or persons responsible for the murders. In 2024, Bill Thomas recalled that four days after his sister Cathy's death, the FBI suggested to him that the perpetrator may have been a member of law enforcement.

On January 20, 2026, authorities announced that DNA evidence had conclusively linked Alan Wilmer to the murders of Dowski and Thomas.

=== David Knobling and Robin Edwards ===
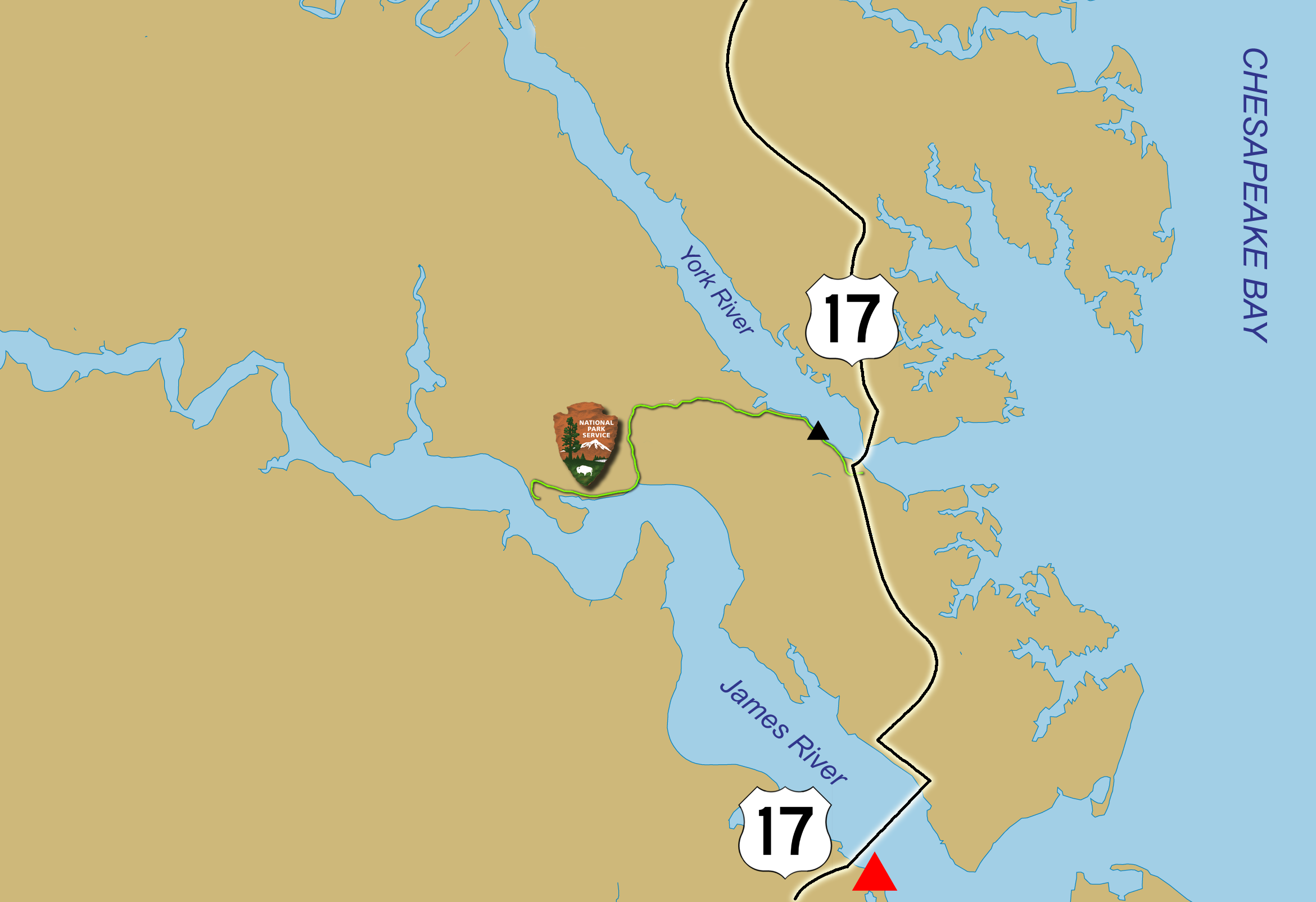
Site of the Knobling-Edwards murders on Ragged Island, near Route 17

In 1987, salesman David Lee Knobling (20) and eighth-grade student Robin Margaret Edwards (14) were murdered. Edwards and Knobling disappeared on September 19, after Knobling agreed to drive his younger cousin and Edwards on a date to a screening of the film Dragnet (1987). Knobling left his home around midnight, while Edwards left hers a half-hour later.

Knobling's truck, a black Ford Ranger, was discovered on September 21 by a patrolman at the Ragged Island Wildlife Refuge's parking area, with the wipers and radio on and the engine running. Both doors were open, and the driver's side window was partially rolled down, causing police to speculate that the perpetrator either was or had been posing as a uniformed officer. Knobling's wallet was found inside the truck, which ruled robbery out as motive. Articles of clothing were also found in the vehicle. A group of teenagers partying on Ragged Island until 2:00 a.m. on September 19 had reported no sighting of the pickup.

On September 23, the bodies of Knobling and Edwards were found after being washed ashore with the tide about 100 feet apart on the bank of the James River. Both victims had been shot: Edwards in the back of the head execution-style; and Knobling twice, once in the head and once in the shoulder. Both were partially clothed; Edwards was found with her jeans unfastened and her bra around her neck. Investigators were unsure if a sexual assault had taken place since, despite Edwards being underage, it was presumed that she and Knobling had a sexual relationship. The state police later said she was assaulted.

Authorities suspected a connection between the double-murder of Knobling and Edwards to that of Dowski and Thomas. Although the former deaths did not occur on the Colonial Parkway, both sets of victims were couples who had been killed at or around lovers' lane areas, and the two locations were only about a thirty-minute drive apart.

On January 8, 2024, authorities announced that DNA evidence had conclusively linked Alan Wilmer to the murders of Knobling and Edwards. Via DNA evidence, Wilmer was also linked to the otherwise unrelated 1989 murder of Teresa Lynn Howell.

=== Brian Pettinger ===
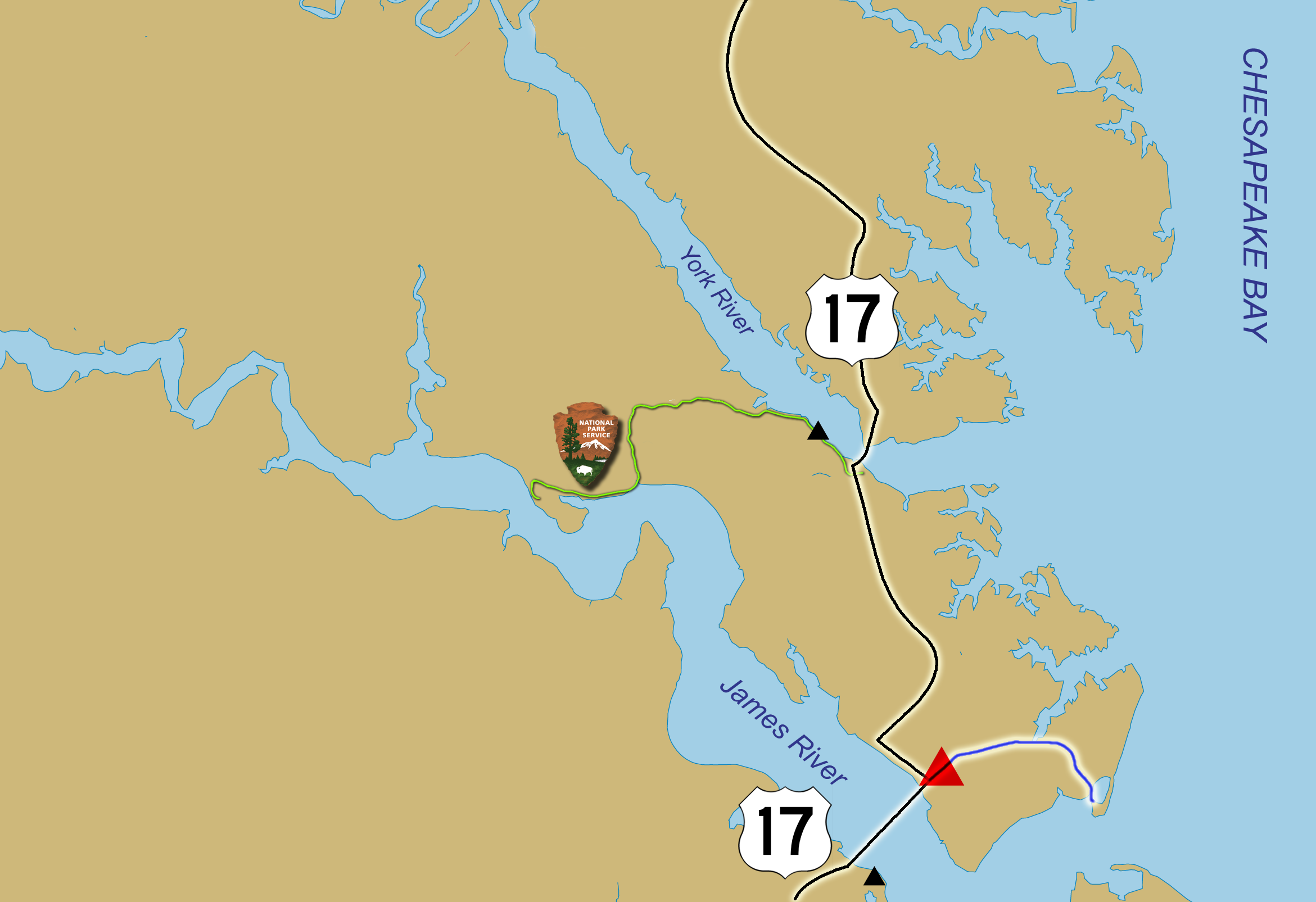
Site of Brian Pettinger disappearance and vehicle recovery on Mercury Boulevard

Brian Craig Pettinger (25), a heavy equipment operator employed as maintenance man for a local apartment complex, was last seen at a Hampton ballroom dance studio on December 4, 1987, at 11:30 p.m. Pettinger was training to become a ballroom dance instructor. Two days after reporting him missing, Pettinger's wife discovered his vehicle in the parking lot of the Newmarket North Mall.

Two months later, on February 3, 1988, fishermen found Pettinger's body floating in a marshy area of the James River in Suffolk, near the mouth of Chuckatuck Creek. His wrists and ankles were tied, and a rope was bound around his neck. The lead investigator in the case believed that Pettinger had likely been hog-tied. The autopsy showed that Pettinger had suffered blunt force trauma to the back of his head. He was found to have been thrown alive into the river, and drowned, unable to swim. The murder remains unsolved.

Pettinger worked as a security guard and loss prevention officer for the same security services company as Edwards' mother at the time of her murder. Suspect Wayne Elliot Mack, a fellow dance instructor, later acknowledged having left the studio with Pettinger; Mack died by suicide a few months later.

=== Laurie Ann Powell ===
Laurie Ann Powell Compton (18), a graduate of Gloucester High School in Gloucester County, disappeared on March 8, 1988, after an argument with her boyfriend, Chris Cutler (1967–2016). According to Cutler, Powell exited his vehicle during the argument and was last seen at approximately 11:30 p.m. walking along State Route 614 toward the U.S. Route 17 interchange in White Marsh. Cutler was originally considered a suspect in Powell's death.

On April 2, 1988, Powell's body was recovered from the James River near Ragged Island. She was found nude and had sustained multiple stab wounds to her back. Powell had previously worked as a receptionist at the same security company that employed both Pettinger and the mother of Edwards.

On November 14, 2025, authorities publicly confirmed that Alan Wilmer was responsible for Powell's murder.

=== Cassandra Hailey and Keith Call ===
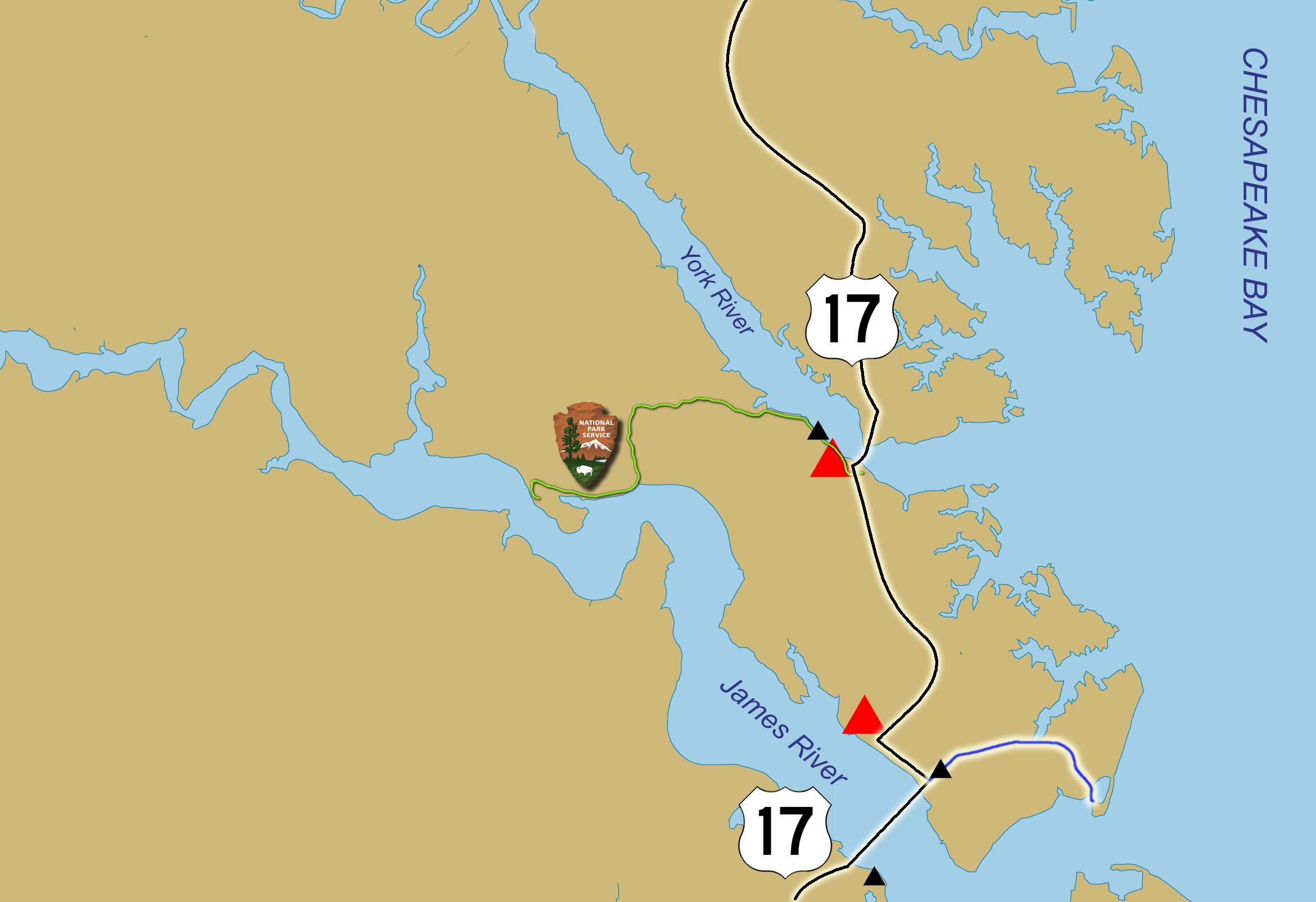
Site of the Hailey-Call disappearance and vehicle recovery on the Colonial Parkway near Route 17

On April 10, 1988, Christopher Newport College students Cassandra Lee Hailey (18) and Richard Keith Call (20) were reported missing. Call, who was on a two-week break from his regular girlfriend, asked out Hailey, a classmate, to see a movie on Saturday night and then attend a party. Call picked up Hailey at her family's residence in Grafton in his red 1982 Toyota Celica. The pair attended a party in the University Square area, where they were seen socializing separately. They were last seen leaving the party sometime between 11:30 p.m. and 2:25 a.m.

Call's unoccupied vehicle was found at the York River Overlook in Yorktown on the day of their disappearance. The keys were on the driver's seat, and a watch and eyeglasses were left on the dashboard. Nearly all of Call's clothing, including his underwear, was found in the backseat, as were some of Hailey's clothes along with several empty beer cans. Hailey's purse and Call's wallet, however, were missing. Police dogs tracked the two students’ scent along the Parkway, past the site of the Dowski – Thomas vehicle recovery, to the Indian Field Creek shoreline. Park authorities initially suggested the couple had gone swimming and drowned, a claim that was met with some skepticism given the forty-degree water temperature in early April and the steep twenty-foot embankment, but the river and surrounding area was thoroughly searched. To this day their bodies have never been found.

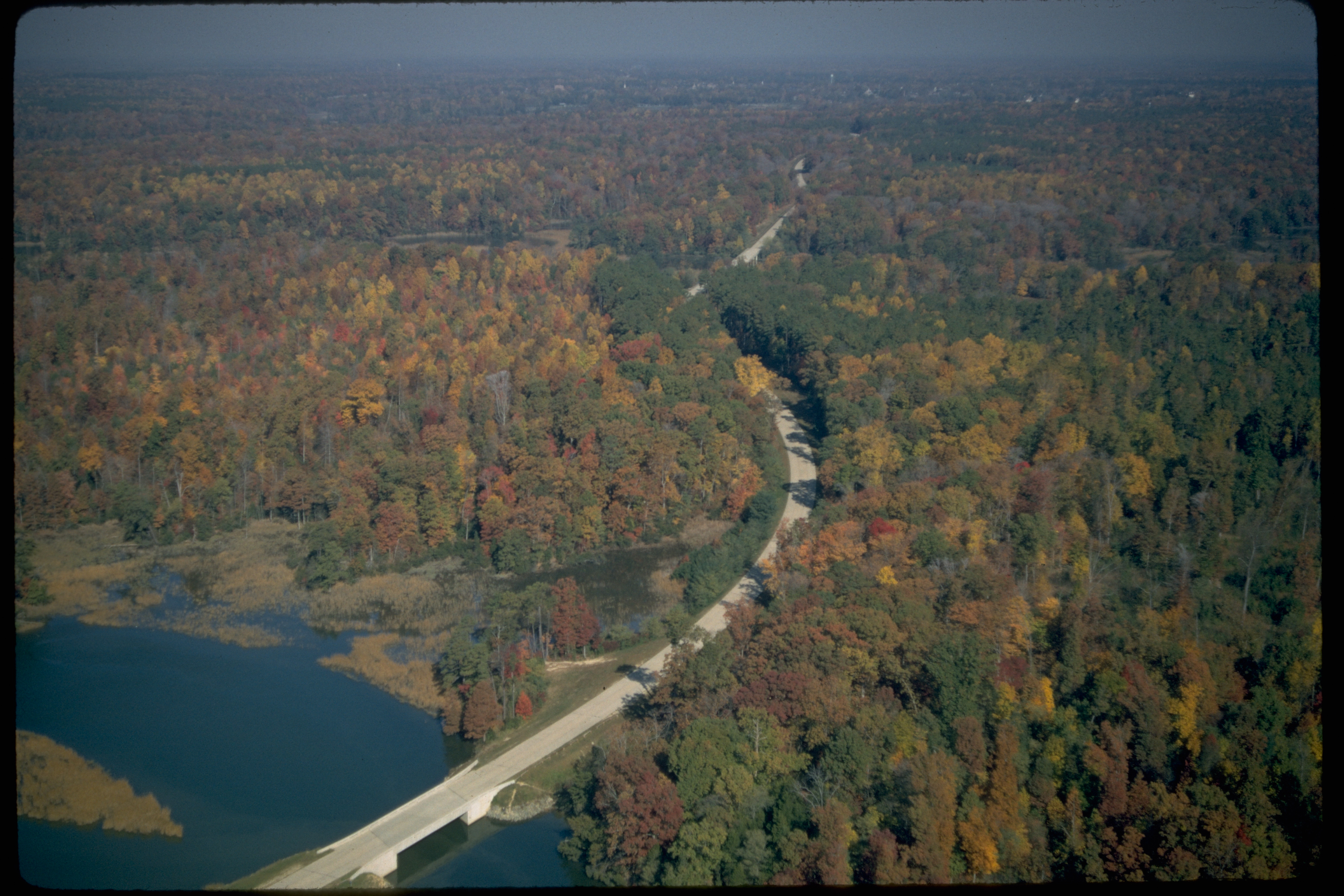
The Colonial Parkway

In the days after the Call – Hailey disappearance, the FBI became aware of a local fisherman driving a blue 1966 Dodge Fargo pickup who had approached at least one other couple on the Parkway at around the same time. The suspect, later identified as Wilmer, was placed under surveillance, and police observed him cleaning and spraypainting his pickup. The FBI executed a search warrant of Wilmer's home, finding handcuffs and a gun. However, an FBI polygraph examiner cleared Wilmer, who was subsequently freed.

In May 1988, the FBI offered a $10,000 reward in the Call – Hailey disappearance. By June, the moniker "Colonial Parkway Murders" was being applied to the killings.

On September 18, 2026, the FBI announced that they had enough evidence to link Wilmer to the case, officially closing it.

=== Teresa Howell ===
On July 1, 1989, Teresa Lynn Howell (29) was seen leaving the Zodiac Club, a popular Hampton nightspot, at around 2:30 a.m. Seven hours later, her body was found by a construction worker in a nearby wooded area. Howell had been sexually assaulted and strangled. The murder was not connected to the Colonial Parkway killings until 2022, when DNA from the case was linked to the Knobling – Edwards killing. The DNA was identified as belonging to Wilmer on January 8, 2024.

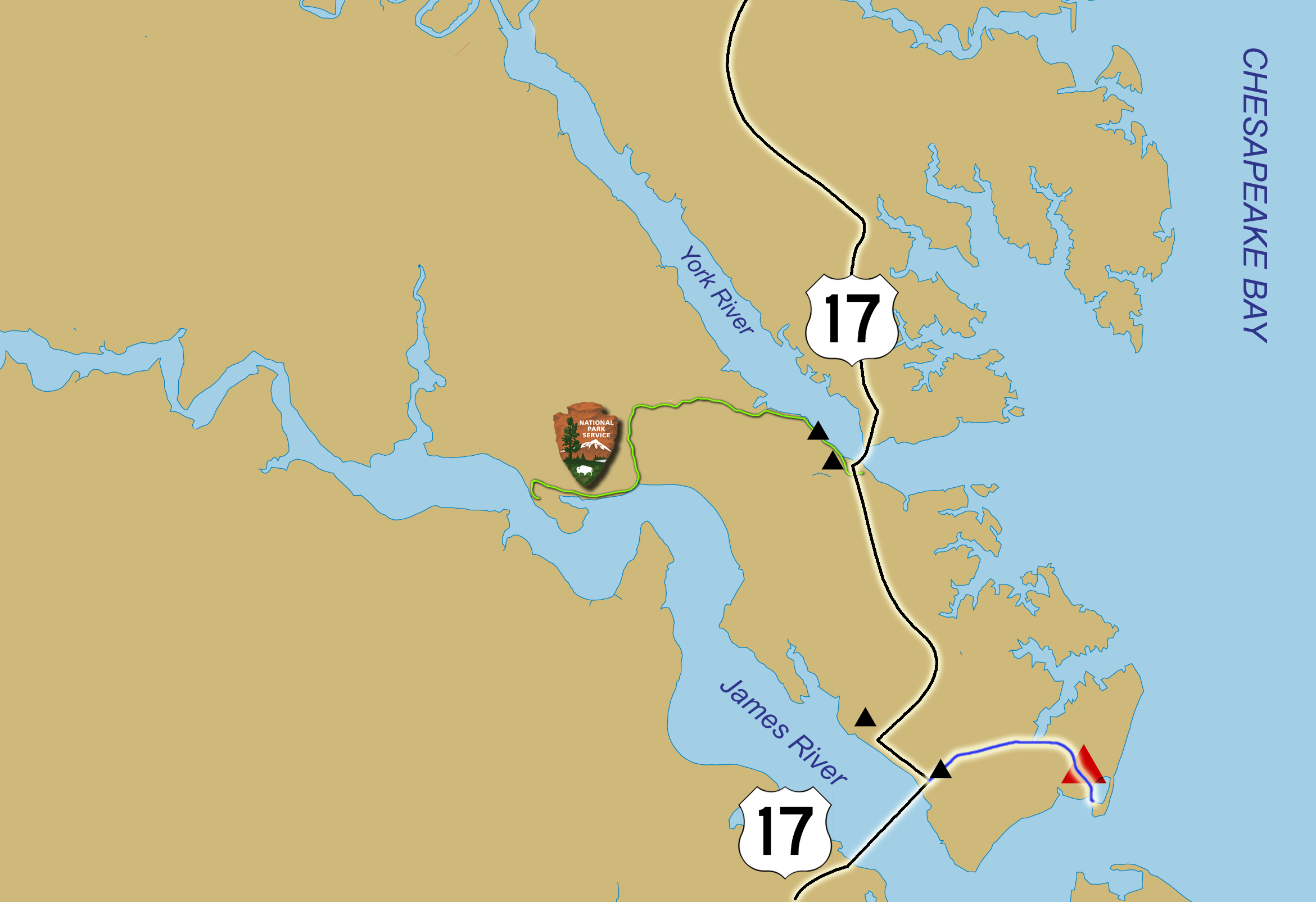
Teresa Howell was last seen at the Zodiac Club on Mercury Boulevard

=== Annamaria Phelps and Daniel Lauer ===
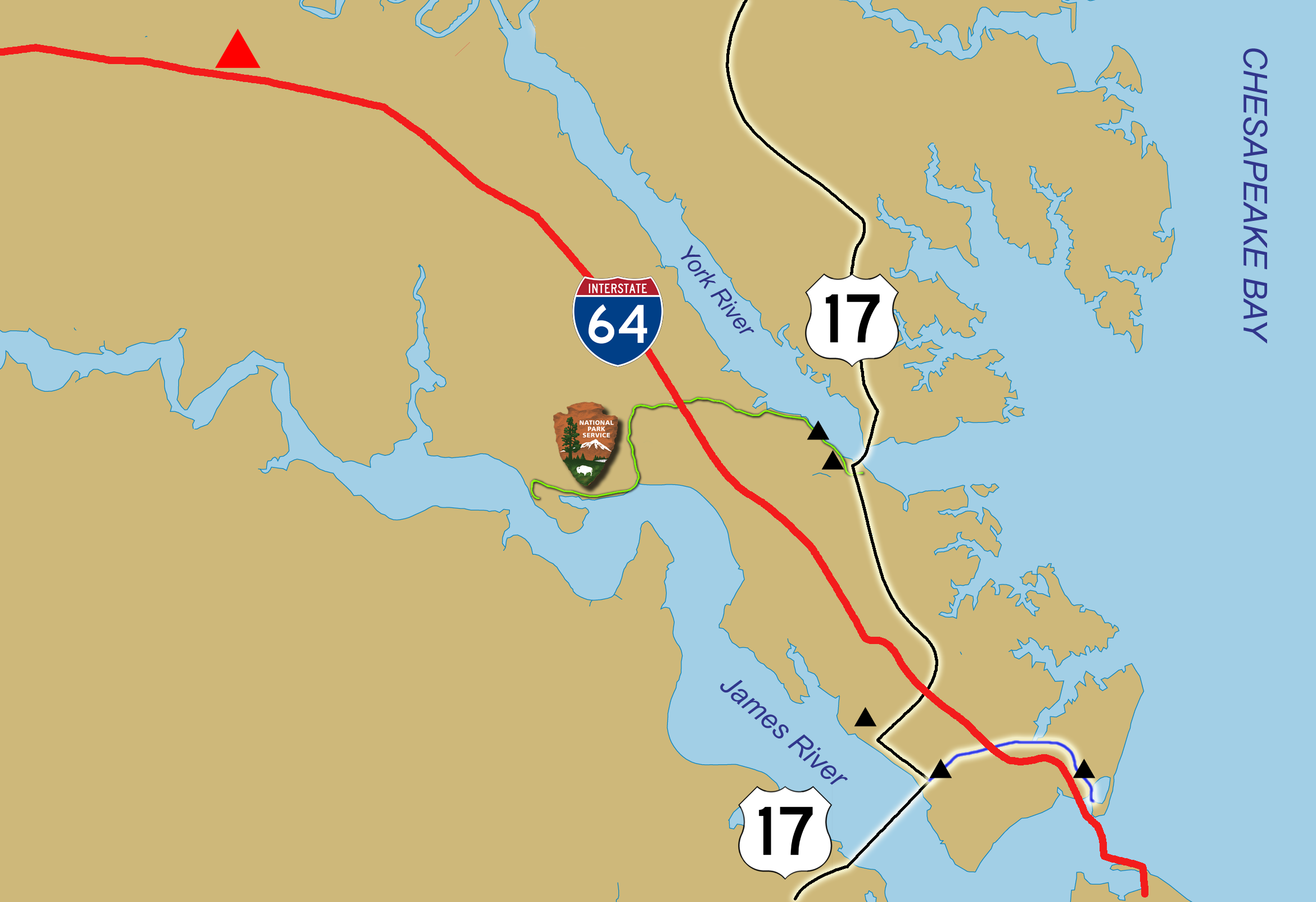
Site of the Phelps-Lauer murder and vehicle recovery on Interstate 64

On September 5, 1989, Annamaria Phelps (18) and her boyfriend's brother, Daniel Lauer (21), vanished en route to Virginia Beach. Lauer's vehicle, a gold 1972 Chevrolet Nova, was later found abandoned at the westbound Interstate 64 rest stop in New Kent County. It is unclear whether Phelps and Lauer were killed at the rest stop or elsewhere. Both the driver and passenger side doors were unlocked, and the keys still in the ignition. Police found dirt and grass stains on the vehicle's underside, suggesting the car had recently been driven through the woods. Phelps' purse was found inside the car, so robbery was again ruled out as a motive.

On October 19, the skeletonized bodies of Phelps and Lauer were discovered in a wooded area by hunters along Interstate 64 between Williamsburg and Richmond. They were covered in an electric blanket from Lauer's car. The bodies were badly decomposed, making it impossible to determine either the cause of death or whether there had been a sexual assault. They were found near a logging road about a mile away from the rest stop where Lauer's car was found.

In 2010, a note was discovered in a box recovered years earlier from Phelps' apartment. The note, which was undated and purportedly written by Phelps, indicated that she was to meet someone in a blue van at a rest stop. The note named an individual and provided a phone number.

== Possible additional victims ==
=== Mike Margaret and Donna Hall ===
On August 21, 1984, the bodies of Michael Sturgis “Mike” Margaret (21) and Donna Lynn Hall (18) were found in a wooded area approximately 300 yards southwest of the Kings Crossing apartment complex in Henrico. The couple had been last seen on August 17, when they had told their respective families they planned to go on a camping trip together.

Three days later, a retired dentist walking his dog discovered Margaret's Jeep backed into a depression off the trail with the passenger door open, keys in the ignition and ashtray open. One red bandana was hanging from the rear-view mirror, and another loosely tied around the clutch. The canvas top of the jeep had been rolled up and pinned back, even though it had rained over the weekend. Inside the back end were two suitcases and a paper bag filled with clothes. A trail of blood led to the bodies of Hall and Margaret underneath a checkered red and blue blanket about twenty feet away.

Both victims had been stabbed and their throats slit. The state coroner stated they died at 2:00 a.m. on August 18, only hours after they were last seen. Both had the sedative Demerol in their systems. Hall's body was found without shoes or defensive wounds but was clutching pine needles, leading investigators to believe that she and Margaret were actually killed where their bodies were found. Margaret also had defensive wounds and a comparatively lower dosage of Demerol in his system. Some detectives believe that Hall and Margaret were the first victims of Alan Wilmer due to similarities in modus operandi.

=== Mary Harding ===
In 2024, after Wilmer was officially identified as a suspect, it was revealed that his older brother Keith had been a suspect in the 1985 murder of Mary Keyser Harding (24), whose body was found floating in the Rappahannock River. Keith's wife, Brenda Pittman Wilmer, worked at the same bank as Harding. Keith had been banned from the bank's premises after he had sexually harassed customers and employees, including Mary. Alan Wilmer's house and boat were searched by law enforcement at the time, but no evidence tying him to the crime was found. Alan also took a polygraph, but the results were inconclusive.

Another local fisherman, Emerson Stevens, was ultimately convicted and imprisoned for Harding's murder. Stevens was later found to have been wrongfully convicted and was released from prison after 32 years. He received a full pardon from Virginia Governor Ralph Northam in 2021. Keith Wilmer died on April 30, 2025, at age 73.

=== Shenandoah National Park killings ===
On June 1, 1996, the bodies of Julianne Marie Williams (24) and Laura "Lollie" Salisbury Winans (26) were found by park rangers at the Shenandoah National Park after Lollie's Golden Retriever was found wandering near the Whiteoak Canyon Trail. The two women, who were in a relationship, had gone on a camping trip in the park on May 19. Williams and Winans were last seen alive in the park on May 24. Their bodies were found at a remote campsite about a quarter mile from Skyline Drive. Winans' body was found inside a tent. Williams' body was found in a sleeping bag about forty feet away, down an embankment. Their hands were bound, their mouths were gagged and their throats were slit. Both were partially undressed, but neither were sexually assaulted.

The FBI investigated whether the murders were related to the killings of Dowski and Thomas. In that case, the victims were similarly bound and stabbed and had not been molested. Both double-murders occurred on National Park Service property, which were connected by Interstate 64. Detective Steve Spingola, who was asked to investigate the Colonial Parkway murders as a private investigator, believed that the Dowski – Thomas killings were not related to the other Colonial Parkway murders and were, instead, connected to the Williams – Winans killings.

In 2001, the U.S. Department of Justice indicted Darrell David Rice for the Williams – Winans murders, but charges were dropped after DNA found at the scene matched neither Rice nor the victims. In 2024, 15 days after his exoneration, Rice was killed in a car accident. In June 2024, the FBI announced DNA evidence linked the killing to serial rapist Walter "Leo" Jackson. Jackson had died in 2018 while incarcerated for other crimes.

== Theories ==
=== Law enforcement ===
At the first crime scene, Thomas' wallet had been removed from her purse, as if she was preparing to show her identification. Just days after the first murder, the FBI privately suggested to family that the perpetrator might be a member of law enforcement or other authority figure.

=== Fisherman ===
At the Dowski – Thomas crime scene, a piece of nautical line had been found in Thomas' hair. The killer attempted to use diesel fuel to set fire to the victims' vehicle, suggesting the perpetrators purchased fuel at a gas station for use in a boat rather than purchasing it directly from a marina, a practice common to local fishermen. The sharpness of the knife, which nearly decapitated Thomas, also suggested a fisherman. Knobling and Edwards were found on the banks of the James River. In the Hailey – Call case, police dogs traced a scent from the car to the nearby edge of the York River, suggesting the involvement of a boat.

=== Vehicle staging ===
Thomas' vehicle was found with the driver's seat adjusted for someone taller than her, suggesting the killer may had driven it before it was pushed off the embankment. A search of the area failed to find any pools of blood; the murders had happened elsewhere, potentially not on the Parkway.

Knobling's truck was found with doors open, keys in the ignition and the radio playing. Knobling, an automotive enthusiast, never left his truck unlocked. He consistently parked by backing in, yet the truck was found parked by driving forward. Knobling had wired his car's radio directly to the battery so that the ignition did not need to be set to Accessories, as it was when the truck was discovered. This suggested someone other than Knobling had been the last to operate the vehicle.

When Call's vehicle was found on the Parkway, families quickly disputed that the victims would have intentionally parked there. Both Hailey and Call's families reported their loved ones had a fear of the dark, isolated Parkway at nighttime. Call's keys were in the ignition and his gold wristwatch was left in the seat, something family insisted he would never do. Lauer's vehicle was found near a westbound interstate rest stop, but Lauer and Phelps were known to be traveling eastward to Virginia Beach. A feathered roach clip, which Lauer kept attached to the rear-view mirror, had been transferred to the driver's side mirror.

=== Multiple offenders working together ===
Larry McCann, head of the Virginia State Police's Behavioral Science Unit, argued that two individuals were working together in the murders. He felt the level of control demonstrated over victims suggested two perpetrators. Irvin Wells, of the FBI, also suspected a pair of offenders. In a 2025 episode of the Mind Over Murder podcast, Cathy Thomas' brother Bill stated, "I'm fairly certain that [Wilmer] did not act alone."

=== Liberty Security Services ===
On April 19, 1988, press reports alleged that local private investigator Ronald Little, then under arrest on immigration charges, was a suspect in the murders. Robin Edwards's mother Bonnie had been employed by Little's company, Liberty Security Services, while Brian Pettinger had worked for the firm as a security guard and loss prevention officer. Laurie Ann Powell Compton, who had gone missing on March 8, 1988, was also an employee of the company. The FBI denied that Little was a suspect in the murders. Little was ultimately deported back to his native New Zealand in 1989 and has since died.

In 2025, Bill Thomas opined: "[T]here just seems to be this recurring nexus around this small security company based in Gloucester, just a couple of miles away from where Lori Ann Powell was last seen."

== Suspect identified ==
The prime suspect in the murders, Alan Wade Wilmer Sr., worked as a fisherman on his own boat, the Denni Wade, primarily harvesting clams and oysters. He later started a tree-cutting company called Better Tree Service, operating in the Cove Colony area. Wilmer was an avid hunter, a member of a local hunting club and won local archery competitions. He was married on February 22, 1975, and had a divorce on December 23, 1982, around a year after separation from his spouse. Wilmer had two children, both adults at the time of his death in 2017.

Wilmer was known to confront couples on the Colonial Parkway. In one instance, he had confronted a girl and her long-haired boyfriend, mistaking the pair for a same-sex couple. Wilmer had reportedly banged on the cars window, asking "Are you girls having fun?". He then laughed upon realizing it was a straight couple, and left the scene. Wilmer also placed himself near the site of the recovered vehicle in the Hailey – Call disappearance. Despite public protest, Wilmer's DNA was not entered into the CODIS, the United States' national DNA database.

== Media coverage ==
In 2007, the case of Hailey and Call was featured in the Investigation Discovery program Sensing Murder. In 2008, E! Entertainment Television presented a full-length documentary, THS Investigates Serial Killers on the Loose, which features a segment on the Colonial Parkway murders.

In September 2009, it was discovered by CBS News affiliate WTKR that nearly eighty highly graphic crime scene photographs of Colonial Parkway victims were used to instruct a class by a retired and since-deceased former FBI photographer.

In 2011, author Michelle McNamara published a two-part exploration of the Colonial Parkway murders in her True Crime Diary.

In October 2016, there was extensive coverage of the 30th anniversary of the Colonial Parkway murders, including an eight-part multimedia presentation by the Daily Press newspaper.

On October 8, 2016, the Richmond Times Dispatch ran an in-depth article on the thirtieth anniversary of the Colonial Parkway murders case: After 30 Years, Relatives in Parkway Murders Hope for a Break in Cases.

On May 4, 2018, the Colonial Parkway murders were covered in featured panel discussion at the annual "CrimeCon" true crime convention in Nashville. Moderated by former FBI Special Agent Maureen O'Connell, the panel featured family members and advocates Joyce Call and Bill Thomas along with Blaine Pardoe, coauthor of a book on the case, A Special Kind of Evil: The Colonial Parkway Serial Killings.

On July 23, 2018, Richmond station WTVR-TV reported that there was additional DNA evidence available for testing in the Colonial Parkway murders.

Investigation Discovery, the Norfolk Virginian Pilot, Access Hollywood, The Daily Beast, Listverse, Daily Press, Dateline NBC and others have published later summaries of the case.

On April 25, 2019, The New York Times published a story on the use of DNA in the Golden State Killer case, the Colonial Parkway murders, and other unsolved homicides titled Sooner or Later, Your Cousin's DNA is Going to Solve a Murder.

On July 30, 2019, The Washington Post ran a story on the search for answers in the Colonial Parkway murders and other cases titled Victims, Families and America's Thirst for True-Crime Stories.

On September 17, 2020, the publication Forensic Genomics published an article by family member Bill Thomas covering the Colonial Parkway murders entitled "The Family Perspective."

On January 15, 2021, the Oxygen Network announced that a four-part true crime series, Lovers Lane Murders would cover the Colonial Parkway murders. The four episodes were to feature former FBI profiler Jim Clemente, as well as investigators including former FBI Agent Maureen O'Connell and former prosecutor Loni Coombs, together with crime scene reconstruction expert Dr. Laura Pettler. The series made its debut on February 11–12, 2021.

On February 4, 2021, in advance of their Lover's Lane Murders television series, the Oxygen Network released a series of videos including "Why Would Law Enforcement Not Release All Records On a Case Like the Colonial Parkway Murders?" and "Was the Colonial Parkway Killer Pretending to be Law Enforcement?"

On April 2, 2025, Episode 1, Season 5 of Homicide Hunter: American Detective, hosted by Joe Kenda, covered the murders.

On October 28, 2026, the YouTube channel The Infographic Show published a video detailing the timeline and discovery of the case and of the suspect Wilmer.

== Timeline ==
- Oct. 9, 1986 – Rebecca Dowski and Cathy Thomas last seen leaving University computer lab together
- Oct. 12, 1986 – Rebecca Dowski and Cathy Thomas found murdered on Colonial Parkway
- Sept. 19, 1987 – David Knobling and Robin Edwards last seen at respective family homes
- Sept. 23, 1987 – David Knobling and Robin Edwards found murdered on Ragged Island
- Dec. 4, 1987 – Brian Craig Pettinger disappears after training at Ballroom Dance Club, a studio on Mercury Blvd; Vehicle found in nearby mall parking lot
- March 8, 1988 - Powell last seen at approximately 11:30 p.m. walking along Route 614 toward Route 17 in the White Marsh area of Gloucester County. Body was recovered from the James River near Ragged Island on April 2.
- Apr. 10, 1988 – Cassandra Hailey and Keith Call reported missed after university party; car recovered on Colonial Parkway, which Call was leery of visiting
- Jul. 1, 1989 – Teresa Lynn Howell found murdered hours after leaving Zodiac Club on Mercury Blvd
- Sept. 5, 1989 – Annamaria Phelps and Daniel Lauer missing; car recovered at New Kent rest stop on I-64 Westbound, opposite to their direction of travel
- Oct. 21, 1989 – Phelps and Lauer bodies found at hunt club property near New Kent rest stop

Name(s)	Last seen	Vehicle recovered	Vehicle Staging	Bodies recovered	Cause of death	Wilmer link?
Rebecca Dowski; Cathy Thomas	9 Oct 86, campus computer lab	12 Oct, off Parkway embankment	Driver's seat adjusted for a taller driver	12 Oct inside vehicle	Near-decapitation from sharp blade	Alan Wade Wilmer DNA
David Knobling; Robin Edwards	19 Sep 87, respective family homes	21 Sep, Ragged Island lot	Keys in ignition at accessory position with radio on, not backed in, doors open, window down	23 Sep, beach of Ragged Island near truck	Gunshot	Alan Wade Wilmer DNA
Brian Pettinger	2 Dec 87, ballroom dance studio	4 Dec, Newmarket North mall parking lot	Door handle almost broken off	1 Feb 88, James river marsh in Suffolk	Blunt force trauma to head, drowning	
Laurie Ann Powell Compton	8 Mar 1988, walking along Route 614 toward Route 17	—N/a		2 Apr 1988, James River near Ragged Island	Multiple stabs wounds to back	Alan Wade Wilmer DNA
Cassandra Hailey; Keith Call	10 Apr 88, University Square party	10 Apr 88, Colonial Parkway	Keys in ignition, gold wristwatch on seat	Bodies never recovered	Unknown	Alan Wade Wilmer confirmed by FBI, no DNA link (bodies never recovered)
Teresa Howell	1 Jul 89, Zodiac Club	—N/a		1 Jul, construction site	Strangulation	Alan Wade Wilmer DNA
Annamaria Phelps; Daniel Lauer	5 Sep 89, enroute eastbound to Virginia Beach	5 Sep 89, Westbound I-64 New Kent rest stop	Roach clip moved, keys in ignition	21 Oct, hunt club near rest area	Uncertain, but Phelps showed evidence of stabbing	

== See also ==
- Murder Accountability Project
