= Jeffrey Shuman =

American-French bank robber

- Born: July 1962 (age 63–64); Los Angeles, California, U.S.
- Other names: "The Vaulter", "Reebok Bandit"
- Citizenship: United States; France
- Occupation: Bank robber
- Spouse: Claudia (div.)
- Convictions: Bank robbery (1994); Drug trafficking (2007); Bank robbery (2017)
- Penalty: 12 years' imprisonment (1994); 30 months' imprisonment (2007); 15 years' imprisonment and ordered to pay nearly $450,000 in restitution (2017)

Jeffrey Shuman (born July 1962) is an American-French bank robber, dubbed the "Reebok Bandit" and "The Vaulter", is considered to be one the most prolific bank robbers in the United States and Canada. In 1994, he pleaded guilty to robbing 14 banks in the United States, receiving a 12-year sentence, but was released in 2004, and fled the country while on parole. He then robbed 21 banks in Canada, before fleeing to France on his French passport. In 2016, he was extradited to Canada, and in 2017, was sentenced to 15 years in prison and ordered to pay back nearly $450,000 in restitution after pleading guilty to seven counts of robbery using a firearm.

== Early life ==
Shuman was born in Los Angeles County, California, U.S. in July 1962. He is a dual citizen of the United States and France, acquired through his maternal grandmother who immigrated to the United States from Southern France in 1946 as a war bride. His mother Danielle would arrive to the United States with her mother as an infant. His father James was an American. When Danielle became pregnant in high school, she and James married, but shortly thereafter divorced. James soon after had his own issues with criminality, charged with burglary, forgery and possession with intent to sell.

After high school, Shuman served in the US Navy and studied fashion merchandising before working in the mortgage business and land development between 1985 and 1987. In 1988, he unsuccessfully ran for US Congress as a libertarian, later moving to the Bahamas and England, before moving back to the United States, to Miami in 1992.

== United States ==
Between 1992 and 1993, Shuman robbed over a dozen banks in Florida and Tennessee jumping over the counters and raiding the cash drawers. He was dubbed the "Reebok Bandit" by FBI agents because he wore tennis shoes during his heists.

=== Arrest, incarceration and release ===
In 1993, while driving in Alabama, he was stopped for speeding; officers searched the trunk of his rental car and found a trash bag with a police radio scanner, an air pistol, plastic gloves, maps of Florida, Alabama, Georgia and Tennessee and baseball caps under the spare tire. He only received a traffic citation, but within days, a warrant was issued for bank robbery, and the FBI arrested him on July 24, 1993, as he returned his rental car in Miami. In April 1994, he pleaded guilty to robbing 14 banks, receiving a 12-year sentence. He married a woman named Claudia, but divorced five years later.

In 2004, Shuman was released on parole. He fled to France while on parole. In 2006, he was arrested in French Guiana in possession of 1.5 kilograms of cocaine, but managed to avoid jail time, and one year after that, was convicted of drug trafficking, for which he spent 30 months in a French jail.

== Canada ==
On January 29, 2010, Shuman arrived in Toronto. Shuman began robbing banks in Canada, 12 in York Region, Ontario (Markham, Richmond Hill and Vaughan), four in Calgary, Alberta, two in the Region of Peel, Ontario, and one in each of Hamilton, Ottawa and Toronto between 2010 and 2015 – a total of 21 robberies in Canada.

For his initial Canadian heists, he hopped over the teller counter and then drew his weapon, similar to how he operated in the United States. Shuman became more violent as the robberies progressed, waiting for employees to open the banks in the morning and holding them at gun point locking them in the vault. He managed to steal a total of about $450,000 from the robberies, most of which were successful, between 2010 and 2015.

Detectives from Toronto Police, Peel Regional Police, and York Regional Police formed a "Hold Up" taskforce to catch Shuman. The Canadian Bankers Association also advertised a $100,000 reward for a positive identification that led to Shuman's arrest. However Canadian authorities could not identify him from running through all clues through Canadian fingerprint and DNA databases, but a member of the task force then contacted the United States Department of Homeland Security who immediately confirmed that their suspect was Shuman who had been convicted of robbery in the United States.

=== Extradition and sentence ===
After Shuman's last robbery in Mississauga, Ontario, on May 8, 2015, he fled to France using his French passport. York Regional Police issued an international arrest warrant, and four months later, on September 15, 2015, with the help of French, German, Swiss and Danish authorities who monitored his activities in Europe, tracked him down to Geneva, Switzerland, where he was arrested on his way from France. Shuman fought the extradition order for two months but a Swiss court upheld the legality of the order.

Accompanied by four Canadian municipal police officers, Shuman was placed aboard an Air Canada flight for extradition to Canada on February 23, 2016, however, Shuman faked chest pains over French airspace in an attempt to get the flight to land in France since the country does not extradite their citizens. Upon advice from the Canadian officers, the plane diverted to Heathrow Airport in London, where he was technically not granted entry to the United Kingdom but instead placed in "immigration hold", which preventing him from arguing that the extradition order was invalid (it only applied to Geneva) and that he should be repatriated to France. Under armed police escort, Shuman was taken to a London hospital and the checkup showed no evidence of heart problems. Shuman caused a disturbance and was banned from the passenger flight. As Shuman's lawyer was attempting to file claims of being wrongly convicted, the Attorney General of Ontario charted a private jet, costing nearly $100,000 to transport him to Toronto.

Shuman faced 31 criminal charges, including 11 counts of armed robbery. On July 25, 2017, Shuman was sentenced to 15 years in prison and ordered to pay back nearly $450,000 in restitution, in a Newmarket courthouse, after pleading guilty to seven counts of robbery using a firearm.

Shuman has been held at Collins Bay Institution in Kingston, Ontario. His two requests for parole, in 2022 and 2024, were denied. He is set to be released in September 2025, and immediately deported to France.
