= Lynn Raulerson =

American plant biologist (1937–2012)

- Born: 1937; Arcadia, Florida, U.S.
- Died: August 21, 2012 (aged 74–75)
- Education: Emory University; University of Georgia (PhD)
- Occupation: Botanist
- Scientific career
- Fields: Botany

Claire Lynn Raulerson (1937 - 21 August 2012) was an American plant biologist who worked in Guam and specialised in the study of Micronesian plants, especially those of Guam and the other Mariana Islands. She held her position in biology at the University of Guam for over forty years.

== Biography ==
Raulerson was born in Arcadia, Florida and grew up in and around the Lake Okeechobee area. She attended Stephens College and Emory University in Georgia, then taught at present-day Samford University, Alabama.

In 1970, Raulerson completed a Ph.D. in biology and ecology from the University of Georgia. In 1971, Raulerson was appointed to the position of professor at the University of Guam. From 1981, she was curator of the University of Guam Herbarium. Under her management, the collection grew from 7,000 to 61,000 mounted specimens She was involved with the Guam Science Teachers Association as well as various horticultural and environmental groups.

Towards the end of her life, she created the Raulerson Charitable Trust and endowed it with funds to improve animal welfare on Guam.

== Publications ==
- Raulerson, L. (1979). Terrestrial and freshwater organisms within, and limnology and hydrology of, the Guam Seashore Study Area and the War in the Pacific National Historical Park. Agana: Dept. of Biology, University of Guam.
- Raulerson, L., Aguon, C. F., & University of Guam. (1981). Plant biogeography of Guam. Agana, Guam: University of Guam, Marine Laboratory.
- Raulerson, L., Rinehart, A. F. (1992). Ferns and orchids of the Mariana Islands.
- Raulerson, L., & Rinehart, A. F. (2018). Trees and shrubs of the Northern Mariana Islands.
