= Kevin Pinto =

Kevin John Pinto (1971 in Bahrain) is a Canadian bank robber and former financier, also known as the Exchange Bandit for his habit of engaging bank tellers in conversation about exchange rates.

Beginning in 2002, Pinto robbed 10 banks throughout Ontario; in October 2008, he surrendered to police. He subsequently pleaded guilty, and was sentenced to six years in prison.

Pinto, who had been a vice-president at an investment firm who committed his robberies during his lunch hour, was a compulsive gambler who turned to crime in an attempt to pay his accumulated gambling debts, which far outweighed the total amount he stole.

In 2012, Pinto was granted day parole.
