= 2007 Prague G4S heist =

2007 cash theft in Prague, Czech Republic

- Location: Prague, Czech Republic
- Date: December 1, 2007
- Target: G4S Cash Services
- Attack type: Insider theft

The 2007 Prague G4S heist was a major cash theft carried out on 1 December 2007 at the Prague, Czech Republic premises of G4S Cash Services, a cash transportation and processing company. Approximately 560 million Czech koruna (~$31 million USD) was stolen from the company's vaults, making it the largest known cash theft in Czech history. Police identified G4S employee František Procházka as the principal suspect. He disappeared shortly after the theft and has never been apprehended despite an international manhunt. The heist became widely known in the Czech media as the "theft of the century" (krádež století) because of the unprecedented amount of cash stolen.

== Heist ==
G4S Cash Services, a local branch of the Dutch-based company Group 4 Securitas, operated a cash processing facility in Prague that collected and counted cash deposits from retailers before transferring the funds to banks. Because the theft occurred over a weekend, an unusually large quantity of cash was stored in the company's vaults.

Procházka at the time of the theft was 33 years old and worked for G4S as a security guard. According to Czech police, he exploited his position as an employee to gain access to the secured vault area. Investigators alleged that he removed approximately CZK 560 million in cash, loaded the money into four metal cases, and transferred them to a van driven by an accomplice waiting within the company grounds. After the money had been driven away, Procházka reportedly returned to his workplace and completed his shift in an apparent attempt to avoid suspicion. Within days, Czech police identified Procházka as the primary suspect and launched a nationwide manhunt. Searches of several locations failed to locate him.

== Investigation ==
Police concluded that Procházka had not acted alone, as the volume of stolen banknotes required assistance to transport them from the premises. An unidentified accomplice was believed to have driven the getaway vehicle. In March 2008, Czech police announced the arrest of an accomplice, later revealed to be Milan Čermák. Investigators later obtained surveillance footage showing a man believed to be Procházka at Frankfurt Airport on the day of the theft, suggesting he may have fled abroad.

Following the theft, G4S Cash Services offered a reward of €2 million for information leading to Procházka's arrest and the recovery of the stolen money. An Interpol notice stated that investigators believed Procházka may have travelled to Mexico or the United States and that he had known connections in Florida. The notice also stated that he was known to alter his appearance while evading capture.

In January 2012, Procházka (in absentia) and Čermák were sentenced to 9 years in prison. Čermák was ultimately released in 2016. Later in 2012, Procházka was almost apprehended by Czech police in the Dominican Republic, where a group of other Czech criminals was also hiding. He managed to evade capture due to Hurricane Sandy complicating the operation. As of 2026, Procházka remains a fugitive.

== See also ==
- October 1997 Loomis Fargo robbery, a bank robbery perpetrated by an employee
