= Piggy Bank Bandit =

Unidentified serial bank robber

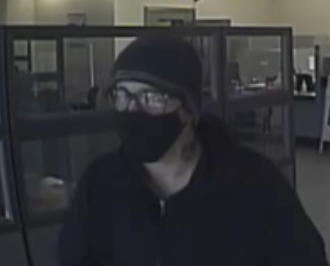
The Piggy Bank Bandit during a bank robbery on December 1, 2020

The Piggy Bank Bandit is a serial bank robber, who is responsible for at least 6 bank robberies in the Phoenix, Arizona area. The FBI believes the Piggy Bank Bandit is responsible for four bank robberies in December 2020 and two robberies in February 2021. The moniker 'Piggy Bank Bandit' was given by the FBI because, in one robbery, the perpetrator took rolls of coins.

== Robberies ==
In total, 6 banks have been robbed across 4 jurisdictions.

The FBI believes that the first bank robbery the “Piggy Bank Bandit” did was on a US Bank in Tempe, Arizona on December 1, 2020. The robber got away with a bag full of rolled coins, which is why the FBI nicknamed them the “Piggy Bank Bandit”. That robbery was followed by a robbery on December 17, 2020, at a Desert Financial Credit Union in Mesa, Arizona. The third robbery was on December 18, 2020, at an Arizona Federal Credit Union in Phoenix, Arizona. The fourth robbery was on February 22, 2021, at a US Bank in Gilbert, Arizona. The fifth and sixth robbery took place on February 26, 2021. Both robberies took place at US Banks in Phoenix, Arizona.

During each of the robberies, the “Piggy Bank Bandit” gave a note to the teller and demanded money.

== Investigation ==
Once the “Piggy Bank Bandit” had crossed jurisdictions between the different bank robberies, the FBI was called in to investigate the bank robberies. During one of the robberies, a security camera caught a glimpse of a tattoo on the “Piggy Bank Bandit’s” neck. Using that information, the FBI Violent Crimes Task Force sent statements to the public, asking for any information that would lead to the arrest of the robber. The FBI has not caught the robber yet.

== See also ==
- Crime in Phoenix
- List of fugitives from justice who disappeared
