= Bobby Randell Wilcoxson =

American bank robber

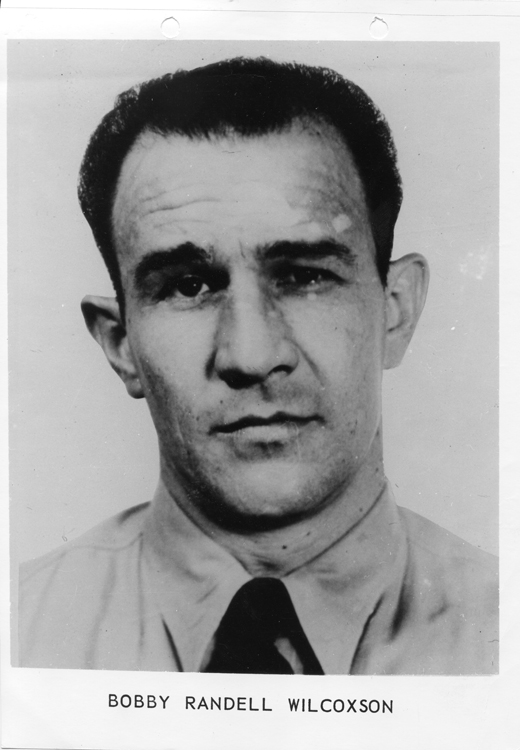

FBI Ten Most Wanted Fugitive
- Charges: Bank robbery Murder

Description
- Born: July 10, 1929; Duke, Oklahoma
- Died: December 9, 2006 (aged 77); Tennessee

Status
- Added: February 23, 1962
- Caught: November 10, 1962
- Number: 167
- Captured

Bobby Randell Wilcoxson (July 10, 1929 – December 9, 2006) was an American bank robber and murderer who appeared on the FBI Ten Most Wanted Fugitives list in 1963.

== Life ==
=== Early life and crimes ===
Wilcoxson was born in July 1929 in Duke, Oklahoma. He was well respected as an efficient crew foreman in the lettuce fields of the Salinas Valley in California, because he spoke Spanish and intimidated laborers. He worked in the produce business in Colorado, New Mexico, and Texas. Wilcoxson also worked as a house painter, service station attendant and a used-car salesman before turning into a professional criminal.

An FBI agent pursuing Wilcoxson once called him "the most wanted man since Dillinger." "One Eye" Bobby Wilcoxson and his crime partner Albert Frederick Nussbaum of Buffalo, New York, were prolific bandits between 1960 and 1962, knocking over at least seven banks in an eighteen-month run. They stole at least $250,000 which by some estimates is roughly the equivalent of $2.8 million in 2008. Peter Columbus Curry of Quitman, Georgia, joined Wilcoxson and Nussbaum on December 15, 1961 - the trio holding up a branch of the Lafayette National Bank in Brooklyn, New York. Wilcoxson entered the bank and pumped four rounds from a Thompson submachine gun into the chest of bank guard Henry Kraus.

=== Arrested ===
In February, 1962, Curry was arrested by the FBI. The FBI listed Wilcoxson on its famous "Most Wanted List" on February 23, 1962, and added Nussbaum on April 3, 1962. In pursuit of the bandits, the FBI circulated over 1 million "wanted" posters and interviewed over 9,000 people in New York state alone. The G-Men declared the robbers dangerous, armed with hand-grenades and 25 submachine guns. "They will not hesitate to open fire," warned the posters. When rumors placed the robbers in Canada and The United Kingdom, the Royal Canadian Mounted Police and the Bobbies of Scotland Yard joined the manhunt. Over 600 FBI agents searched worldwide for Nussbaum, Wilcoxson and Wilcoxson's 19-year-old "paramour," Jacqueline Ruth Rose of Paoli, Indiana and Delray Beach, Florida. Nussbaum was captured by the FBI after a high-speed car chase through Buffalo on November 4, 1962. Mid morning on November 10, 1962, Wilcoxson and Rose came out of their rented home in Baltimore, Maryland, where they encountered a swarm of 30 FBI agents.

== Subsequent criminal history ==
To avoid a death sentence, Wilcoxson pleaded guilty to eight bank robberies and the murder of Kraus. He was sentenced to life in prison in April, 1964 with eligibility for parole in 1979. Wilcoxson went to the United States Penitentiary in Atlanta, Georgia on March 3, 1964. On July 11, 1980, he was transferred to the United States Penitentiary in Leavenworth, Kansas.

Wilcoxson was paroled to Chattanooga, Tennessee in early 1982. His freedom was short lived. On October 23, 1982, Robert Mosher, a chemical engineer of the Dupont Corporation, was murdered. A piece of plastic tarp and 10 inches (25 cm) of a mop handle were shoved down his throat. Wilcoxson was indicted for the homicide on December 19, 1985. He was convicted on November 1, 1986, in the Hamilton County Tennessee Criminal Court of first degree murder for killing Robert Mosher. Mosher's wife, Evelyn, allegedly hired Wilcoxson to murder her husband so she could collect life insurance benefits of $209,000. Evelyn Mosher never paid Wilcoxson. She was convicted for contracting the murder of her husband and received a life sentence. Wilcoxson was sentenced to death by electrocution on February 13, 1987. In 1999, his death sentence was reversed on appeal for ineffective legal representation.

== Death ==
While awaiting an appeal of his conviction, Bobby Randell Wilcoxson died of natural causes on December 9, 2006, at the age of 77 while in the custody of the Tennessee Department of Correction.
