= Kenneth Raulerson =

American bank robber

Kenneth Scott Raulerson (born October 31, 1963), also known as Speedy, is an American bank robber from Levy County, Florida, convicted of robbing the Dowling Park Barnett/Nations Bank on May 18, 1998, by claiming that he had a bomb strapped to his chest. After the robbery, he escaped arrest and fled to Alaska, where he worked on crab boats. After six months, he returned to the backwoods of Florida, where he lived for the following years in an attempt to evade authorities. After a nine-year search by police and detectives he was arrested.

== Police and news reports ==
Prior to the bank robbery, Raulerson and his accomplices had been responsible for previous armed robberies, including the Sun Cruz Robbery where they held a night watchman and stole an ATM. On May 18, 1998, two female bank employees opened the Dowling Park Bank for business and were immediately held up by two men. Two customers also walked in during the course of the robbery and became victims. Thousands of dollars were taken in the robbery where one of the men, believed to be Raulerson, then 34, wore a pinstriped tuxedo type suit and an auburn red wig resembling the one worn by the Joker in the Batman and Robin series. The man alleged to be Raulerson indicated to those in the bank that he had an explosive device strapped to his chest. Both tellers and the customers were forced into the bank's vault and the door was closed before the two men left the bank.

During the get-away, a red dye pack exploded, marking their stolen money, which the investigators used in the investigation to track the robbers. Meanwhile, a bomb threat had also been called in to Suwannee High School at about the same time the robbery took place, causing officers to believe it was a ploy to get officers into Live Oak so the robbery could take place without interference, and the get-away could be accomplished. A car stolen the night before from Easy Auto in Live Oak, and parked overnight at the Suwannee River, was used in the bank heist. A boat and motor stolen from a nearby home several days earlier was believed to be used after the stolen car was ditched in bushes near the river. Three men were arrested, charged and sentenced in the case, but Raulerson eluded capture.

On November 2005, Deputy U.S. Marshals began working on the case with the Florida Department of Law Enforcement and Levy County Sheriff's Office. Sheriff's deputies said Raulerson got the name Speedy for his ability to get away from officers, often slipping into the wooded areas around Gulf Hammock, Inglis and Yankeetown - areas where he had grown up and knew how to survive. Once the marshal's service took over the case in November, they deemed it a major case and made it a top priority. The Levy County Sheriff's Investigators eventually determined that Raulerson had relocated to Interlachen, Florida, where he did yard work for cash. They began working with Putnam County Sheriff's Deputies to lure Raulerson to a place where they could arrest him.

An undercover female officer arranged to meet Raulerson at a previously abandoned home on Thursday, allegedly to get an estimate on cleaning up the property. Raulerson was arrested with the help of a police dog. He served time in jail, until his release on December 2, 2014.

== Portrayals ==
Raulerson's exploits were first aired on the television series America's Most Wanted. His crimes were also featured in an episode of Discovery Channel's I (Almost) Got Away with It, entitled "Got to Work on a Crab Boat", with him and the men who arrested him detailing his escape from the law by hiding in the thick woods and his eventual arrest.

Jeremy Renner portrayed Raulerson in an episode of the series It's Florida, Man, with the episode based around the robber's past exploits. Raulerson himself makes a cameo appearance in the show.
