= Robert Toye =

American bank robber

Robert Vernon Toye, (b 1948?) nicknamed "Blind Bob" is a US bank robber who is legally blind.

== Early life ==
Toye was born in San Pedro, California and developed retinitis pigmentosa in the early age.

== Mail fraud ==
In 1968 he begin a mail scam where people would send him $5 application fee to receive work stuffing envelopes. 1973 he was sentenced for mail fraud and jailed in Springfield, Missouri.

== Bank robberies ==
In prison he heard that bank tellers in federally insured banks were instructed to hand out the money to robbers without incident. So, when Toye was released 1974, he proceeded to make his first bank robbery shortly after he had left the prison. He was armed only with his white cane and a note that claimed he had a gun.

Toye concentrated on using his right eye to see shadowy impressions of other people's feet and followed them to the bank teller's window. There he would flash a one-eyed jack with a text "Be quick, be quiet, or you're dead. Put all the cash in the bag. I have a gun". When he had received the money, he retreated back to the door. He used the same technique many times.

Toye was captured 1977 in New York City when he collided with armed guards that were delivering money to the bank. Next six years he spent in the Metropolitan Correctional Center in New York. When he got out in February 1983, he went to a Citibank and stole $18,000.

Toye moved to Las Vegas but made a list of all the Citibank branches in New York. Nine times he flew to New York to rob a bank and immediately returned to Las Vegas after the robbery. He put the money in a Vegas bank account under a false name. He was arrested May 24, 1983 when he took a detour to a discount store. Toye was sentenced to 17 years and tried to escape 11 times.

In an interview for the People magazine in 1990, Toye claimed that he had given part of his loot to charity, including to retinitis pigmentosa research. At the time he had robbed 17 banks and was serving time in Lompoc Federal Penitentiary, near Santa Barbara, California, due to be released 1993.
