= July 1933 =

Month of 1933

<<	July 1933					>>
Su	Mo	Tu	We	Th	Fr	Sa
						1
2	3	4	5	6	7	8
9	10	11	12	13	14	15
16	17	18	19	20	21	22
23	24	25	26	27	28	29
30	31

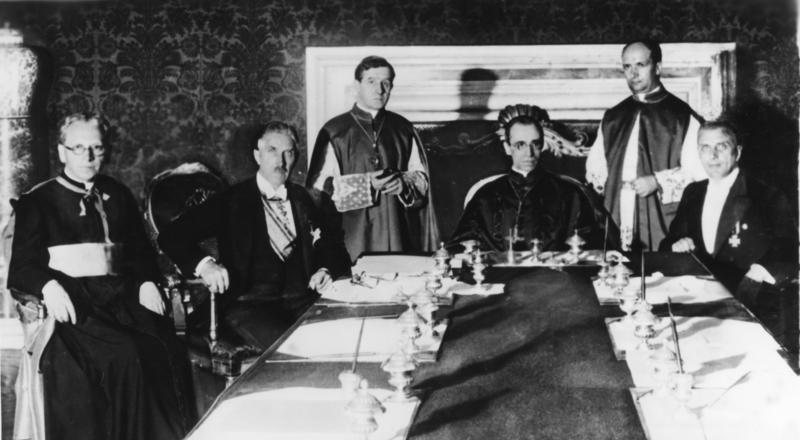
July 20, 1933: Nazi Germany's Franz von Papen, Vatican City's Eugenio Pacelli (both seated at head of table) sign pact

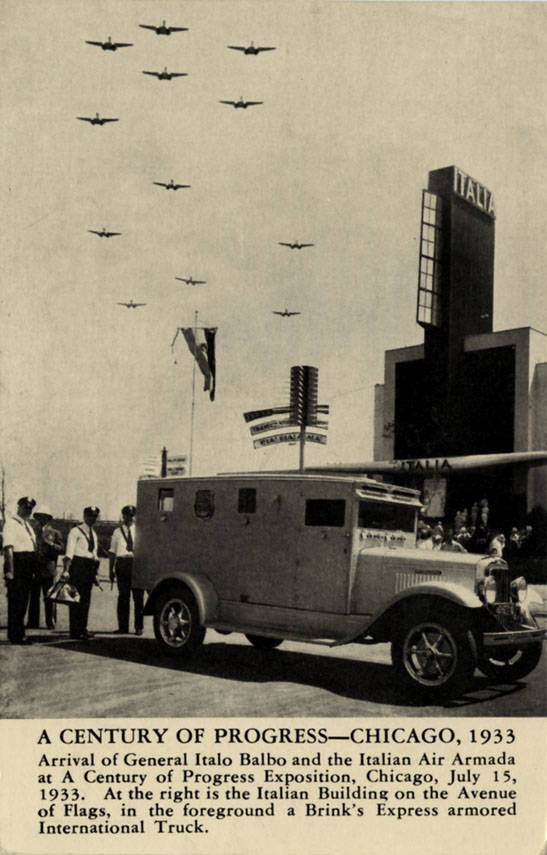
July 15, 1933: Italian air force of 25 planes appears at Chicago

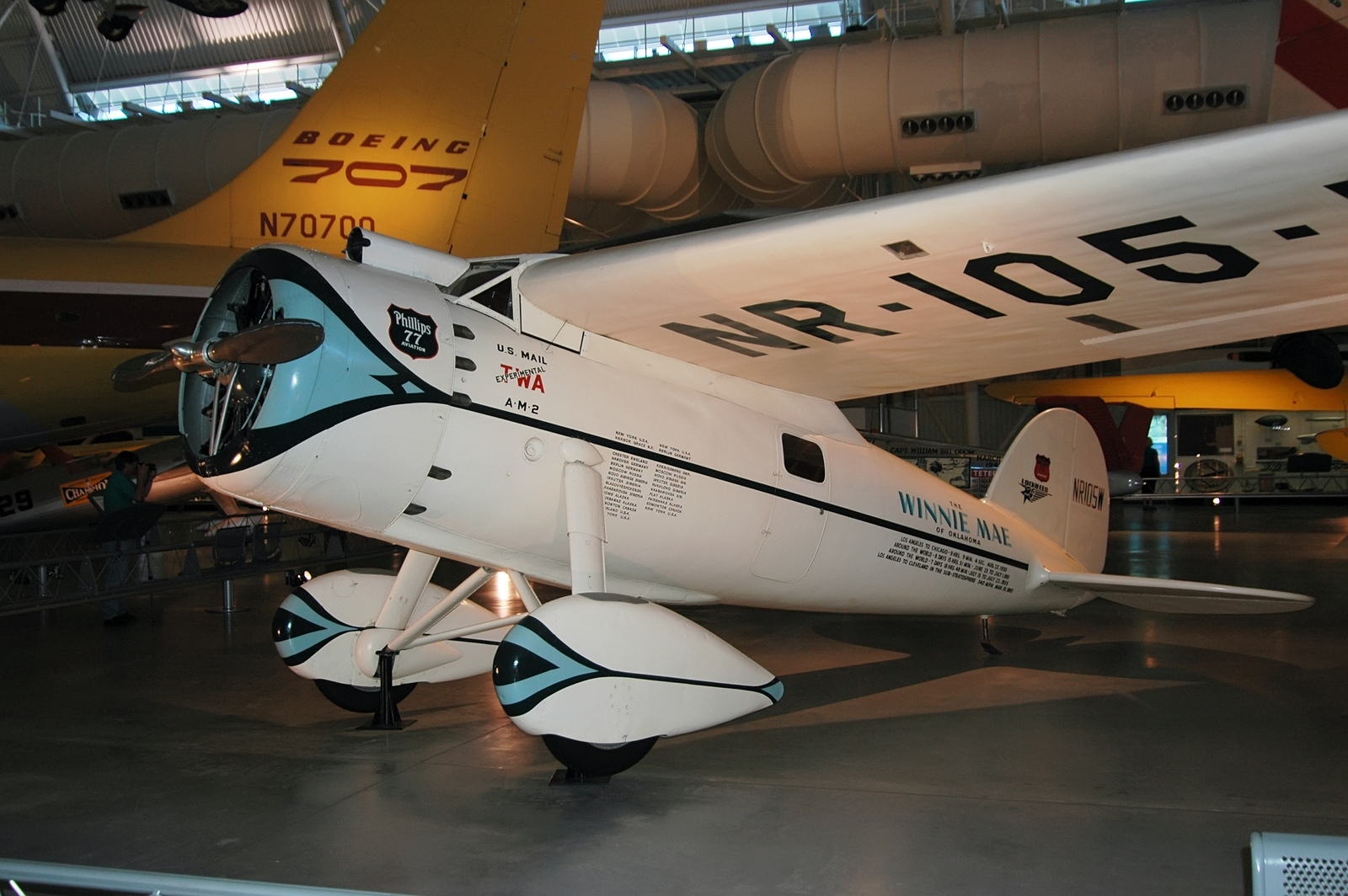
July 15–22, 1933: Wiley Post flies solo around the world in the Winnie Mae

The following events occurred in July 1933:

== July 1, 1933 (Saturday) ==
- The United Kingdom and the Soviet Union resumed trading, after the Soviets agreed to release the last of the British Metro-Vickers engineers who had been arrested and convicted of espionage. L.C. Thornton and William MacDonald arrived back in Britain on July 5.
- After Reverend Ludwig Müller, the head of Germany's new "Reich Church", said that Adolf Hitler was going to join the new organization, Hitler sent word through its news agency that the reports "are a fantasy and lies. Hitler belongs now, as previously, in the Catholic church and has no intention of leaving it."
- Italo Balbo, the Air Minister of Italy, and his "armada" of 25 seaplanes of the Italian Air Force set off from Orbetello at 5:45 am on the first leg of a 6,000 miles (9,700 km) trip to the World's Fair in Chicago.
- The London Passenger Transport Board was created, bringing all of London's mass transportation (underground subways, trams, and buses) and taxicabs under one authority.

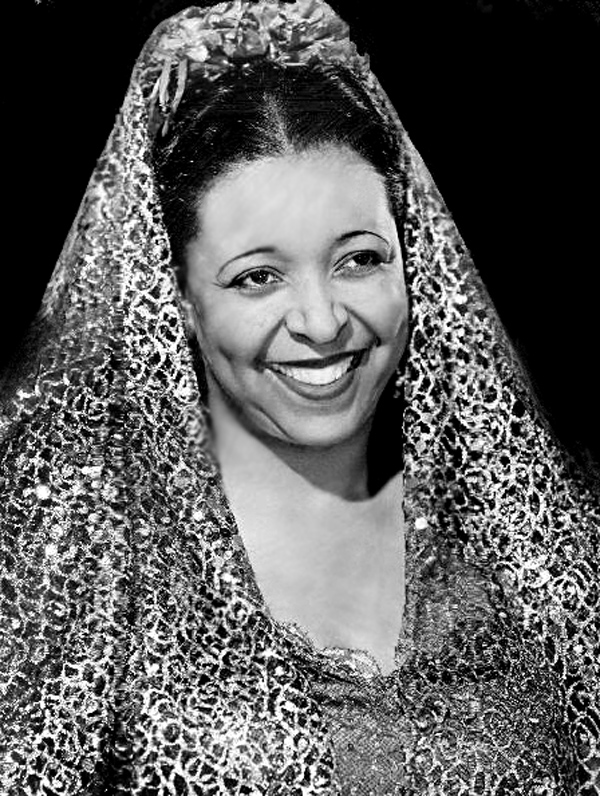
Ethel Waters

- Ethel Waters became the first African-American to have her own network radio show, after being signed to appear twice a week on the NBC Radio Network.
- The Douglas DC-1, the first commercial airline manufactured by the Douglas Aircraft Company, made its first flight, taking off from Clover Field at Santa Monica, California with Carl Cover and Fred Herman as pilots.

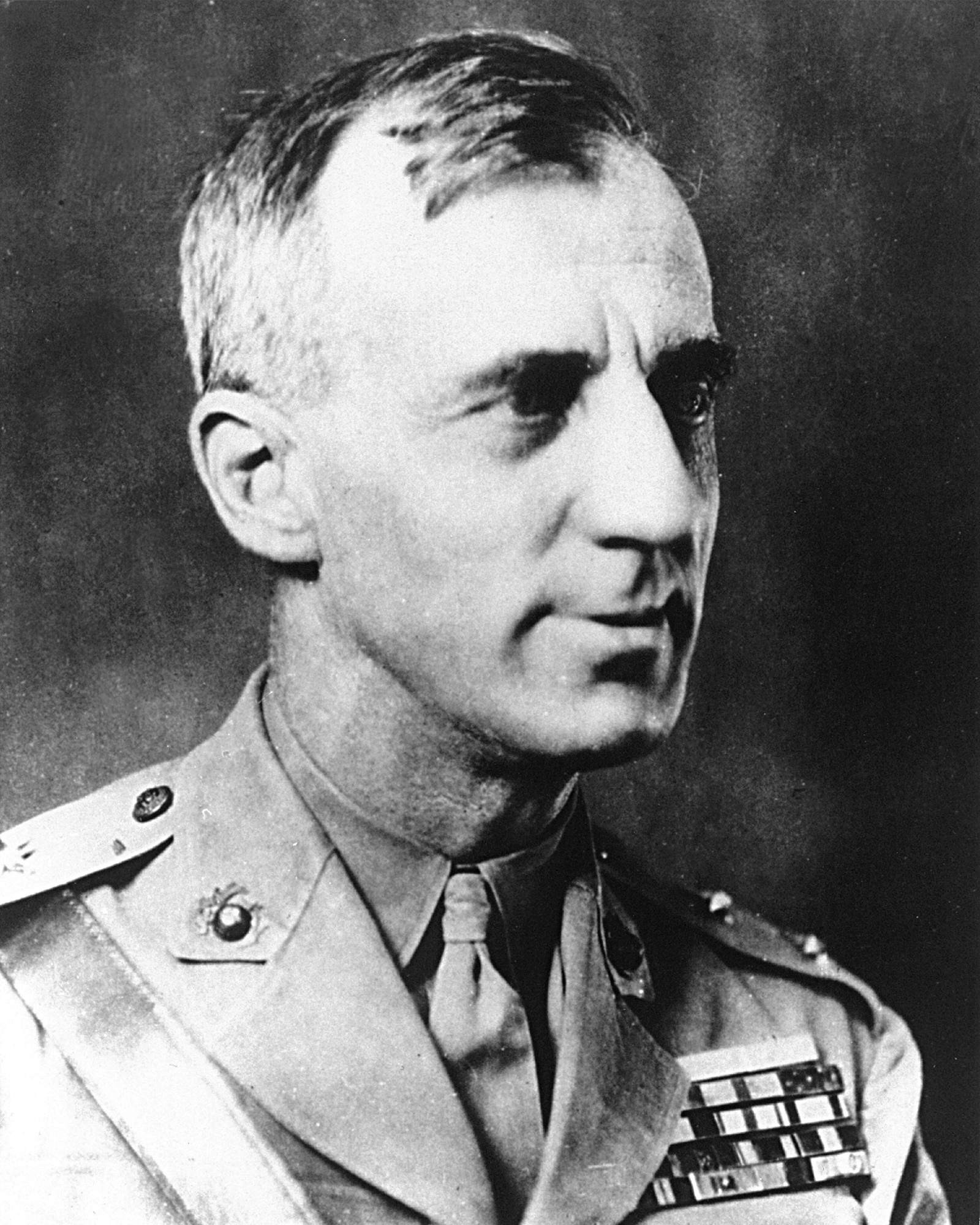
Maj. Gen. Butler (ret.)

- Retired USMC Major General Smedley Butler was approached for the first time by businessman Gerald C. MacGuire, ostensibly about running for National Commander of the American Legion. General Butler testified before Congress in 1934 that MacGuire would visit frequently, proposing that Butler lead veterans in a coup against the United States government.
- Died: Albert Erskine, 62, President of the Studebaker Corporation, shot himself after being despondent over declining sales for the automaker.

== July 2, 1933 (Sunday) ==
- Romania's King Carol II was visiting an arms factory near Cluj when a soldier, startled by a shout from a nearby officer, began firing a new model machine gun in the King's direction. Bullets passed within 2 feet (0.61 m) of the monarch, who was unharmed.
- In what has been described as "one of the greatest games in the history of baseball", baseball pitcher Carl Hubbell of the New York Giants pitched 18 innings without walking a single batter on the St. Louis Cardinals, whose Tex Carleton matched Hubbell for the first 16 innings in a 0–0 deadlock. In the 18th inning, New York won the game 1–0 after Carleton was replaced by reliever Jesse Haines.

== July 3, 1933 (Monday) ==
- U.S. President Roosevelt stunned and angered the rest of the world in a message transmitted to the delegates of the World Economic Conference in London, announcing that the U.S. would remain off of the gold standard in order to pursue long-term price stability at home, rather than immediate international currency stabilization. "This is not the time to dissipate gold reserves", said Roosevelt, adding, "When the world works out concerted policies in the majority of nations to produce balanced budgets and living within their means, then we can properly discuss a better distribution of the world's gold and silver supply... the United States of America seeks the kind of dollar which a generation hence will have the same purchasing and debt-paying power as the dollar value we hope to attain in the near future." On July 8, France, Italy, Belgium, the Netherlands, Switzerland, and Poland made a declaration that they would continue to peg their currencies to the price of gold damaging their economies in the long run.
- The Convention for the Definition of Aggression, first to agree on a legal meaning for the term, was signed by eight nations at the Soviet Union's embassy in London, as the USSR worked out an agreement with its neighbors (Afghanistan, Estonia, Iran, Latvia, Poland, Romania and Turkey). "Aggression" had been forbidden by the Kellogg-Briand Peace Pact in 1928, but not explained. "Aggression" included attacks on territory, naval vessels or aircraft, a naval blockade, aid to armed bands "formed on the territory of a State", or failing "to deprive the bands of any aid and protection".
- Died: Hipólito Yrigoyen, 82, President of Argentina 1922–30

== July 4, 1933 (Tuesday) ==
- Howard Moffat, described by a later observer as "the Herbert Hoover of colonial Zimbabwe" resigned as Prime Minister of Southern Rhodesia after six years, and was succeeded by George Mitchell.

== July 5, 1933 (Wednesday) ==
- The remaining opposition political party in Germany, the Catholic Center Party, voted to disband.
- Austria's Chancellor Engelbert Dollfuss reached a concordat with the Vatican, giving the Roman Catholic Church greater influence over Austrian schools.
- COMEX, the Commodity Exchange, was formed by the merger of four separate trading forums (National Metal, Rubber, National Raw Silk and New York Hide Exchanges). COMEX would merge into the New York Mercantile Exchange (NYMEX) in 1994.
- Died: Charles N. Haskell, 73, first Governor of Oklahoma

== July 6, 1933 (Thursday) ==
- The first Major League Baseball All-Star Game was played at Comiskey Park in Chicago, in order to raise money for a fund to assist retired major league players. A home run by Babe Ruth in the 3rd inning drove in 2 runs and gave the American League stars a 4–2 win over the National League. All of the players were selected by a vote from the fans. Originally envisioned as a one-time exhibition coinciding with Chicago's World's Fair, the contest became an annual event.

== July 7, 1933 (Friday) ==
- Jimmie Mattern, the American flyer who had disappeared on June 14 while trying to complete the first solo airplane flight around the world, was able to get out word that he had survived. Mattern, missing for more than three weeks, was able to send a telegram from the Siberian city of Bocharova with the words "Safe at Anadyr, Chukotka, Siberia. Jimmie Mattern."
- U.S. Attorney General Homer S. Cummings said that about $2,000,000 worth of gold had been returned, but that 211 other persons were hoarding $1,297,057 in gold.
- With the United States off of the gold standard, the value of the American dollar against the British pound dropped by 30 percent, while average prices on the New York Stock Exchange went up.
- "Old Jack Quinn" pitched his last Major League Baseball game, six days after his 50th birthday, with one inning for the Cincinnati Reds in an 8–5 win over the Boston Braves.
- The Securities Act of 1933 took effect in the United States, with 41 firms registering with the FTC in order to do business on Wall Street.
- Born:
  - Murray Halberg, New Zealand runner in 5000 meter race, 1960 Olympic gold medalist; in Eketāhuna (d. 2022)
  - David McCullough, American historian and author; in Pittsburgh (d. 2022)
  - Bruce Wells, English boxer/actor who won 385 fights and lost 3 as an amateur; in Harlesden (d. 2009)
- Died:
  - Neal "Mickey" Finn, 29, American baseball player and second baseman for the Philadelphia Phillies up until June 17, died of complications following a June 25 surgery for an ulcer.
  - Mykola Skrypnyk, 61, former Ukrainian SSR Commissar of Education, shot himself to death after being fired during a purge of Ukrainian officials on orders of Soviet dictator Joseph Stalin.

== July 8, 1933 (Saturday) ==
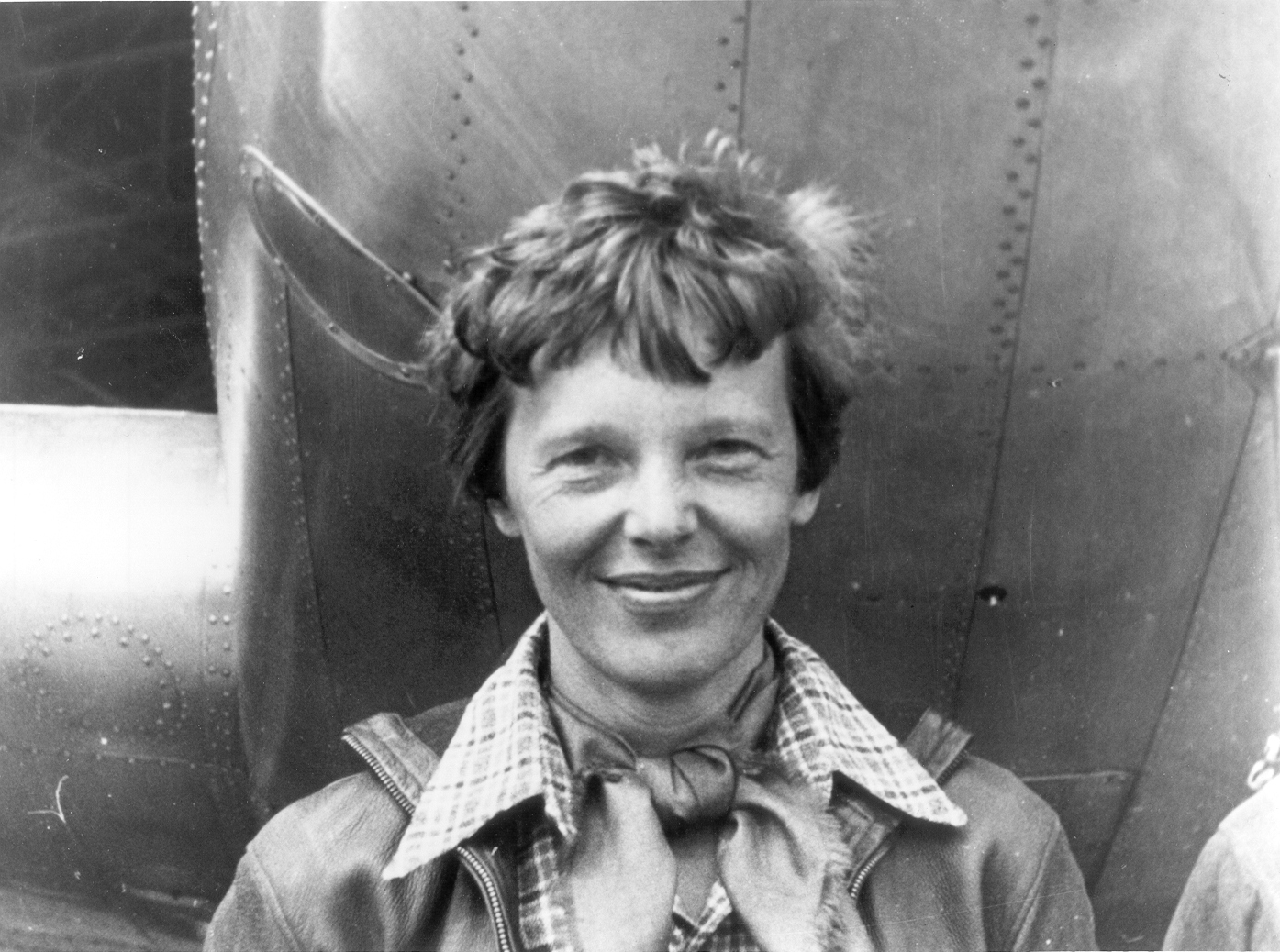
"Mrs. Amelia Putnam"

- Amelia Earhart, officially Amelia Earhart Putnam and referred to in the press as "Mrs. Putnam", arrived at Newark at 9:19 pm after crossing the United States in 17 hours and 7 minutes for a new airplane speed record.
- The first rugby union test match between the two countries was played between the Wallabies of Australia and the Springboks of South Africa at Newlands in Cape Town.
- After Pennsylvania's long-time ban against Sunday sports was lifted, the Pittsburgh Steelers and the Philadelphia Eagles were awarded franchises by the National Football League at its annual owners' meeting in Chicago.
- Born:
  - Antonio Lamer, 16th Chief Justice of Canada from 1990 to 2000; in Montreal (d. 2007)
  - Peter Orlovsky, American poet and partner of Allen Ginsberg; in New York City (d. 2010)

== July 9, 1933 (Sunday) ==
- The Convention for Limiting the Manufacture and Regulating the Distribution of Narcotic Drugs, which had been signed in 1931 by 39 nations came into effect. The United States ratified it the next day.
- The results of the 1933 Finnish parliamentary election were announced, showing that the Social Democrats had gained 12 seats, while the conservative and Agrarian parties all lost seats. No party had a majority in the 200 seat Parliament, and a coalition was formed by incumbent Prime Minister Toivo Mikael Kivimäki.;
- Seventy people, on an excursion up the Volga River, drowned when an overcrowded boat overturned at Yaroslavl. The accident was not disclosed by the Soviet press until five days later.
- Born: Hedrick Smith, Scottish-born reporter for the New York Times and correspondent for the PBS show Frontline, Pulitzer Prize and Emmy Award winner; in Kilmacolm

== July 10, 1933 (Monday) ==
- A day before a right-wing group called the "Divine Soldiers" was planning to overthrow the government of Japan, police in Tokyo foiled the plot by arresting the conspirators. The plan had been to bomb the office of Prime Minister Saitō Makoto during a cabinet meeting, then to set up a new government headed by the Emperor Hirohito's uncle, Prince Naruhiko Higashikuni, or the Emperor's younger brother, Prince Chichibu; details were suppressed for several years, and the conspirators received light sentences.
- Born:
  - C. K. Yang (Yang Chuan-kwang), Taiwanese decathlete, silver medalist in the 1960 Summer Olympics; in Taitung (d. 2007)
  - Richard G. Hatcher, African-American politician, Mayor of Gary, Indiana 1968–88; in Michigan City, Indiana (d. 2019)
  - Kevin Gilbert, Australian author; in Condobolin, New South Wales (d. 1993)
- Died:
  - Joseph Urban, 61, Austrian stage designer and illustrator
  - John Markle, 74, American philanthropist and co-founder of the Markle Foundation
  - Sir Reginald Beatty Wolseley, 61, nicknamed "The Elevator Boy Baronet". Wolseley had left England in 1897 at the age of 25 and become an elevator operator at a hotel in Waterloo, Iowa. Known as Dick Wolseley in the U.S., he was elevated to the baronetcy after his cousin, Sir Capel Charles Wolseley, died in 1923.

== July 11, 1933 (Tuesday) ==
- Executive Order 6202A was issued by U.S. President Roosevelt, creating the 24 member Executive Council, combining the ten members of the President's cabinet and 14 administrators of various federal agencies, to meet every Tuesday afternoon with Roosevelt. Further Executive Orders (6433A, 6770 and 6889A) would experiment with a supercabinet before the idea was abandoned in 1937.
- Forty people were missing after a motorboat with 130 passengers and crew went down near Matsuyama in Japan. Ninety others were rescued.
- A Nazi German decree made it illegal for any parent to give the name Hitler, or any variant, to a child.

== July 12, 1933 (Wednesday) ==
- The Vienna newspaper Oesterreichische Abendblatt published a three-page story claiming proof that Adolf Hitler was "directly descended on his mother's side" from a Jewish family in Czechoslovakia, and that there were at least ten Jews named Hitler in the city of Polná. Alexander Basch, the recently deceased city registrar, had identified a sister of Hitler's grandmother as having been a Jew who moved from Polna to Vienna when both places were part of the Austro-Hungarian Empire.
- Born: Donald E. Westlake, American mystery author with 65 novels under 16 pseudonyms (primarily "Richard Stark") as well as his own name; in Brooklyn, New York City(d. 2008)

== July 13, 1933 (Thursday) ==
- The use of "Heil Hitler!" as a greeting and as a closing in letters, and the "Nazi salute", with the right hand and arm extended upward, became mandatory for all German government employees, by order of Interior Minister Wilhelm Frick.
- An explosion at the H.H. Cross Oil refinery at Smackover, Arkansas, killed seven people and injured three.
- The Ski Club of Great Britain abandoned the term ski running, and replaced it with ski-ing, later spelled skiing; that, and the term "ski runner" (now "skier") passed into oblivion.
- Born: David Storey, English author, in Wakefield, Yorkshire (d. 2017)
- Died: George Kotsonaros, 40, Greek-born silent film actor and professional wrestler, was killed in an automobile accident.

== July 14, 1933 (Friday) ==
- The Law for the Prevention of Hereditarily Diseased Offspring (Gesetz zur Verhütung erbkranken Nachwuchses) was decreed in Nazi Germany, initially providing for the compulsory sterilization of persons with mental retardation ("hereditary feeblemindedness"), bipolar disorder, schizophrenia, epilepsy, and persons born with handicaps. To review cases, a network of "hereditary health courts" (Erbgesundheitsgericht) was created when the law took effect in 1934. Between 1933 and 1945, 400,000 Aryan Germans were rendered unable to have children, as the definition of mental illness was expanded to include homeless people, prostitutes, petty criminals and juvenile delinquents. Between 1939 and 1945, at least 5,000 mentally or physically disabled children were committed to "special pediatric wards", where they were euthanized, usually by a lethal overdose of medicine. The official numbers did not include handicapped Jews, Gypsies and other non-Aryan people, who did not fall under the jurisdiction of the "health courts", and who were put to death in concentration camps.
- Born: Franz, Duke of Bavaria, in Munich, German businessman and art collector, and head of the House of Wittelsbach, the former ruling family of the Kingdom of Bavaria. As 'Franz Herzog' he was interned as a child in the Dachau extermination camp along with other descendants of the Bavarian royal family. Franz would become the first head of a European royal dynasty to publicly acknowledge his same-sex partner. While recognized in 1996 by British Jacobites as heir to the House of Stuart (as the 9-great-grandson of Charles I of England) should the Act of Settlement 1701 be repealed, he made no pretense to the throne.

== July 15, 1933 (Saturday) ==
- Representatives of Europe's four major nations- the United Kingdom, Germany, France and Italy- signed the Four-Power Pact at Rome, pledging to reduce weapons and to avoid war for ten years.
- Wiley Post took off from New York at 4:10 am in an attempt to make a solo flight around the world. He flew the airplane Winnie Mae, which he and Harold Gatty had taken around the world in 1931.
- The Italian Armada of 24 seaplanes, commanded by General Italo Balbo, arrived in Chicago for the Century of Progress exposition, landing on the waters of Lake Michigan.
- Born:
  - Julian Bream, English guitarist; in London (d. 2020)
  - Guido Crepax, Italian comics artist who created Valentina; in Milan (d. 2003)
- Died:
  - Irving Babbitt, 68, American literary critic
  - Freddie Keppard, 44, American jazz musician

== July 16, 1933 (Sunday) ==
- Ground was broken for the Grand Coulee Dam, on the Columbia River in the state of Washington. Power would first be generated by the dam on March 22, 1941, and the 125 square mile lake that was created would be renamed Lake Roosevelt in 1950, after the President's death.
- Died:
  - Sir John Ellerman, 71, British businessman reputed to be the wealthiest man in the United Kingdom
  - Gilbert N. Haugen, U.S. Congressman for Iowa for 17 consecutive terms, since 1899

== July 17, 1933 (Monday) ==
- Former U.S. Senator Karl C. Schuyler of Colorado, who had completed his term four months earlier, was seriously injured after being knocked down by an automobile while walking in New York City's Central Park. Schuyler initially declined to go to the hospital, and then allowed himself to be admitted at Lenox Hill Hospital under the name "James Evans", where it was determined that he had a fractured pelvis. On July 28, when he was told that he was seriously ill, he finally identified himself to hospital authorities and asked them to notify his wife in Colorado Springs. Former Senator Schuyler died on July 31.
- The NIRA Cotton Textile Code went into effect, reducing the 54-hour workweek to 40 hours, with no cut in pay, for American mill workers, while raising the minimum wage to $13 per week. In response to the changes, the companies implemented the "stretch-out" and the "speed-up", doubling workloads and increasing the speed of machinery, then fired hundreds of employees who were unable to handle the expectations.

== July 18, 1933 (Tuesday) ==
- Edwin H. Land, who would later found the Polaroid Corporation, was granted U.S. Patent 1,918,848 for the mass production of polarized film.
- A 16-year-old boy, Edgar A. Gibson of Tulsa, Oklahoma, was fatally scalded by the geothermal waters of a geyser at Yellowstone National Park in the U.S., while he was camping at the park. He died of his burns on July 28. Reportedly, Gibson "accidentally slipped and fell while standing near the edge of the geyser" and was boiled.
- Born:
  - Syd Mead, American industrial and conceptual designer, in St. Paul, Minnesota (d. 2019)
  - Jean Yanne, French film actor and director; in Les Lilas near Paris (d. 2003)

== July 19, 1933 (Wednesday) ==
- New York model Lucille Ball, 22, boarded a train to Hollywood, after an agent signed her to appear as part of the chorus for the Eddie Cantor film Roman Scandals, and began a successful career in film and television. In 1937, after four years of small roles in 18 films, Ball appeared as one of the stars of the film Stage Door.

== July 20, 1933 (Thursday) ==
- Cardinal Eugenio Pacelli, Vatican Secretary of State and the future Pope Pius XII, and German Vice-Chancellor Franz von Papen signed an agreement at Vatican City. The Vatican agreed to discourage its priests and associations from political activity, in return for Germany agreeing not to interfere with church schools or the Vatican's imposition of the Code of Canon Law upon the Catholic Church in Germany. Ratification of the 33 articles, which are still in effect, would take place on September 10.
- U.S. President Roosevelt welcomed Italian Air Minister Balbo at the White House, along with 30 officers of the Italian Armada.
- A priest and eleven children, on an excursion on a lake near Bourges, France, drowned after their boat capsized, while four other children were able to swim to shore.
- Born:
  - Cormac McCarthy, American novelist; in Providence, Rhode Island (d. 2023)
  - Buddy Knox, American rock and roll singer known for the 1957 hit "Party Doll"; in Happy, Texas (d. 1999)

== July 21, 1933 (Friday) ==
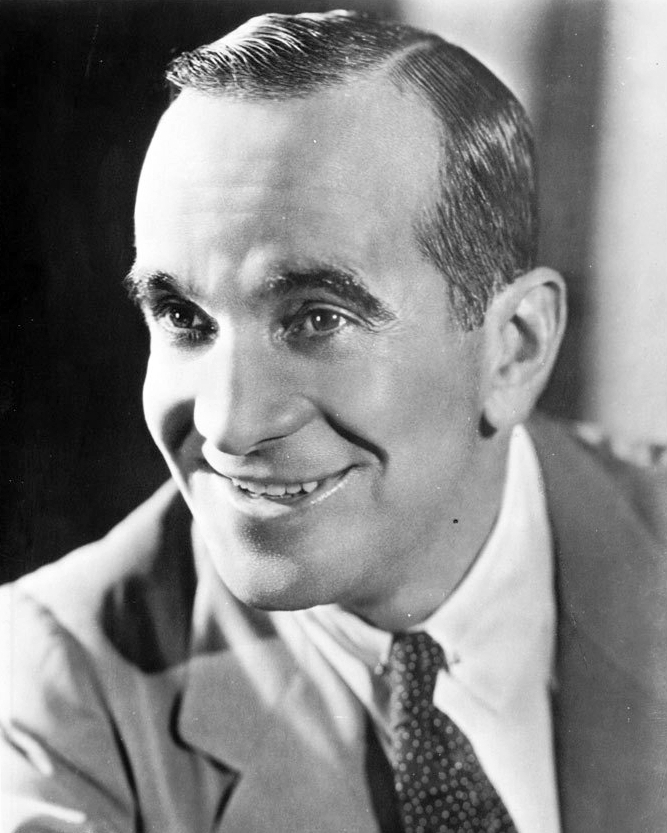
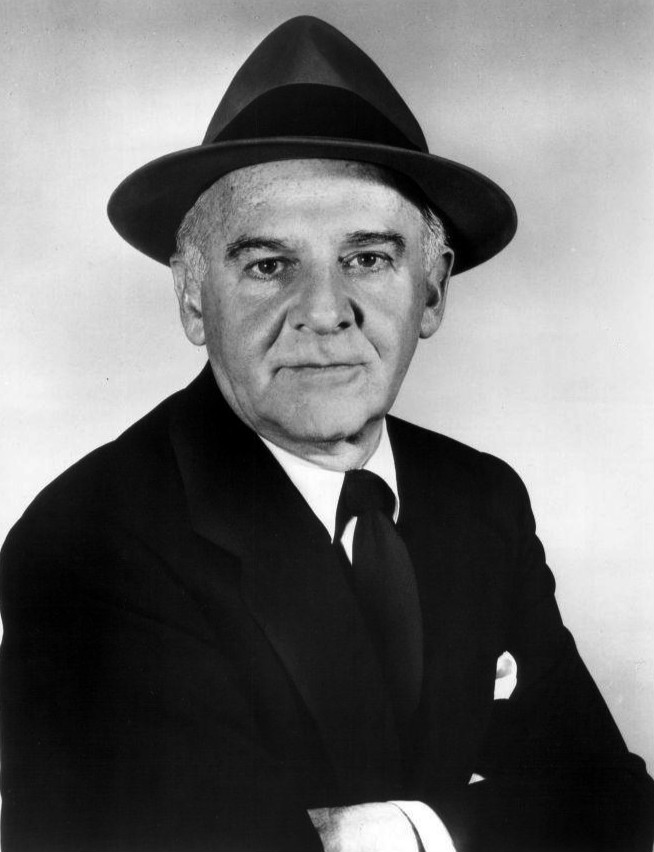
Actor Jolson and columnist Winchell
- Actor and comedian Al Jolson punched nationally syndicated gossip columnist Walter Winchell before a crowd of 4,000 people in Hollywood. Jolson felt that Winchell's screenplay for Broadway Through a Keyhole had been based on Jolson's romance with Ruby Keeler. A United Press writer acknowledged talk that it was a publicity stunt, but added, "If it was, it was a painful one for Winchell," who was knocked down after being punched in the neck.
- The drama film The Stranger's Return starring Miriam Hopkins, Lionel Barrymore and Franchot Tone was released.
- Born: John Gardner, American novelist known for Grendel, the retelling of the Beowulf saga from the monster's POV; in Batavia, New York (killed in accident, 1982)
- Died: Father Charles Uncles, 74, first African-American Catholic priest. His death left only two black Catholic priests in the U.S., Norman Dukette and Charles Logan.

== July 22, 1933 (Saturday) ==
- Wiley Post became the first person to fly solo around the world, traveling 15,596 mi (25,099 km) in 7 days 18 hours 45 minutes, landing 30 seconds before midnight at New York's Floyd Bennett Field, where he had departed on July 15.
- George "Machine-Gun" Kelly and Albert Bates kidnapped Charles F. Urschel, an Oklahoma oilman, from his home in Oklahoma City and demanded $200,000 ransom. After the money was paid, Urschel was released on August 1. Kelly would be captured on September 26.
- French engineer Georges Artsrouni was issued the first patent for a machine translation system, which he dubbed the "Mechanical Brain". The data for translation was "a broad band of paper which passed behind a keyboard" and was moved by an electric motor.
- Italian Prime Minister Benito Mussolini fired his War Minister, Pietro Gazzera, and named himself as the replacement.
- Caterina Jarboro became the first African-American opera singer to perform at a major opera house, appearing at the New York Hippodrome for the Chicago Civic Opera in the title role of Aida.

== July 23, 1933 (Sunday) ==
- About 400,000 elders and boardmembers of Germany's various Protestant churches participated in a "general church election" to approve the German Evangelical Church.
- Born:
  - Bert Convy (Bernard W. Convy), American game show host, actor, and singer; in St. Louis (d. 1991)
  - Father Benedict Groeschel, American Catholic priest and talk show host; in Jersey City, New Jersey (d. 2014)
- Died: J. M. Sen Gupta, 48, Indian independence activist who served as Mayor of Calcutta from 1929 to 1930, died while in prison in Ranchi in the Bihar and Orissa Province.

== July 24, 1933 (Monday) ==
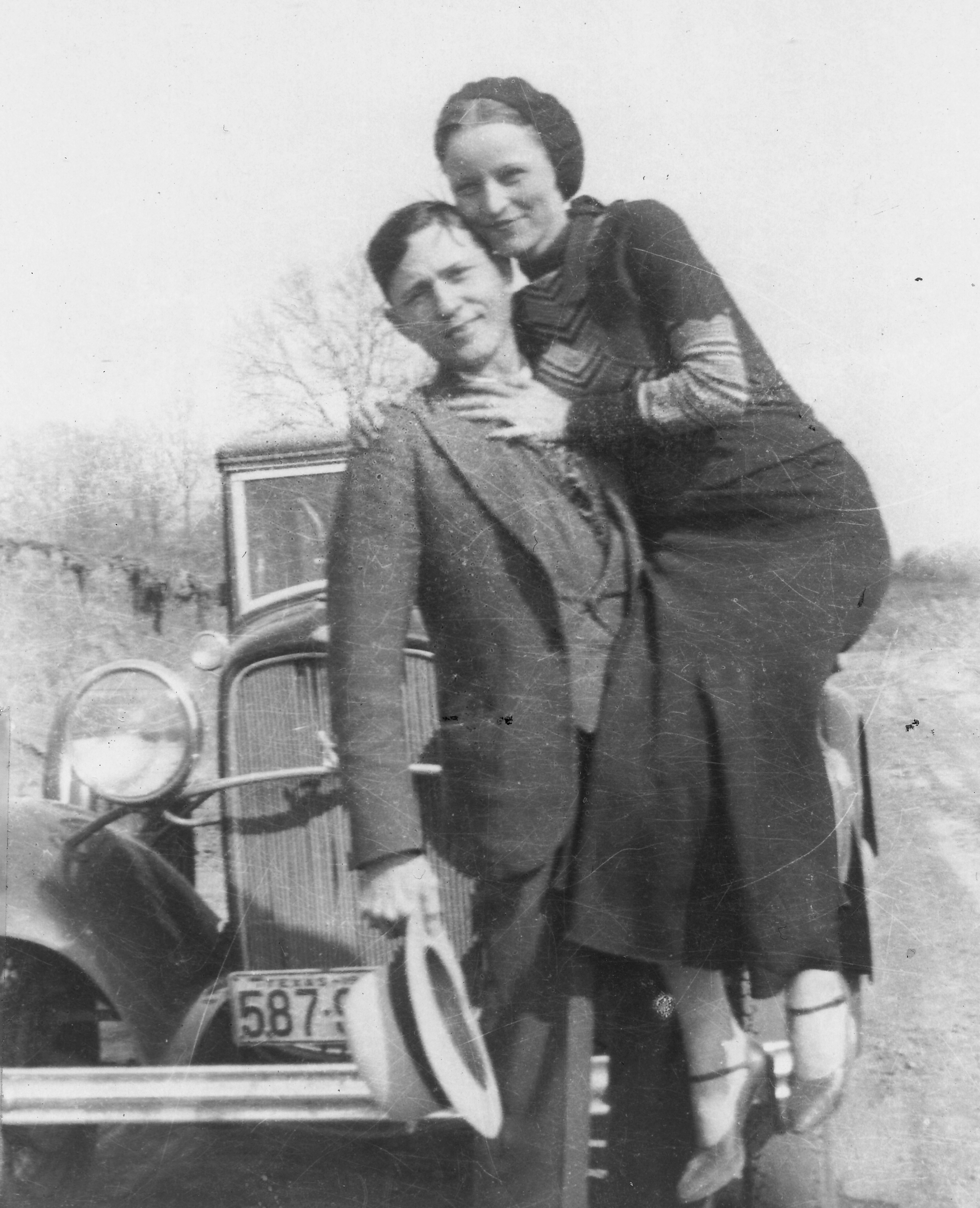
Escaped: Bonnie and Clyde

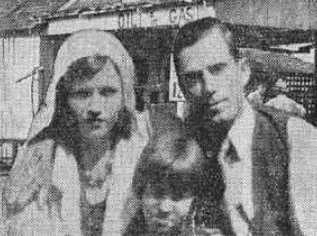
Captured: Buck and Blanche

- "Bonnie and Clyde" (Gangsters Bonnie Parker and Clyde Barrow) escaped a gun battle with police at Dexter, Iowa, along with fellow gang member W. D. Jones. Clyde's brother, Buck Barrow and Buck's wife, Blanche, were captured. Buck, who had been shot in the head on July 19 in Platte City, Missouri, was wounded again. Buck would die five days later, while Bonnie and Clyde would be killed on May 23, 1934. Blanche and W.D. would serve prison sentences.
- The International Rescue Committee was founded in New York City at the suggestion of Albert Einstein, in order to assist "victims of racial, religious, and ethnic persecution and oppression, as well as people uprooted by war, violence and famine to survive and rebuild their lives".
- President Roosevelt defended the New Deal in a fireside chat to American radio listeners, saying, "There is nothing complicated about it. It goes back to the basic idea of society and of the nation itself that people acting in a group can accomplish things which no individual acting alone could even hope to bring about. FDR also coined the term "the first hundred days" to refer to the initial accomplishments of an American President and a new Congress, though he was referring to the 100-day session of the 73rd United States Congress between March 9 and June 17.
- Born: John Aniston (stage name for Yannis Anastassakis), Greek-born American soap opera actor known for Days of Our Lives; in Chania, Crete (died 2022)
- Died: Max von Schillings, 65, German conductor

== July 25, 1933 (Tuesday) ==
- France informed China that it was occupying and claiming nine of the Paracel Islands as territory for French Indochina., but did not specify which of the 30 it was taking sovereignty over. It soon became apparent that they were the uninhabited Spratly Islands.
- Labor unrest, that would topple the government of Cuban President Gerardo Machado, started with "a relatively innocuous strike" by the drivers for the Havana bus system over the threat of wage cuts. Four days later, Havana's streetcars and taxis were shut down by strikes, then ships and railroads. Machado declared martial law on August 5, but was overthrown a week later.

== July 26, 1933 (Wednesday) ==
- Erich Koch, Gauleiter of East Prussia, proudly announced to Chancellor Hitler that unemployment in his province had been eliminated.
- The International Silver Agreement was signed in London as part of the World Economic Conference.
- Minor league baseball player Joe DiMaggio's record, for consecutive games of getting at least one hit, was ended at 61 by Ed Walsh, Jr. DiMaggio, whose San Francisco Seals would still defeat Walsh's Oakland Oaks, 4–3 that day, would set the Major League Baseball record of a 56-game hitting streak in 1941.
- Died: Charles Tindley, 82, African-American hymn writer

== July 27, 1933 (Thursday) ==
- The World Economic Conference ended in London after more than six unsuccessful weeks, with the British Commonwealth Declaration being made by the member nations to remain off of the gold standard and to keep exchange rates stable within the Commonwealth.
- Born:
  - Ted Whitten, Australian rules football star, who played 360 games for Footscray 1951–1970, and coached from 1957 to 1971; in Braybrook, Victoria (d. 1995)
  - Nick Reynolds, American folk singer in The Kingston Trio; in San Diego (d. 2008)
- Died:
  - James E. Talmage, 70, American Mormon theologian and one of the 12 apostles of the Latter Day Saints Church
  - Japanese Field Marshal Nobuyoshi Muto, 63, the Empire's envoy to and de facto ruler of the puppet state of Manchukuo, committed ritual suicide.

== July 28, 1933 (Friday) ==
- The first singing telegram was introduced by Western Union as a publicity stunt for singer Rudy Vallee's 32nd birthday. George P. Oslin, press agent for Western, called Vallee's agent to get the singer's telephone number, then had Lucille Lipps, an operator from Western's Telephone Bureau, call Vallee to sing "Happy Birthday" over the phone. Walter Winchell later wrote about the stunt in his gossip column.

== July 29, 1933 (Saturday) ==
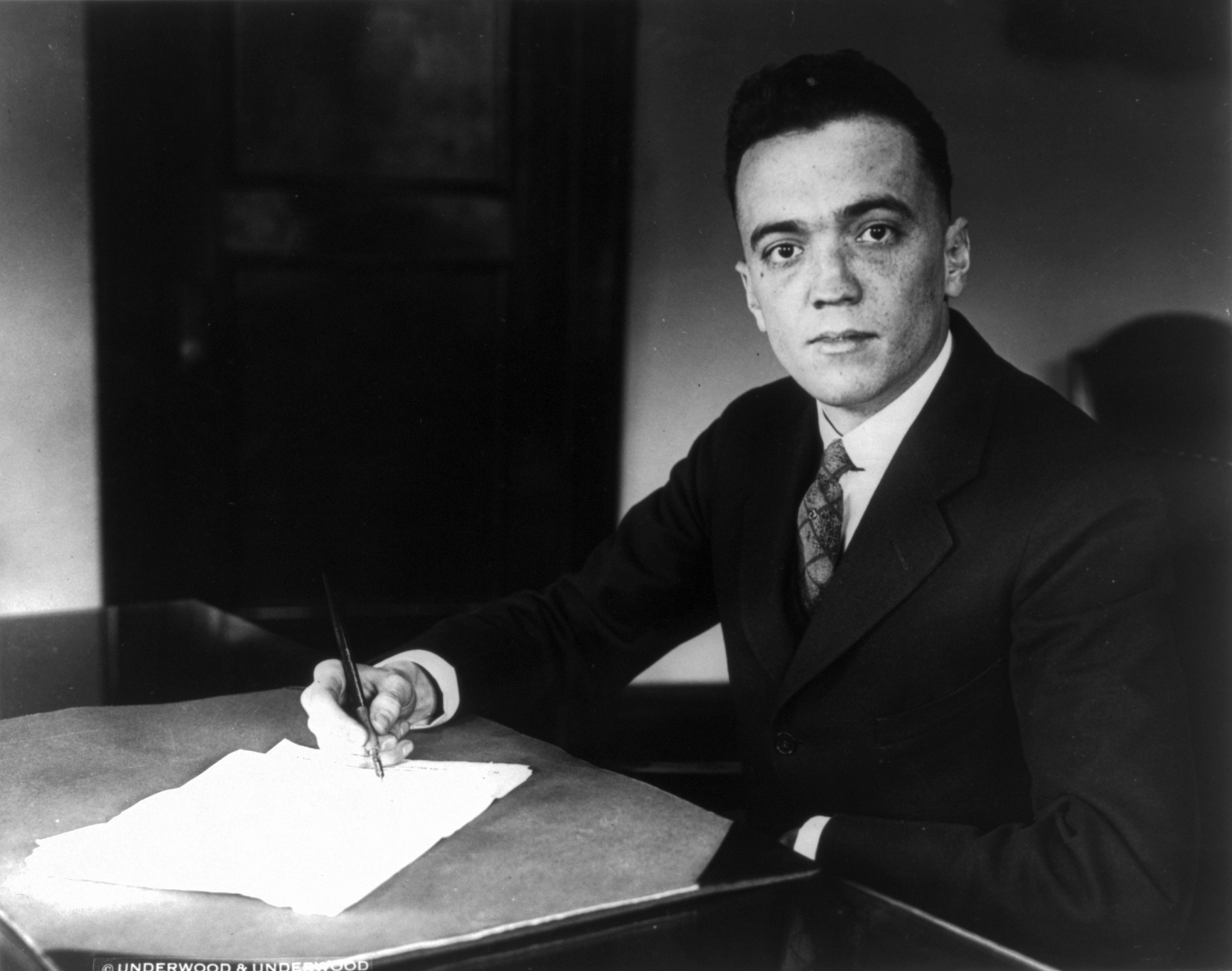
J. Edgar Hoover

- After months of uncertainty over whether he would continue as Director of the American FBI in the new Democrat administration of President Roosevelt, J. Edgar Hoover was reappointed, on recommendation of Attorney General Homer Cummings. The other major choice had been NYPD Detective Val O'Farrell.
- Born:
  - Peter Baldwin, British TV actor known for portraying Derek Wilton on Coronation Street;, in Chichester (d. 2015)
  - Robert Fuller (stage name for Leonard Leroy Lee) American TV actor known for Laramie and Emergency!; in Troy, New York
  - Lou Albano, Italian-born American professional wrestler and actor; in Rome (d. 2009)
- Died: Buck Barrow, American gangster, died ten days after sustaining head wounds in a gun battle with police in Missouri.

== July 30, 1933 (Sunday) ==
- Dizzy Dean set a modern Major League Baseball record by striking out 17 batters in an 8–2 victory for his St. Louis Cardinals over the Chicago Cubs. In the same game, the other side of the battery, Dean's catcher Jimmy Wilson, set a record of 18 putouts. After the game, he said, "Heck, if anybody told me I was setting a record, I'd have got me some more strikeouts." Bob Feller would hurl 18 strikeouts in 1938; the current record of 20 strikeouts is held by Roger Clemens and Kerry Wood, while the record of 20 putouts is held by five players.

== July 31, 1933 (Monday) ==
- Jack Armstrong, the All-American Boy, which would run six afternoons a week as a radio serial until 1950, was broadcast for the first time.
- The Istanbul Darülfünun, founded in 1863 to revive scientific and technical education in the Ottoman Empire, was closed and its 147 professors were fired. The next day, 65 would be hired to the new reformed Istanbul University.
- President Roosevelt established the nine member Science Advisory Board by Executive Order 6238, the first of several bodies of scientists to advise the United States President.
- Died: Former U.S. Senator Karl C. Schuyler, 56, died of injuries sustained after being struck on July 17 by a car.
