= September 1933 =

Month of 1933

<<	September 1933					>>
Su	Mo	Tu	We	Th	Fr	Sa
					1	2
3	4	5	6	7	8	9
10	11	12	13	14	15	16
17	18	19	20	21	22	23
24	25	26	27	28	29	30

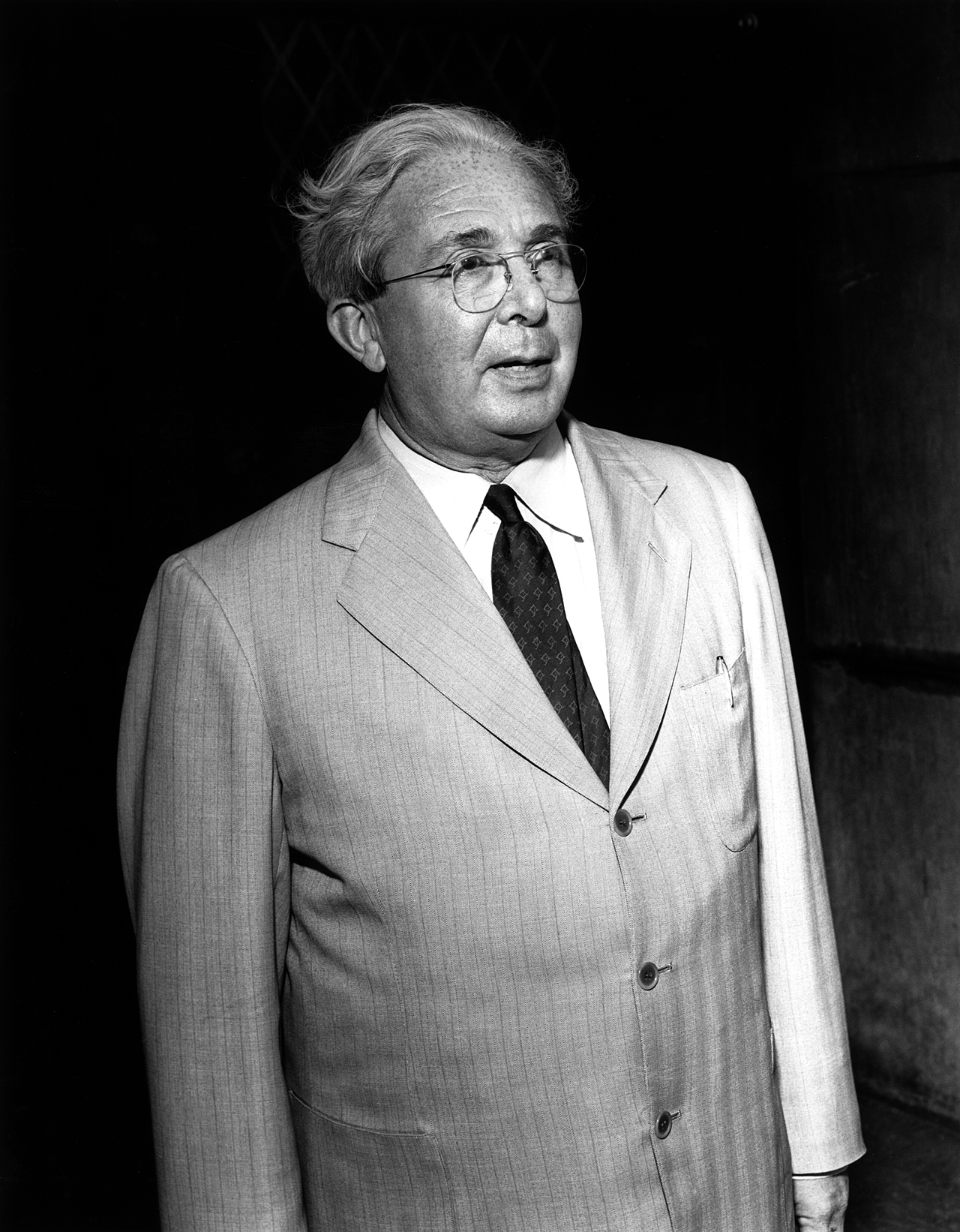
September 12, 1933: Leó Szilárd gains an insight...

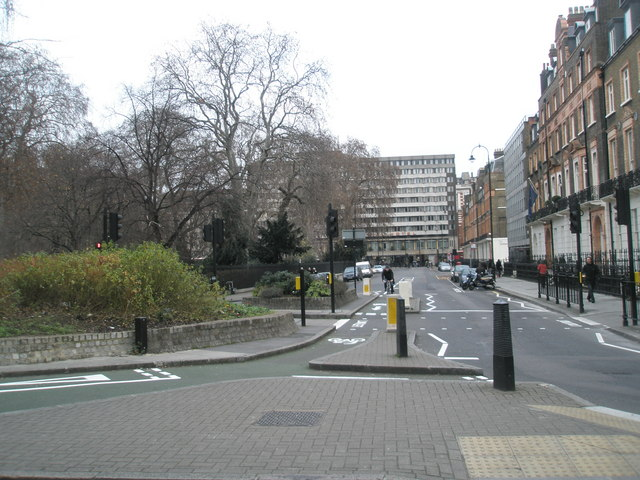
...at Southampton Row and Russell Square...

...on nuclear chain reaction

The following events occurred in September 1933:

== September 1, 1933 (Friday) ==
- U.S. Interior Secretary Harold L. Ickes issued an order forbidding racial discrimination in hiring on any Public Works Administration funded projects, including any businesses awarded a PWA contract.
- At a Nazi Party rally in Nuremberg, Adolf Hitler announced that the time had come for "a new artistic renaissance of the Aryan human being", rejecting Jewish and Bolshevik forms of painting and sculpture, such as abstract art, cubism, Dadaism and surrealism.
- Author Upton Sinclair declared his candidacy for the Democratic Party nomination for Governor of California in the 1934 elections. Sinclair, a former Socialist, would introduce his platform, the End Poverty in California movement (E.P.I.C.) and win the nomination, but lose the general election to Republican Governor Frank Merriam.
- The Autobiography of Alice B. Toklas, written by Gertrude Stein, was released to bookstores, after parts of it had been serialized in Atlantic Monthly, and became a literary classic.
- The romantic comedy film One Sunday Afternoon starring Gary Cooper and Fay Wray was released.
- Born:
  - Conway Twitty (stage name for Harold Jenkins), American country music singer; in Friars Point, Mississippi (d. 1993)
  - Ann Richards, Governor of Texas, 1991–95; as Dorothy Ann Willis in Lakeview, Texas (d. 2006)
  - Gene Harris, American jazz pianist; in Benton Harbor, Michigan (d. 2000)
  - Gwynfor Evans, Welsh politician who was the first MP from the Welsh independence political party Plaid Cymru; in Barry, Vale of Glamorgan (d. 2005)
- Died: Jack Donaldson, 47, Australian runner whose marks for fastest times in the 100 yard dash and 130 yards, were not recognized because he competed as a professional

== September 2, 1933 (Saturday) ==
- The Fascist government of Italy, and the Communist-governed Soviet Union, signed a treaty of "friendship, neutrality and non-aggression".
- With the signing of the Oil Code by American petroleum producers under the NIRA, U.S. Interior Secretary Ickes sent telegrams to the governors of oil-producing states, specifying the monthly production quota from each oil field.
- The Hotspur, a weekly "story paper" and later a comic book for British schoolchildren, published the first of 1,197 issues, lasting until October 17, 1959.
- Born: Mathieu Kérékou, President of Benin from 1972–1991, and 1996–2006; in Kouarfa (d. 2015)
- Died: Francesco de Pinedo, 43, Italian aviator, was killed when his plane crashed on takeoff from Floyd Bennett Field in New York City, before hundreds of spectators. De Pinedo was taking off in hopes of flying to Baghdad in record time, and his Bellanca airplane was loaded with 1,027 gallons of gasoline as he raced down the runway. Too heavy, the plane failed to lift off, struck a fence, and burst into flames, burning the flyer beyond recognition.

== September 3, 1933 (Sunday) ==
- The Irish political party Fine Gael was created by the merger of the parties Cumann na nGaedheal, the National Centre Party, and the National Guard Party, known as the Blueshirts. Blueshirts leader Eoin O'Duffy was the first to preside over the new organization.

== September 4, 1933 (Monday) ==
- At Camp Columbia, the Cuban Army base at Marianao, near Havana, Sergeant Fulgencio Batista led an uprising of non-commissioned officers against their Army superiors, seized control of the base, then incited a revolt that would topple the national government the next day.
- At the National Air Races in Chicago, aviator Jimmy Wedell became the first person to fly a landplane at an average of more than 300 miles per hour, averaging 304.98 mph in four runs on a three kilometer course. At the time, the record for a seaplane was 407 mph, set by George Stainforth in 1931. The feat was overshadowed by the death of 29 year old Florence Klingensmith, who had become the first woman to compete for the $10,000 Phillips Trophy. Her airplane fell apart as she passed the grandstand, and crashed at more than 200 mph.

== September 5, 1933 (Tuesday) ==
- The first regularly published list, of the most popular songs of the week, was started in the entertainment industry newspaper Variety.
- As the uprising in Cuba continued, Cuba's President Carlos Manuel de Céspedes y Quesada, in office for only a few weeks after the overthrow of Gerardo Machado, stepped aside in favor of a five-member junta allied with Sergeant Batista. The Pentarquia was led by law professor Guillermo Portela, accompanied by Jose Irizarri, Porfirio Franco, Sergio Carbó, and Ramon Grau. Within a week, Grau would become president, and Batista would be promoted to Army Chief of Staff. Batista would later become dictator of Cuba until being overthrown in an uprising by Fidel Castro.

== September 6, 1933 (Wednesday) ==
- Twenty-eight years after introducing the successful weekly entertainment magazine Variety, publisher Sime Silverman began publishing Daily Variety, Monday through Friday, in Hollywood. On the day issue #13 came out on September 22, Silverman died of a heart attack.
- Died: Marcel Journet, 65, French opera basso

== September 7, 1933 (Thursday) ==
- As the uprising in Cuba continued, the United States dispatched 16 destroyers to the island nation, bringing to 30 the number of U.S. Navy ships prepared to bring an invading force.
- Born:
  - Ela Bhatt, Indian lawyer, women's rights advocate and philanthropist, founder of the Self-Employed Women's Association of India, in Ahmedabad (d. 2022)
  - Tomoko Ohta, Japanese molecular biologist, in Miyoshi, Aichi
- Died: Edward Grey, 1st Viscount Grey of Fallodon, 71, British Foreign Secretary 1905 to 1916

== September 8, 1933 (Friday) ==
- King Faisal I of Iraq died of a heart attack in his hotel room in the Swiss city of Bern, where he had come earlier in the week for medical treatment. In 1920, he had been proclaimed King of Syria, but was deposed by France, and on August 23, 1921, he was approved by the United Kingdom as King of Iraq, following a plebiscite of approval. His 23-year-old son, Crown Prince Ghazi, was proclaimed as the new king two hours after the death was announced; King Ghazi would be killed in an auto accident in 1939; Faisal's grandson, Faisal II, would be assassinated in 1958 in a coup that abolished the monarchy.
- Born:
  - Donald Triplett, American banker who was the first person to ever be diagnosed with autism. Triplett was identified as "Donald T." and as "Case 1" by psychiatrist Leo Kanner in Dr. Kanner's 1943 study "Autistic Disturbances of Affective Contact"; in Forest, Mississippi (d.2023).
  - Michael Frayn, British playwright and novelist, winner of the 2000 Tony Award for Copenhagen; in Mill Hill, Middlesex

== September 9, 1933 (Saturday) ==
- The Miss America Pageant was revived after an absence of six years, returning to Atlantic City, New Jersey where it had taken place from 1921 to 1927. Winner of the Miss America 1933 title was Miss Connecticut, 15-year-old high-school student Marian Bergeron.
- Professor Albert Einstein arrived in London, after fleeing Belgium, where he had been under police protection following word that Nazi Germany was offering a bounty for his slayer. In October, he would move to the United States, settling in Princeton, New Jersey, where he would work at the Institute for Advanced Study in Princeton, New Jersey.

== September 10, 1933 (Sunday) ==
- The Reichskonkordat between Nazi Germany and Vatican City was ratified by both nations, with each pledging not to interfere with the other.
- The first Negro league baseball all-star game, dubbed the "East-West All-Star Game" for the Negro National League, was played one month after the white Major League Baseball teams held their first all-star game, and at the same venue, Comiskey Park in Chicago, where 20,000 attended. The West team beat the East, 11-7 with future Baseball Hall of Fame inductees Bill Foster, Mule Suttles, Willie Wells, and Turkey Stearnes, while the East had future Cooperstown inductees Josh Gibson, Satchel Paige, Judy Johnson and Biz Mackey. Cool Papa Bell, Jud Wilson, Oscar Charleston, Andy Cooper, and Manager John Henry Lloyd.
- Dr. Ramón Grau became the fourth President of Cuba in less than a month, after the Revolutionary Council elected him to take over from the junta that had overthrown President de Cespedes. He would serve for a few months, but would serve a four-year term later from 1944 to 1948.
- Born:
  - Yevgeny Khrunov, Soviet cosmonaut launched on Soyuz 4 and returned on Soyuz 5 in 1969; in Prudy, Tula Oblast, RSFSR (d. 2000)
  - Harmindar Singh Takhar, Indian-born British mathematician and chemical engineer; in Punjab.

== September 11, 1933 (Monday) ==
- Austria's Chancellor and dictator, Engelbert Dollfuss, proclaimed the Ständestaat in Vienna, a fascist nation with one political party, his own Fatherland Front.
- The radio soap opera Today's Children began a five-season run, starting on the NBC Blue Network, and finishing the last two seasons on the NBC Red Network.
- Ernest Rutherford, the "father of nuclear physics", said in an address to the British Association for the Advancement of Science that his experiments in the splitting of the atom showed that there was no future for what is now called nuclear energy. "The energy produced by the breaking down of the atom is a very poor kind of thing," he said. "Anyone who expects a source of power from the transformation of those atoms is talking moonshine." Energy from uranium fission would be discovered five years later, after Rutherford's death, and the first uranium reactor would be operating by 1942.
- Hitlerjunge Quex, the first major Nazi German motion picture, premiered in Munich at the Ufa-Phoebas-Palast theater, followed eight days later by its Berlin debut.
- Born: William Luther Pierce, American physics professor at Oregon State University, founder of the neo-Nazi National Alliance, and author (under the pseudonym "Andrew Macdonald") of the racist and anti-Semitic novel The Turner Diaries; in Atlanta (d. 2002)

== September 12, 1933 (Tuesday) ==
- Leó Szilárd, waiting for a red light on Southampton Row at Russell Square in Bloomsbury, conceived the idea of the nuclear chain reaction. Szilárd had read an account of Ernest Rutherford's comments, made the day before, that thoughts of nuclear energy were "moonshine". "As the light changed to green and I crossed the street," he would say later, "it suddenly occurred to me that if we could find an element which is split by neutrons and which would emit two neutrons when it absorbs one neutron, such an element, if assembled in sufficiently large mass, could sustain a nuclear chain reaction."
- Dr. Earle Haas was granted U.S. Patent No. 1,926,900 for his 1931 invention, a "catamenal device" with an applicator, which was marketed as the Tampax tampon.

== September 13, 1933 (Wednesday) ==
- Elizabeth Combs became the first woman to be elected to New Zealand's Parliament, to succeed her late husband.
- A crowd of almost 250,000 marchers paraded down New York City's Fifth Avenue with banners displaying the "Blue Eagle", to demonstrate their gratitude for the National Recovery Administration. The parade was organized by NRA Administrator Hugh S. Johnson, and required ten hours to complete as the quarter-million participants were given the half a day off by order of Mayor John P. O'Brien. TIME Magazine suggested that Johnson, a retired U.S. Army Brigadier General, raised his hand constantly in a "fascist salute", and one historian commented that the pro-government rally "was too reminiscent of mass rallies in fascist Italy and Nazi Germany".
- A 118-year-old ban against tobacco smoking was rescinded in Prussia, Germany's largest state. Previously, offenders could be fined for smoking, though the law was seldom enforced.
- Adolf Hitler announced the new Nazi program Winterhilfswerk, with Germans contributing money, clothing, fuel and shelter to help other Aryan Germans before winter arrived.
- Iranian Prime Minister Hedayat resigned without explanation.
- The fantasy drama film Berkeley Square starring Leslie Howard and Heather Angel premiered in New York.

== September 14, 1933 (Thursday) ==
- The British Resident Commissioner for the African protectorate of Bechuanaland (now the Republic of Botswana), Sir Charles Rey, sent in troops to the city of Serowe, to depose the Regent of the Bamangwato tribe, Chief Tshekedi. The Regent had violated a law prohibiting trial of any European national in native courts, after permitting a British citizen, Phineas McIntosh, to be flogged as punishment for adultery.
- Born:
  - Zoe Caldwell, Australian actress; in Melbourne (d. 2020)
  - Ingo Swann, American psychic; in Telluride, Colorado (d. 2013)
- Died: Irwin "Ike" H. Hoover, White House Chief Usher, employee since 1890, who had served ten U.S. Presidents, from Benjamin Harrison to Franklin D. Roosevelt. His memoir would be published by Houghton Mifflin in 1934 as Forty-Two Years in the White House

== September 15, 1933 (Friday) ==
- Edward "Spike" O'Donnell, a gangster "who once ranked almost equal to Al Capone" before falling on hard times, was acquitted by a jury of vagrancy charges.

== September 16, 1933 (Saturday) ==
- The Columbia News Service, forerunner of CBS News, was incorporated by the CBS Radio Network in order to gather its own news stories rather than relaying those from newspaper services.

== September 17, 1933 (Sunday) ==
- The new Reichsvertretung der Deutschen Juden (National Representation of German Jews) was created to encompass all of the Jewish organizations in Nazi Germany, with the Rabbi Leo Baeck as its President and Otto Hirsch as Director of its governing board. As persecution of Jews increased, the group would be forced to change its name in 1935 from Representation of German Jews to Representation of Jews in Germany, when Jews would no longer be classified as German citizens.
- The Chinese city of Shanhaikwan and the surrounding area was annexed to the Japanese puppet-state of Manchukuo. According to Japan's press agency, a delegation by Governor Puyi arrived "to find the population celebrating the move".
- The 1933 NFL season opened, with changes in the rules and three new teams, the Philadelphia Eagles, the Pittsburgh Pirates (later the Steelers), and the Cincinnati Reds. In the first games, the Boston (later Washington) Redskins tied the Green Bay Packers 7-7, and the Portsmouth Spartans (later the Detroit Lions) beat the football Reds 21-0.
- Born:
  - Chuck Grassley, U.S. Senator for Iowa since 1981, and President pro tempore of the United States Senate since 2025; in New Hartford, Iowa
  - David Kaplan, American philosopher and creator of the theory of two-dimensionalism and of the Logic2020 computer program; in Los Angeles

== September 18, 1933 (Monday) ==
- The bituminous coal operators of the United States agreed to come under the jurisdiction of the National Recovery Act, guaranteeing their employees a minimum wage of $4.60 a day and a 40-hour week.
- Born:
  - Robert Blake (stage name for Michael Gubitosi), American television actor; in Nutley, New Jersey (d. 2023)
  - Aklilu Lemma, Ethiopian physician; in Jijiga (d. 1997)
  - Bob Bennett, U.S. senator for Utah from 1993 to 2011; in Salt Lake City (d. 2016)
  - Fred Willard, American actor and comedian; in Cleveland (d. 2020)
- Died: Stephen Pichon, 76, Foreign Minister of France 1906-1911, 1913, and 1917-1920

== September 19, 1933 (Tuesday) ==
- The New York Giants clinched the National League pennant when the Pittsburgh Pirates were eliminated by losing the second game of a doubleheader to the Philadelphia Phillies 3-2.
- The film version of The Emperor Jones, starring Paul Robeson and an African-American cast, had its premiere, being shown at the Rivoli theater in Manhattan and the Roosevelt Theater in Harlem.
- Born:
  - David McCallum, Scottish-born American TV actor; in Glasgow (d. 2023)
  - Kurt Sanderling, German conductor; in Arys, Prussia (now Orzysz, Poland) (d. 2011)

== September 20, 1933 (Wednesday) ==
- The Rosh Hashanah holiday was celebrated by German Jews with "record-breaking attendance at German synagogues" in defiance of the Nazi government's wave of anti-Semitic decrees to mark the beginning of year 5694 on the Hebrew calendar.
- The team that would become the Pittsburgh Steelers played its first game. Known at the time as the Pirates, the team lost to the New York Giants, 23-2. The game was played on a Wednesday because Pennsylvania did not permit Sunday afternoon sports at the time.
- Died:
  - Annie Besant, 85, British Theosophical Society member and activist for Indian independence
  - William Walker, 73, African-American jockey who won the Kentucky Derby in 1877
  - Albrecht Höhler, 35, German Communist convicted of murdering Nazi Horst Wessel, summarily shot by the Gestapo while on a prison transport.

== September 21, 1933 (Thursday) ==
- Mabel Smith Douglass, who had founded the New Jersey College for Women (NJCW), disappeared after venturing out in a rowboat on Lake Placid, New York. Her capsized boat was found later, but Mrs. Douglass's body was not found until nearly 30 years later on September 15, 1963, when scuba divers located her remains on the bottom of the lake, "tied to an anchor with an estimated weight of 50 pounds". NJCW, now affiliated with Rutgers University, was renamed Douglass College in her honor in 1955.
- Marshal Mikhail Tukhachevsky, the Deputy People's Commissar for the Soviet Army and Navy, ordered the formation of the RNII (Reaktivnyy nauchno-issledovatel’skiy institut, literally the Reaction-Engine Scientific Research Institute) to begin the Soviet Union's development of missiles and space rockets.
- U.S. President Roosevelt ordered the immediate purchase of "surplus foodstuffs and staples for distribution to the nation's needy" at a total cost of $75,000,000 to provide food and clothing for 3.5 million American families.
- Egypt's Prime Minister Ismail Pasha Sidqi resigned.
- American aviator Wiley Post was seriously injured, and his famous airplane, the Winnie Mae, heavily damaged, in a crash on takeoff from the airport in Quincy, Illinois.
- The Washington Senators clinched the American League pennant by defeating the St. Louis Browns, 2 to 1.
- Born: Clifford Alexander, Jr., first African-American U.S. Secretary of the Army (1977-1981); in Harlem, New York City (d. 2022)
- Died: Kenji Miyazawa, 37, Japanese novelist and poet of children's literature, died of pneumonia. "Miyazawa, Kenji" in Modern Japanese Poets and the Nature of Literature, by Makoto Ueda (Stanford University Press, 1983) p. 184

== September 22, 1933 (Friday) ==
- The Reichskulturkammer (Reich Chamber of Culture) was created in Germany at the direction of Propaganda Minister Joseph Goebbels, who served as the Chamber's president. All "creators of culture" were required to register as members of one of the subdivisions of the organization, such as the Reich Film Chamber, the Reich Theatre Chamber, or those for literature, music, radio, the fine arts and even for the press, in order to continue to have the privilege of continuing their cultural work, and non-Aryans were excluded from membership.
- Bank robber John Dillinger was arrested at a boarding house at 324 West First Street in Dayton, Ohio. He would be transferred six days later from Dayton's jail to one in Lima, Ohio, where his gang would help him escape on October 12.

== September 23, 1933 (Saturday) ==
- The groundbreaking for Germany's Autobahn system of superhighways took place at Frankfurt, where Chancellor Adolf Hitler turned the first shovelful of earth, after telling 700 unemployed workers, "Before years have passed, this gigantic work will bear witness to our will, our industry, our ability, and our determination. German workers, to the work!" The first stretch of four-lane highway, from Frankfurt to Darmstadt (now Bundesautobahn 5 or A5) opened on May 13, 1935.
- Soviet dictator Joseph Stalin was on a boat trip on the Black Sea, at Sukhumi, when the craft came under rifle fire from the coast. What had first appeared to be an assassination attempt turned out to be a mistake made by guards from the local NKVD secret police, who thought that the unfamiliar boat was bringing foreign spies. The guards' pleas for mercy were accepted by Stalin at the time, with normal discipline measures for the hasty act; four years later, during the Great Purge, the men's convictions were reviewed and they were executed.
- Born: Richard Viguerie, American conservative activist and pioneer in using direct mail for political fundraising; in Pasadena, Texas

== September 24, 1933 (Sunday) ==
- German nuclear physics student Klaus Fuchs arrived in England, after having escaped arrest in Nazi Germany during a roundup of German Communist Party members. Despite his Communist background, Fuchs was later cleared for work on the top secret American atomic bomb program, and shared information so that the Soviet Union could develop its own nuclear weapons.
- Died:
  - Mike Donlin, 55, American baseball player and stage actor, died of a heart attack
  - Horace Liveright, 49, American publisher and stage producer, died of pneumonia

== September 25, 1933 (Monday) ==
- A hurricane destroyed the town of Tampico, Mexico, reportedly killing 5,000 people.
- Born: Ian Tyson, Canadian singer-songwriter; in Victoria, British Columbia (d. 2022)
- Died:
  - Ringgold "Ring" Lardner, 48, American humorist, died of a heart attack
  - Oscar Dufrenne, 58, French director of the Folies Bergère, was found dead of a fractured skull in his office at the Le Palace theater, the victim of murder
  - Arthur Seligman, 60, Governor of New Mexico since 1931
  - Paul Ehrenfest, 53, Austrian-born Dutch physicist, shot himself to death after killing his handicapped son.

== September 26, 1933 (Tuesday) ==
- Gangster George "Machine Gun" Kelly was captured in Memphis, Tennessee, along with his wife and two other partners in crime. According to FBI Director J. Edgar Hoover, Kelly shouted "Don't shoot, G-Men!", which was later explained as meaning "government men" for the federal officers, a nickname that would be picked up by the press for FBI agents. Kelly, convicted of the kidnapping of Oklahoma City businessman Charles Urschel, would spend the rest of his life in prison, dying on July 17, 1954.
- St. Zita (1212–1272) was designated by the Roman Catholic Church as the patron saint of maids and domestic servants.
- Charged with setting the Reichstag Fire, Marinus Van Der Lubbe confessed at his trial in Leipzig that he had set fire to the city hall, the former imperial palace and a welfare office in Berlin, but denied burning the Reichstag.
- Members of the future Dillinger gang escaped from Indiana State Prison. The escapees included Harry Pierpont, Charles Makley, Russell Clark and John Hamilton.

== September 27, 1933 (Wednesday) ==
- Ludwig Müller was elected as the first Reichsbischof of the Nazi-controlled German Evangelical Church, referred to as the Reichskirche. On the same day, the 2,000 assembled ministers voted to approve the Aryan paragraph for the church bylaws, expelling any Protestant minister who had a Jewish ancestor. Müller would serve as Reichsbischof until Germany's defeat in 1945, and would commit suicide on July 31 after realizing that he would be tried as a war criminal.
- Born: Lina Medina, Peruvian child who became the youngest mother in recorded history, giving birth in 1939; in Ticrapo
- Died:
  - Brigham H. Roberts, 76, American Mormon politician who was elected to Congress in 1898, but denied a seat because of his practice of polygamy
  - William Kennedy-Cochran-Patrick, 37, British flying ace in World War One, was killed in a plane crash in South Africa

== September 28, 1933 (Thursday) ==
- Gustav Lemoine of France set a new altitude record for an airplane, reaching 13,611 meters (44,819 feet) in a Potez 50.
- Born: Madeleine M. Kunin, Swiss-born American politician who served as the first female Governor of Vermont 1985-1991, and the first Jewish woman to govern any American state; in Zürich

== September 29, 1933 (Friday) ==
- The Reichserbhofgesetz, (State Law on Hereditary Farms) was decreed in Germany, requiring that mid-size family farms could not be inherited by any other person except for the youngest son, could not be divided among the family, and could not be owned by any non-Aryan people.
- Born:
  - Samora Machel, first President of Mozambique (1975–86), in Madragoa (now Chilembene) (killed 1986)
  - Mars Rafikov, Soviet cosmonaut dismissed from the program for discipline problems (d. 2000)
- Died: Ernest Holloway Oldham, 39, cipher clerk in British Foreign Office and spy for the Soviet Union, was found dead at his Kensington apartment in London from carbon monoxide poisoning caused by suicide or murder

== September 30, 1933 (Saturday) ==
- Dr. Francis Townsend first proposed the "Townsend Plan" to provide a government old-age pension of $150 per month for people over the age of 60, a precursor to the American social security plan. Dr. Townsend started with a letter published in the Press-Telegram of Long Beach, California.
- National Barn Dance premiered on nationwide radio on 30 clear channel stations of the NBC Red Network, after nine years as a local program in Chicago. It ended its run on ABC Radio in 1952.
- The musical revue As Thousands Cheer premiered on Broadway, introducing the new songs by Irving Berlin, including "Easter Parade" and "Heat Wave".
- A crew of three Soviet aeronauts; Georgy Prokofiev, Ernest Birnbaum, and C.D. Godunov; set a new altitude record of 60,695 feet in the balloon USSR.
- Born: János Flesch, Hungarian-born chess grandmaster; in Budapest (killed in auto accident, 1983)
