= October 1933 =

Month of 1933

<<	October 1933					>>
Su	Mo	Tu	We	Th	Fr	Sa
1	2	3	4	5	6	7
8	9	10	11	12	13	14
15	16	17	18	19	20	21
22	23	24	25	26	27	28
29	30	31

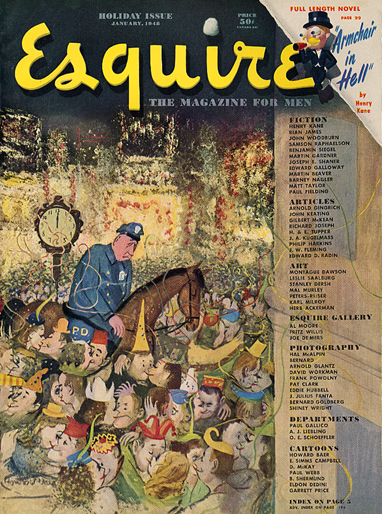
October 16, 1933: Esquire, "the magazine for men", debuts

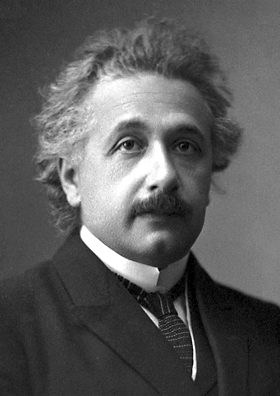
October 17, 1933: Albert Einstein moves to the United States

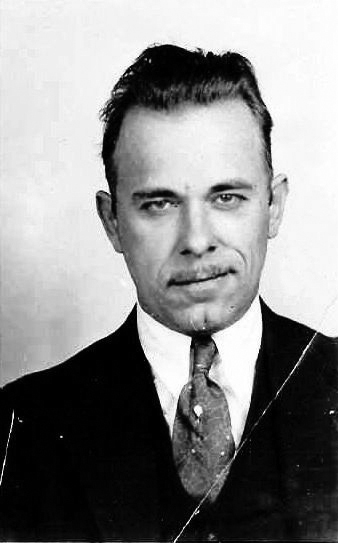
October 12, 1933: John Dillinger's gang breaks him out of jail

The following events occurred in October 1933:

== October 1, 1933 (Sunday) ==
- Thirty-three people were killed in the capsizing of the Japanese sightseeing boat Koun Maru off of the coast of the Kumamoto Prefecture.
- At the recommendation of the Nazi government, all patriotic Germans were expected to set aside the first Sunday of each month as an Eintopfsonntag (literally, a "one-pot Sunday"), with families to have a simple meal rather than a more expensive Sunday meal, and to contribute the difference to the Winterhilfswerk fund.
- Died: Te Rata Mahuta, 56, King of the Māori people in New Zealand since 1912

== October 2, 1933 (Monday) ==
- The Eugene O'Neill play Ah, Wilderness! was performed for the first time. O'Neill's only comedy, the play has "proved to be enduring and revivable especially in university and community theaters".
- Born: John Bertrand Gurdon; British biologist, in Dippenhall, Hampshire

== October 3, 1933 (Tuesday) ==
- A failed assassination attempt against Engelbert Dollfuss seriously injured him.
- A fire in Griffith Park in Los Angeles trapped more than 50 people employed by a Los Angeles County relief project.
- Cuban President Ramón Grau narrowly escaped assassination.
- Died:
  - Abdolhossein Teymourtash, 50, recently jailed Court Minister of Iran, died from a lethal injection while imprisoned.
  - Young Stribling, 30, American heavyweight boxer, died two days after being fatally injured in an auto accident.

== October 4, 1933 (Wednesday) ==
- The Schriftleitergesetz (Editorial Control Law) took effect in Germany, placing the press under the control of the government. All newspaper and magazine editors had to be members of the new "Reich League of the German Press", which banned non-Aryans as well as people married to non-Aryans.

== October 5, 1933 (Thursday) ==
- A group of 1,000 delegates to the annual British Labour Party congress in Hastings opened their session with a moment of silence in memory of fellow workers in Germany who had lost their lives to Nazi oppression. The conference then unanimously passed two resolutions, one condemning Fascism and the other pledging to boycott goods manufactured in Germany as well as calling upon the League of Nations to protect Jews and other racial minorities in Germany.
- Born: Billy Lee Riley, American country musician; in Pocahontas, Arkansas (d. 2009)
- Died:
  - Nikolai Yudenich, 71, former Russian general who led the Menshevik "White Army" against the Bolsheviks in the Russian Civil War
  - Renée Adorée (Jeanne de la Fonte), 35, French film actress, died of tuberculosis
  - Harry G. Cooper, 69, a/k/a "Railroad Jack", college graduate turned hobo.

== October 6, 1933 (Friday) ==
- UK Lord President of the Council Stanley Baldwin made a key speech on the subject of disarmament to a meeting of the Conservative Party in Birmingham. Baldwin spoke of the need for a disarmament convention, explaining, "I mean a limitation of armaments, a real limitation, such a one that if we, by the many gestures we have made of disarmament, find ourselves on some lower rating than the figures in such a convention, and some other country has higher figures, that country has to come down and we go up until we meet. No other form of convention would be negotiated by the Government; no other form of convention is in contemplation ... I would only add this: If that convention be signed, the nation that breaks it will have no friend in this civilised world."
- The Prussian Ministry of Justice issued a memorandum advocating euthanasia for persons afflicted with incurable diseases, under three conditions: the afflicted person demand that his misery be ended, two official doctors must certify that the person have an incurable ailment, and that a qualified physician administer the fatal drug.
- The musical romantic comedy film I'm No Angel starring Mae West was released.
- Died: Wallace Rider Farrington, 62, Territorial Governor of Hawaii from 1921 to 1929

== October 7, 1933 (Saturday) ==
- Air France was formed by the merger of five French airline companies – Air Orient, Air Union, Compagnie Générale Aéropostale, Compagnie Internationale de Navigation Aérienne (CIDNA) and Société Générale des Transports Aériens (SGTA) – beginning operations with 250 planes.
- The New York Giants won the 1933 World Series. Victory came in the fifth game, which went into extra innings before the Giants beat the Washington Senators, 4-3

== October 8, 1933 (Sunday) ==
- Diego Martínez Barrio became the new Prime Minister of Spain after being appointed by President Niceto Alcalá-Zamora.
- Korokī Mahuta was crowned as the fifth King of the Māori people in New Zealand, seven days after the death of his father, Te Rata Mahuta. He would be recognized by the New Zealand government as the chief spokesman for the nation's Māori population until his death on May 23, 1966.
- Born: James A. Corbett, American human rights activist and co-founder of the Sanctuary Movement in 1980; in Casper, Wyoming (d. 2001)

== October 9, 1933 (Monday) ==
- Spanish President Zamora dissolved the Cortes Generales and called new elections for November 19.
- Born:
  - Peter Mansfield, British physicist, and 2003 recipient of the Nobel Prize for his development of magnetic resonance imaging (MRI); in Lambeth, County of London (d. 2017)
  - Joan Berger, American female professional baseball player and AAGPBL Rookie of the Year in 1952; in Passaic, New Jersey (d. 2021)
- Died: Gus Winkler, 32, American gangster for Al Capone and Frank Nitti, was shot to death on Nitti's orders after being seen visiting an FBI office

== October 10, 1933 (Tuesday) ==
- All four passengers and three crew were killed by the bombing of a United Airlines Boeing 247 in the first proven case of air sabotage in commercial airline history. The plane was flying from Cleveland to Chicago and was at 1,000 feet altitude in a rainstorm when it exploded in flames near Chesterton, Indiana. Investigators would conclude that the blast had been caused by a timer and nitroglycerine that had been hidden in a package put on the plane during an earlier stop at Newark, New Jersey and the perpetrator would never be identified.
- The "Anti-war Treaty of Non-aggression and Conciliation", commonly called the "Saavedra Lamas Pact" because it was written by Argentina's foreign minister, Carlos Saavedra Lamas, was signed in Rio de Janeiro by Argentina, Brazil, Chile, Mexico, Paraguay and Uruguay. Eventually it would be signed by eleven European nations as well.
- Born: Jay Sebring, American celebrity hairstylist; as Thomas John Kummer in Birmingham, Alabama (murdered by the Manson Family, 1969)

== October 11, 1933 (Wednesday) ==
- The United States, United Kingdom and France agreed at Geneva that Germany's request for expansion of defensive armament should not be granted.
- The "International Convention for the Suppression of the Traffic in Women of Full Age" was signed in Geneva. It would enter into force on August 24, 1934 and be superseded by another convention on March 21, 1950.

== October 12, 1933 (Thursday) ==
- Three members of John Dillinger's gang— Harry Pierpont, Russell Clark and Charles Makley— invaded the city jail in Lima, Ohio and freed him, killing Sheriff Jesse Sarber in the process.
- U.S. Attorney General Homer Cummings announced that the Department of Justice would acquire the U.S. Army Disciplinary Barracks on California's Alcatraz Island, for the construction of the most secure federal penitentiary up to that time. Cummings told reporters, "Here may be isolated the criminals of the vicious and irredeemable type, so that their evil influence may not be extended to other prisoners who are disposed to rehabilitate themselves." Transfer took place the next day. The first inmates would arrive at Alcatraz Island in 1934.

== October 13, 1933 (Friday) ==
- Thirty workers were killed in the explosion of a fireworks factory at Visakhapatnam in India.
- President Roosevelt gave the FBI principal jurisdiction over the Lindbergh kidnapping case, 19 months after the March 1, 1932 disappearance of Charles Lindbergh Jr.
- The romantic comedy-drama film Bombshell starring Jean Harlow and Lee Tracy was released.

== October 14, 1933 (Saturday) ==
- Germany announced that it would withdraw from the League of Nations, after the three Allied Powers of World War I (France, the U.K. and the U.S.) denied its request to increase its military.

== October 15, 1933 (Sunday) ==
- Esquire, which billed itself as "the magazine for men", published its first issue, with 100,000 copies that sold out quickly, despite the high cover price of fifty cents.
- The cornerstone for the future Haus der Deutschen Kunst (literally the "House of German Art"), was laid in Munich by Adolf Hitler on a special "German Art Day". Hitler's aide Albert Speer would later recount that the building's architect Paul Troost, had designed a ceremonial silver hammer for the event, but that the hammer broke while Hitler was using it. Troost would die four months later, and Hitler would tell Speer, "When that hammer shattered I knew at once it was an evil omen. Something is going to happen, I thought. Now we know why the hammer broke. The architect was destined to die."
- The Philadelphia Eagles played their first regular season NFL game, more than a month after the other teams had begun play, losing to the Giants at New York, 56-0.
- Died: Nitobe Inazō, 71, Japanese diplomat and Christian

== October 16, 1933 (Monday) ==
- In parliamentary elections for Norway's Storting, the Arbeiderpartiet gained 22 seats to win a plurality (69 of 150 seats) but was still six short of a majority.
- The Commodity Credit Corporation was established in the U.S. by Executive Order 6340 in order to make loans to farmers in return for their delivery of their crops to a warehouse or grain elevator for use as collateral.
- Union County Junior College, the first community college in New Jersey, began classes.

== October 17, 1933 (Tuesday) ==
- Albert Einstein arrived in the United States, on board the ocean liner Westmoreland as a refugee from Nazi Germany, and took up a position at the Institute for Advanced Study, Princeton, New Jersey.
- The weekly newspaper Negro World, which had been founded 15 years earlier by Marcus Garvey and the Universal Negro Improvement Association, ceased publication.
- Born:
  - Jeanine Deckers, Belgian nun and singer, who attained fame in 1963 as Soeur Sourire, "The Singing Nun", for her #1 hit, "Dominique"; in Brussels (d. 1985)
  - William Anders, American astronaut on Apollo 8 and one of the first three men to orbit the Moon; in Hong Kong. (d. 2024)

== October 18, 1933 (Wednesday) ==
- The Grumman F2F fighter airplane was given its first flight, piloted by Jimmy Collins.
- The last lynching in Maryland took place in the town of Princess Anne. George Armwood had been arrested two days earlier and charged with the rape of an 81-year-old woman. A mob of more than 1,000 people surrounded the Somerset County Jail, dragged him through the streets, hanged him, then brought the body back to the courthouse where it was hung from a telephone pole and burned.

== October 19, 1933 (Thursday) ==
- William C. Bullitt and Henry Morgenthau Jr. were sent by U.S. President Roosevelt to speak informally with Soviet trade representative Boris Skvirskii about the prospect of establishing diplomatic relations between the U.S. and the U.S.S.R.
- La Societe Besnier, a predecessor of Lactalis, a dairy product brand based in France and Europe, was founded.
- Died: Moses Orimolade, 55, Nigerian Yoruban religious leader who founded the Order of the Cherubim and Seraphim.

== October 20, 1933 (Friday) ==
- A storm on Japan's Oguri Island left 379 fishermen missing.
- Born: William Eteki Mboumoua, Cameroonian diplomat who was the Secretary-General of the Organization of African Unity (OAU) from 1974 to 1978; in Douala (d. 2016)

== October 21, 1933 (Saturday) ==
- Jaan Tõnisson resigned his leadership as the Riigivanem (State Elder) of Estonia, and was succeeded by Konstantin Päts.
- Let 'Em Eat Cake, a musical by George and Ira Gershwin that was a sequel to the successful Of Thee I Sing, premiered on Broadway, and proved to be a failure, running 89 performances.

== October 22, 1933 (Sunday) ==
- Voters in Iceland overwhelmingly approved the repeal of a 1915 law that had prohibited the sale of alcohol. In 1922, the law had been modified to grant an exception to wines imported from Spain.

== October 23, 1933 (Monday) ==
- In his first bank robbery since escaping from jail and then raiding police stations for guns and bulletproof vests, John Dillinger and his gang robbed the Central National Bank in Greencastle, Indiana, taking $75,000. On the same day, Baby Face Nelson and his gang robbed the First National Bank of Brainerd, Minnesota, of $32,000.

== October 24, 1933 (Tuesday) ==
- Édouard Daladier resigned as Prime Minister of France after the Socialist deputies in Parliament failed to support his plans for increased taxes and decreased government spending. After both Albert Sarraut and Camille Chautemps served for one month and two months respectively, Daladier became Prime Minister again on January 29, 1934.
- Thirty people were killed in France, and 32 injured, when the Cherbourg to Paris express derailed while rounding a sharp curve near Évreux and sent three passenger cars into the Rouloir River.
- Born:
  - Reginald Kray (d. 2000) and Ronald Kray (d. 1995), English gangsters known as the Kray Twins, in Hoxton, County of London
  - Norman Rush, American novelist, in Oakland, California
- Died: Lucy Craft Laney, 79, African-American educator

== October 25, 1933 (Wednesday) ==
- U.S. President Roosevelt reversed economic policy and began a program of buying gold at higher than the existing rate of $20.67 per ounce.
- What one author has described as "radio's first romantic adventure", Dangerous Paradise premiered on the NBC Blue Network (later renamed the ABC Radio Network).

== October 26, 1933 (Thursday) ==
- After the Dillinger gang continued its string of robberies in Indiana, Governor Paul V. McNutt took the unusual response of calling out the Indiana National Guard to stop the criminals. The gang then fled to Chicago.

== October 27, 1933 (Friday) ==
- Charles Edward Washington, scheduled to be put to death in the electric chair in the District of Columbia jail, was given a two-day reprieve while awaiting death for the murder of a D.C. policeman. His partner, William Robinson, was already in the chair when the call from President Roosevelt came, and was executed as scheduled. After the two days expired, Washington was 2 hours and 20 minutes away from another execution on October 30, when he received another reprieve.
- Grady Brooks was executed in Milledgeville, Georgia, for the murder of prison guard Lee Lindsay. Before going to the electric chair, the 19-year-old African-American confessed to 18 other murders, five of them when he was a 13-year-old child.
- Miss Grace Fryer became the 18th employee of an Orange, New Jersey, watch factory to die of radium poisoning. Miss Fryer had developed the disease almost twenty years earlier, and had painted watch faces with radium so that they would glow. As with the other workers, she moistened the paint brushes with her lips and ingested the carcinogenic element.
- Died: Ramon Casanelles, Spanish anarchist who assassinated Prime Minister Dato, was killed in a motorcycle accident.

== October 28, 1933 (Saturday) ==
- Stadio Mussolini was formally dedicated in Turin during events marking the 11th anniversary of the March on Rome. The venue was renamed after World War II and is known today as Stadio Olimpico di Torino.
- Died: E. H. Sothern, 72, American stage actor who was half of the team, with his wife Julia Marlowe, of "Sothern and Marlowe"

== October 29, 1933 (Sunday) ==
- In U.S. the Amalgamated Broadcasting System, a radio network founded by Ed Wynn in September to compete against NBC, CBS and Mutual, broadcast its final program and then went off of the air permanently.
- Died: Paul Painlevé, 69, French mathematician who served as caretaker Prime Minister of France during the years 1917 and 1925

== October 30, 1933 (Monday) ==
- The Falange Española, a Spanish fascist political party, was founded by José Antonio Primo de Rivera with an organizational meeting at the Teatro de la Comedia in Madrid. After the success of the Phalangists in the Spanish Civil War, Primo de Rivera's successor, Francisco Franco, would rule Spain for almost 40 years.
- The Romance of Helen Trent premiered on the CBS Radio Network and began a run of almost 27 years and 7,222 episodes. The daytime soap opera would continue until June 24, 1960.
- Born: Wallace D. Muhammad, Black Muslim leader who changed church policy after succeeding his father, Elijah Muhammad; in Hamtramck, Michigan (d. 2008)

== October 31, 1933 (Tuesday) ==
- Samuel Insull, former utilities magnate who had fled the United States to avoid charges of swindling investors, was successful in avoiding extradition from Greece.
