= August 1933 =

Month of 1933

<<	August 1933					>>
Su	Mo	Tu	We	Th	Fr	Sa
		1	2	3	4	5
6	7	8	9	10	11	12
13	14	15	16	17	18	19
20	21	22	23	24	25	26
27	28	29	30	31

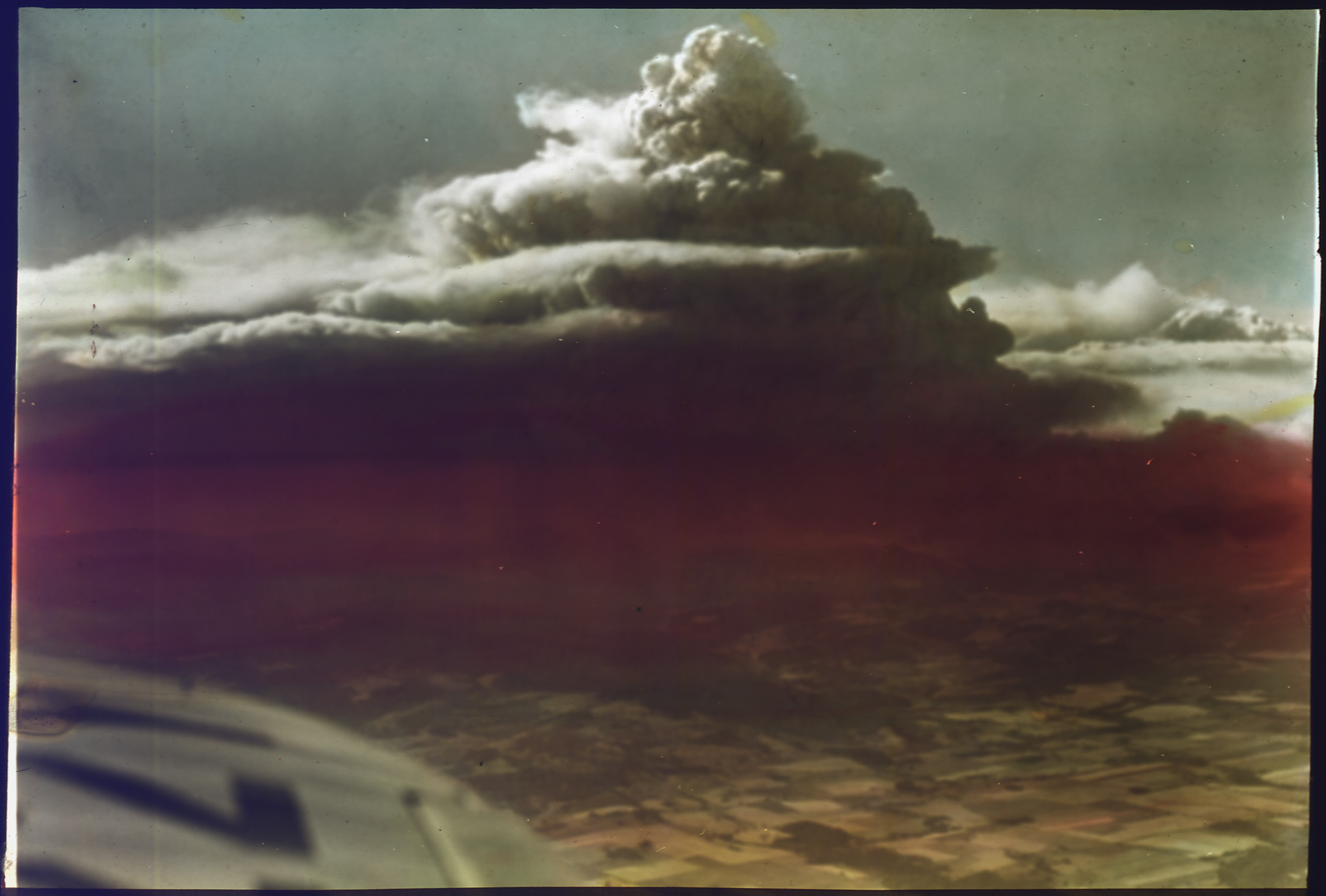
August 14, 1933: Oregon loggers accidentally start forest fire, nearly 500 square miles burned

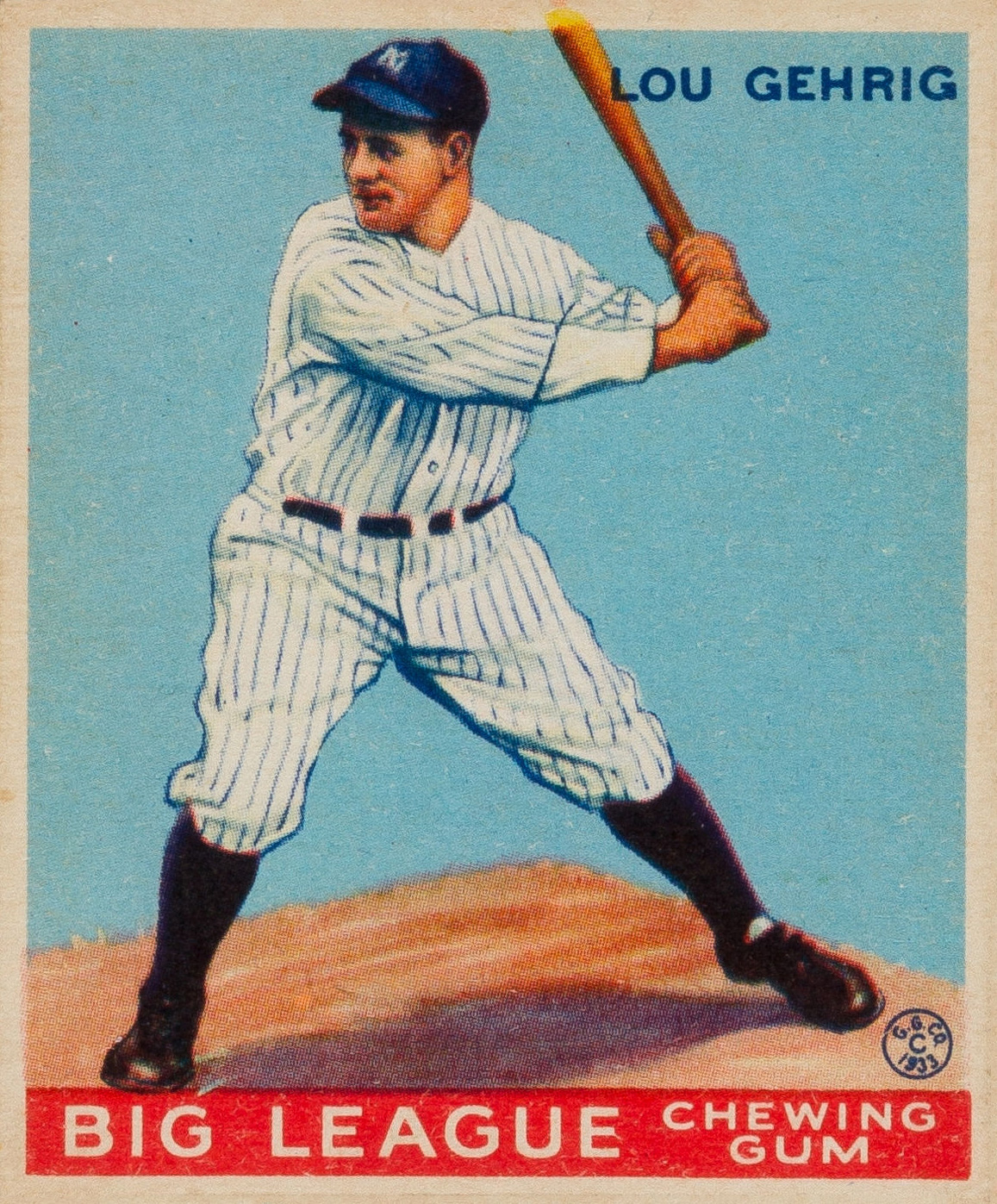
August 17, 1933: Gehrig breaks consecutive game record

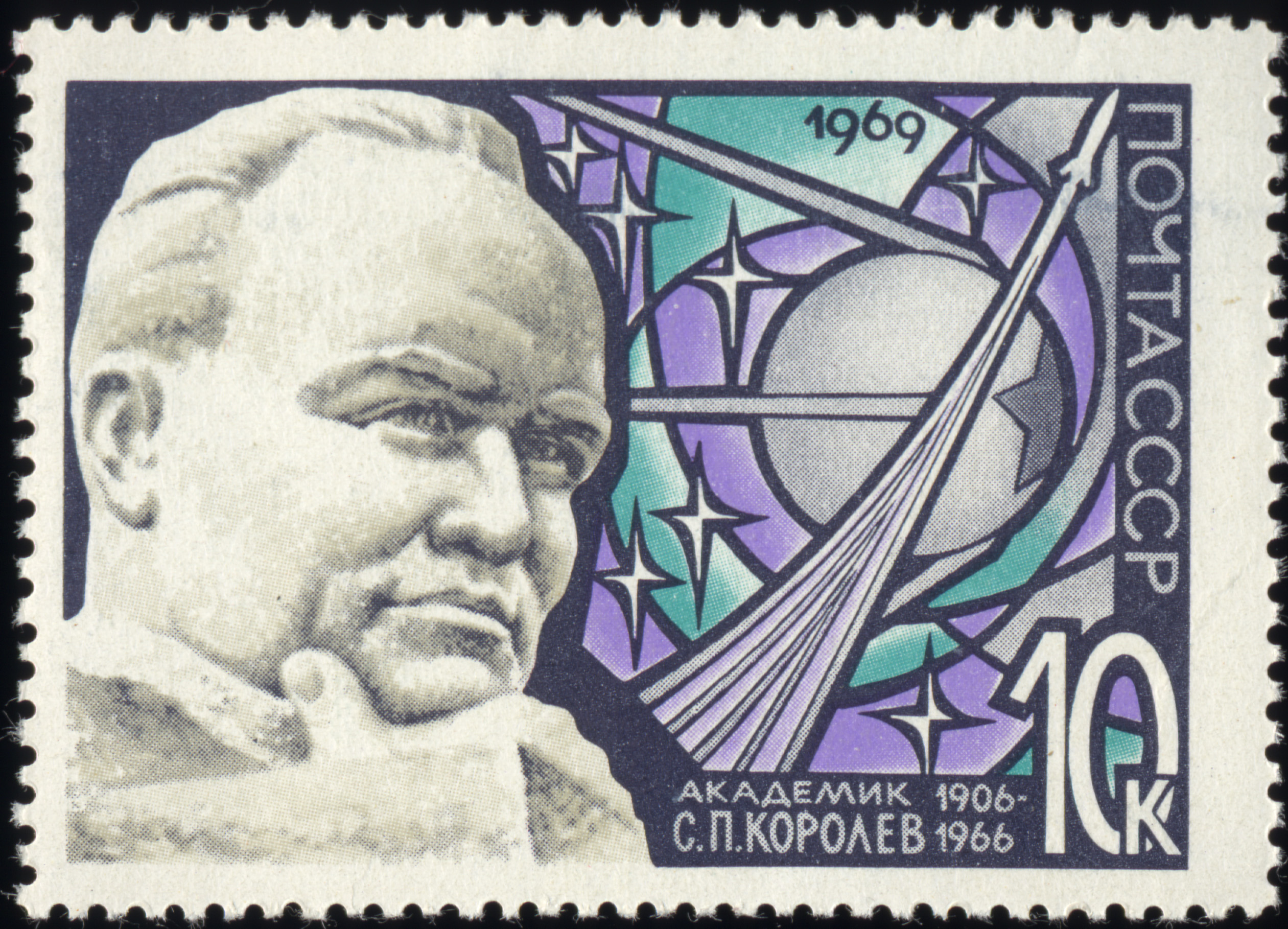
August 17, 1933: Korolev begins Soviet rocket program

The following events occurred in August 1933:

== August 1, 1933 (Tuesday) ==
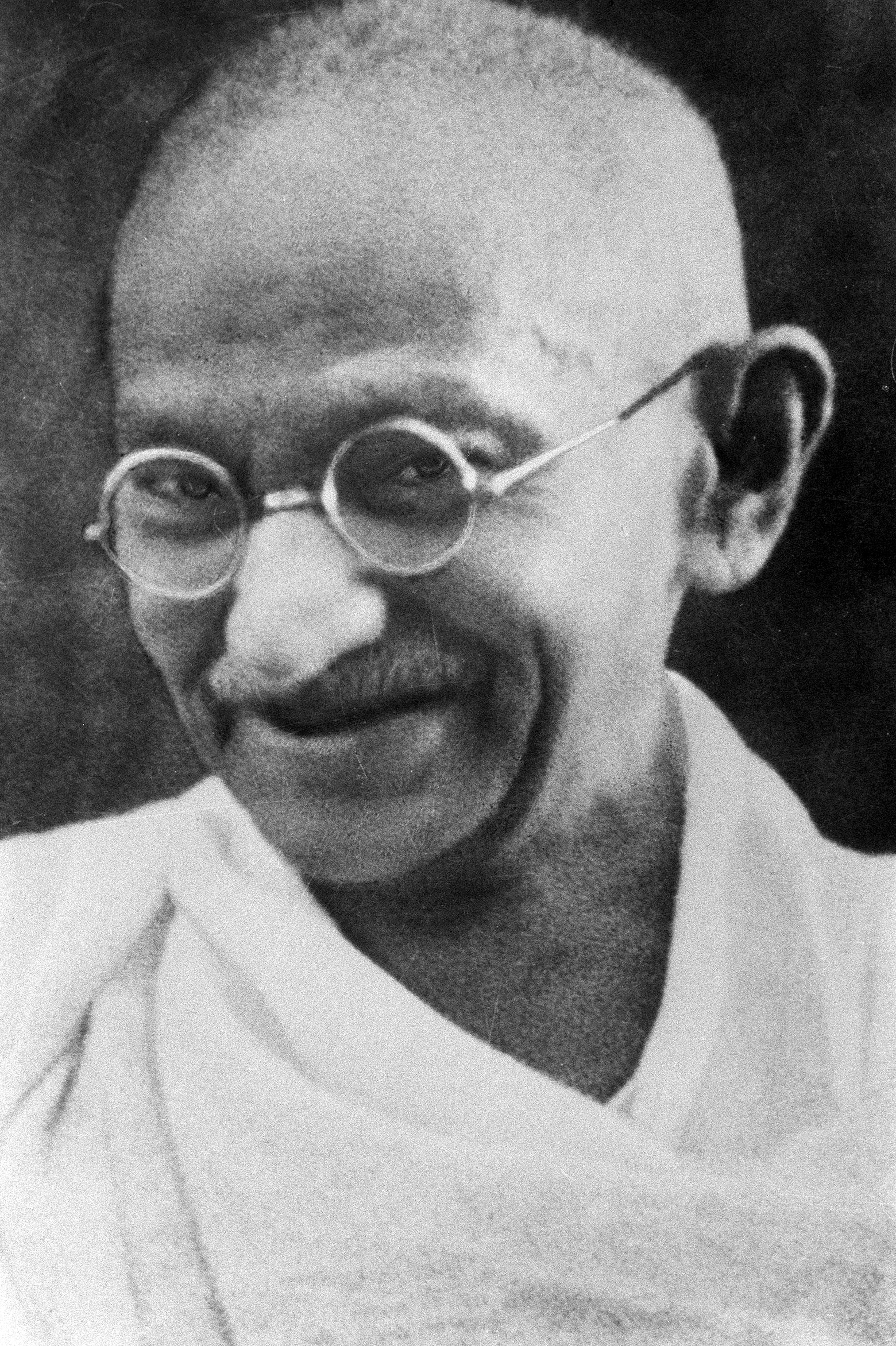
Gandhi arrested

Sukarno arrested

- The Blue Eagle emblem of the National Recovery Administration was displayed publicly for the first time as the National Recovery Act went into effect.
- Mohandas K. Gandhi, leader of the peaceful independence movement against the British administrators of India, was arrested the day after calling for individuals to boycott liquor and foreign cloth. He was taken to Sabarmati Jail and then transferred to Yervada Jail in Poona. He would be released on August 23 after beginning a hunger strike.
- Sukarno, leader of the independence movement against the Netherlands administrators of Indonesia (at the time, the Dutch East Indies), was re-arrested after 19 months out of prison, and sent back to the Sukamiskin Penitentiary at Bandung.
- Istanbul University was opened, with only 35 percent of the faculty who had worked at the Darulfunun the day before. Most of the new department heads were German-speaking professors.
- Germany conducted its first executions of Communists, sending Bruno Tesch, Walter Möller, Karl Wolff and August Lütgens to the guillotine at Hamburg.
- The Caledon Bay crisis began in Australia's Northern Territory, when police constable Albert McColl was killed by a spear. McColl was on Woodah Island, investigating the killings of five Japanese fishermen and two white beachcombers by the aboriginal Yolngu people, who had accused the victims of raping Yolngu women. McColl's murder, apparently by a Yolngu named Tuckiar for the rape of Tuckiar's wife, led to fears among the white residents of the NT of an aboriginal uprising. Five of the Yolngu, including Tuckiar, turned themselves in and went to trial. Public outcry over the racist attitude of the judge, led in November 1934 to Tuckiar's release. Tuckiar vanished the day after leaving jail.
- Born:
  - Dom DeLuise, American actor and comedian; in Brooklyn (died 2009)
  - Ko Un, South Korean poet; in Gunsan
  - Meena Kumari, actress and poet, in Bombay, British India (died 1972)

== August 2, 1933 (Wednesday) ==
- The Soviet White Sea Baltic Canal, a 141-mile (227 km) waterway, officially opened. Constructed using forced labor, it connected the White Sea with the Baltic Sea by way of Lake Onega. Joseph Stalin was present at the dedication, and Soviet newspapers printed edicts from the Central Committee of the Communist Party, listing those canal workers "who had received commendations and reduced or commuted sentences". Once completed, however, the Canal "was never of much use".
- New prison regulations were introduced in Germany's largest state, Prussia, and would become the rule nationwide on May 14, 1934. Among the changes were the punishment of four weeks of verschärfter Arrest ("aggravated detention") in which bad behavior meant four weeks in a cell with no bed, no chance of exercise, and a diet that was, literally, bread and water. Hans Kerrl, at the time the Prussian Minister of Justice, told the press that the tougher rules were designed "to awaken the unqualified desire in the prisoner never to return into such a house".

== August 3, 1933 (Thursday) ==
- The collapse of the Castlewood Dam on Colorado's Cherry Creek, sent a 20 foot high wall of water through Denver, Colorado, as well as the towns of Parker and Sullivan. There was an hour warning before the 6:15 deluge, and only two people were killed, while another 5,000 were evacuated.
- For the first time in thirty years, the "Great White Spot" appeared on the planet Saturn. Amateur astronomer and actor Will Hay became the first person on Earth to see the event, which lasted for four weeks and allowed an accurate measure of Saturn's rotational period of 10 hours and 13 minutes.
- The New York Yankees streak of consecutive games without a shutout ended with a 7–0 loss to the Philadelphia Athletics and pitcher Lefty Grove. The Yankees had scored at least one run in every game since August 2, 1931 when the Yankees beat the Red Sox 9–8. The record of 308 games still stands, with the second longest streak being 212 by the Milwaukee Brewers from 1978 to 1979.
- Died: Arthur Collins, 69, American recording artist, most famous for his 1899 phonographic record "Hello! Ma Baby"

== August 4, 1933 (Friday) ==
- A tear gas attack, on the trading floor of the New York Stock Exchange, sent hundreds of brokers scattering and forced the suspension of trading. The sudden closing was the first since September 16, 1920, when 30 people were killed by a bomb at the Exchange.

== August 5, 1933 (Saturday) ==
- The day after a clash between soldiers at the border between Iraq and Syria, Iraqi General Bakr Sidqi ordered the Simele massacre of men of the Assyrian minority.
- The National Labor Board was created by order of U.S. President Franklin D. Roosevelt to handle labor disputes arising under the National Industrial Recovery Act. The NLB was ineffective and would be dissolved on July 9, 1934, and later replaced by the National Labor Relations Board.
- American dancer Sally Rand, famous for her "fan dance", was arrested by Chicago police detective Dennis H. Parkerson, who said that, during the performance, "Miss Rand's entire body from her head to her foot was revealed nude... with the exception of sandals."
- Died: Fred Beell, 57, German-American professional wrestler and police officer, was shot and killed in the line of duty.

== August 6, 1933 (Sunday) ==
- Samuel Untermyer, a New York City lawyer, launched his campaign on behalf of the "World Jewish Economic Federation", announced a worldwide boycott of German exports and services, to "undermine the Hitler regime and bring the German people to their senses, by destroying their export trade on which their very existence depends."

== August 7, 1933 (Monday) ==
- In the Simele massacre, more than 3,000 Assyrian Iraqis were killed by Iraq government troops in the Dohuk (Syriac ܢܘܗܕܪܐ) and Mosul (Syriac ܢܝܢܘܐ) districts.
- Police in Havana killed 21 people and wounded another 150 after Cuba's President Gerardo Machado ordered law enforcement to disperse crowds.
- French flyers Paul Codos and Maurice Rossi set a new record for the furthest non-stop trip in an airplane, landing in Rayak, in Lebanon (at that time, part of Syria), having gone 5,700 miles in the 59 hours since they had taken off from New York City on at 2:00 am three days earlier. Bound for Iran, the men would have traveled even further, but a gasoline leak caused them to end the flight early.
- Died:
  - Park Kyung-won, 32, first female Korean pilot, in a plane crash
  - Felix Fechenbach, 39, German Jewish journalist, killed by the Nazi SS.

== August 8, 1933 (Tuesday) ==
- The First Federal Savings and Loan Association of Miami, founded by William Walker Jr., received the first charter ever issued under the 1932 Federal Home Loan Bank Act, thus making it the first "S & L" in the United States. The institution later renamed itself AmeriFirst, and on its fiftieth anniversary in 1983, announced that it was ridding itself of the charter so that it could become a bank.
- U.S. envoy Sumner Welles arrived in Havana to offer President Machado safe passage out of the country if he would resign his office.
- Born: Joe Tex (Joseph Arrington Jr.), African-American soul singer; in Baytown, Texas (died 1982)

== August 9, 1933 (Wednesday) ==
- President Machado of Cuba decreed that "a state of war" existed throughout the island nation, and ordered troops to report to Havana to defend the capital city. Machado had been granted dictatorial power two days earlier by a vote of the Cuban congress.
- Born: Yoshinobu Oyakawa, Japanese-American swimmer and 1952 Olympic gold medalist; in Kona, Hawaii

== August 10, 1933 (Thursday) ==
- Midget car racing was inaugurated with the first professional race of the small cars with large engines, taking place at the stadium of Loyola High School in Los Angeles.
- All U.S. national monuments (including the White House), national cemeteries, and historical battlefields were placed under the jurisdiction of the National Park Service of the United States Department of the Interior.
- Born: Doyle Brunson, American poker player, winner of World Series of Poker in 1976 and 1977; in Longworth, Texas (died 2023)

== August 11, 1933 (Friday) ==
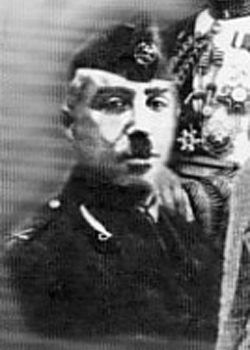
General Bakr Sidqi

- The Simele massacre was carried out by the Iraqi Army against the unarmed Assyrian Christians living in the town of Simele, on orders of General Bakr Sidqi. The unarmed men of the town, including teenaged boys, were sought out and shot by soldiers with machine guns. According to the army report later, the bodies of 305 men, 4 women and 6 children were disposed of the next day. General Sidqi was celebrated as a national hero after his return to Baghdad.
- Born:
  - Jerry Falwell, American evangelist and conservative political activist; in Lynchburg, Virginia (died 2007)
  - Jerzy Grotowski, Polish innovator in experimental theater; in Rzeszów (died 1999)

== August 12, 1933 (Saturday) ==
- Winston Churchill made his first public warning of the dangers of German rearmament.

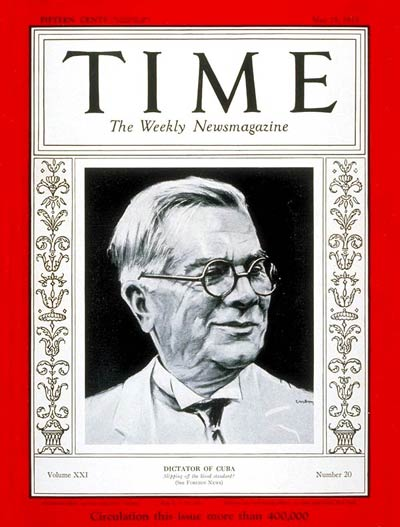
Machado

- Gerardo Machado, the dictator of Cuba, fled from Havana by airplane with three aides, as mobs raged through the city. He was replaced by former Ambassador to the U.S. Carlos Manuel de Céspedes. Hours earlier, a mob had broken into the presidential palace and sacked it.
- Dr. Orestes Ferrara, former State Secretary of Cuba, was able to fly to safety on a Pan American seaplane, with machine guns being fired at him.
- Born: Parnelli Jones, American racecar driver, winner of 1963 Indianapolis 500; in Texarkana, Arkansas (d. 2024)

== August 13, 1933 (Sunday) ==
- Professional golfer Gene Sarazen won the PGA Championship, played at Wauwatosa, Wisconsin, near Milwaukee, days after his rival Tommy Armour described Sarazen and other players as "washed up", with no future.
- Two U.S. Navy ships were ordered to sail to Cuba to protect American life and property in the aftermath of the revolution there. The destroyer USS Claxton sailed the next day, and the USS Taylor the day afterward.
- Born: Joycelyn Elders, Surgeon General of the United States 1993 to 1994; as Minnie Lee Jones in Schaal, Arkansas

== August 14, 1933 (Monday) ==
- Loggers at the Gales Creek Logging Company accidentally caused the "Tillamook Burn", a forest fire in the Oregon Coast Range. The blaze would not be extinguished until days of heavy rain caused it to be doused on September 5. In all, the fire destroyed 311,000 acres (486 mi^{2}) of woodlands.
- The afternoon radio show Ma Perkins, starring Virginia Payne was introduced. Originally broadcast on station WLW in Cincinnati, the show was picked up nationwide on December 4 on the NBC Red Network, running weekday afternoons from 1933 to 1942, on both NBC and CBS simultaneously from 1942 to 1949, and on CBS radio from 1949 to 1960.
- Born: Richard R. Ernst, Swiss chemist, 1991 Nobel Prize in Chemistry laureate; in Winterthur (d. 2021)

== August 15, 1933 (Tuesday) ==
- Five relatives of former German Chancellor Philipp Scheidemann, arrested a month earlier in retaliation for an anti-Nazi article that Scheidemann had written while in exile, were released from detention in a concentration camp, but not without the personal intervention of President Paul von Hindenburg and the five persons' declaration of "deep abhorrence of their kinsman's treasonable conduct". The government announcement of their release added that "Attention is called in this connection to the fact that in the future, further relentless measures will be taken if fugitive Marxists should attempt to propagandize Germany.
- Born:
  - Jim Lange, American disc jockey and game show host known for The Dating Game; in Saint Paul, Minnesota (died 2014)
  - Bobby Helms, American singer best known for his 1957 song Jingle Bell Rock; in Bloomington, Indiana (died 1997)
  - Mike Seeger, American folk musician; in New York City (died 2009)
  - Stanley Milgram, American psychologist known for the 1962 Milgram Experiment; in New York City (died 1984)

== August 16, 1933 (Wednesday) ==
- The Christie Pits riot, worst in the history of Toronto, broke out. Two days earlier, a gang called the Swastika Club had displayed a quilt with a large swastika during a softball tournament at Willowvale Park. During Wednesday's game between the Harbord, a Jewish team, and St. Peter's, four members of the gang displayed the emblem a second time, and a crowd of 100 infuriated Jewish youths chased after them, and soon the crowd of participants rose to 10,000. The violence lasted six hours. Remarkably, nobody was killed.
- Barred by prison officials from being allowed to contribute to his publication of Harijan, Mohandas K. Gandhi began a "fast up to death". The British Indian government, worried about the consequences of the freedom fighter's death in prison, released him unconditionally the following week.
- The drama film The Power and the Glory starring Spencer Tracy and Colleen Moore was released.
- Born:
  - Julie Newmar, American actress (Batman); as Julia Newmeyer in Los Angeles
  - Stuart Roosa, American astronaut on Apollo 14; in Durango, Colorado (died 1994)

== August 17, 1933 (Thursday) ==
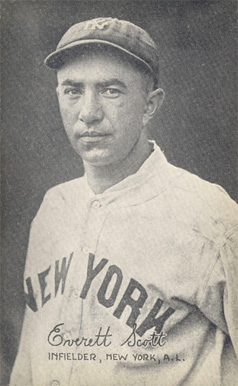
Everett Scott, who played 1,307 MLB games

- The GIRD 09, first Soviet rocket to be propelled by a rocket engine with a liquid propellant, was successfully launched for the first time after two failures. Designed by Sergei Korolev and sponsored by the Group for the Study of Reactive Motion (GRuppa Izucheniya Reaktivnogo Dvizheniya or GIRD), the rocket reached an altitude of either 40 meters (120 feet), 400 meters, or "about one mile" (1,600 meters)
- Lou Gehrig of the New York Yankees appeared in his 1,308th consecutive Major League Baseball game, breaking the record held by Everett Scott since 1925. Scott's streak had ended on May 5, 1925, while Gehrig's began on June 1 of the same year; in the game in St. Louis, Gehrig got two singles in a 7–6 loss to the St. Louis Browns. Gehrig would go on to play 822 more straight games, and his record would last until broken by Cal Ripken Jr. on September 6, 1995.
- Born: Gene Kranz, NASA Flight Director for the Gemini and Apollo missions; in Toledo, Ohio

== August 18, 1933 (Friday) ==
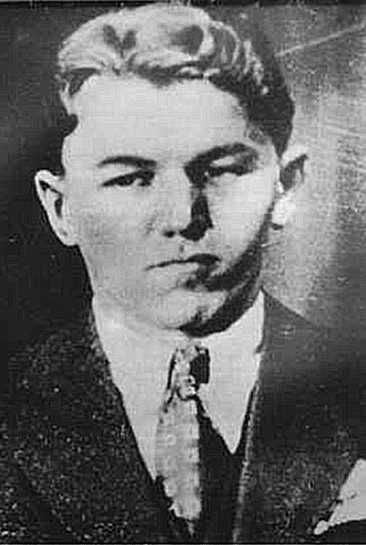
Nelson

- Lester Gillis, better known as "Baby Face Nelson", committed his first bank robbery, entering the Peoples Savings Bank in Grand Haven, Michigan with five other gunmen, and getting away with $14,000 in cash.
- Born: Roman Polanski, French-Polish film director known for Chinatown; in Paris

== August 19, 1933 (Saturday) ==
- The first "soapbox car" race was held in Dayton, Ohio, sponsored by the Dayton Daily News, organized by reporter Myron Scott, and participated in by 362 boys who built their own cars to ride in while rolling downhill, powered only by gravity. The All-American Soapbox Derby moved in 1937 to Akron, Ohio, where it has been held annually ever since.
- The "Emergency Education Program" (EEP) was announced by Harry Hopkins, Director of the American Federal Emergency Relief Administration, who proposed the hiring of 40,000 unemployed teachers and sending them to educate rural schoolchildren in communities of fewer than 2,500 people, as well as conducting adult literacy programs. EEP would be expanded in September, October and February.
- Black Mountain College was founded in the town of Black Mountain, North Carolina to provide an alternative education with a focus on the arts, and lasted until 1957.
- Died: Antonio Aincairt, Cuban law enforcement officer and chief of the Havana police, hanged himself as an angry mob closed in on him. Aincairt, who had overseen the torture and murder of citizens, had been unable to flee the country and had been in hiding for a week.

== August 20, 1933 (Sunday) ==
- As his hunger strike continued, the Mahatma Gandhi was removed from jail and taken to a hospital at Poona, where he was placed under tight security.
- Born: George J. Mitchell, U.S. Senate Majority Leader 1989 to 1995; in Waterville, Maine

== August 21, 1933 (Monday) ==
- "Brick Bradford" made his debut as a newspaper comic strip of the same name. Written by William Ritt and drawn by Clarence Gray, the science fiction adventure strip, distributed by King Features Syndicate, would run until 1987.
- Mrs. Giles Borrett became the first female newscaster, broadcasting the six o'clock evening news bulletin over the BBC radio network. After two months, BBC took her off of the air, for "technical reasons".
- The Eighteenth Zionist Congress started in Prague, capital of Czechoslovakia and would continue until September 4.
- Born:
  - Janet Baker, English mezzo-soprano; in Hatfield, South Yorkshire
  - Barry Norman, English film critic; in London (died 2017)

== August 22, 1933 (Tuesday) ==
- Austria's sovereignty was threatened by the massing, of at least six thousand members of the Austrian Nazi Party, at the border shared with Germany.

== August 23, 1933 (Wednesday) ==
- The Nazi regime in Germany published the first of four lists of people whose German citizenship, passports and other privileges were withdrawn. On the first list of 33 names, only a few of them Jewish, were authors Heinrich Mann, Lion Feuchtwanger, Ernst Toller, and Kurt Tucholsky.
- Born:
  - Robert Curl, American chemist, 1996 Nobel Prize in Chemistry laureate; in Alice, Texas (d. 2022)
  - Pete Wilson, Governor of California 1991 to 1999; in Lake Forest, Illinois
- Died: Mrs. Anton Dasch, 36, convicted murderer who starved herself to death in order to avoid execution in the electric chair in Texas. With no intervention on her hunger strike, the killer of Henry J. Stoever dropped from 250 pounds to 130 pounds.

== August 24, 1933 (Thursday) ==
- After a vote was taken by his cabinet, the new provisional President of Cuba, Carlos Manuel de Céspedes y Quesada, decreed the immediate dissolution of the Congress, "thereby throwing out all officers elected by virtue of 1928 constitutional reforms". He scheduled new elections for six months in the future, to be held on February 24, 1934.
- Born: Ray W. Scott Jr., American angler and entrepreneur who created the Bassmaster Classic and other professional fishing tournaments; in Montgomery, Alabama

== August 25, 1933 (Friday) ==
- Registering 7.5 magnitude, the Diexi earthquake at Mao County, Sichuan, China killed 9,300 people.
- The Haavara Agreement was concluded between Nazi Germany's Ministry of the Economy, and Zionist representatives, to allow German Jews to leave Nazi Germany and to move to Palestine, as well as to transfer part of their financial assets and to ship their possessions. From 1933 to the outbreak of the world war six years later, 60,000 German Jews would emigrate to the future country of Israel without interference from the Hitler regime.
- Born: Tom Skerritt, American actor; in Detroit

== August 26, 1933 (Saturday) ==
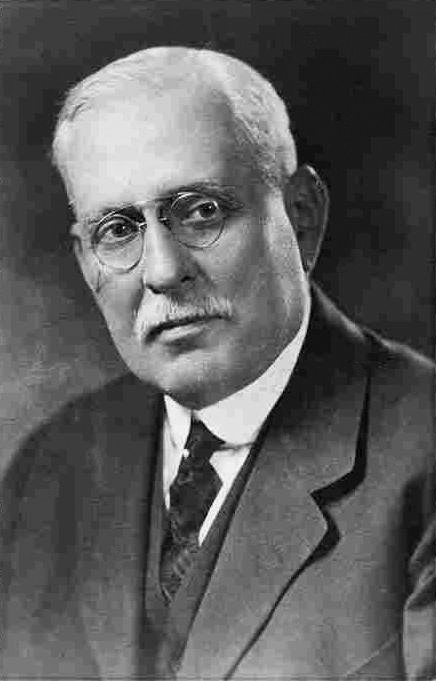
Insull

- Former multimillionaire Samuel Insull, who had fled the United States to avoid prosecution for fraud, was arrested in Greece at the request of the United States, for extradition.
- Jack McGurn, hunted by police as a public enemy, was arrested at the Western Open Golf Championship, where he had been playing under the alias of Vincent Gebhardi.

== August 27, 1933 (Sunday) ==
- Louisiana Senator Huey Long was involved in a physical altercation at the Sands Point Bath Club in Sands Point, New York. At 3 in the morning in the club washroom, Long became involved in some kind of scuffle and received a black eye. Long later claimed in a written statement that he had been jumped by three or four complete strangers, but it was rumored that the real story was that Long was punched after he had relieved himself on the man in the next urinal. The incident made news around the world, and Collier's magazine even offered a medal and a cash prize to the assailant if he would come forward. The reward was never claimed.

== August 28, 1933 (Monday) ==
- U.S. President Roosevelt issued Executive Order 6260, prohibiting American citizens and U.S. residents from hoarding gold, or attempting to ship it to a foreign bank. With exceptions, all possessors of gold were required to file a report within 15 days to the nearest office of the Collector of Internal Revenue. U.S. Treasury regulations gave American citizens until January 30, 1934, to exchange gold certificates and gold coins for other U.S. currency, or face up to ten years imprisonment and a $10,000 fine. No person was ever punished under the regulation, and the restriction against gold coins would later be eased for collectors who could persuade the Treasury Department that the coins were being kept for their "special numismatic value"; the rule against gold certificates would not be rescinded until April 24, 1964.
- Troops from France invaded and occupied the Principality of Andorra, an independent nation in the Pyrenees Mountains, bordering both France and Spain. The General Council of Andorra presented a protest to the League of Nations four days later.
- Died: Warren A. Bechtel, 60, American engineer and founder of the Bechtel Corporation

== August 29, 1933 (Tuesday) ==
- Gold mining in the United States became subject to Executive Order Number 6261, requiring American gold producers to sell their ore directly to the United States Treasury, "in effect nationalizing the gold mines".
- The New York Times first reported the extent of Nazi Germany's concentration camps in a front-page story that noted 65 camps that held 45,000 inmates.
- Born: Arnold Koller, Swiss Federal Councilor, President of Switzerland 1984 to 1985; in St. Gallen

== August 30, 1933 (Wednesday) ==
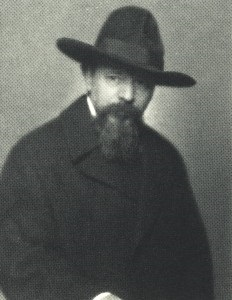
Lessing

- Air France was created by the merger of five French airlines (Air Orient, Compagnie Générale Aéropostale, Société Générale de Transport Aérien (SGTA), Air Union and Compagnie Internationale de Navigation (CIDNA)).
- Theodor Lessing, the German Jewish philosopher who had been critical of the Nazi government, had fled across the border into Czechoslovakia and continued his work in Marienbad (modern-day Mariánské Lázně). When the government offered a reward of 80,000 Reichsmarks to anyone who could bring Lessing back to Germany, two SS troopers went to abduct him, and instead ended up shooting him. Lessing's murder was "an event that is said to have convinced Albert Einstein of the danger of trying to return to Germany."

== August 31, 1933 (Thursday) ==
- Babe Ruth announced that he would retire from baseball at the end of the season.
- Died: Theodor Lessing, 61, exiled German Jewish philosopher
