= International legal theories =

Theories explaining international law

International legal theory, or theories of international law, comprise a variety of theoretical and methodological approaches used to explain and analyse the content, formation and effectiveness of international law and institutions and to suggest improvements. Some approaches center on the question of compliance: why states follow international norms in the absence of a coercive power that ensures compliance. Other approaches focus on the problem of the formation of international rules: why states voluntarily adopt international legal norms, that limit their freedom of action, in the absence of a world legislature (centralized legislature, court with compulsory jurisdiction, or an executive with enforcement powers). Other perspectives are policy oriented; they elaborate theoretical frameworks and instruments to criticize the existing rules and make suggestions on how to improve them. Some of these approaches are based on domestic legal theory, others are interdisciplinary, while others have been developed expressly to analyse international law.

== Classical approaches to international law ==
=== International law in ancient Rome ===
The idea of international law in Roman times is a complicated one. For, not only does the Roman Republic and following empire itself dominate a long period of time in history, but also the very debate over whether or not the term "international law" is an applicable term is not yet decided. Many scholars and authors define international law as "the law governing relations between sovereign, territorial states." Any attempt to find a similar parallel in Roman law would find a logical starting point in the ius gentium (the laws of nations). The ius gentium began as a Roman recognition of like legal practices and institutions (such as slavery) that was found at that time in most states. This brand of law was in fact private law in itself and mainly dictated the way in which the Roman state was to deal with individual foreigners, not entire states. However, when citizenship was granted to all free men in the empire in 212 A.D. ius gentium ceased to cling to its original definition and instead was applied to states as a whole. Some semblance of modern international law can therefore be found in this shift. The actual extent of these origins and their relevance to modern law is a topic that has not yet been approached in any depth.

=== Natural law ===
Many early international legal theorists were concerned with axiomatic truths thought to be reposed in natural law. Sixteenth century natural law writer, Francisco de Vitoria, a professor of theology at the University of Salamanca, examined the questions of the just war, the Spanish authority in the Americas, and the rights of the Native American people.

=== Eclectic or Grotian approach ===
Hugo Grotius, a Dutch theologian, humanist and jurist played a key role in the development of modern international law. In his De jure Belli ac Pacis Libri Tres ("Three Books on the Law of War and Peace") of 1625, and drawing from the Bible and from St. Augustine's just war theory, he argued that nations as well as persons ought to be governed by universal principles based on morality and divine justice. Drawing, though, from domestic contract law, he argued that relations among polities ought to be governed by the law of peoples, the jus gentium, established by the consent of the community of nations on the basis of the principle of pacta sunt servanda, that is, on the basis of the observance of commitments. On his part, Christian von Wolff, contended the international community should be a world superstate (civitas maxima), having authority over the component member states. Emmerich de Vattel rejected this view and argued instead for the equality of states as articulated by 18th century natural law. In Le droit des gens, de Vattel suggested that the law of nations was composed of custom and law on the one hand, and natural law on the other.

During the seventeenth century, the basic tenets of the Grotian or eclectic school, especially the doctrines of legal equality, territorial sovereignty, and independence of states, became the fundamental principles of the European political and legal system and were enshrined in the 1648 Peace of Westphalia.

=== Legal positivism ===
The early positivist school emphasized the importance of custom and treaties as sources of international law. Early positivist scholar Alberico Gentili used historical examples to posit that positive law (jus voluntarium) was determined by general consent. Another positivist scholar, Richard Zouche, published the first manual of international law in 1650.

Legal positivism became the dominant legal theory of 18th century and found its way into international legal philosophy. At the time, Cornelius van Bynkershoek asserted that the bases of international law were customs and treaties commonly consented to by various states. John Jacob Moser emphasized the importance of state practice in international law. Georg Friedrich von Martens published the first systematic manual on positive international law, Precis du droit des gens moderne de l'Europe. During the 19th century, positivist legal theory became even more dominant due to nationalism and the Hegelian philosophy. International commercial law became a branch of domestic law: private international law, separate from public international law. Positivism narrowed the range of international practice that might qualify as law, favouring "rationality" over "morality" and "ethics". The 1815 Congress of Vienna marked the formal recognition of the political and international legal system based on the conditions of Europe.

Modern legal positivists consider international law as a unified system of rules that emanates from the states' will. International law, as it is, is an "objective" reality that must be distinguished from law "as it should be." Classic positivism demands rigorous tests for legal validity. Extralegal arguments (i.e., arguments that have no textual, systemic or historical basis on the law) are deemed irrelevant to legal analysis. There is only hard law, no soft law. Criticisms of positivist international legal theory include its rigidity, its focus on state consent, without allowing for interpretation, and the fact that it does not allow moral judgements regarding a State's conduct as long as it follows international norms.

== International relations – international law approaches ==
Legal scholars have drawn from the four main schools of thought in the areas of political science and international relations: realism, liberalism, institutionalism, and constructivism to examine, through an interdisciplinary approach, the content of legal rules and institutions, to explain why and how international law and legal institutions came to be and why they are effective. These methods have led some scholars to reconceptualize international law in general.

=== Realism ===
Realism contends that, in an anarchic international system, states' main objective is for survival that obligates them to maximize their relative power in order to preserve their territory and existence. Since international cooperation is possible only inasmuch as it responds to the states' self-interest in maximizing their power and prospects for survival, states do not pursue cooperation on the basis of normative commitments. According to Realist legal scholars, states adopt only international legal norms that either enhance their power, formalize the subordination of weaker states, or that they intend to violate deliberately to their own advantage. International Law may thus address only peripheral matters that do not impact the states' power or autonomy. Consequently, for realists, international law is a "tenuous net of breakable obligations."

Within the Realist approach, some scholars have proposed an "enforcement theory" according to which international legal norms are effective insofar as they "publicize clear rules, enhance monitoring of compliance, and institutionalize collective procedures for punishing violations, thereby enhancing the deterrent and coercive effects of a stable balance of power." Thus, the role of reciprocity and sanctions is underlined. Morrow, for instance, notes that:

International politics in modern times generally recognizes no authority above the nation-state. Agreements among states are enforceable only by the agreeing states themselves. This assumption of anarchy poses a paradox for agreements to limit violence during wartime. (...) Reciprocity serves as the main tool to enforce agreements in international politics. Enforcement of an agreement is devolved to the parties themselves. Damaged parties have the option to respond with retaliatory sanctions to a violation of an agreement. The threat of reciprocal sanctions may be sufficient to deter violations, and so agreements can be enforced in international politics.

=== Liberalism ===
Based on the liberal international relations theory, some scholars argue that the states' stance towards international law is determined by their domestic politics and, in particular, by the aggregation of the preferences of key domestic individuals and groups toward the rule of law. Thus, democratic states, having a representative government, are more likely than non-democratic states to accept the legal regulation of both domestic and international politics, and more likely to accept and observe international law. Furthermore, democratic societies are linked by a complex net of interstate, transnational and transgovernmental relations so that both their foreign policy bureaucracies and their civil societies are interested in promoting and strengthening transnational cooperation through the creation and observance of international legal norms. Hence, the adoption of and the compliance with international legal norms among democratic states should be easier and more peaceful than the observance of international law among non-democratic states. In this regard, Anne-Marie Slaughter notes that:

Agreements concluded among liberal States are more likely to be concluded in an atmosphere of mutual trust, a precondition that will facilitate any kind of enforcement. In particular, however, the assumptions that these are agreements reached with the participation of a network of individuals and groups in the participating States, and that these States are committed to the rule of law enforced by national judiciaries should lead to more 'vertical' enforcement through domestic courts. This mode of enforcement contrasts with the traditional 'horizontal' mode involving state responsibility, reciprocity, and countermeasures.

=== Rational choice and game theory ===
This approach to law applies theories of economics to identify the legal implications of maximizing behavior inside and outside of markets. Economics is the study of rational choice under limited conditions. Rational choice is the assumption that individual actors seek to maximize their preferences. Most of the economic theory employed here is neoclassical traditional economics. Economic techniques include price theory, which evaluates strategic interaction between actors. Transaction cost economics, which incorporates cost of identifying actors, negotiating, and costs of enforcing agreements into price theory. Game theory can demonstrate how actors with maximizing behavior might fail to take action increase join gain. Public choice applies economic tools to problems outside of markets. These tools are used to describe and evaluate law. Using these tools, laws are tested for economic efficiency. Economic theories are also used to propose changes in the law. This approach urges the adoption of laws that maximize wealth. Potential application of this approach would begin with a text-based interpretation. A secondary concern is whether or not an actual "market" context is functioning well. Thirdly, ways to improve the imperfect market are proposed. This approach could be used to analyze general legal questions, because this approach provides highly specified rules and provides the rationale for using them. This approach relies on assumptions that perfect competition exists, and that individuals will behave to maximize their preferences. The empirical presence of these conditions is often difficult to determine.

=== International legal process ===
The classic International Legal Process is the method of studying how international law is practically applied to, and functions within international policy, as well as the study of how international law can be improved. "It concentrates not so much on the exposition of rules and their content as on how international legal rules are actually used by the makers of foreign policy". ILP was developed in response to the "realists from the discipline of international relations", who realized with the beginning of the Cold War how little international law played a role in international affairs. ILP was made a legitimate theory in the 1968 casebook International Legal Process, by Chayes, Ehrlich and Lowenfeld, in which the American legal process method was adapted to create an international legal process. ILP describes the way international legal processes work, and the formal and informal ways that foreign offices incorporate international law. ILP also measures the extent to which individuals are held accountable for abuses in international conflicts. While ILP recognizes that international law does not force decision makers' actions, it suggests that international law serves as a justification, constraint, and organizing device. Criticism of ILP's lack of normative qualities in its method resulted in the emergence of a new ILP. The New International Legal Process (NLP) incorporates both law as a process and as the values of each society respectively. Unlike the American Legal System, it considers normative values other than democracy, such as "…feminism, republicanism, law and economics, liberalism as well as human rights, peace and protection to the environment." The NLP is unique in its flexibility in adapting to the evolution of values. This component of the method is important in order to resolve the changing of legal standards over time. The NLP shows its true departure from the ILP by addressing what happens in the situation of conflict, as well as what should be happening.

== Policy-oriented perspectives ==
=== New Haven School ===
The New Haven School is a policy-oriented perspective on international law pioneered by Myres S. McDougal, Harold D. Lasswell, and W. Michael Reisman. Its intellectual antecedents lie in sociological jurisprudence of Roscoe Pound and the reformist ambitions of the American Legal Realists. From the standpoint of the New Haven approach, jurisprudence is a theory about making social choices. International law itself reflects the expectations of relevant community members about stable patterns of behavior created by assertions of control by legal authorities. The primary jurisprudential and intellectual tasks are the prescription and application of policy in ways that maintain community order and simultaneously achieve the best possible approximation of the community's social goals. These normative social goals or values of the New Haven approach include maximizing shared community values, such as wealth, enlightenment, skill, well-being, affection, respect and rectitude. The teleological goal of New Haven School jurisprudence is the interpretation of international law as a system of creating minimum world public order, with continued progress toward the development of shared values into an optimum order.

=== Critical Legal Studies ===
Critical Legal Studies (CLS) emerged as a legal theory in America during the 1970s. It exists to this day as a method of analyzing international law from a highly theoretical perspective. The method proposes that the nature of international law is limited because it is determined by language, which is biased and still stuck in the conventional structures of politics and power. Critical Legal scholars argue that those structures of power can be found within the binaries that exist in legal language (man vs. woman, majority vs. minority, etc.). Recognizing the political aspect of international law, these scholars also argue that universality is impossible. Criticism of this method suggests that this radical practice is impossible to put into application. It was successful, however, in pushing forward other approaches to international law (feminist, cultural relativist, etc.) because of its deep analysis of language, and all the imbalance that it reveals.

=== Central case approach ===
The central case approach is a method of looking at human rights situations. This approach recognizes the existence of certain universal rights. It begins analyzing a human rights issue by constructing a hypothetical ideal situation in which those rights are applied, a standard against which to compare an actual situation. The central case approach then investigates to what extent, and in what ways the actual situation deviates from the ideal (or the central case). The central case approach allows for more complexity than the traditional binary method of analysis. In binary terms, human rights are simply violated or they are upheld. This does not allow for degrees of severity of a human rights violation, which creates a deceptively simplistic view of a situation.

John Finnis developed the concept of a central case as it applied to assessing legal systems; Tai-Heng Cheng was the first to apply it to human rights. If used by decision-makers, the central case approach could be effective in preventing human rights abuses. It takes into account a society's political and social situations in addition to specific human rights abuses. This enables it to detect trends of human rights abuses, and the reasons behind these trends. The depth of a central case analysis exposes the different degrees of human rights abuses that occur, allowing policy makers to focus on the most severe cases and patterns of abuse with more urgency. The central case approach provides an accurate and flexible picture of situations that are in a state of change. Whereas a binary appraisal would conclude whether a human right had been violated at one point in time, the central case approach can detect shifting political and social conditions and patterns that give a more nuanced view of the state of human rights.

=== Feminist legal theory ===
Feminist legal theory critiques current legal vocabulary and practice by arguing it is patriarchal, presenting men as the norm and women as a deviation from the norm. Feminist theorists propose to change legal language to make it more inclusive of women, or to rethink law completely, so it is possible to promote broader social goals of justice and equality. Feminist methods seek to expose the biases from which international law is written and particularly the notion that women are more vulnerable than men and need special protection under the law. Feminist theorist Hilary Charlesworth criticizes the dialogue of women as victims in need of protection from both men and international law. Additionally, she argues that the irony of the dominant language is that while it aims to especially protect women, the emphasis is on the protection of her honor and not on the protection of her social, cultural and economic rights.

=== LGBT legal theory ===
Lesbian, Gay, Bisexual, and Transgender/Transsexual (LGBT) International Law Theory is a critical school of thought that continues to develop as the shortcomings of international law are realized, in regard to the integration of queer theory into international law theory. While human rights conventions have recently begun to generalize in regard to equality and its recipients, in the past, any discussions of sexual orientation and gender identity have gone largely untouched. The movement of LGBT International Law Theory centers on the inclusion and awareness of LGBT rights (and protection of persons), as well as the integration of queer theory within the realm of international law. As LGBT theory has become more prominent in scholarly works, international courts and international law organizations (particularly the European Union and the United Nations) have considered workplace discrimination on the basis of sexuality, issues stemming from the definition of family in regard to homosexual unions, the position of transsexuals in the question of sexual orientation, the need for recognition of LGBT rights in regard to general health advocacy and the HIV/AIDS crisis, the inclusion of and LGBT advocacy group within the UN (with advisor status), and the ongoing active persecution of people engaging in homosexual acts, among other issues. According to scholar Nancy Levit, the challenges for gay legal theory are twofold: to move away from the frailties of both formal equality and antisubordination theories, and to develop ways of representing sexual minorities that will make them more acceptable, if not valuable, in a broader cultural context, that is the critical body of LGBT International Law Theory.

=== Third World Approaches to International Law ===
Third World Approaches to International Law (TWAIL) is a critical approach to international law that is not a "method" in the strict sense of questioning "what the law is". Rather, it is an approach to law that is unified by a particular set of concerns and analytical tools with which to explore them. It is an approach that draws primarily from the history of the encounter between international law and colonized peoples. TWAIL shares many concepts with post-colonial studies, feminist theory, critical legal studies, Marxist theory and critical race theory. TWAIL scholarship prioritizes in its study the power dynamic between the First World and Third World and the role of international law in legitimizing the subjugation and oppression of Third World peoples. TWAIL scholars try to avoid presenting the "Third World" as a unified, coherent place but rather use the term to indicate peoples who have the shared experience of underdevelopment and marginalization.

Contemporary TWAIL scholarship has it origins in works of jurists such as B. S. Chimni, Georges Abi-Saab, F. Garcia-Amador, R.P. Anand, Mohammed Bedjaoui, and Taslim O. Elias. Over the years, several Western scholars have been sympathetic to the Third World's position and made important contributions to this body of scholarship, and these include, scholars such as C.H. Alexandrowicz, Richard Falk, Nico Schrijver and PJ.I.M. de Waart. David Kennedy and Martti Koskenniemi have also contributed support in their own work. TWAIL as a loose network of scholars has had several conferences thus far.

== See also ==
- Public international law
- Jurisprudence
- Rule according to higher law
- Regional integration law
- Third World Approaches to International Law (TWAIL)
- Realism
