= June 1933 =

Month of 1933

<<	June 1933					>>
Su	Mo	Tu	We	Th	Fr	Sa
				1	2	3
4	5	6	7	8	9	10
11	12	13	14	15	16	17
18	19	20	21	22	23	24
25	26	27	28	29	30

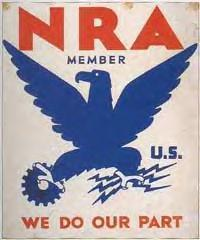
June 16, 1933: National Recovery Administration is created

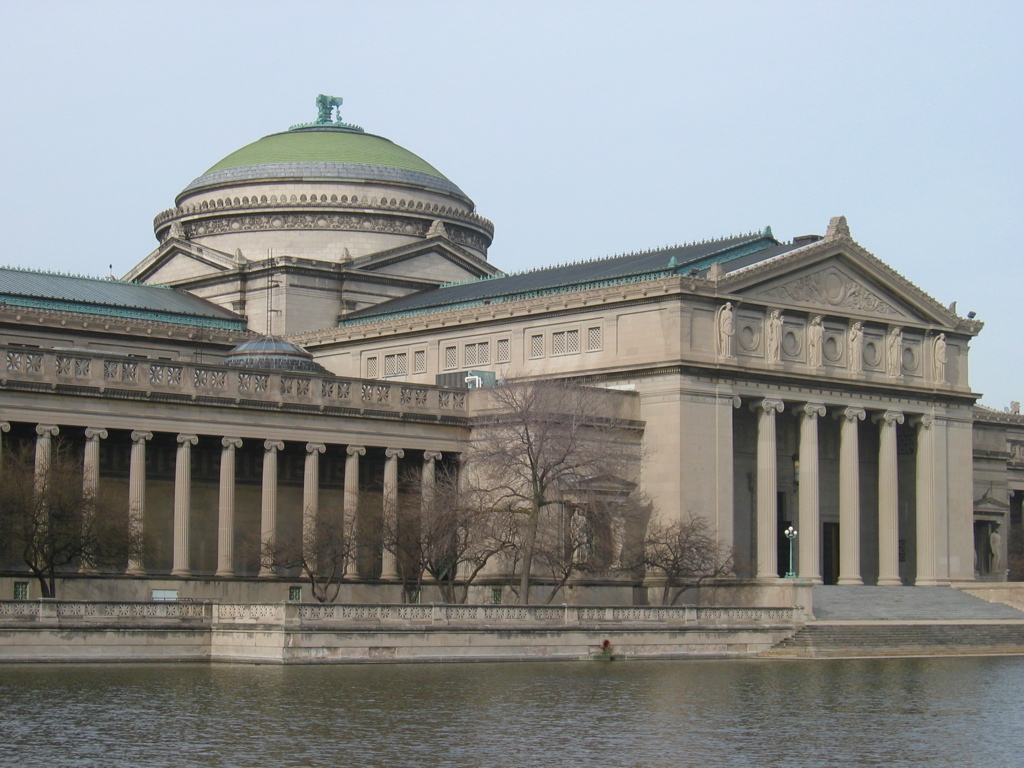
June 19, 1933: Museum of Science and Industry opens in Chicago

June 10, 1933: INS created

The following events occurred in June 1933:

== June 1, 1933 (Thursday) ==
- Germany's Law for the Encouragement of Marriage took effect, providing for the Ehestandsdarlehen (Marriage loan) to all German Aryan newlyweds, with 1000 Reichsmarks to be loaned, interest free, to couples on condition that the wife quit employment or remain unemployed. After encouraging women to vacate jobs in favor of men, the law was amended to encourage the growth of the Aryan population, with the debt to be reduced 25% each time a child was born. In the first four years of the program, 700,000 couples took out the loans.
- The Soviet Communist Party began a purge of party members whom General Secretary Joseph Stalin described as "double-dealers masked as Bolsheviks". Commissions in ten cities, including Moscow and Leningrad, screened one million members, and expelled one out of every six.
- J. P. Morgan Jr. was testifying before the Senate Banking Committee when a man placed a circus midget, Lya Graf, onto his lap. The U.S. Senate warned that any newspapers that printed the photo risked being excluded from future Senate hearings.
- The Soviet Navy activated its new Northern Naval Flotilla as part of its continued growth, the second new fleet created in 15 months. On April 21, 1932, it had created the Naval Forces of the Far East.
- Born: Charles Wilson, U.S. Representative from Texas 1973–1996, whose role in obtaining funding for Afghan resistance to the Soviet invasion was dramatized in the film Charlie Wilson's War; in Trinity, Texas (d. 2010)

== June 2, 1933 (Friday) ==
- Bernhard Rust, Minister of Science, Art, and Education for Prussia, ordered that Jews be banned from youth, welfare and gymnastic organizations and that they be denied access to athletic facilities. At the start of 1933, there had been 40,000 German Jews in sports clubs, including 250 Jewish sports organizations. By 1935, there were none.
- Seven people were killed and another 50 injured in an explosion at the Richfield Oil Company refinery in Long Beach, California.

== June 3, 1933 (Saturday) ==
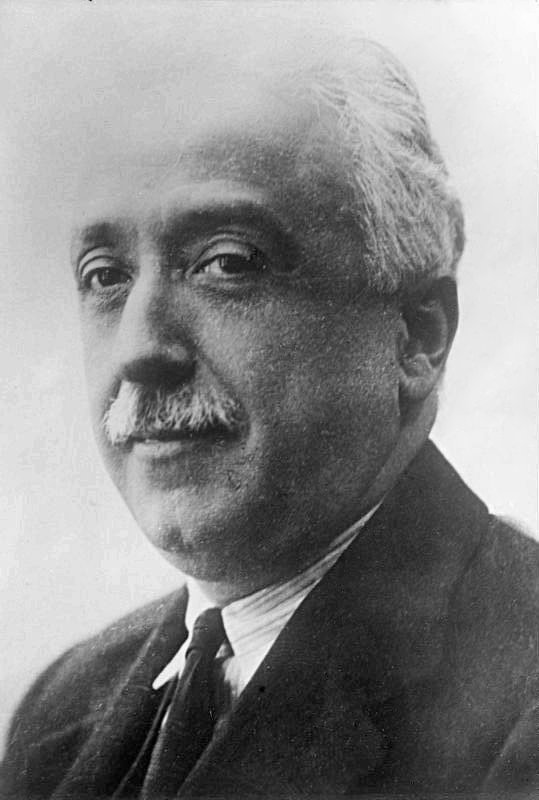
President Alcala-Zamora

- Spain's President Niceto Alcalá-Zamora, and other prominent members of the government of Spain, were excommunicated from the Roman Catholic Church by Pope Pius XI, for having signed laws nationalizing Catholic church properties.
- Prince Wilhelm of Prussia, the 26-year-old son of former German Crown Prince Wilhelm, married Dorothea von Salviati, his college sweetheart, at a ceremony in Bonn. His grandfather, the former Kaiser Wilhelm II, decreed that he had forfeited his rights to reign in the event of the restoration of the monarchy. A cheering crowd of 10,000 greeted the newlyweds as they emerged from church.

== June 4, 1933 (Sunday) ==
- Radio Luxembourg began broadcasting as an English-language station aimed at listeners in England, where the British Broadcasting Corporation had a monopoly on domestic radio. Within a year, 90 British companies were running commercials on Radio Luxembourg, since the BBC did not permit advertising. In 1931, Radio Normandy had pioneered the concept of broadcasting commercial radio from the European continent to Britain.
- An express train carrying holiday travelers from Paris to the Brittany coast derailed near Nantes, killing 14 people. The train struck debris that had spilled onto the track from the wreck of a freight train on adjoining track.

== June 5, 1933 (Monday) ==
- The U.S. Congress passed the Gold Clause Resolution (Pub. Res. 73-10) nullifying the right of creditors to demand payment in gold.

== June 6, 1933 (Tuesday) ==
- The first drive-in theater, created by Richard Hollingshead, opened outside of Camden, New Jersey, on Admiral Wilson Boulevard in Pennsauken Township. At 8:30 pm, the first film ever shown at the Automobile Movie Theatre was Wife Beware.
- The first concrete was poured for Hoover Dam, with the last batch poured on May 29, 1935.
- Born: Heinrich Rohrer, Swiss physicist, 1986 Nobel Prize laureate; in St. Gallen (d. 2013)
- Died: Prince Shirdar Mohammed Aziz Khan, brother of King Nadir Shah of Afghanistan, and the kingdom's ambassador to Germany, was assassinated in Berlin by an Afghan student.

== June 7, 1933 (Wednesday) ==
- Representatives of France, Britain, Germany and Italy initialled the Four-Power Pact in Rome, pledging Europe a decade of peace and pledging to work toward disarmament. The ceremony took place in Italian Premier Benito Mussolini's office at the Palazzo Venezia in Rome.

== June 8, 1933 (Thursday) ==
- Before a crowd of 56,000 at Yankee Stadium, Max Baer of California, knocked out Germany's Max Schmeling.
- The International Olympic Committee awarded the 1936 Winter Olympic Games to the German city of Garmisch-Partenkirchen, ahead of Montreal and St. Moritz.
- Born: Joan Rivers, American comedian; as Joan Molinsky in Brooklyn, New York City (d. 2014)

== June 9, 1933 (Friday) ==
- In North Arlington, New Jersey, an explosion at the Atlantic Pyroxylin Waste Company killed ten people and injured others. The company manufactured cellophane from highly flammable nitrocellulose.
- German scientists Rudolf Nebel and Herbert Schaefer did the first test launch of a rocket for the "Magdeburg Project", with the goal of eventually sending a man into space, but the first test flight at Wolmirstedt failed. The project would be abandoned in August.
- The romantic comedy film Professional Sweetheart starring Ginger Rogers was released.
- Born: Georges Abi-Saab, Egyptian specialist in international law; in Heliopolis

== June 10, 1933 (Saturday) ==
- The Taurus Express passenger train derailed at Eskişehir while on its run between Istanbul and Adana, killing 50 people.
- As part of Executive Order 6166, the U.S. Bureau of Immigration and the U.S. Bureau of Naturalization were merged to create the Immigration and Naturalization Service (INS), originally as part of the U.S. Department of Labor, and then in 1940, part of the U.S. Department of Justice. Under the same order, all national monuments and national cemeteries were placed under the administration of the National Park Service.
- Less than three weeks after being paroled from prison, John Dillinger robbed the first of many banks with his gang, taking $10,600 from the National Bank of New Carlisle, Ohio.
- The Barter Theatre was first opened in Abingdon, Virginia.
- While driving near Wellington, Texas, Clyde Barrow failed to yield to warning signs at a bridge under construction and the car flipped into a ravine. Bonnie Parker and fellow Barrow Gang member W.D. Jones were with Barrow at the time. Parker sustained severe third degree burns to her right leg.
- Born:
  - F. Lee Bailey, American lawyer, in Waltham, Massachusetts (d. 2021)
- Died: Winchell Smith, 62, American playwright

== June 11, 1933 (Sunday) ==
- The first ever qualification matches for the World Cup began as teams from 27 countries played for the 16 available spots for the 1934 FIFA World Cup, which was to be hosted in Italy in May 1934. Sweden defeated Estonia, 6 to 2, in a match at the Olympic Stadium in Stockholm. The 13 teams for the 1930 FIFA World Cup, the inaugural competition, had been selected by invitation from FIFA.
- Seven unfortunate passengers, who bought tickets for a sightseeing trip over the World's Fair in Chicago, were killed along with the pilot and co-pilot when a wing crumpled. The amphibian plane, Northern Light, plunged 600 feet to the ground in Glenview, Illinois.
- Born: Gene Wilder, American film actor (Willy Wonka and the Chocolate Factory); as Jerome Silberman, in Milwaukee (d. 2016)
- Died: Eugene James, 19, American jockey who had won the 1932 Kentucky Derby, drowned in Lake Michigan.

== June 12, 1933 (Monday) ==
- The World Economic Conference of 1933 began in London, with representatives from 64 nations, to discuss the reduction of trade barriers, settlement of war debts, stabilizing exchange rates and coordinating monetary policies. The conference would last until July 27, without accomplishing its goals.
- Born: Eddie Adams, American photographer and Pulitzer Prize winner; in Kensington, Pennsylvania (d. 2004)

== June 13, 1933 (Tuesday) ==
- The Home Owners' Loan Corporation was established by law to provide lower interest (5 percent) loans to prevent foreclosures, and the first to be made at a fixed rate. At the time of its creation, 41 percent of home mortgages in the United States had been in default. The HOLC accepted applications until 1936, and effectively refinanced 992,531 homes. After the last of the 15-year loans was collected back, the HOLC ceased operations in 1951.

== June 14, 1933 (Wednesday) ==
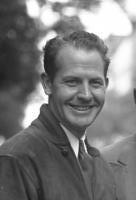
Mattern

- Jimmie Mattern, seeking to become the first person to fly a plane solo around the world, set off from Khabarovsk in Siberian Russia, headed toward U.S. territory for the first time since his departure from New York. Mattern never arrived in Nome, Alaska. Unbeknownst to most of the world, his airplane, the Century of Progress, had engine failure 14 hours after takeoff, but he had crashed on land, near the Anadyr River, which he would reach after three days. Mattern would find an island in the middle of the river, reasoning that he would be able to signal boats more easily. He would finally be found after two weeks, on June 28, by Eskimos in two rowboats.
- The United States agreed to accept partial payment of $75,950,000 owed by Great Britain for loans from World War One, taking ten million dollars. An earlier request to pay 10% had been refused by President Roosevelt.
- Born:
  - Vladislav Rastorotsky, Soviet gymnastics coach; in Liski, Russian SFSR (d. 2017)
  - Jerzy Kosinski, Polish-born American novelist (Being There); in Łódź (d. 1991)

== June 15, 1933 (Thursday) ==
- The Glass-Steagall Act of 1933 passed both houses of Congress and was signed into law the next day. The law severely restricted private banks from making risky investments with their depositors' capital.

== June 16, 1933 (Friday) ==
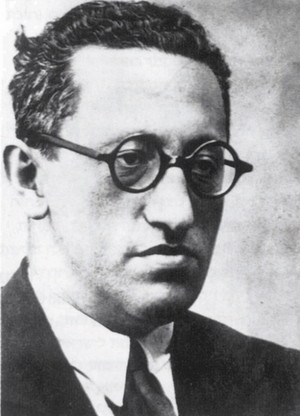
Arlosoroff

- The National Industrial Recovery Act (NIRA) was signed into law after being passed by the U.S. Congress, creating the National Recovery Administration (NRA).
- Haim Arlosoroff, a Zionist leader who had negotiated an agreement with Nazi Germany to provide for emigration of German Jews to Palestine in return for payments, was assassinated while he was walking along the beach at Tel Aviv.
- Polk County, Missouri, Sheriff William Killingworth was released unharmed after having been kidnapped by gangster Pretty Boy Floyd.
- A census taken in Germany, the first since 1925, showed a population estimated at 65,300,000.
- Born: Margaret Wales-King, Australian murder victim; in Yarraville, Victoria (d. 2002)

== June 17, 1933 (Saturday) ==
- Baldur von Schirach was named "Youth Leader of the German Reich" as the Hitler Youth proceeded to absorb all other youth organizations in Germany.

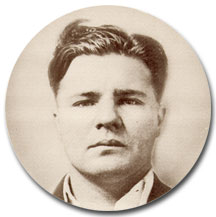
Floyd

- In a gunbattle at the Union Station in Kansas City, Missouri, gangster Pretty Boy Floyd and two of his men, Adam Richetti and Vern Miller, attempted to rescue bank robber Frank Nash, who was being transported by a team of federal agents and local policemen to the federal penitentiary in Leavenworth, Kansas. During the fight, Floyd and his men fired sub-machine guns, killing FBI agent Raymond Caffrey; Police Chief Ott Reed of McAlester, Oklahoma; Kansas City police detectives William Grooms and Frank Hermanson; and, inadvertently, Frank Nash himself.
- Born: Maurice Stokes, American NBA player whose career was halted by a head injury; in Pittsburgh (d. 1970)

== June 18, 1933 (Sunday) ==
- Yang Quan, the Secretary-General of the China League for Civil Rights and a frequent critic of China's Generalissimo Chiang Kai-shek, was assassinated, apparently by Kuomintang agents, in the French Concession in Shanghai.

== June 19, 1933 (Monday) ==
- U.S. Secretary of Agriculture Henry Wallace announced a farm subsidy program to pay farmers to plow under as much as ten million acres of cotton and not to grow it, in order to reduce production and boost the price.
- The Austrian Nazi party was outlawed, by decree of Austrian Chancellor Engelbert Dollfuss, after the party was linked to bombings over the previous two weeks. The decree came after 16 auxiliary police in Krems were injured, earlier in the day, by grenades thrown at them by party members. Germany responded by banning its citizens from visiting Austria.
- The Museum of Science and Industry (Chicago) opened, originally as part of the 1933 World's Fair.
- The Convention on European Broadcasting was signed at Lucerne, Switzerland, by representatives of 21 European nations, with an agreement assigning specific radio frequencies for the various nations.
- Prince Alfonso of the Asturias, former Crown Prince of Spain, and the son of Spain's former King Alfonso XIII, married Sra. Edelmira Sampedro in Lausanne, Switzerland.
- Born: Viktor Patsayev, Soviet cosmonaut who died during the ill-fated Soyuz 11 mission; in Aktyubinsk, Kazakh SSR (now Aktobe, Kazakhstan) (d. 1971)
- Died: Bolivar E. Kemp, 61, U.S. Representative from Louisiana since 1925, died of a heart attack. The Governor's choice of Kemp's widow as the "unopposed" Democratic Party nominee in a special election would lead to rioting.

== June 20, 1933 (Tuesday) ==
- In the Soviet Union, work on the Belomor Canal, linking the White Sea to the Baltic Sea, was completed.
- In the United States, the Illinois Waterway opened, a canal system of locks that linked the Great lakes to the Gulf of Mexico.

San Marino

- Police in Rome announced the arrest of two Sicilian bandits who had been planning to overthrow the government of the tiny republic of San Marino. Antonio Canepa of Palermo had plotted to seize the Republic's police station, military barracks and radio station, then to take control of the treasury to finance a resistance against the Fascist regime in Italy. After he and his co-conspirators were arrested, Catapa was placed in a mental hospital for one year.
- The government of Siam (now Thailand) was overthrown in a bloodless coup staged by Colonel Phraya Phahonphonphayauhasena, who took over after conflicts with the first Prime Minister, Phraya Manopakorn Nititada. As premier, Colonel Phahonphonphayauhasena took on the shorter name of Phot Phahonyothin.
- The Procuracy of the Soviet Union was created to control the national judicial system.
- Actress Barbara Hutton married Prince Alexis Mdivani of the former royal family of Georgia.
- Born: Danny Aiello, American film actor, in New York City (d. 2019)
- Died:
  - Clara Zetkin, 75, German Communist feminist
  - Rose Pastor Stokes, 53, American Communist feminist
  - Hilarius Gilges, 24, African-German entertainer, after being arrested by the Gestapo

== June 21, 1933 (Wednesday) ==
- Joseph Gallo Sr. killed his wife Susie Gallo, and then himself, after being despondent from the financial troubles from his winemaking business. The couple's sons, Ernest Gallo and Julio Gallo inherited 2/3rds of the family assets, and when prohibition was repealed in December, began building the E & J Gallo Winery into what would become a multibillion-dollar company that became the largest manufacturer of California wines. The other 1/3rd went to Joseph Gallo Jr., who would create the Joseph Gallo Farms, one of the largest dairy farming operations and cheese producers in America.
- Born:
  - Bernie Kopell, American television actor and comedian known for The Love Boat; in Brooklyn
  - Max Kozloff, American art critic and photographer; in Chicago (d. 2025)
  - Gerald William Barrax, African-American poet; in Attalla, Alabama (d. 2019)
- Died: George Masa (Masahara Izuka), 52, Japanese-born American photographer

== June 22, 1933 (Thursday) ==
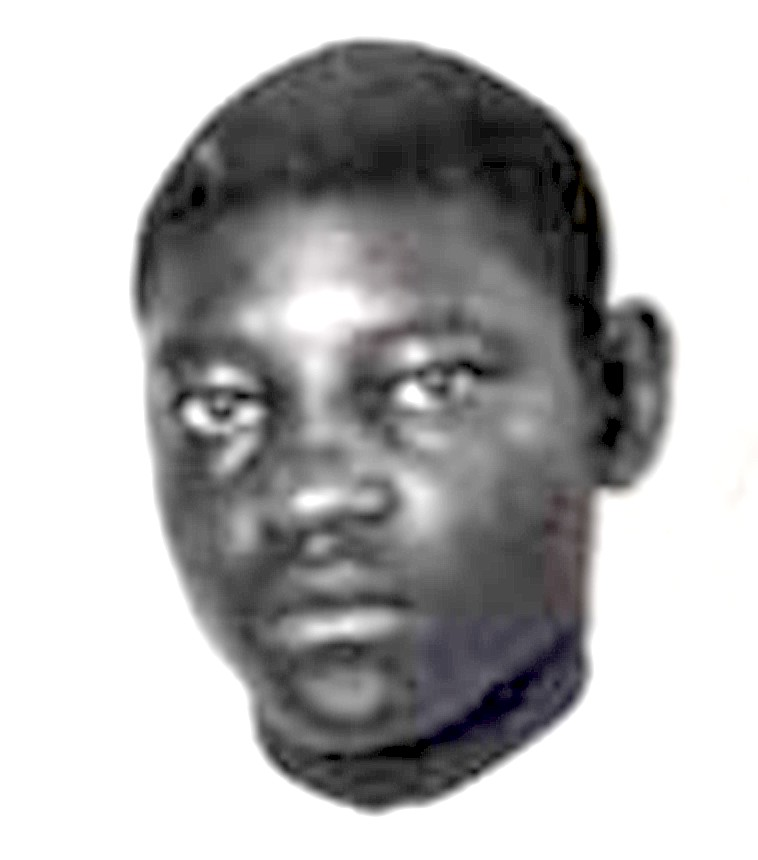
Patterson

- In a ruling that would cost him his judicial career, Alabama circuit judge James E. Horton set aside the April 9 jury verdict against Haywood Patterson, the first of the Scottsboro Boys to be retried on charges of rape in 1931. Judge Horton wrote, after reviewing the proof presented at the trial, that "the evidence greatly preponderates in favor of the defendant", set aside the verdict and the death sentence, and ordered a retrial. In making the unpopular decision, Horton would lose his bid for re-election in 1934, and retire to farming. All of the Scottsboro Boys would later be exonerated and released from prison.
- Germany outlawed the Social Democratic Party of Germany (Sozialdemokratische Partei Deutschlands or SPD), which had won the second largest number of seats (121) in the German Reichstag in the March 5 election. The party would be revived in 1946, winning control of the West German Bundestag in 1969, and merging with the Communist Party in East Germany to form the SED.
- At Watchung, New Jersey, an alert garage employee discovered a 20-pound dynamite bomb that had been attached to the ignition of a car used by Congressman Charles A. Eaton of New Jersey, foiling an assassination attempt.
- Born: Dianne Feinstein, U.S. Senator for California since 1992, Mayor of San Francisco 1978–88; in San Francisco as Dianne Emiel Goldman (d. 2023)

== June 23, 1933 (Friday) ==
- Peru withdrew its troops from the Colombian city of Leticia, as troops from the League of Nations moved in.

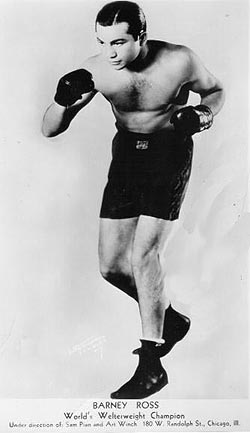
Ross

- Barney Ross defeated Tony Canzoneri in the tenth round of a bout at Chicago Stadium to win the world lightweight and junior welterweight titles.

== June 24, 1933 (Saturday) ==
- The official Nazi newspaper, Völkischer Beobachter, had as its front-page headline "FOREIGN AIRCRAFT OVER BERLIN!", with the false story that a formation of unidentified bombers had dropped leaflets over the German capital, then turned back "toward the East", with the suggestion that the Soviet Union had penetrated German airspace because of a lack of sufficient air defense. The effect was to justify building a powerful German air force armada and airfields.
- Born: Sam Jones, American basketball player, who was part of ten championship winning teams for the Boston Celtics; in Wilmington, North Carolina. (d. 2021)

== June 25, 1933 (Sunday) ==
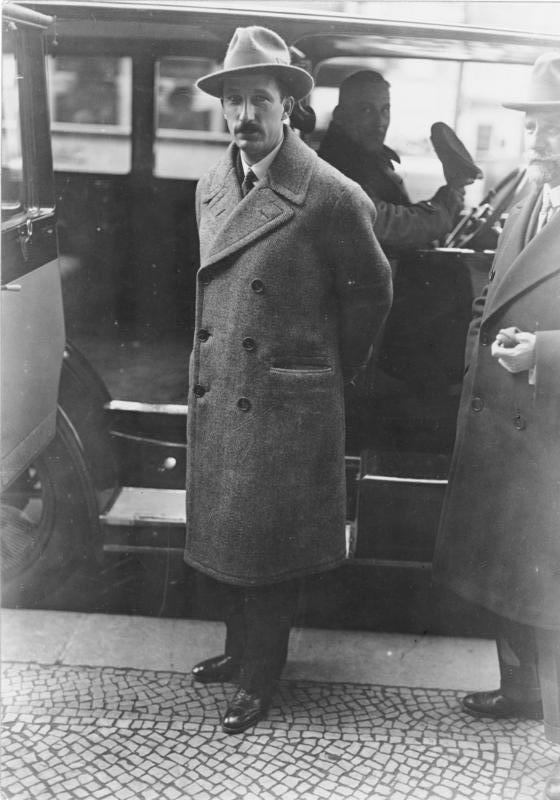
King Boris III

- Seven thousand German members of the Jehovah's Witnesses convened at the Wilmersdorfer Tennishallen in Berlin to resist the persecution of Jehovah's Witnesses in Nazi Germany. From the convention emerged the "Declaration of Facts", which declared that the Witnesses had no intention to get into politics, and that their sole purpose was to preach about the Kingdom of God. Two days later, the Gestapo began arresting anyone who distributed the Declaration and closed the Witnesses' office in Magdeburg.
- Martial law was proclaimed in Bulgaria by King Boris III after discovery of a plot by Communists and Macedonian separatists to overthrow the government.
- Born:
  - James Meredith, African-American who forced the integration of the formerly all-white University of Mississippi in 1962; in Kosciusko, Mississippi
  - Álvaro Siza, Portuguese architect; in Matosinhos
  - Hong Sook-ja, the first woman to stand as a presidential candidate in South Korea; in Keijō (now Seoul)

== June 26, 1933 (Monday) ==
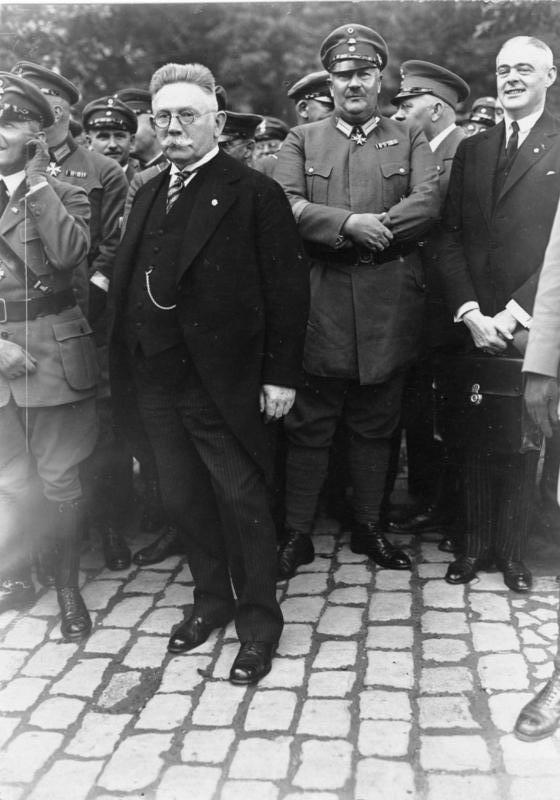
June 26, 1933: Hugenberg fired after helping Hitler win power

- Alfred Hugenberg, whose German National People's Party formed a coalition that helped put the Nazi Party and Adolf Hitler into power, was forced to resign his cabinet positions as Minister of Economics and Minister of Agriculture, ending his attempt to keep Hitler in line. His political party was outlawed the next day. Hugenberg would never re-enter politics and die in 1951.
- Theodor Eicke, was promoted to Standartenführer in the Nazi SS, and began his work as the Commandant of the Dachau concentration camp. A master of organization, Eicke would then go on to expand the network of death camps. He would be killed in 1943 while commanding troops as a Lieutenant General in the Third Battle of Kharkov against the Soviet Union.
- The American Totalisator Company unveiled its first "tote board", the electronic pari-mutuel betting machine, at the Arlington Park race track near Chicago.
- Born: Claudio Abbado, Italian orchestra conductor (London Symphony Orchestra, 1979–87); in Milan (d. 2014)
- Died: R.A. Barnet, 79, American lyricist

== June 27, 1933 (Tuesday) ==
- The German National People's Party (DVNP), which had helped the Nazi Party form a coalition government three months earlier, after the Nazis had failed to secure a majority in the March elections, was outlawed by the Nazi government.
- Germany's program to create a network of superhighways (autobahns) was begun with a decree establishing the Unternehmen Reichsautobahnen company, under the administration of the national railroad.

The Union Jack

- Sir John Gilmour, the British Home Secretary, delivered the last official statement concerning the Union Jack, flag of the United Kingdom. Responding to a question of whether private citizens were barred from displaying the flag, Gilmour stated, "The Union Flag is the national flag and may properly be flown by any British subject on land".
- Born: Gary Crosby, American singer and son of Bing Crosby (d. 1995)

== June 28, 1933 (Wednesday) ==
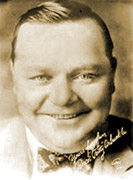
Arbuckle

- Roscoe "Fatty" Arbuckle signed a movie deal with Warner Brothers in the first step of his comeback, with a deal to make a full-length feature film. Arbuckle had made four short (20 minutes) comedy films for Warner, including the recently released How've You Bean?, but no major films for more than a decade. He died of a heart attack in his hotel room the next day.
- Louise Arner Boyd set off on an expedition to Greenland, leading scientists on the Veslekari expedition that sailed from Aalesund, Norway.

== June 29, 1933 (Thursday) ==
- In New York, Primo Carnera of Italy became the new heavyweight boxing champion of the world, knocking out champ Jack Sharkey in the 6th round. Carnera was disliked by many American sportswriters "because so many of his early fights were faked, [and] his American managers were mobsters", according to one author, and there was uncertainty about whether his win over Sharkey was legitimate; Carnera would hold his title for less than a year, losing on June 14, 1934 to boxer Max Baer.
- Gustav Bauer, formerly Chancellor of Germany (1919–20), was arrested in Berlin on charges of corruption.
- Jorge Prado y Ugarteche was sworn in as the new Prime Minister of Peru.
- Died: Fatty Arbuckle, 46, American film actor and comedian

== June 30, 1933 (Friday) ==
- The Screen Actors Guild (SAG) was incorporated as the labor union for actors in film, and later in television. On March 30, 2012, the SAG would merge with the labor union for TV and radio actors, American Federation of Television and Radio Artists (AFTRA), to create the union SAG-AFTRA.
- Films, plays, music, art, radio and the press were placed under the direction of the German Propaganda Ministry, controlled by Joseph Goebbels, by decree of Chancellor Hitler.
