= The Yale Journal of International Law =

- Yale Journal of International Law cover
- Discipline: Law
- Language: English
- Edited by: Varun Char, Jessica Laird

Publication details
- History: 1974-present
- Publisher: Yale Law School (United States)
- Frequency: Biannual

Standard abbreviations
- Bluebook: Yale J. Int'l L.
- ISO 4: Yale J. Int. Law

Indexing
- ISSN: 0889-7743
- LCCN: 86642406
- OCLC no.: 12626339

Links
- Journal homepage

The Yale Journal of International Law is a student-edited international law review at Yale Law School (New Haven, Connecticut). The journal publishes articles on a range of topics in international and comparative law.

== History ==
The Yale Journal of International Law is the oldest of Yale Law School's eight secondary journals still in publication. The journal was founded in 1974 by a group of students who were followers of the New Haven School of international law, and their publication was originally known as Yale Studies in World Public Order. Under the leadership of then editor in chief Eisuke Suzuki, a graduate fellow from Tokyo, the first issue was produced without assistance from the Law School. After being renamed The Yale Journal of World Public Order, the journal obtained its current title. About ten years after its founding, the Yale Law School started to support the journal.

== Content ==
The journal's Seal

Some of the journal's most-cited articles include:

- Kenneth W. Abbott, Modern International Relations Theory: A Prospectus for International Lawyers, Yale J. Int. Law 14:335 (1989)
- Lea Brilmayer, Secession and Self-Determination: A Territorial Interpretation, Yale J. Int. Law 16:177 (1991)
- Raidza Torres, The Rights of Indigenous Populations: The Emerging International Norm, Yale J. Int. Law 16:127 (1991)
- Michael J. Glennon, Two Views of Presidential Foreign Affairs Power: Little v. Barreme or Curtiss-Wright?, Yale J. Int. Law 13:5 (1988)
- Daniel Bodansky, The United Nations Framework Convention on Climate Change: A Commentary, Yale J. Int. Law 18:451 (1993)

== Rankings ==
The journal was ranked second among international law reviews in the 2007 ExpressO Guide to Top Law Reviews based on the number of manuscripts received.

== Events ==
In collaboration with Opinio Juris, occasional online symposia centering on scholarly conversations on articles published in the journal are organized. In collaboration with the Forum on the Practice of International Law, the journal periodically convenes workshops and presentations on various topics. Some recent events are:

- Symposium: International Trade in the Trump Era (2019)
- The "New" New Haven School (2007)
- Nation Building in the Middle East (2005)
- Reflections on the International Court of Justice's Oil Platforms Decision (2004)
- Current Pressures on International Humanitarian Law (2003)
- Reflections on the International Court of Justice’s LaGrand Decision (2002)
- Realistic Idealism in International Law, a conference in honor of W. Michael Reisman. Selected proceedings from this conference were published in the Summer 2009 issue.
