= Third World approaches to international law =

Political movement

Third World approaches to international law (TWAIL) is a critical school of international legal scholarship and an intellectual and political movement. It is a "broad dialectic opposition to international law", which perceives international law as facilitating the continuing exploitation of the Third World through subordination to the West. TWAIL scholars seek to change what they identify as international law's oppressive aspects through the re-examination of the colonial foundations of international law.

== History ==
=== Early origins (Generation I) ===
TWAIL was inspired by the decolonization movements that occurred after World War II in Latin America, Africa, and Asia. Symbolically, the conference held in Bandung, Indonesia, in 1955 is seen as the birthplace of TWAIL, as it was the first attempt by African and Asian states to create a coalition to address the issues specific to the Third World. TWAIL came about to address the material and ethical concerns as well as hardships of the Third World.

=== New age movement (Generation II) ===
The study of TWAIL and its organization originated from a group of Harvard Law School graduate students in 1996. Subsequent to a conference regarding post-colonialism, critical race theory and law and development studies held at Harvard Law School in December 1995, graduate students held a meeting to analyze the viability of creating third world approaches to international law. TWAIL scholars have subsequently held conferences at various universities:

- Harvard Law School, 1997
- Osgoode Hall Law School, 2001
- Albany Law School, 2007
- University of British Columbia, 2008
- Université Paris 1 Panthéon-Sorbonne, 2010
- University of Oregon Law School, 2011
- American University in Cairo, 2015
- Faculty of Law, University of Colombo, 2017
- Faculty of Law, National University of Singapore, 2018
- UCLA School of Law, 2019

== Objectives ==
TWAIL's main objectives include:

- Developing an understanding as to how international law perpetuates the subordination of non-Europeans to Europeans through international legal norms;
- Creating opportunities for Third World participation in international law;
- Proposing an alternative mechanism of international law that coexists with other critiques of the neoliberal approach to international law;
- Eradicating underdevelopment of the Third World through scholarship, policy, and politics; and
- Understanding and engaging Third World scholarship in the analysis of international law.

== Concepts ==
=== Third World ===
According to TWAIL scholars, the Third World is a group of states which are politically, economically, and culturally diverse, but are simultaneously united in their common history of colonialism. TWAIL emphasizes that even after the end of the Cold War, the Third World is still a political reality. Some TWAIL scholars believe this distinction to be even more alive today, due to the aggregation of diversification of states based on economic development. They underline that the maintenance of the unity of the Third World is crucial in combating the continuing domination of the First World and that the term has no pejorative connotation. The First World is considered to be the group of states engaged in imperial practices and which continue to dominate global politics and economics.

=== Approaches ===
TWAIL reconsiders the history and development of international law and highlights the colonial legacy inherent in it. TWAIL reevaluates the power relationships of the current world order to eradicate the racial hierarchy and oppression present in international law. Although the goal is common, the methods employed to effect those changes vary. Hence, TWAIL is a diverse and ‘coalitionary movement’ – its scholars use different methodologies like Marxism, feminism and critical race theory. Therefore, there is no elaborate common TWAIL doctrine, but all TWAIL scholars are nevertheless united in their struggle for the greater involvement of Third World peoples in international law.

=== International Law ===
TWAIL scholars underline that international law was created during the colonial era and that it was used to legitimize the global processes of marginalization and domination of the colonized people by Western powers. They refuse to accept the universal character of the international legal system, as it emerged solely from the European and Christian tradition. In contrast, Third World countries were assimilated by force into the international legal system, which does not reflect their diverse heritage. TWAIL scholars reject the idea that after the end of World War II international law has moved on from its imperialistic origins. Although the system appears to be legitimized by recognizing human rights and the right to self-determination, TWAIL scholars believe that international law is still a tool of oppression and that decolonization processes were merely illusory. Amongst the modern forms of domination, TWAIL scholars include:

- The limitation of the Third World states’ sovereignty through transferring their autonomous powers to international institutions controlled by the First World
- The arbitrary application of the humanitarian intervention
- The internationalization of proprietary rights

TWAI scholars also emphasizes the inability of Third World leaders to secure the interests of their people and their failed opposition to the First World hegemony, which further hinders the struggle for the liberation of Third World peoples. However, TWAIL highlights that some concepts in international law simultaneously serve as both an instrument of oppression and emancipation – like the international human rights regime, which not only justifies the internationalization of property rights but also the protection of peoples’ freedoms. Hence TWAIL scholars recognize that some elements of the system need to be preserved.

== Scholars ==
TWAIL is not a uniform school of thought and TWAIL scholars do not take a unanimous stance. Some of them are more reconstructionist while others are more oppositional in their approach. Nevertheless, the scholars, in a decentralized network, share a common concern for the Third World. Some of them teach TWAIL courses at various universities around the world.

=== First Generation ===
- R.P. Anand
- Upendra Baxi
- Mohammed Bedjaoui
- Keba M'baye
- Christopher Weeramantry
- Georges Abi-Saab

=== Second Generation ===
- Antony Anghie
- Bhupinder Chimni
- Makau Wa Mutua
- Obiora Chinedu Okafor
- Sylvia Tamale
- Michael Fakhri

== Criticism ==
TWAIL scholars are sometimes accused of having a nihilistic approach in that their rejection of global norms on the basis of individual differences denies meaningful collective progression. David P. Fidler, Jose Alvarez and Naz K. Modirzadeh criticize TWAIL for offering no positive agenda for action or reform in international law and relations. Alvarez uses the example of the genocide in Sudan and TWAIL scholars' refusal to subscribe to the lobbying of the Security Council to take the desired action in the case. Alvarez's own work contains many TWAIL-like themes and he has often been just as critical of certain liberal approaches to international law as TWAIL scholarship has been. Post-structuralist critiques of TWAIL assert that the argumentative logic of TWAIL ultimately operates according to the very conservative analytical framework it sets out to transcend.

Legal scholar Geraldo Vidigal stated that TWAIL itself started out as "Euro-American". Naz K. Modirzadeh has observed that "[t]he vast majority of TWAIL scholarship is produced and published in the Global North. Virtually all TWAIL gatherings have been organized and funded by Global North institutions, even in the rare event that they have physically taken place in the Global South."

In a 2020 study, the TWAIL movement was criticised in relation to it justifying civilizational colonialism in the sensitive areas of High Asia (a metaphoric categorisation) in which many areas were included like Kashmir, Hazara, Nuristan, Laghman, Azad Kashmir, Jammu, Himachal Pradesh, Ladakh, Gilgit Baltistan, Chitral, Western Tibet, Western Xinjiang, Badakhshan, Gorno Badakhshan, Fergana, Osh and Turkistan Region. These rich resource areas are surrounded by the five major mountainous systems of Tien Shan, Pamirs, Karakoram, Hindu Kush and Western Himalayas and the three main river systems of Amu Darya, Syr Darya and Indus. The work highlights the role of United States, China, Russia, UK, India, Pakistan, Afghanistan, Kazakhstan, Uzbekistan, Kyrgyzstan, Tajikistan, Turkey, Iran and other players involved in The New Great Game over who will dominate High Asia. The work criticises TWAILers for ignoring sensitive areas like these and further tries to explore Pan-High Asianism and High Asian Approaches to International Law (HAAIL) as the potential way forward for the region which can be sub-categorised into the Western Pahari, Greater Dardic, Trans-Himalayan, Badakhshan and Sogdiana Belts.

== See also ==
- Public international law
- Marxism
- Critical race theory
- Feminist theory
- Decolonization
- Human rights
- First World
- Third World
- History of public international law
- International legal theories
