= May 1933 =

Month of 1933

<<	May 1933					>>
Su	Mo	Tu	We	Th	Fr	Sa
	1	2	3	4	5	6
7	8	9	10	11	12	13
14	15	16	17	18	19	20
21	22	23	24	25	26	27
28	29	30	31

The following events occurred in May 1933:

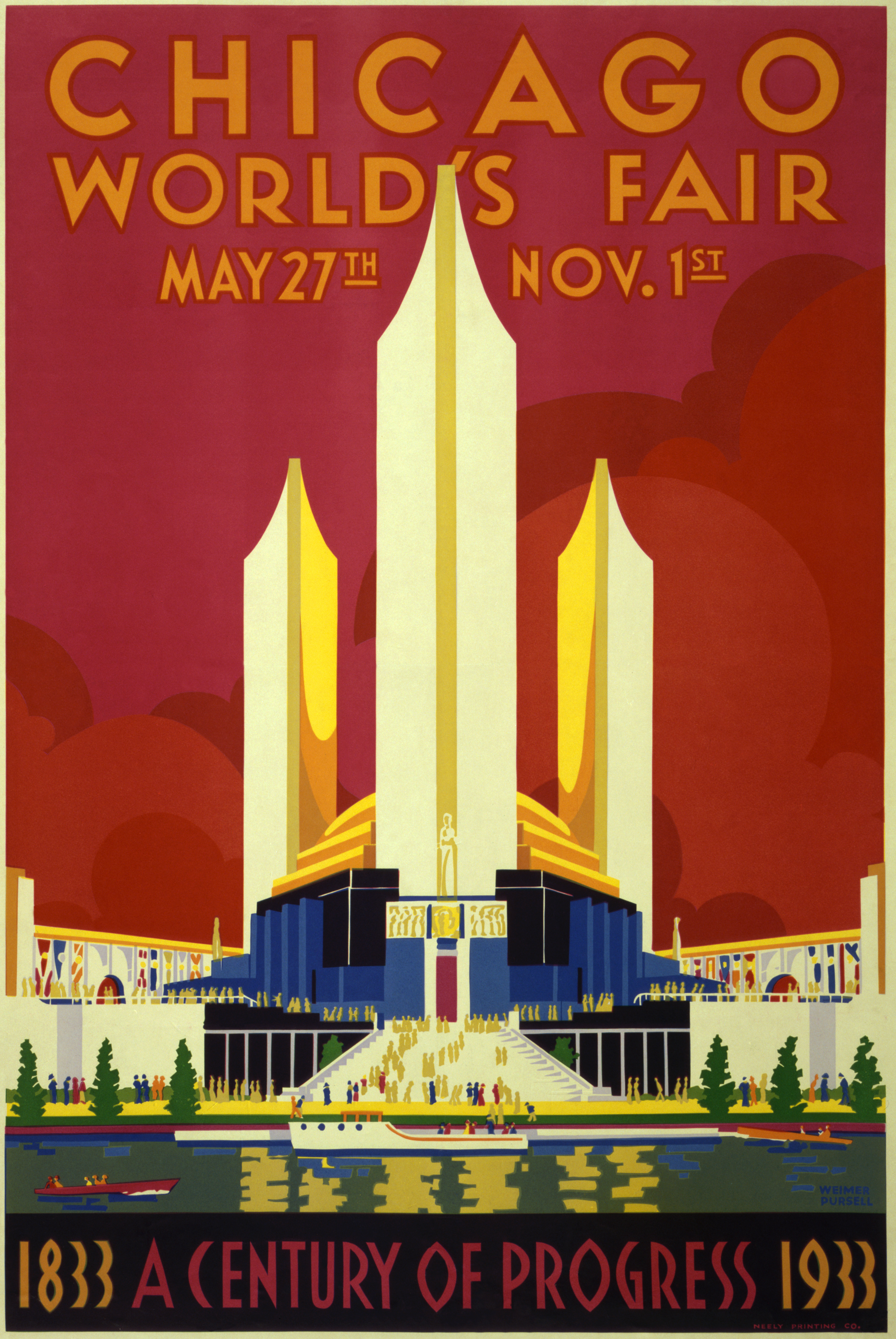
May 27, 1933: World's Fair opens in Chicago

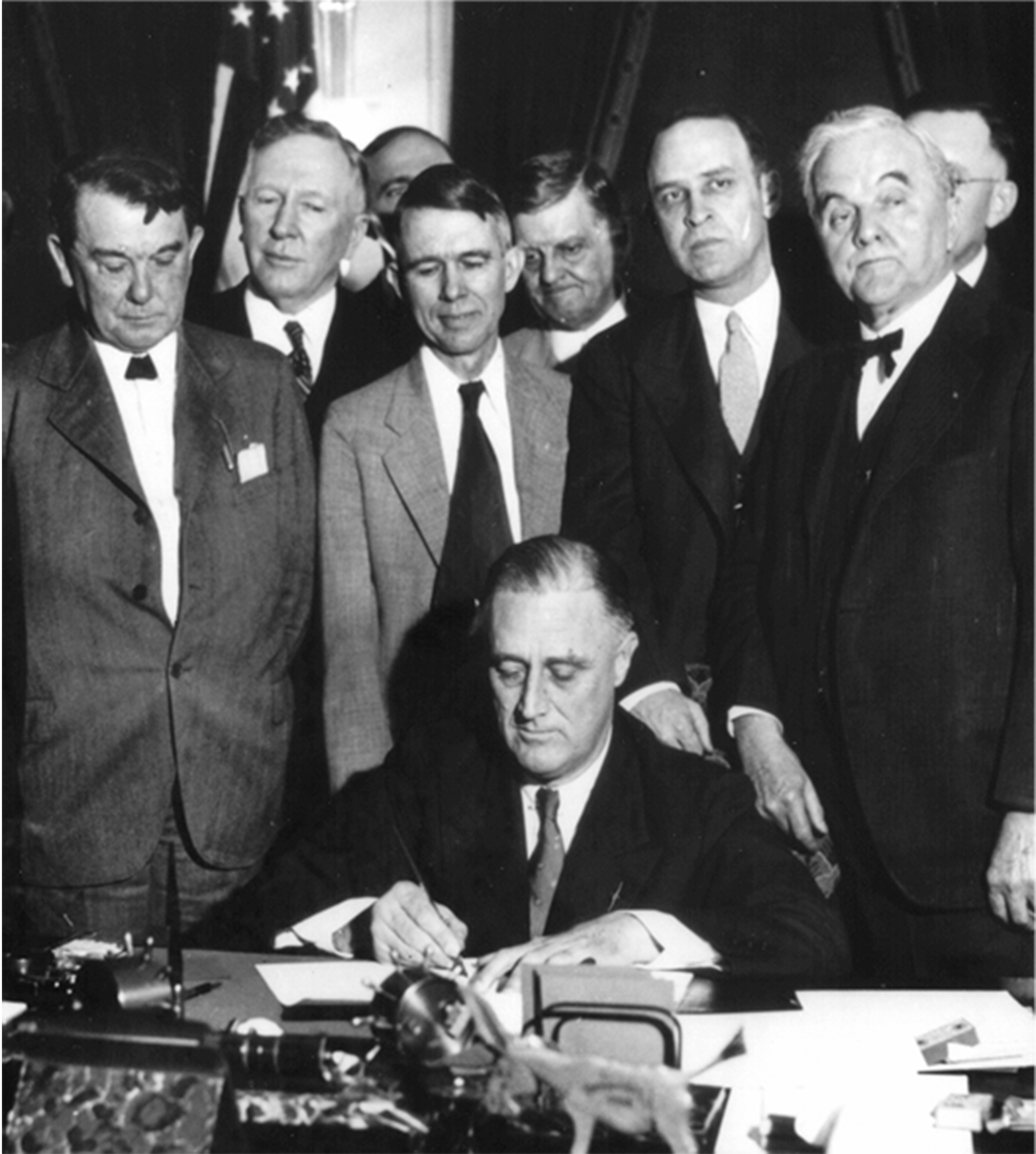
May 18, 1933: TVA Bill signed by FDR

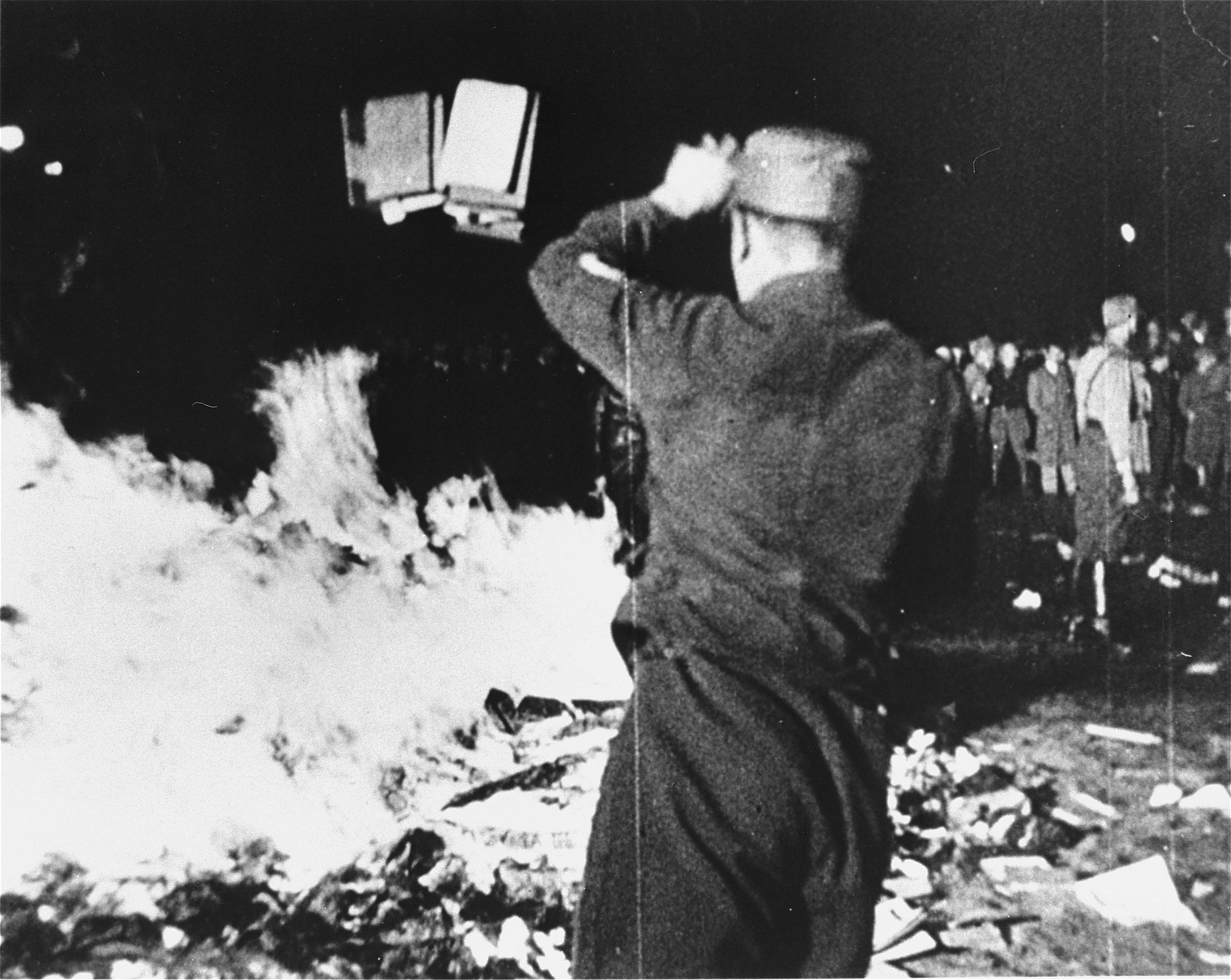
May 10, 1933: A member of the SA throws confiscated books into the bonfire during the public burning of "un-German" books on the Opernplatz in Berlin."

== May 1, 1933 (Monday) ==
- In the United States, tornadoes killed 71 people, including 55 in the city of Minden, Louisiana.

== May 2, 1933 (Tuesday) ==
- The legend of the Loch Ness Monster was born when the Inverness Courier, a newspaper in the nearby Scottish city, published a story entitled "Strange Spectacle on Loch Ness". As the Courier began reporting more sightings, other newspapers picked up the story, with international reporters coming to the Loch by October.
- Gleichschaltung: The day after the International Labor Day, Nazi Germany's Brown Shirts invaded the offices of trade unions, labor banks, consumer cooperatives and other "Marxist economic organizations" that had been affiliated with the Allgemeiner Deutscher Gewerkschaftsbund in cities across the nation.

== May 3, 1933 (Wednesday) ==
- In the Irish Free State, the Dáil Éireann (Ireland's parliament), abolished the Oath of Allegiance to the British Crown.
- Nellie Tayloe Ross, who had been the first woman to be elected Governor of an American state (Wyoming), became the first woman to be named director of the United States Mint. She served until 1953.
- Born:
  - James Brown, African-American musician known as "The Godfather of Soul", in Barnwell, South Carolina (d. 2006)
  - Steven Weinberg, American theoretical physicist, Nobel Prize laureate in 1979, in New York City. (d. 2021)

== May 4, 1933 (Thursday) ==
- Chinese author Ding Ling was kidnapped from her home in Shanghai by agents of the Nationalist Chinese government. Over the next three years, the leftist author was moved to various locations in Nanjing. In 1936 she escaped and joined with the Communist Red Army. Ironically, she would be jailed by the Communist Chinese government for her "right wing" views. In 1979 she would come back into favor with the Communist government, and would continue to be published until her death in 1986.
- Baseball pitcher Si Johnson of the Cincinnati Reds fell one hit short of a perfect game, a runner reaching base in the second inning, with no errors and no runs allowed in the 4–0 win over the Braves. Since the runner was tagged out while stealing, Johnson accomplished "27 up and 27 down". On May 18, Johnson would fall another hit short of a perfect game.

== May 5, 1933 (Friday) ==
- Bell Laboratories announced Karl Jansky's discovery of radio waves which appeared to be emanating from the center of the Milky Way galaxy. The news was reported on page one of the New York Times: "New Radio Waves Traced to Centre of the Milky Way"., introducing the world to the new science of radio astronomy.
- Died: Li Ching-Yuen, allegedly 256 years old, Chinese celebrity reported by the press to have been born in 1677.

== May 6, 1933 (Saturday) ==
- The Kentucky Derby horse race was won by jockey Donald Meade, riding Brokers Tip, finishing ahead of Herb Fisher on Head Play. Meade and Fisher literally fought each other on the way to the finish line, as photographs showed Meade grabbing Fisher's shoulder, and Fisher pulling on the saddle of Meade's horse, and both continued to fight after the race. Brokers Tip's victory was upheld, though both jockeys were suspended for unsportsmanlike conduct.
- In a prelude to mass book burnings in Germany, a gang of morally outraged students destroyed the work of Magnus Hirschfeld, burning the contents of the Institut für Sexualwissenschaft (Institute of Sex Research) in Berlin. Hirschfeld was out of the country at the time and would never return to Germany. He died in 1935 at age 67.
- Huddersfield defeated Warrington 21–17 to win the Challenge Cup of Rugby League before 41,874 at Wembley Stadium.

== May 7, 1933 (Sunday) ==
- U.S. President Roosevelt gave his second nationally broadcast radio speech. In a press release, CBS radio executive Harry C. Butcher coined the term "fireside chat" for the President's addresses.
- Born:
  - Johnny Unitas, American football star, in Pittsburgh (d. 2002)
  - Nexhmije Pagarusha, Albanian-Yugoslavian singer and actress, in Pagaruša (d. 2020).

== May 8, 1933 (Monday) ==
- After the number of inmates at prison camps, penal colonies and gulags in the Soviet Union escalated, Joseph Stalin signed a secret instruction to halt "unwarranted mass arrests in the countryside". The problem, the memo said, was that "Everyone who feels like it, including people who, strictly speaking, have no right to do so, is out arresting people." Over the next two months, almost half of the prisoners (360,000) were released.
- Mahatma Gandhi began a fast against untouchability.

== May 9, 1933 (Tuesday) ==
- The Nazi Party presented its plan for a German national church, based in Wittenberg, that would be limited to "Aryan Christians" and would recognize the sovereignty of the Nazi state.
- British scholar A. E. Housman gave what Yale professor William Lyon Phelps called "the most famous lecture delivered in the twentieth century". "The Name and Nature of Poetry" was delivered at the University of Cambridge.
- Mural painter Diego Rivera halted work on Man at the Crossroads, commissioned for the Rockefeller Center in New York, after observers criticized his addition of Communist symbolism, including the face of Vladimir Lenin. The mural would be destroyed in February 1934.
- Born: Jessica Steele, English romance novelist, in Royal Leamington Spa, Warwickshire (d. 2020)

== May 10, 1933 (Wednesday) ==
- The National Socialist German Students' League enthusiastically carried out the destruction of "un-German books" on college campuses across Germany.
- In the first official declaration of war by one nation against another since 1918, Paraguay's legislature voted to attack neighboring Bolivia. At Asunción, Paraguay's President Eusebio Ayala signed the measure. Bolivia and Paraguay had been fighting since June 15, 1932, when Bolivia attacked the Paraguayan town of Pitiantuia, in a dispute over the 100,000 square mile territory of the Gran Chaco. The Chaco War, in progress since 1932, would last until 1935, leaving over 100,000 people (at least 57,000 Bolivians and 43,000 Paraguayans) dead and a costly Paraguayan victory.
- Born: Barbara Taylor Bradford, British suspense novelist, in Leeds (d. 2024)
- Died: Sam Marx, 73, unsuccessful tailor and door-to-door salesman, father of the five Marx Brothers

== May 11, 1933 (Thursday) ==
- As troops from Japan continued marching through China toward Beijing (called Pei-p'ing at that time), a Japanese bomber flew over the city and dropped handbills with the warning "Cease opposing the Japanese and Manchukuans. Break away from Marshal Chiang Kai-shek or tragedy ... will occur in Peiping and Tientsin." Chinese troops, defending a pass in the Great Wall, had been annihilated earlier in the week.
- Tornadoes struck the American states Tennessee and Kentucky, leaving 54 people dead in the seventh major storm series in two months.
- Saud bin Abdul Aziz was proclaimed Crown Prince of Saudi Arabia in an elaborate Bay'ah ceremony. King Saud would succeed to the throne in 1953 upon the death of his father, Ibn Saud, before the royal family withdrew the Bay'ah in 1964.
- Born:
  - Louis Farrakhan, Muslim African-American leader of the Nation of Islam organization, as Louis Eugene Wolcott in the Bronx
  - Mychal Judge, Roman Catholic chaplain of the Fire Department of New York, and the first FDNY casualty on September 11, 2001; in Brooklyn.

== May 12, 1933 (Friday) ==
- The Agricultural Adjustment Act was signed into law by U.S. President Roosevelt, giving the federal government the power to raise farm prices and to provide relief on farm mortgage foreclosures. Also known as the "Wagner Act", the bill provided $500 million for farm relief. Signed on the same day was the Federal Emergency Relief Act, which would eventually spend four billion dollars to create job programs for unemployed American workers.
- Born Andrei Voznesensky, Soviet and Russian poet (d. 2010).

== May 13, 1933 (Saturday) ==
- Plans to name the massive dam over the Colorado River after the unpopular recent American President Herbert Hoover, were cancelled by U.S. Secretary of the Interior Harold L. Ickes, after which the construction project was referred to as Boulder Dam. A 1947 act of Congress would change the name of the completed structure back to Hoover Dam.
- Died: Ernest Torrence, 54, Scottish actor

== May 14, 1933 (Sunday) ==
- The American Rocket Society (then called the American Interplanetary Society) made its first successful launch of a liquid-propellant rocket, firing from the area of Great Kills, Staten Island in New York City. Rocket 2 reached an altitude of 250 feet (76 meters) propelled by gasoline, but its liquid oxygen fuel failed to ignite.
- The League of Nations affirmed the historic neutrality of Switzerland, by adopting a resolution to that effect.
- Born: Siân Phillips, British actress, in Gwaun-Cae-Gurwen, Wales.

== May 15, 1933 (Monday) ==
- Chancellor Hitler informed the chief representative of German Kaiser Wilhelm II that the monarchy would not be restored in the foreseeable future. Friedrich von Berg's meeting with Hitler had been arranged by President Hindenburg. Hitler told von Berg that restoration of the House of Hohenzollern would not happen during Hitler's lifetime, if at all. Hitler would outlive Kaiser Wilhelm by slightly less than four years.
- An 11-year-old boy set fire to paper inside a garage, causing a blaze that destroyed 239 buildings in the American city of Auburn, Maine, which left 1,500 people homeless. Renaude Code confessed to setting the blaze on May 20.
- Died:
  - Hermann von François, 77, German general and World War I hero
  - Rocco Belcastro, 25, mob enforcer.

== May 16, 1933 (Tuesday) ==
- President Roosevelt outlined his "Program for World Security", asking 54 nations to enter into "a solemn and definite pact of non-aggression" and to abandon offensive weapons of war and to unite for peace and economic recovery.
- Nobel Prize-winning physicist Max Planck, President of the Kaiser Wilhelm Society, met with Adolf Hitler in an unsuccessful attempt to keep Planck's Jewish colleagues from being dismissed from their jobs. Planck later stated that Hitler informed him: "Jews are all Communists and they are the enemy I am fighting against. A Jew is a Jew. All Jews hang together like burrs."
- Died:
  - John Henry Mackay, 69, German writer and anarchist
  - Lady Cynthia Mosley, 34, former British MP and wife of fascist Oswald Mosley
  - John Grier Hibben, 62, former President of Princeton University and philosopher.

== May 17, 1933 (Wednesday) ==
- Germany's Chancellor Hitler endorsed U.S. President Roosevelt's world disarmament proposal, and demanded a revision of the 1919 Versailles Treaty.
- The United States News published its first issue as a newspaper weekly, after a 1926 attempt as the United States Daily. On January 16, 1948, it would merge with the magazine World Report (launched in 1946) as the weekly newsmagazine U.S. News & World Report.
- The prime-time American radio series One Man's Family premiered nationwide on the NBC Red Network, after nine months on the network's West Coast affiliates. The popular drama would remain a half-hour program for 17 years, then a 15-minute show after June 5, 1950, then an afternoon show after July 1, 1955, finally ending on April 24, 1959.
- Article 25 of the Republic of Spain's Constitution, the "Law of Religious Confessions and Congregations", went into effect, placing control of the Roman Catholic Church in Spain in the hands of the government, nationalizing church property, and banning church schools.
- Vidkun Quisling and Johan Bernhard Hjort formed The Nasjonal Samling (the National-Socialist Party) of Norway, based on Germany's National Socialist (Nazi Party). Quisling, whose name would become a synonym for a traitor, would pave the way for Germany's occupation of Norway during World War II.
- The romantic drama film I Cover the Waterfront starring Ben Lyon, Claudette Colbert and Ernest Torrence (in his final role) was released.

== May 18, 1933 (Thursday) ==
- In one of the most comprehensive New Deal programs, President Roosevelt signed into law the Norris-Hill bill, creating the Tennessee Valley Authority. A day earlier, the U.S. House of Representatives had voted 259–112 to approve the version passed by the Senate. The TVA brought cheap electrical power to the rural southern United States and controlled flooding by building dams along the Tennessee River.
- Born:
  - H. D. Deve Gowda, 11th Prime Minister of India (1996–1997), in Haradanahalli
  - Carroll Hardy, American athlete in professional baseball and football; in Sturgis, South Dakota (d. 2020).

== May 19, 1933 (Friday) ==
- The bombing of a crowded railway station at Tientsin killed more than 100 people in the Chinese city.
- The last gold American coins minted, the twenty-dollar 1933 Double Eagle series, were delivered to the U.S. Mint to be melted. Most of the coins were never put into circulation but were melted down, but at least 20 were stolen and remained in existence. One of the coins would sell at a 2002 auction for $7,590,020.
- Born:
  - Edward de Bono, Maltese proponent of lateral thinking (d. 2021).
  - Tom Feelings, African-American children's illustrator, in Brooklyn (d. 2003).

== May 20, 1933 (Saturday) ==
Austrian fascist Kruckenkreuz

German Nazi flag with swastika

- Austrian Chancellor Engelbert Dollfuss established the Vaterlandische Front (Fatherland Front), unifying right-wing political parties into a single fascist organization. Adapting a symbol to rival the German Nazi Party and its Austrian branch, the VF used as its symbol "a straightened-up version of the swastika called the 'Kruckenkreuz'".
- Following its May 11 warning to the citizens of Beijing, Japan sent eleven bombers over China's capital. Again, no bombs were dropped, only leaflets, reminding the populace that Japan could, and would, destroy Beijing if the government continued to oppose Japanese occupation of northeast China.
- Turkish Airlines was established as Turkish State Airlines (Devlet Hava Yolları) by the Ministry of National Defense

== May 21, 1933 (Sunday) ==
- George Wilson Becton, the controversial 43-year-old African-American evangelist, was murdered by two white gunmen as he and aides left a Philadelphia church after he preached a sermon there.
- Born:
  - G. S. Maddala, Indian econometrics pioneer (d. 1999)
  - Maurice André, French trumpeter, in Alès (d. 2012)
  - Erazim Kohák, Czech philosopher, in Prague (d. 2020).

== May 22, 1933 (Monday) ==
- A repeat of the 1932 occupation of Washington, D.C., by the Bonus Army, was peacefully averted. Most of the group of 2,800 World War I veterans, who had been seeking early redemption of bonuses due them in 1945, accepted jobs with the Civilian Conservation Corps as the deadline for the offer expired. The marchers' encampment at Fort Hunt, Virginia became a CCC forestry camp on May 22, and the government paid for transportation home for those persons who chose not to stay.
- Tsengeltiin Jigjidjav, formerly the Prime Minister of Mongolia (1930–32) and the nation's Minister of Trade, was shot to death at his home. He was posthumously accused by the Communist Party of being a counterrevolutionary.
- John Dillinger was paroled from the Indiana State Prison after serving 8 1/2 years of a 20-year sentence for armed robbery of a store. After two months he began robbing banks across the Midwest United States.
- Born:
  - Chen Jingrun, Chinese mathematician, in Fuzhou (d. 1996)
  - Arnold Lobel, American author of juvenile literature (d. 1987).
- Died: Sándor Ferenczi, 59, Hungarian psychoanalyst.

== May 23, 1933 (Tuesday) ==
- J. P. Morgan, Jr. testified before a U.S. Senate subcommittee that he and the other partners in J.P. Morgan & Co. had paid no income taxes in 1931 or 1932. The multi-millionaires had broken no laws, deducting capital losses from their substantial annual incomes earned, but public outrage led to revisions of the taxation law.
- Born:
  - Joan Collins, British-born American stage, film and TV actress (Dynasty), in Paddington
  - Seabiscuit, American racehorse, near Paris, Kentucky (d. 1947).

== May 24, 1933 (Wednesday) ==
- The U.S. Senate impeachment trial of District Judge Harold Louderback concluded with his acquittal on all five counts. On Count V, the Senate voted 45–34 to convict him, nine votes short of the 2/3rds majority needed for his removal from office.
- William Henry Thompson, 79, was appointed U.S. Senator for the state of Nebraska, to fill the term of Robert B. Howell, who had died.
- Born: Marian Engel, Canadian author, in Toronto (d. 1985).
- Died:
  - Rosslyn Wemyss 69, British Admiral of the Fleet
  - John Froelich, 84, American inventor.

== May 25, 1933 (Thursday) ==
- The Great Marpole Midden was recognized as a National Historic Site of Canada.
- Died: Percy C. Mather, 50, British Protestant missionary to China.

== May 26, 1933 (Friday) ==
- Germany decreed a law to permit human sterilization, to further the Nazi eugenics program and to build a "master race".
- Born: Edward Whittemore, American novelist and CIA agent, in Manchester, New Hampshire (d. 1995).
- Died: Jimmie Rodgers, 35, American musician sometimes called "The Father of Country Music".

== May 27, 1933 (Saturday) ==
- Another piece of New Deal legislation, the Federal Securities Act was signed into law, requiring the registration of American securities with the Federal Trade Commission.
- The Century of Progress, the unofficial name for the 1933 World's Fair, opened in the city of Chicago.
- Walt Disney's classic Silly Symphony cartoon The Three Little Pigs was first released.

== May 28, 1933 (Sunday) ==
- Parliamentary elections were held in the Free City of Danzig; the Nazi Party won a majority.
- Born: Helmuth Rilling, German chorus conductor, in Stuttgart. (d.2026)

== May 29, 1933 (Monday) ==
- The Standard Oil Company of California (now Chevron Corporation) signed an agreement with Saudi Arabia, to develop that nation's oil reserves for sixty years. Oil would be discovered in 1938, the first oil would be exported in 1939, and Saudi Arabia would become the world's largest oil producer.
- Young Corbett III lost the world welterweight boxing title to Jimmy McLarnin after a three-month reign. The Los Angeles bout ended in the first round after McLarnin knocked Corbett down three times in less than three minutes.
- Speaking against repeal of the gold standard in a debate in the U.S. House of Representatives, Congressman Louis T. McFadden (R-Pa.) delivered a speech "alleging a Jewish conspiracy in terms that went far beyond the conventional anti-Semitism of the day". "The Gentiles have slips of paper while the Jews have the gold", said McFadden, adding, "This country has fallen into the hands of the international money changers." McFadden would lead the crusade against American Jews until his death three years later.
- Harvey Bailey, "The Dean of American Bank Robbers", led a prison break from the Kansas State Penitentiary at Lansing. He would be recaptured and sentenced to life in federal prison, but would be released in 1964 and live until 1979.
- The Mahatma Gandhi ended his fast after 21 days.

== May 30, 1933 (Tuesday) ==
- Louis Meyer won the Indianapolis 500, but the race was marred by the deaths of three drivers and two riding mechanics. Before the race started, Bill Denver and his riding mechanic Bob Hurst were killed on a warm-up lap in preparation for a qualifying run. On the 79th lap, Mark Billman skidded, was thrown from the car, and pinned between the left front wheel and the surrounding track. His left arm was torn off, both legs were broken and he had internal injuries. He died an hour later. On the 132nd lap, Lester Spangler and his riding mechanic "Monk" Jordan were killed when the car of Malcolm Fox rolled into Spangler's path and Spangler's car hit head on with Fox's car at 100 miles per hour (160 km/h), rolled over, and threw both men out.

== May 31, 1933 (Wednesday) ==
- The Tanggu Truce was signed by the Republic of China and the Empire of Japan. Threatened with destruction, China surrendered its territory in Manchuria to the Japanese puppet state of Manchukuo, agreed to allow Japanese troops to permanently occupy its territory north of the Great Wall of China, and pulled its troops away from a "demilitarized zone" extending 100 kilometers south of the Wall.
