= Tai-Heng Cheng =

Singaporean legal scholar and lawyer

Tai-Heng Cheng is a Singaporean legal scholar, lawyer, and international arbitrator based in New York City.

Cheng is the author of the book When International Law Works: Realistic Idealism After 9/11 and the Global Recession (Oxford University Press 2011). His other works include State Succession and Commercial Obligations (Transnational Publishers, 2006), a post-Cold War treatise on how to manage international contracts, loans and commercial treaties when state succession or regime change occur.

== Professional background ==
Cheng holds Doctor of the Science of Law and Master of Laws degrees from Yale Law School, where he was Howard M. Hotzmann Fellow for International Law and studied under Professor W. Michael Reisman. He also holds a Bachelor of Arts in law degree with First Class Honors from Oxford University, where he was an Oxford University Scholar. He also received a Master of Arts degree from Oxford University in 2004 and a Graduate Diploma in Singapore Law from the National University of Singapore in 2001.

Cheng is an elected member of the American Law Institute, and serves on its Members Consultative Committees that assist in the preparation of the Restatement (Third) of the U.S. Law of International Commercial Arbitration, and the Principles of World Trade Organization Law. He is an elected member of the Executive Council of the American Society of International Law (ASIL) and chairs its Scholarship Awards Committee. He was co-chair of the 2011 ASIL Annual Meeting. He is also a member of the Academic Council of the Institute for Transnational Arbitration (ITA) and co-chair of the 2012 ITA Annual Arbitration Workshop in Dallas, Texas. He is Honorary Fellow of the Foreign Policy Association, Fellow of the American Bar Foundation, and a founding member of the Arbitration Club of New York.

He has served as arbitrator, chair, expert, amicus curiae, and counsel in ICSID, UNCITRAL, ICDR, ICC, SCC, and JAMS arbitrations, and in U.S. and Canadian court proceedings. He is a member of the panels of neutrals of the ICDR, CPR, and HKIAC. He has advised the United Nations Transitional Administration in East Timor and the Republic of Kosovo on comparative and international law issues, including investment treaties. He was also previously appointed Senior Officer of the Singapore Police Force, where he gave advice on legal issues and counter terrorism.

He was previously associated with the New York law firm Simpson Thacher & Bartlett, where he represented AIG, BlackRock, Bechtel, General Electric, Weight Watchers, and Toys 'R' Us. He has been admitted to the Bars of New York State; the U.S. District Courts for the Southern, Eastern, and Western Districts of New York; and the U.S. Court of Appeals for the Second Circuit.

Cheng has served as vice president of the American Society of International Law and is an elected fellow of the College of Commercial Arbitrators, The American Law Institute, and the Foreign Policy Association. He is a trustee of The Frick Collection in New York and sits on the boards of the Smithsonian Institution’s National Museum of Asian Art and the Singapore Management University School of Law.

In 2005, Turkish Daily News reported his impressions from a fact finding mission to Turkey where he met with military generals, senior elected representatives, religious leaders and dissidents. In 2006, the National Law Journal and New York Law Journal reported that he led an international fact finding mission to Iran, where he met with Massoumeh Ebtekar, Iran's first woman Vice President and former spokesperson for the hostage takers of the U.S. embassy, mullahs, ambassadors, professors, civil society reformers and UN officials in Tehran.

== Publications ==
=== Books ===
When International Law Works: Realistic Idealism After 9/11 and the Global Recession (Oxford University Press 2011)
State Succession and Commercial Obligations (Transnational Publishers 2006)

=== Articles ===
Why New States Accept Old Obligations, 2011 U. Ill. L. Rev. 1 (2011);
Developing Narratives in International Investment Law, 8 Santa Clara J. Int' L. (2011);
Making International Law Without Agreeing What It Is, 10 Wash. U. Glob. Stud. L. Rev. (2011);
Shaping an Obama Doctrine of Preemptive Force, 82 Temp. L. Rev. 737 (2009);
Reasons and Reasoning in Investment Treaty Arbitration, 32 Suffolk Transnat’l L. Rev. 409 (2009);
The Universal Declaration of Human Rights at Sixty: Is it Still Right for the United States?, 41 Cornell Int'l L.J. 251 (2008);
Renegotiating the Odious Debt Doctrine, 70 Law & Contemp. Probs. 7 (2007);
Precedent and Control in Investment Treaty Arbitration, 30 Fordham Int'l L.J. 1014 (2007);
Power, Norms, and International Intellectual Property Law, 28 Mich. J. Int'l L. 109 (2006);
Power, Authority and International Investment Law, 20 Am. U. Int’l L. Rev. 465 (2005);
The Central Case Approach to Human Rights, 13 Pac. Rim L. & Pol’y J. 257 (2004)

=== Book Chapters and Other Scholarship ===
International Arbitration, in Judicial Benchbook on International Law, D. Amann ed. (2011);
Transnational Dispute Management Special Edition: International Arbitration in China, T. Cheng & P. Thorp eds. (2011);
Positivism, New Haven Jurisprudence and the Fragmentation of International Law, in Essays in Honor of Thomas Walde, T. Weiler ed. (2010);
State Succession and Commercial Obligations: Lessons from Kosovo, in Essays in Honor of W. michael Reisman, M. Arsanjani et al. eds. (2010);
Law on Loan: Legal Reconstruction after Armed Conflict, in Corporate Social Responsibility in Zones of Conflict, N. Turner ed. (2010);
Reflections on Culture in Mediation-Arbitration, in Contemporary Issues in International Arbitration and Mediation, A. Robine ed. (2010);
A Renaissance Career in International Law, in 2009-2010 ASIL Careers in International Law (2009);
Reframing Iran: A View from the Field, with P. Huntington & G. Billard (2007)
