= R. P. Anand =

Legal scholar

Ram Prakash Anand (1933–2011) was an international legal scholar and a pioneer of Third World approaches to international law.

== Education ==
Anand received an LL.M. in international law with distinction from Delhi University in 1957. He attended Yale Law School as a Sterling Fellow, receiving an LL.M. in 1962 and a J.S.D. in 1964.

== Career ==
Anand wrote extensively on the law of the sea, international adjudication, the birth of states, and the sovereign equality of states, authoring and editing over 20 books and nearly 100 articles in leading journals of international law. He was invited to give a lecture on "Sovereign Equality of States in International Law" at the prestigious Hague Academy of International Law. He was elected an Associate Member of the Institute de Droit International.

He was a pioneer of Third World approaches to international law, later considered to be a scholar of the TWAIL I movement. In the words of Professor Sornarajah, "[i]t was he who...first identified international law as based on European power and saw the need to rearticulate it to reflect the interests of the newly independent peoples of Asia and Africa." Professors B. S. Chimni and Antony Anghie, leading scholars of international law and third-world approaches to international law, have said that Anand's work, in particular his book the New States and International Law, significantly influenced their own scholarship. Anand's work was regularly reviewed and cited by leading scholars in the field of international law.

In 1973, he was appointed as a consultant to the United Nations Secretary-General on the Law of the Sea. He was one of the founders of the Asian Society of International Law and served as president of the Indian Society of International Law.

In the words of Judge Xue Hanquin of the International Court of Justice, he was "one of the most prominent international lawyers in India and Asia" who made significant contributions to the improvement and development of international law At the time of his death, he was a Professor Emeritus of International Law at Jawaharlal Nehru University, New Delhi. Following his death in 2011, the Asian Society of International Law convened an event to commemorate his life and the impact of his work.

== Publications ==
=== Books ===
- New States and International Law (1972, 2008)
- Studies in International Law and History: An Asian Perspective (2004)
- International Law and Developing Countries: Confrontation or Cooperation? (1987)
- Origin and Development of the Law of the Sea (1983)
- Law of the Sea: Caracas and Beyond (1980)
- Legal Régime of the Sea-Bed and the Developing Countries (1975)
- International Courts and Contemporary Conflicts (1974)
- Asian States and the Development of a Universal International Law (1972)
- Studies in International Adjudication (1969)
- Compulsory Jurisdiction of the International Court of Justice (1961)

=== Articles ===
- "The Formation of International Organizations and India: A History" (2010)
- "The United States and the World Court" (1964)
