= Regional integration law =

Law of regional organisations and their impact on domestic systems

Regional Integration Law is a branch of jurisprudence which seeks to analyze the growing impact of regional bodies such as the European Union and the North American Free Trade Agreement (NAFTA) on the national laws of the signatory states, especially in relation to public and private trade law. Another example is The East African Community (EAC) is a regional intergovernmental organization of 6 Partner States: the Republics of Burundi, Kenya, Rwanda, South Sudan, the United Republic of Tanzania, and the Republic of Uganda, with its headquarters in Arusha, Tanzania. Similar legal progression can be observed in other regions such as Central Asia where local laws and policies are heavily influenced by regional organizations. Regional Integration Law also refers to a generalized legal regime for a specific region.

== Central Asia Tech Law ==
Another distinct but relative field of jurisprudence is "Central Asia Tech Law". Central Asia Tech Law or CAT Law is a Legal Term coined by Ammar Younas in 2019. The Central Asia Tech Law aims at reinforcing the legal principles and rule of law in the countries of Central Asia in accordance with applicable international standards of technology regulations and by correlating with existing laws without compromising the legal sovereignty of Central Asian Law.

The subject matter of “Central Asia Tech Law” includes Technology Law and related fields such as Internet Law, IT Law, Digital Law, LegalTech, FinTech in all five countries of the region – Kazakhstan, Kyrgyzstan, Tajikistan, Turkmenistan and Uzbekistan.

This branch of law strives to promote glocalized legal mechanism to treat technology as per the demands of the Central Asian region and in line with the international standardization.
