= Georges Abi-Saab =

Egyptian lawyer and international law specialist (born 1933)

Georges Michel Abi-Saab (born June 9, 1933) is an Egyptian-American lawyer, professor of international law, and an international judge. He is well known for his defense of the interests of Third World countries in and within international law.

== Early life and education ==
Abi-Saab was born in Heliopolis. He graduated from Cairo University with a law degree in 1954, and went on to study law, economics, and political science at the Sorbonne, Harvard University (LL.M and L.D), the University of Cambridge, the University of Michigan (MA in economics), and Geneva's Graduate Institute of International Studies (PhD in political science). He also earned a diploma from the Hague Academy of International Law.

Abi-Saab held numerous visiting professorships, inter alia, at Harvard Law School, Tunis University, the University of Jordan, the University of the West Indies at St. Augustine, as well as the Rennert Distinguished Professorship at New York University School of Law, and the Henri Rolin Chair in Belgian Universities.

== Career ==
Georges Abi-Saab is Honorary Professor of International Law at the Graduate Institute of International and Development Studies in Geneva (having taught there from 1963 to 2000), Honorary Professor at Cairo University's Faculty of Law, and a Member of the Institute of International Law.

Professor Abi-Saab played a central role in the drafting of the Additional Protocol I, crafting the ultimately successful strategy to ensure the protections of international humanitarian law in wars of national liberation, a move that was strongly supported by the Third World, but which many Western nations (most obviously including colonial powers) resisted. He also served as consultant to the Secretary-General of the United Nations on matters including the New International Economic Order.

Professor Abi-Saab is a former two-time ad hoc Judge of the International Court of Justice, a former Judge of the Appeals Chamber of the International Criminal Tribunal for the former Yugoslavia (ICTY) and International Criminal Tribunal for Rwanda (ICTR), a former Commissioner of the United Nations Compensation Commission, and former Chairman of the Appellate Body of the World Trade Organization (his term ended in 2008).

He was awarded the 2017 Manley O. Hudson Medal of the American Society of International Law.

== Lectures ==
The International Judicial Function in the Lecture Series of the United Nations Audiovisual Library of International Law
