= February 1934 =

Month of 1934

<<	February 1934					>>
Su	Mo	Tu	We	Th	Fr	Sa
				1	2	3
4	5	6	7	8	9	10
11	12	13	14	15	16	17
18	19	20	21	22	23	24
25	26	27	28

The following events occurred in February 1934:

== February 1, 1934 (Thursday) ==
- Greece failed to deport the American fugitive businessman Samuel Insull by January 31 as pledged, leaving the condition of the case unclear. The United States government had the invalidated passport of Insull, who was reportedly ill, renewed in order to expedite his departure.

== February 2, 1934 (Friday) ==
- 100,000 farmers paraded in Vienna in support of Chancellor Dollfuss.
- Monarchist organizations were banned in Germany.
- In Needham, Massachusetts, Abraham Faber and Murton and Irving Millen, who had committed multiple robberies in Massachusetts during the previous six months, robbed the Needham Trust Company bank and took hostages. While escaping in a vehicle, the robbers shot and killed Patrolman Forbes A. McLeod of the Needham Police Department. The robbers entered Needham Heights, where they saw Patrolman Francis Oliver Haddock speaking with a uniformed firefighter at the fire station. Upon seeing two men in uniform, one of the robbers fired a machine gun, mortally wounding Haddock, the first person ever killed with a machine gun in Massachusetts. Faber and the Millens were subsequently convicted of murder and executed.
- Born: Khalil Ullah Khan, film actor, in Sylhet, British India (d. 2014)

== February 3, 1934 (Saturday) ==
- The German airline Lufthansa began air mail service to South America.
- French Prime Minister Édouard Daladier dismissed three cabinet ministers as well as Prefect of Police for Paris Jean Chiappe.
- 12,000 New York City taxicab drivers went on strike over the distribution of the proceeds from a discontinued five-cent tax on their fares.
- North of Sapulpa, Oklahoma, law enforcement officers approached a house where three armed robbers, Aussie Elliott, Eldon Wilson and Dupert Carolin, were hiding out. Sapulpa Chief of Police Thomas Jefferson Brumley was shot and killed as he approached the rear of the house by Carolin, who was hiding in the cellar. Other officers shot and killed Elliott and mortally wounded Wilson as they came out the front door. Carolin tried to escape and engaged in a running gun battle with the police, shooting and killing Sapulpa Officer Charles P. Lloyd and himself being shot to death by Lloyd and other officers.
- Died:
  - Aussie Elliott, 20, American bank robber (killed in shootout with police)
  - Francis Oliver Haddock, 41, American police officer

== February 4, 1934 (Sunday) ==
- Demonstrators in Paris began protesting against Daladier's removal of Jean Chiappe.
- Cuba adopted a new provisional constitution.

== February 5, 1934 (Monday) ==
- Mounted French troops clashed with thousands of angry war veterans enraged by the removal of popular police prefect Jean Chiappe.
- Lord Ashley filed suit for divorce from wife Sylvia, naming Douglas Fairbanks, Sr. as co-respondent.
- Rioting broke out in the streets of New York over the cab driver strike as strikers fought with police and burned independent cabs.
- In Paris, the Surrealist group led by André Breton put Salvador Dalí on "trial" for his troubling interest in Hitler as well as his painting The Enigma of William Tell. The painting depicted a deformed, semi-nude figure bearing the facial features of Vladimir Lenin, something that failed to amuse the Surrealists as many of them were communists. Dalí made a mockery of the proceedings by showing up with a thermometer in his mouth and seven thick sweaters on, which he proceeded to remove one at a time and put on again while taking his temperature. With one sweater left, Dalí told Breton that if he dreamed that night of the two of them making love to each other, he would not hesitate to paint the scene the next morning in great detail ("I don't advise it, my friend", was all Breton managed to say in response.) Then, stripping to the waist, Dalí knelt on the carpet and swore that he was no enemy of the proletariat, ending the bizarre event.
- Born: Hank Aaron, baseball player, in Mobile, Alabama (d. 2021)

== February 6, 1934 (Tuesday) ==
- 6 February 1934 crisis: French far-right leagues and other conservatives rioted on the Place de la Concorde near the French National Assembly. 17 were killed and over 2,000 wounded in the bloodiest Parisian rioting since the days of the Commune.
- In New York 500 striking cab drivers rioted on Broadway.

== February 7, 1934 (Wednesday) ==
- Daladier resigned as Prime Minister of France due to inability to control the rioting in Paris.
- Born: Eddie Fenech Adami, politician, in Birkirkara, Malta; Earl King, guitarist, singer and songwriter, in New Orleans, Louisiana (d. 2003)

== February 8, 1934 (Thursday) ==
- The merger of the Cunard and White Star shipping lines to form the Cunard-White Star Line was announced in Britain.
- The Partido Auténtico was founded in Cuba.
- Died: Ferenc Móra, 54, Hungarian writer and museologist; Verne Sankey, 43 or 44, American criminal (suicide in prison cell by hanging)

== February 9, 1934 (Friday) ==
- Greece, Turkey, Romania and Yugoslavia signed the Balkan Pact.
- Former president Gaston Doumergue became Prime Minister of France.
- The New York cab driver strike ended when the last strikers signed on to Mayor La Guardia's peace pact.
- The British historical film The Rise of Catherine the Great was released.
- Died: Lottie Deno, 89, American gambler

== February 10, 1934 (Saturday) ==
- 20 socialist leaders in Lithuania were arrested in Memel and charged with organizing a movement similar to the Nazi Party.
- Born: Fleur Adcock, poet and editor, in Auckland, New Zealand (d. 2024)

== February 11, 1934 (Sunday) ==
- The prison terms of 140,000 convicts in Japan were commuted. Death sentences were changed to life imprisonment and life sentences were cut down to 20 years, among other reductions. The birth in December of Crown Prince Akihito was one reason for the amnesty.
- The United Kingdom and Yemen signed a treaty of friendship.
- Canada defeated the United States 2-1 in overtime in the World Ice Hockey Championship Final.
- Born:
  - Tina Louise, actress and singer, in New York City; John Surtees, racer, in Tatsfield, Surrey, England
  - Manuel Noriega, Panamanian military officer, dictator of Panama, in Panama City (official date of birth) (d. 2017)

== February 12, 1934 (Monday) ==
- The Austrian Civil War, also known as the February Uprising, broke out between socialist and conservative-fascist forces.
- Leftists and trade unions in France staged a one-day general strike in protest against the resolution of the February 6 crisis. 2 were killed during rioting.
- Born: Anne Osborn Krueger, economist, in Endicott, New York; Bill Russell, basketball player, in West Monroe, Louisiana (d. 2022)

== February 13, 1934 (Tuesday) ==
- The Soviet steamship SS Chelyuskin was crushed by ice and sank near Kolyuchin Island in the Chukchi Sea. The 104 people on board escaped onto the ice and set up a makeshift camp where they would live for two months until their rescue.
- The dramatic play The Shining Hour premiered at the Booth Theatre on Broadway.
- Born: George Segal, actor and musician, in Great Neck, New York (d. 2021)
- Died: József Pusztai, 70, Slovene writer, journalist, teacher and cantor

== February 14, 1934 (Wednesday) ==
- The Reichsrat, the upper chamber of the German parliament, was abolished in Nazi Germany by the Law on the Abolition of the Reichsrat.
- Charles Ponzi was released from prison in Massachusetts after serving 11 years for swindling.
- Born: Michel Corboz, conductor, in Marsens, Switzerland (d. 2021); Florence Henderson, actress, in Dale, Indiana (d. 2016)

== February 15, 1934 (Thursday) ==
- The Greek government decided to allow Samuel Insull to remain in the country until his health improved.
- The German pacifist journalist Carl von Ossietzky was sent to Esterwegen concentration camp.
- The Social Democratic Party of Austria was banned.
- Born: Niklaus Wirth, computer scientist, in Winterthur, Switzerland (d. 2024)

== February 16, 1934 (Friday) ==
- The Austrian Civil War ended in victory for government forces, who began issuing and carrying out death sentences against the rebels by hanging. The total dead in four days of fighting was estimated at over 1,000.
- The Noël Coward stage musical Conversation Piece premiered at His Majesty's Theatre in London.
- Born: The Kalin Twins (Harold & Herbert), pop music duo, in Port Jervis, New York (d. 2005 and 2006, respectively)

== February 17, 1934 (Saturday) ==
- Britain, France and Italy released a joint statement guaranteeing Austria's "independence and integrity in accordance with the relevant treaties." A German spokesperson responded, "The prerequisite of independence is that people shall have a government which they themselves desire. It logically follows that independence is in danger if and when attempts are made to prevent people from having a government they want. Austria should have a government which has the nation behind it."
- Born: Alan Bates, actor, in Allestree, Derbyshire, England (d. 2003); Barry Humphries, actor and comedian, in Kew, Melbourne, Australia (d. 2023)
- Died: Albert I of Belgium, 58, King of the Belgians (mountaineering accident)

== February 18, 1934 (Sunday) ==
- Crown Prince Leopold returned from a skiing trip in the Alps upon the death of King Albert.
- Born:
  - Ronald F. Marryott, admiral, in Eddystone, Pennsylvania (d. 2005)
  - Paco Rabanne, Spanish Basque fashion designer, as Francisco Rabaneda Cuervo in Pasaia (d. 2023)

== February 19, 1934 (Monday) ==
- The body of King Albert of Belgium was brought to the royal palace in Brussels where it was to lie in state until Thursday.
- Died: Caleb Bradham, inventor of Pepsi, in New Bern, North Carolina (b. 1867)

== February 20, 1934 (Tuesday) ==
- Prince Sigvard of Sweden was disowned by the royal family for refusing to break his engagement to a German commoner.
- British Conservative MP Anthony Eden met Adolf Hitler and foreign affairs minister Konstantin von Neurath in Berlin to encourage Germany to return to disarmament talks.
- The northeast United States was struck by a storm that rivaled the famous Blizzard of 1888.
- Born: Bobby Unser, automobile racer, in Colorado Springs, Colorado (d. 2021)

== February 21, 1934 (Wednesday) ==
- Germany arrested 11 bakers for raising the price of bread but not the wages of employees.
- Born: Rue McClanahan, actress, in Healdton, Oklahoma (d. 2010)
- Died: Augusto César Sandino, 38, Nicaraguan revolutionary leader (assassinated)

== February 22, 1934 (Thursday) ==
- The funeral of Albert of Belgium was held at the Cathedral of St. Michael and St. Gudula in Brussels.
- The romantic comedy film It Happened One Night, directed by Frank Capra and starring Clark Gable and Claudette Colbert was released.
- Born: Sparky Anderson, baseball player and manager, in Bridgewater, South Dakota (d. 2010); Van Williams, actor, in Fort Worth, Texas (d. 2016)

== February 23, 1934 (Friday) ==
- Leopold III was crowned King of the Belgians.
- In USA Huey Long unveiled the Share Our Wealth plan with a nationally broadcast radio speech.
- British Prime Minister Ramsay MacDonald refused to meet with 500 hunger marchers who had marched from Glasgow to London.
- The romantic drama film Death Takes a Holiday starring Fredric March premiered at the Paramount Theatre in New York City.
- Born: Augusto Algueró, composer, in Barcelona, Spain (d. 2011)
- Died: Sir Edward Elgar, 76, English composer

== February 24, 1934 (Saturday) ==
- Nazi Germany marked the fourteenth anniversary of the National Socialist Program with a speech by Hitler in the same Munich beer hall where he first proclaimed the 25-point plan. "We won the power in Germany", Hitler declared to the packed hall and to a national audience over the radio. "Now we must win the soul and mind of all Germans. We don't want a nation of half-hearted Nazis."
- Born: Murray Costello, ice hockey player and executive, in South Porcupine, Ontario, Canada (d. 2024); Bettino Craxi, Prime Minister of Italy, in Milan (d. 2000); Renata Scotto, soprano and opera director, in Savona, Italy (d. 2023); Bingu wa Mutharika, politician and economist, in Thyolo, Nyasaland (d. 2012)

== February 25, 1934 (Sunday) ==
- Over 1 million Nazi leaders and sub-leaders swore allegiance to Hitler over the radio in a ceremony presided over by Rudolf Hess.
- Died: John McGraw, 60, American baseball player and manager

== February 26, 1934 (Monday) ==
- 5 were killed and 40 injured in Pittsburgh when a train plummeted off a 30-foot (9.1 m) high viaduct.

== February 27, 1934 (Tuesday) ==
- Reichstag fire defendants Georgi Dimitrov, Vasil Tanev and Blagoy Popov were deported from Berlin to Moscow. The Soviet Union made the three communists Russian citizens after their Bulgarian citizenship had been revoked. Dimitrov claimed that he and his two comrades suffered "moral and physical torture" during their imprisonment.
- Born: Vincent Fourcade, interior designer, in France (d. 1992); Ralph Nader, activist and presidential candidate, in Winsted, Connecticut

== February 28, 1934 (Wednesday) ==
- British hunger marchers gained admittance to the House of Commons by accepting invitations from members of the Labour Party who were sympathetic to their cause.
- Hitler announced in a speech that the "Wehrmacht will be the sole bearer of arms in the nation", thus diminishing the importance of the Sturmabteilung. Ernst Röhm was made to sign a pledge acknowledging the superior stature of the military.
