= March 1934 =

Month of 1934

| << | March 1934 | | | | | >> |
| Su | Mo | Tu | We | Th | Fr | Sa |
| | | | | 1 | 2 | 3 |
| 4 | 5 | 6 | 7 | 8 | 9 | 10 |
| 11 | 12 | 13 | 14 | 15 | 16 | 17 |
| 18 | 19 | 20 | 21 | 22 | 23 | 24 |
| 25 | 26 | 27 | 28 | 29 | 30 | 31 |

The following events occurred in March 1934:

== March 1, 1934 (Thursday) ==
- Puyi was ceremonially enthroned as Emperor of the Japanese puppet state of Manchukuo with the reign name of Kang-de.
- British hunger marchers got inside the House of Commons for the second consecutive day, but 20 were kicked out after causing a disturbance from the Strangers' Gallery.
- Primo Carnera defeated Tommy Loughran by decision at Madison Square Garden Stadium in Miami, Florida to retain the world heavyweight title.
- Born: Jean-Michel Folon, artist, in Uccle, Brussels, Belgium (d. 2005); Joan Hackett, actress, in East Harlem, New York City (d. 1983)
- Died: Charles Webster Leadbeater, 80, English occultist

== March 2, 1934 (Friday) ==
- French police arrested the widow of Alexandre Stavisky in connection with the Stavisky Affair.
- The United States Shipping Board was abolished.

== March 3, 1934 (Saturday) ==
- John Dillinger escaped from Crown Point jail in Indiana.

== March 4, 1934 (Sunday) ==
- The anti-Nazi pastor Martin Niemöller gave a sermon at his church in Dahlem in defiance of a suspension order.
- Born: Mario Davidovsky, composer, in Médanos, Buenos Aires, Argentina (d. 2019); John Duffey, bluegrass musician, in Washington, D.C. (d. 1996); Anne Haney, actress, in Memphis, Tennessee (d. 2001); Barbara McNair, singer and actress, in Chicago, Illinois (d. 2007); Janez Strnad, physicist, in Ljubljana, Yugoslavia (d. 2015)

== March 5, 1934 (Monday) ==
- The Pahiatua earthquake struck northern New Zealand.
- A British court awarded Irina Yusupova, niece of the late Nicholas II of Russia, £25,000 in damages in her lawsuit against the Metro-Goldwyn-Mayer company over the film Rasputin and the Empress. Yusupova claimed that the character Natasha in the film was a libel against her and her character, although the attorneys for MGM had maintained that the character was fictional.
- Joseph Goebbels issued an order to all state governments to forbid Jews from performing on any stages in Germany. "I draw attention to the fact that only members of a professional guild are entitled to appear on the German stage", the order read. "Jews are not permitted membership in these guilds. I therefore request the police authorities to be instructed to demand that actors exhibit their membership cards in the guild. If the actors cannot produce them they are to be prevented from appearing on the stage."
- The U.S. Supreme Court decided Nebbia v. New York.
- Born: Daniel Kahneman, psychologist, in Tel Aviv, Mandatory Palestine (d. 2024); Nicholas Smith, actor, in Banstead, Surrey, England (d. 2015)
- Died: Reşit Galip, Turkish politician and medical doctor (b. 1893)

== March 6, 1934 (Tuesday) ==
- John Dillinger and his men robbed the Securities National Bank and Trust Company in Sioux Falls, South Dakota, making off with $49,500.
- The docudrama play Yellow Jack premiered at the Martin Beck Theatre on Broadway.
- Died: Shūjirō Hara, 62, Japanese businessman and politician

== March 7, 1934 (Wednesday) ==
- In the Soviet Union, a Sovnarkom decree imposed a prison sentence of 3–5 years for those convicted of "homosexual relations". The sentence was increased to 5–8 years if force was used or if the guilty party took advantage of the partner's position of dependence.
- Born: Franklin Clarke, American football player, in Beloit, Wisconsin (d. 2018); Willard Scott, television personality and writer, in Alexandria, Virginia (d. 2021)

== March 8, 1934 (Thursday) ==
- Hitler opened the International Automobile and Motorcycle Exhibition in Berlin. The central attraction was a new German car costing only £61.
- The British historical film The Rise of Catherine the Great premiered in Germany, but hundreds protested outside the Berlin cinema because its star Elisabeth Bergner was Jewish.

== March 9, 1934 (Friday) ==
- Nazi Germany banned The Rise of Catherine the Great because its star and director were Jewish.
- Three big Berlin department stores once part of the Tietz chain reopened under the new name of Union Ltd., with only Christian staff. The Tietz brothers, descended from the German Jewish merchant Hermann Tietz, had been forced out of the directorship of the chain since the Nazis came to power.
- Born: Del Close, actor, writer and teacher, in Manhattan, Kansas (d. 1999); Yuri Gagarin, pilot and cosmonaut, in Klushino, USSR (d. 1968); Joyce Van Patten, actress, in New York City

== March 10, 1934 (Saturday) ==
- President Roosevelt ordered the cessation of air mail delivery by army pilots "except on such routes, under which weather conditions and under such equipment and personnel conditions as will insure, as far as the utmost care can provide, against constant recurrence of fatal accidents." The president's order came after a three-week span in which ten pilots delivering air mail had been killed.

== March 11, 1934 (Sunday) ==
- Vienna's famous Socialist newspaper Arbeiter-Zeitung, banned during February's civil war, reappeared in a form that shared nothing in common with its previous incarnation other than its name and publishing company.
- Switzerland held a referendum on whether voters approved of a federal law on maintaining public order. The proposal was rejected by 53.8% of voters.
- Born: Sam Donaldson, reporter and news anchor, in El Paso, Texas
- Died: Margaret Illington, 54, American actress

== March 12, 1934 (Monday) ==
- Estonian leader Konstantin Päts staged a "self-coup" by declaring martial law and installing Johan Laidoner as Commander in Chief of the army. Päts used his emergency powers to disband the Vaps Movement and arrest 400 of its leading members, removing a threat to his rule. The Era of Silence in Estonian history began.
- General Werner von Blomberg announced that Jews were banned from enlisting in the German military. The ambiguous wording of the announcement made it unclear whether Jews already serving in the military were affected or not.

== March 13, 1934 (Tuesday) ==
- Dillinger and his gang robbed the First National Bank in Mason City, Iowa and got away with $52,000.
- Actress Laura La Plante announced she was divorcing film director William A. Seiter, saying they were "too good pals to be married."
- Born: Barry Hughart, fantasy author, in Peoria, Illinois (d. 2019)

== March 14, 1934 (Wednesday) ==
- Approximately 150 people were killed in a dynamite explosion in the port of La Libertad, El Salvador. The explosion started a fire that burned down four blocks of buildings.
- The historical biographical film The House of Rothschild had its world premiere at the Astor Theatre in New York City.
- Born: Eugene Cernan, astronaut, in Bellwood, Illinois (d. 2017); Paul Rader, 15th General of the Salvation Army, in New York City (d. 2025)

== March 15, 1934 (Thursday) ==
- American fugitive businessman Samuel Insull vanished from his apartment in Greece.
- Born: Richard Layard, Baron Layard, labour economist, in Britain
- Died: Davidson Black, 49, Canadian paleoanthropologist (heart failure)

== March 16, 1934 (Friday) ==
- Cavalcade won Best Picture at the 6th Academy Awards in Los Angeles.
- Samuel Insull was found aboard a Greek freighter bound for Egypt. Greek authorities ordered the ship to turn around and return to port.
- Born: Ray Hnatyshyn, 24th Governor General of Canada, in Saskatoon, Saskatchewan (d. 2002)

== March 17, 1934 (Saturday) ==
- The Rome Protocols were signed between Austria, Hungary and Italy. The agreements strengthened economic ties among the signatories and formed a new power bloc to counterbalance the Little Entente and French influence.
- New York City taxicab drivers went back out on strike again, this time over union recognition.
- University of Cambridge won the 86th Boat Race.
- Born: Fred T. Mackenzie, sedimentary and global biogeochemist, in the United States (d. 2024)

== March 18, 1934 (Sunday) ==
- Benito Mussolini made a speech in Rome outlining a 60-year plan that would give Italy the "primacy of the world" in the 21st century and would make that century a "blackshirt era". Mussolini proclaimed that Italy's future lay to the "east and south in Asia and Africa. The vast resources of Africa must be valourized and Africa brought within the civilized circle. I do not refer to conquest of territory but to natural expansion. We demand that nations which have already arrived in Africa do not block at every step Italian expansion."
- Samuel Insull was allowed to leave Greece by ship again, on the conditions that he enter no Greek ports and that he radio a message ahead of time saying where he would land once he chose to do so.
- Born: Charley Pride, American country singer; in Sledge, Mississippi (d. 2020)

== March 19, 1934 (Monday) ==
- Pope Pius XI canonized three new saints: Giuseppe Benedetto Cottolengo, Pompilio Maria Pirrotti and Teresa Margaret of the Sacred Heart.
- Died: Andrew E. Lee, 87, third Governor of South Dakota

== March 20, 1934 (Tuesday) ==
- Over 100,000 American auto workers were about to go on strike, but it was headed off when President Roosevelt sent a telegram urging that the strike be postponed.
- Born: Willie Brown, politician and 41st Mayor of San Francisco, in Mineola, Texas
- Died: Sydney Deane, 71, Australian cricketer and actor; Emma of Waldeck and Pyrmont, 75, Queen of the Netherlands

== March 21, 1934 (Wednesday) ==
- The Great Hakodate Fire in Japan destroyed one-third of the city and killed over 2,000 people.
- Nazi Germany launched a public works plan aimed at putting 5 million of the country's 6 million unemployed back to work. The program included highway construction, land reclamation and the building of ships and housing.
- Died: Lilyan Tashman, 37, American actress (cancer)

== March 22, 1934 (Thursday) ==
- New York City authorities prohibited all parades by striking cab drivers after a day of rioting.
- The first Masters Tournament in golf began at Augusta National Golf Club in Augusta, Georgia. Horton Smith was the winner.
- Born: Orrin Hatch, politician, in Pittsburgh, Pennsylvania (d. 2022); Larry Martyn, comic actor, in London, England (d. 1994)

== March 23, 1934 (Friday) ==
- Thousands of Fascists gathered in Rome to mark the fifteenth anniversary of the Fasci Italiani di Combattimento.
- Golden Miller won the Grand National horse race.
- Born: Janet Elizabeth Shearon, future wife of American astronaut Neil Armstrong (d. 2018, lung cancer)

== March 24, 1934 (Saturday) ==
- President Roosevelt signed the Philippine Independence Act, or the Tydings–McDuffie Act, providing for a ten-year transition phase leading to self-government for the Philippines.
- An editorial in Mussolini's newspaper Il Popolo d'Italia wrote that "The dimunition of births in the United States is assuming alarming proportions". The editorial concluded, "When we reflect there are in the United States 11,500,000 Negroes, people of extraordinary fecundity, it is necessary to conclude with a real cry of alarm. The Yellow Peril is nothing. We will encounter an Africanized America in which the white race, by the inexorable law of numbers, will end by being suffocated by the fertile grandsons of Uncle Tom. Are we to see within a century a Negro in the White House?"

== March 25, 1934 (Sunday) ==
- The threatened American auto workers' strike was averted when the Roosevelt Administration created a National Automotive Labor Board to help resolve disputes.
- Italian general elections were held in the form of a referendum on a single list of Fascist Party candidates. They were the last elections held in Fascist Italy as the only real purpose of this Chamber of Deputies was to approve Mussolini's plan for a new corporative state and then commit "suicide" by voting its own dissolution. The Fascists won 99.84% approval in a foregone conclusion.
- Born: Johnny Burnette, rockabilly musician, in Memphis, Tennessee (d. 1964); Gloria Steinem, feminist, in Toledo, Ohio

== March 26, 1934 (Monday) ==
- The Strength Through Joy organization in Nazi Germany announced that every week during the summer 3,500 workers would be taken on a free vacation cruise aboard a German ocean liner.
- Born: Alan Arkin, actor, director, musician and author, in Brooklyn, New York (d. 2023)

== March 27, 1934 (Tuesday) ==
- President Franklin D. Roosevelt suffered his first defeat in congress. Roosevelt vetoed a bill increasing compensation to war veterans, but the House promptly overrode the veto by repassing the bill 310-72.

== March 28, 1934 (Wednesday) ==
- The U.S. Senate joined the House in overriding President Roosevelt's veto of a war veterans' compensation bill, by a vote of 63-27. The bill added $228 million to payments for disabled war veterans and federal employees.
- Austrian Chancellor Engelbert Dollfuss banned jokes about his height.
- Born: Lester R. Brown, environmentalist, in Bridgeton, New Jersey; Laurie Taitt, sprint hurdler, in Georgetown, British Guiana (d. 2006)
- Died: Mahmoud Mokhtar, 42, Egyptian sculptor

== March 29, 1934 (Thursday) ==
- Austria banned 100 foreign publications, including the magazines The Saturday Evening Post and Daily Sketch, but gave no reason why. The Dollfuss government also ordered the removal of nude statues from public display.
- The film The Prizefighter and the Lady was banned in Nazi Germany because its star Max Baer was Jewish.
- Samuel Insull arrived by ship at Istanbul.
- Died: Otto Hermann Kahn, 67, German-born American banker, collector, philanthropist and patron of the arts

== March 30, 1934 (Friday) ==
- Zeppo Marx quit the Marx Brothers.
- The New York City cab driver's strike began to peter out as many strikers went back to work.

== March 31, 1934 (Saturday) ==
- The respected German newspaper Vossische Zeitung published its final edition after 230 years of existence. An editorial stated that "in a certain sense it is the victim of the crisis that affects the entire German press."
- The musical film Wonder Bar was released.
- Born: Richard Chamberlain, actor and singer, in Beverly Hills, California (d. 2025); Shirley Jones, singer and actress, in Charleroi, Pennsylvania; Carlo Rubbia, particle physicist, inventor and Nobel laureate, in Gorizia, Italy; Orion Samuelson, broadcaster, in Ontario, Wisconsin
