= January 1934 =

Month of 1934

| << | January 1934 | | | | | >> |
| Su | Mo | Tu | We | Th | Fr | Sa |
| | 1 | 2 | 3 | 4 | 5 | 6 |
| 7 | 8 | 9 | 10 | 11 | 12 | 13 |
| 14 | 15 | 16 | 17 | 18 | 19 | 20 |
| 21 | 22 | 23 | 24 | 25 | 26 | 27 |
| 28 | 29 | 30 | 31 |

The following events occurred in January 1934:

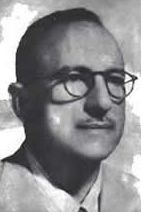
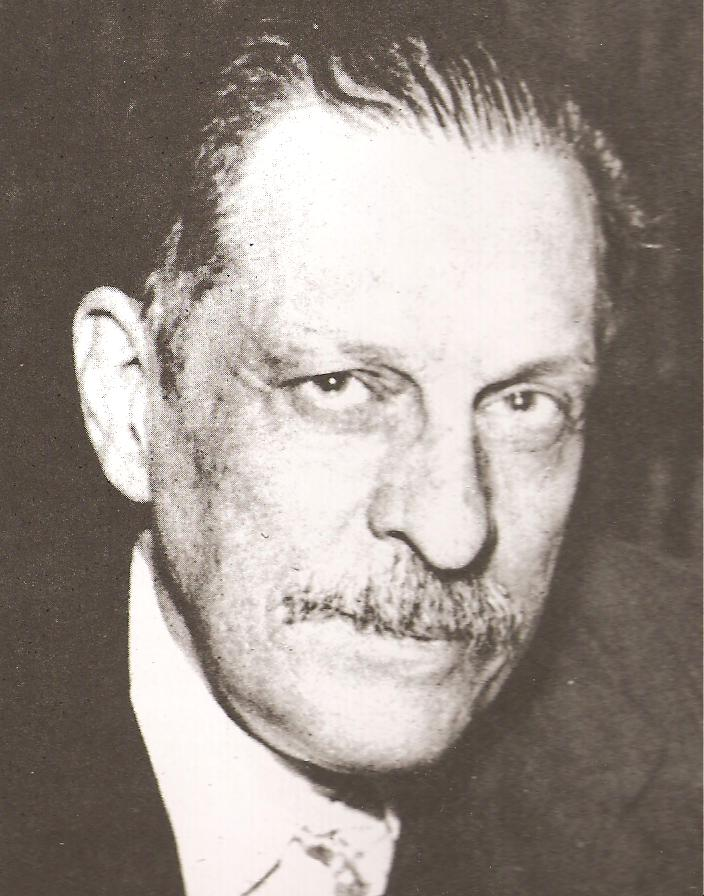
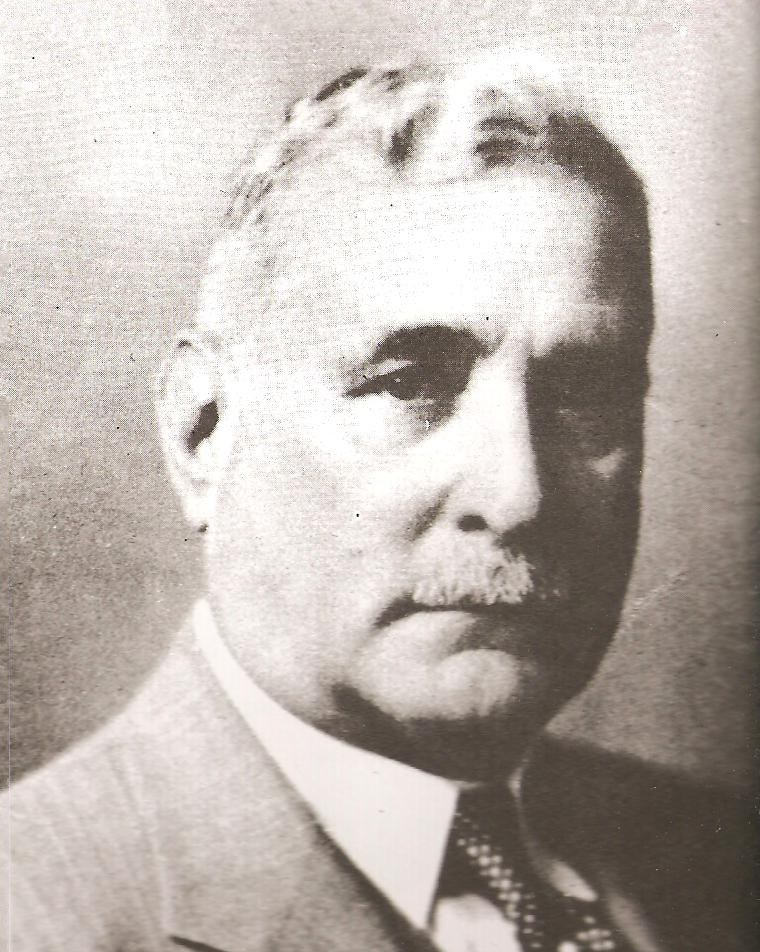
January 18, 1934: Cuba has three consecutive presidents in eight hours: Carlos Hevia, Manuel Marquez and Carlos Mendieta
January 26, 1934: Germany and Poland sign 10-year non-aggression pact

== January 1, 1934 (Monday) ==
- A flood in Montrose, California killed at least 45 people.
- The International Telecommunication Union was established.
- The National Council for Civil Liberties was established in the UK by Ronald Kidd and Sylvia Crowther-Smith.
- The Law for the Prevention of Hereditarily Diseased Offspring went into effect in Nazi Germany.
- Fiorello H. La Guardia took office as Mayor of New York City.
- In New Zealand, radio station 3YL Christchurch was launched.
- Died: Winston and Weston Doty, 20, twin child actors, drowned in the Montrose flood.

== January 2, 1934 (Tuesday) ==
- The Warka Vase was found at Uruk, as a collection of fragments, by German Assyriologists in their sixth excavation season.
- Cuban President Ramón Grau signed a decree setting April 22 as the date for the election of a constitutional assembly. Grau also said that he would not be continuing in the presidency beyond May 20.

== January 3, 1934 (Wednesday) ==
- U.S. President Franklin D. Roosevelt gave the 1934 State of the Union Address, the first time the address had been given in January. In the address he outlined the present state of the New Deal and his visions for its future.
- An explosion at a mine in Osek, Czechoslovakia, resulted in the collapse of a tower, starting a fire and burying 144 people underground.
- Died: Victor Spencer, 1st Viscount Churchill, 69, British peer and courtier

== January 4, 1934 (Thursday) ==
- The Henschel Hs 121 aircraft made its maiden flight.
- A new station building was opened at Leigh-on-Sea railway station, UK.
- A bomb was thrown at the Yugoslavian consulate in Klagenfurt, Austria, damaging the building and blowing out windows of nearby buildings but not causing any injuries. Officials suspected Austrian Nazis were to blame due to recent articles in a government newspaper alleging that the Nazis promised to give Carinthia to Yugoslavia in the event of a German annexation of Austria.
- Born: Rudolf Schuster, President of Slovakia 1999–2004; in Košice

== January 5, 1934 (Friday) ==
- A huge fire broke out at Fenway Park in Boston, doing $220,000 in damage.
- The British cargo ship Paris ran aground in the Tsugaru Strait in Japan near Omasake.
- Born:
  - Eddy Pieters Graafland, Dutch footballer; in Amsterdam (d. 2020)
  - Phil Ramone, recording engineer, record producer and musician; in South Africa (d. 2013)

== January 6, 1934 (Saturday) ==
- Reich Bishop of Germany Ludwig Müller issued a sweeping decree giving himself the power to dismiss pastors and church officials who opposed the government.
- The Norwegian cargo ship SS Torlak sprung a leak and was abandoned in the Norwegian Sea. All crew were rescued by the Queen's Cross, which had been towing the ship to the United Kingdom for scrapping. Torlak was towed into Bodø, Nordland by another Norwegian ship SS Hadsel. where she was beached.
- Died: Herbert Chapman, 55, English footballer and manager

== January 7, 1934 (Sunday) ==
- Pastors in hundreds of German churches disclaimed allegiance to Bishop Müller. A statement from Martin Niemöller on behalf of the opposition said that Müller's "contradictory attitude has made it impossible to retain confidence in him ... When bishops err we must not follow ... We must obey God before man."
- The Flash Gordon comic strip was first published, in the United States.
- The Curtiss XF13C-1, prototype of the monoplane version of the Curtiss XF13C, made its first flight.
- Born:
  - Jean Corbeil, Canadian politician; in Montreal (d. 2002)
  - Tassos Papadopoulos, Cypriot politician; in Nicosia (d. 2008)

== January 8, 1934 (Monday) ==
- The U.S. Supreme Court decided Home Building & Loan Ass'n v. Blaisdell.
- Born: Jacques Anquetil, French cyclist who won the Tour de France five times; in Mont-Saint-Aignan, Seine-Maritime département (d. 1987)

== January 9, 1934 (Tuesday) ==
- Three people died and 15 were injured in London traffic accidents due to thick fog.
- The gilded bronze sculpture of Prometheus, created by Paul Manship, was dedicated at Rockefeller Center in New York City.
- SEPU (Sociedad Española de Precios Únicos, S.A.) was founded in Barcelona, Spain.
- The New York Artists Union picketed the Whitney Museum of American Art with placards targeting the director, Juliana Force.
- Born: Bart Starr, American football player and coach; in Montgomery, Alabama (d. 2019)
- Died: Alexandre Stavisky, 47, French financier and embezzler, committed suicide.

== January 10, 1934 (Wednesday) ==
- In France, the Compagnie du chemin de fer de Paris à Orléans and Chemins de fer du Midi merged to form the Chemins de fer de Paris à Orléans et du Midi, operating lines from Paris towards the south-west, with some P-O lines in southern Brittany passing to the Chemins de fer de l'État.
- Carl Theodor, Count of Toerring-Jettenbach married Princess Elizabeth of Greece and Denmark in Upper Bavaria.
- Born: Leonid Kravchuk, the first President of Ukraine (1991 to 1994); in Wołyń Voivodeship; Poland (d. 2022)
- Died: Marinus van der Lubbe, 25, Dutch communist, was executed in Germany after being convicted of setting fire to the Reichstag building.

== January 11, 1934 (Thursday) ==
- Austrian Chancellor Engelbert Dollfuss delegated control of the national police to Vice Chancellor Emil Fey, essentially putting the Heimwehr in charge of law enforcement.
- A flight of six United States Navy Consolidated P2Y flying boats set a new distance record for formation flying of 2,400 miles (3,900 km) between San Francisco, California, and Pearl Harbor, Territory of Hawaii. They also set a new speed record for this crossing of 24 hours 35 minutes.
- Prussian secret police raided the homes of members of the Pfarrernotbund and confiscated membership lists.
- Born: Jean Chrétien, Prime Minister of Canada from 1993 to 2003; in Shawinigan, Quebec

== January 12, 1934 (Friday) ==
- The British battleship HMS Nelson ran aground near Portsmouth Harbour and remained embarrassingly stuck for 12 hours.
- The German-Swiss film William Tell (German: Wilhelm Tell), directed by Heinz Paul and starring Hans Marr, Conrad Veidt and Emmy Göring was released. It was made in Germany by Terra Film, with a separate English-language version supervised by Manning Haynes also being released. While working on the film, Veidt, who had recently given sympathetic performances of Jews in Jew Suss (1934) and The Wandering Jew, was detained by the authorities.
- Born: Mick Sullivan, English rugby league footballer; in Dewsbury, West Riding of Yorkshire (d. 2016)

== January 13, 1934 (Saturday) ==
- Skating at Eisstadion Davos, Liselotte Landbeck broke the world record for the 500m speed skating women event.
- Greek Prime Minister Panagis Tsaldaris ordered the American fugitive businessman Samuel Insull to leave Greece by January 31.
- Born:
  - Eva Olmerová, Czech singer; in Prague, Czechoslovakia (d. 1993)
  - Rip Taylor (stage name for Charles Elmer Taylor Jr.), American actor and comedian; in Washington, D.C. (d. 2019)
- Died: Paul Ulrich Villard, 73, French chemist and physicist who discovered gamma rays

== January 14, 1934 (Sunday) ==
- For the second straight Sunday, German pastors opposed to Bishop Müller denounced him from their pulpits.
- The De Havilland Express prototype flew for the first time; Qantas representative Lester Brain immediately rejected the single-pilot layout, anticipating pilot fatigue on long flights.
- Torquay Tramways replaced the tram from Torquay to Paignton with a bus service. The rest of the network was closed down at the end of the month.
- Born: Richard Briers, English actor; in Raynes Park, Surrey (d. 2013)
- Died: Walker Hines, 63, American railroad executive

== January 15, 1934 (Monday) ==
- An 8.0 magnitude earthquake killed at least 6,000 people when it struck Nepal, and Bihar in British India. The quake was rated on the Mercalli intensity scale as XI (Extreme). Some estimates placed the death toll at 10,700.
- All 10 passengers and crew were killed in the crash of the Air France airplane Emeraude, when the Dewoitine D.332 struck a hillside in France near Corbigny. The plane was on the final scheduled part of a flight that at started on January 5 from Saigon in French Indochina, and was flying from Lyon to Paris-Le Bourget Airport, when it encountered a snowstorm.
- Ramón Grau was forced to resign as President of Cuba and was replaced by Carlos Hevia. Soldiers fired on a crowd of Grau supporters gathered around the presidential palace, killing three. Hevia would serve for only three days before the military officials demanded his resignation.
- The Danish artist group Linien opened their first exhibition in Copenhagen, presenting 177 works of abstract-surrealist art.
- The Daily Mail printed the editorial "Hurrah for the Blackshirts!", in praise of Fascism. The piece was written by the newspaper's owner, Harold Harmsworth, 1st Viscount Rothermere.
- Died: Hermann Bahr, 70, Austrian writer, playwright, director and critic

== January 16, 1934 (Tuesday) ==
- Clyde Barrow helped five prisoners, including the notorious Raymond Hamilton, escape from the Eastham Unit prison farm in Texas. One mounted guard was killed in the jailbreak.
- The German Supreme Court in Leipzig sentenced writer Ludwig Renn to two and a half years in prison for conspiracy to commit high treason.
- Minister President of Prussia Hermann Göring ordered the three main Prussian Masonic Lodges to disband, explaining there was "no further need for the existence."
- Hurtig & Seamon's New Burlesque Theater in Harlem re-opened as a venue for black clientele under a new name, the Apollo Theater.
- Christina MacLennan gave birth to the second of twin babies, in Stornoway in the county of Ross and Cromarty, Scotland; the first was born on the island of Scarp in the county of Inverness-shire two days earlier.
- The dramatic play Wednesday's Child premiered at the Longacre Theatre on Broadway.
- Born: Marilyn Horne, American mezzo-soprano opera singer; in Bradford, Pennsylvania
- Died: Tokihiko Okada, 30, Japanese film actor

== January 17, 1934 (Wednesday) ==
- Carlos Hevia resigned as President of Cuba on just his third day in office.
- The Jonker diamond was found at the Elandsfontein mine in South Africa by Johannes Jacobus Jonker.
- The Prussian Economic and Labour Ministry ordered miners to accompany their traditional greeting of "Glück auf" with a raising of the right hand.
- Born: Cedar Walton, American jazz pianist; in Dallas (d. 2013)

== January 18, 1934 (Thursday) ==
- At 1:20 in the morning Manuel Márquez Sterling was named the new President of Cuba by the military chiefs of staff, to take over from Carlos Hevia, who had quit after three days. Marquez served for six hours before being removed at 7:20 a.m. and was then replaced by Carlos Mendieta, who would serve until December 11, 1935.
- Austrian Chancellor Engelbert Dollfuss made a speech implicitly warning Germany not to meddle in Austrian affairs, saying that "it is perhaps not an entirely safe game when a country, whose importance in central Europe and, indeed, all Europe is generally understood and recognized, continues to be constitutionally threatened in its independence and freedom by a great power – which unfortunately is also a country inhabited by brother folk."
- Nine of the crew of the SS Oakford were killed when the British cargo ship ran aground off Vlieland in the Netherlands.
- The Australian airline, Qantas, and the British company, Imperial Airways, joined forces to establish a joint subsidiary, "Qantas Empire Airways Ltd".
- Born: Raymond Briggs, British illustrator and author; in Wimbledon, London (d. 2022)

== January 19, 1934 (Friday) ==
- Nazi Germany closed the notorious Kemna concentration camp and redistributed its prisoners due to word spreading of the torture going on inside.
- Baseball Commissioner Kenesaw Mountain Landis rejected Shoeless Joe Jackson's application for reinstatement, barring Jackson from accepting a managerial job for a minor league ballclub in Greenville, South Carolina.

== January 20, 1934 (Saturday) ==
- The Japanese company Fuji Photo Film was established.
- Nazi Germany enacted the Law Regulating National Labour, depriving workers of the right to go on strike, or to negotiate with their employers.
- The Boeing XP-940, prototype of the Boeing P-29, made its first flight.
- The funeral of the veteran nationalist MP Joseph Devlin took place in Belfast, Northern Ireland.
- The operatic musical comedy Giuditta by Franz Lehár premiered at the Vienna State Opera.
- Born:
  - Tom Baker, English actor; in Liverpool
  - Dave Hull, American radio personality; in Alhambra, California (d. 2020)
  - Camilo Pascual, Cuban baseball player; in Havana

== January 21, 1934 (Sunday) ==
- A British Union of Fascists rally in Birmingham, England, organised by Oswald Mosley, attracted 10,000 people. Mosley gave a speech calling for a "modern dictatorship" that would be "armed with powers to overcome the problems that people want overcome."
- Fog in London was so thick that it penetrated the Royal Albert Hall and obscured a performance by Amelita Galli-Curci.
- The Estádio Municipal 25 de Abril opened in Penafiel, Portugal.
- Born: Ann Wedgeworth, American actress; in Abilene, Texas (d. 2017)
- Died:
  - Friedrich Ferdinand, Duke of Schleswig-Holstein, 78
  - Paul Troost, 55, German architect

== January 22, 1934 (Monday) ==
- Sadao Araki resigned as Japan's Minister of War. He was replaced by Senjūrō Hayashi the following day.
- German Catholic theologian Karl Adam denounced the Nazis for attempting to capture the youth of the country for their own purposes.
- After extensive construction work, a new railway line through Greenisland was opened by the Northern Ireland rail authority.
- The opera Lady Macbeth of the Mtsensk District by Dmitri Shostakovich premiered at the Malyi Opera Theatre in Leningrad.
- Born:
  - Vijay Anand, Indian filmmaker; in Bangalore, British India (d. 2004)
  - Bill Bixby, American TV actor; in San Francisco (d. 1993)
  - Graham Kerr, British cook and television personality; in London
  - Nolan Strong, American R&B and doo-wop singer; in Scottsboro, Alabama (d. 1970)
- Died: Mark L. Hersey, 70, American general

== January 23, 1934 (Tuesday) ==
- The United States formally recognized Cuba.
- Special courts were created in Germany to try newspaper journalists.
- Stanislav Kosior began his third term as First Secretary of the Communist Party of Ukraine.
- The comedic stage play No More Ladies opened at the Booth Theatre on Broadway.
- Born: Lou Antonio, American actor and director; in Oklahoma City, Oklahoma

== January 24, 1934 (Wednesday) ==
- A constitutional amendment in Estonia came into effect, giving head of state Konstantin Päts wide-ranging powers. It would remain in place until 1938 when a new constitution took effect.
- In a battle in the war in Ningxia in China, the National Revolutionary Army of General Sun Dianying was stopped by the Ma clique's heavy resistance, just 13 miles from Yinchuan, Ningxia's capital, preventing Sun from conquering the province.
- Maurice Thorez leader of the French Communist Party (PCF), said that the Communists would not consider an alliance with the Socialist Party.
- Albert Einstein visited the White House to meet US President Franklin D Roosevelt.

== January 25, 1934 (Thursday) ==
- John Dillinger and his companion Billie Frechette were arrested at a house in North Avenue, Tucson, Arizona, United States.

== January 26, 1934 (Friday) ==
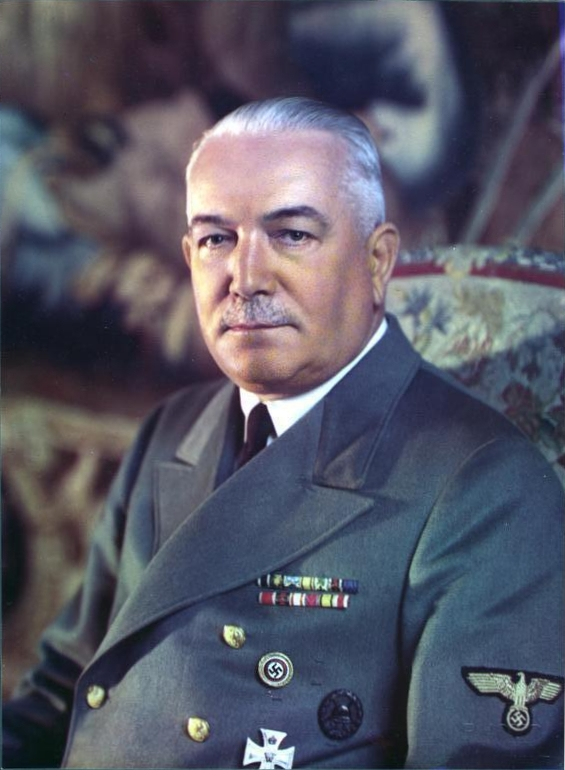
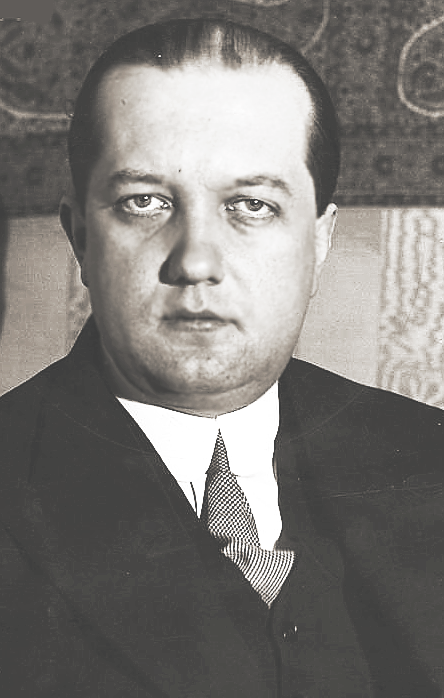
Germany's Minister Neurath and Poland's Ambassador Lipski
- A 10-year German–Polish declaration of non-aggression was signed in Berlin by Germany's Foreign Minister Konstantin von Neurath and Poland's Ambassador to Germany, Józef Lipski. The pact would last for five years before Adolf Hitler's unilateral termination of it on April 28, 1939, four months before the German invasion of Poland on September 1, 1939.
- Samuel Goldwyn purchased the film rights to the book The Wonderful Wizard of Oz from the L. Frank Baum estate for $40,000.
- The Cecil B. DeMille-directed film Four Frightened People was released.
- Born: Bob Uecker, baseball player, sportscaster and actor; in Milwaukee, Wisconsin (d. 2025).

== January 27, 1934 (Saturday) ==
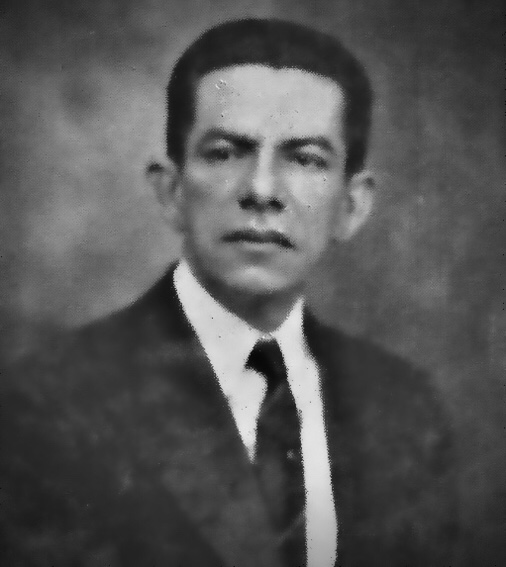
Arias

- Panamanian acting president Harmodio Arias Madrid survived an attempt on his life as he drove through a remote spot on the way to his country residence. The assassination attempt was kept a secret from the public for five days because relatives of the president were said to have been implicated.
- Camille Chautemps resigned as Prime Minister of France over the Stavisky Affair.
- Nikola Uzunović became Prime Minister of Yugoslavia for the second time.

== January 28, 1934 (Sunday) ==
- A group of 5,000 Cuban rail workers went on strike for more pay.
- Born: Bill White, American baseball player and sportscaster; in Lakewood, Florida
- Died: Armand Rassenfosse, 71, Belgian graphic artist

== January 29, 1934 (Monday) ==
- The Chinese cargo liner SS Chungshing was crushed by ice and sank in the Bohai Sea (approximately 38°N 119°E). All passengers and crew were rescued.
- Austria was in a state of alarm over fears that Nazis would attempt a coup on the first anniversary of Hitler's chancellorship. Engelbert Dollfuss warned, "Trouble will brew on the Nazi front on or about January 30. I am asking you to risk life and limb in the defense of Austria."
- Died: Fritz Haber, 65, German chemist, Nobel Prize laureate

== January 30, 1934 (Tuesday) ==
- On the first anniversary of Hitler's appointment as chancellor, the Reichstag passed the "Law on the Reconstruction of the Reich" (Gesetz über den Neuaufbau des Reichs), transferring sovereignty rights of the states to the federal government and dissolving the state parliaments (landtage). Hitler appeared before the Reichstag and gave a lengthy speech listing his government's accomplishments.
- U.S. President Roosevelt signed the Gold Reserve Act into law in the United States, and all gold held in the Federal Reserve was surrendered to the United States Department of the Treasury; immediately following this, Roosevelt raised the statutory gold price from US$20.67 per troy ounce to $35.
- Soviet pilots Pavel Fedosenko, Andrey Vasenko, and Ilya Usyskin took the hydrogen-filled high-altitude balloon Osoaviakhim-1 on its maiden flight to a record-setting altitude of 22,000 meters (72,000 ft), where it remained for twelve minutes. The 7-hour 14-minute flight—during which the balloon traveled 470 kilometers (290 mi) from its launch site—ended in tragedy when the crew lost control of the balloon during its descent. The gondola disintegrated and crashed near the village of Potizh-Ostrog in the Insarsky District of the Mordovian Autonomous Oblast, killing the crew.
- Over 6,000 dances and parties were held across the United States on the occasion of President Roosevelt's 52nd birthday as a fundraiser for the Warm Springs Foundation and polio rehabilitation. Over $1 million was raised.
- Artist Salvador Dalí and his muse Gala were married in a simple civil ceremony in Paris.
- Born: Tammy Grimes, American actress and singer; in Lynn, Massachusetts (d. 2016)

== January 31, 1934 (Wednesday) ==
- Édouard Daladier became Prime Minister of France for the second time.
- Police in Chicago apprehended bank robber and kidnapper Verne Sankey in a barber shop.
- Italy announced its support for negotiations that would allow rearmament for Germany, expressing confidence that Germany was not thinking of "war-like moves outside her borders" and that guarantees would be provided that the increased armaments would not be used to infringe upon the security of other nations.
- Sir Philip Whistler Street completed his term of office as Chief Justice of the Supreme Court of New South Wales, to be replaced by Sir Frederick Richard Jordan.
- Born:
  - Bob Turner, Canadian ice hockey player; in Regina, Saskatchewan (d. 2005)
  - Grahame Woods, English-born Canadian cinematographer, television playwright and novelist (d. 2022)
