= December 1933 =

Month of 1933

<<	December 1933					>>
Su	Mo	Tu	We	Th	Fr	Sa
					1	2
3	4	5	6	7	8	9
10	11	12	13	14	15	16
17	18	19	20	21	22	23
24	25	26	27	28	29	30
31

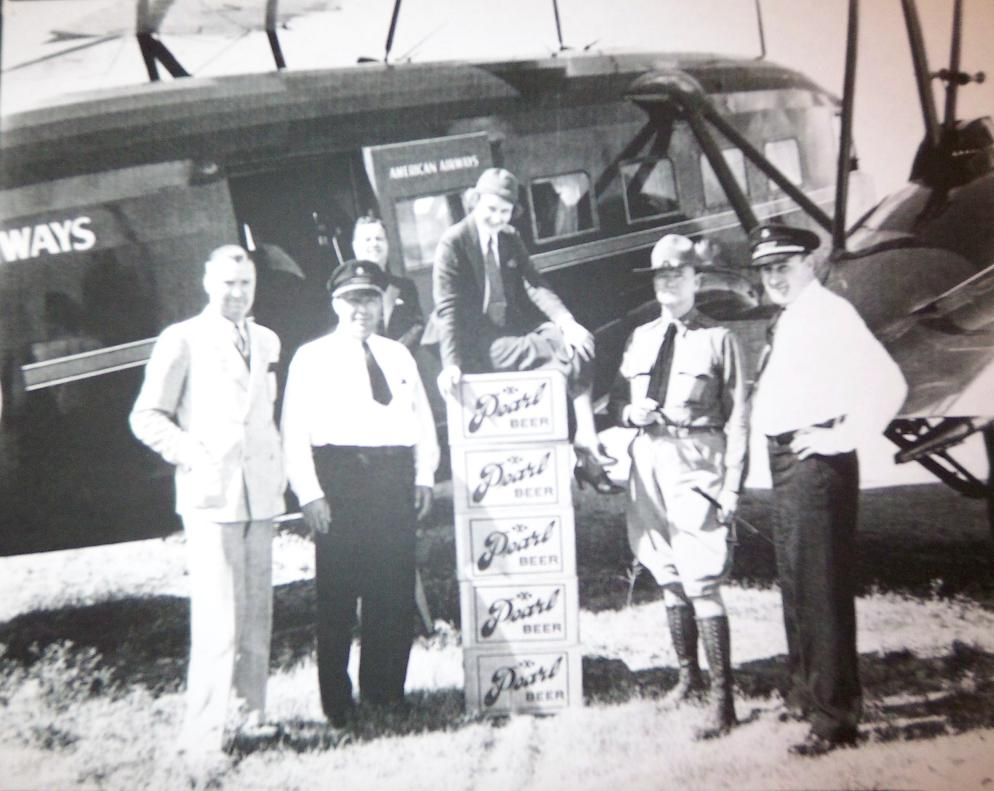
December 5, 1933: Prohibition ends in the United States

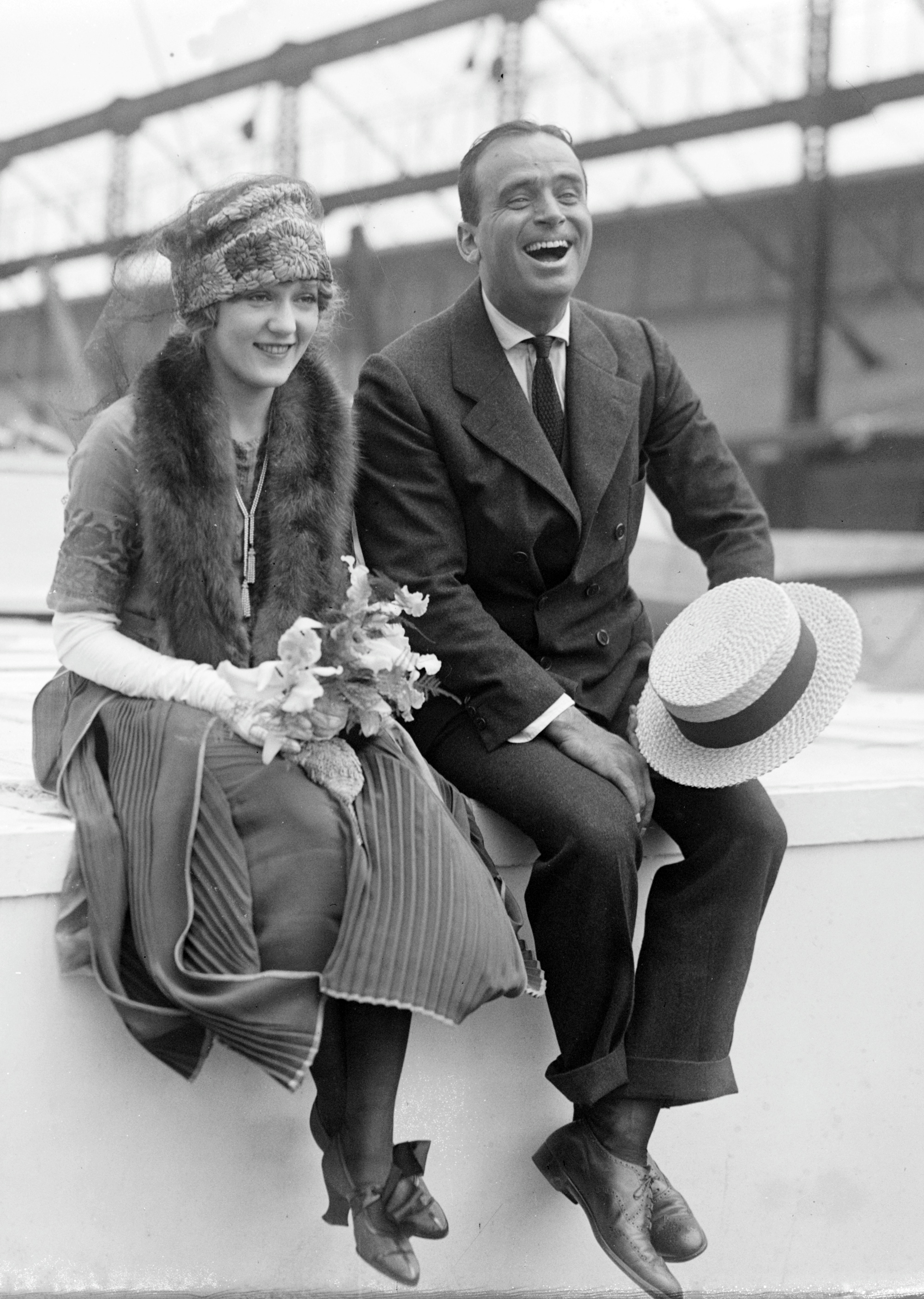
December 9, 1933: Mary Pickford and Douglas Fairbanks divorce

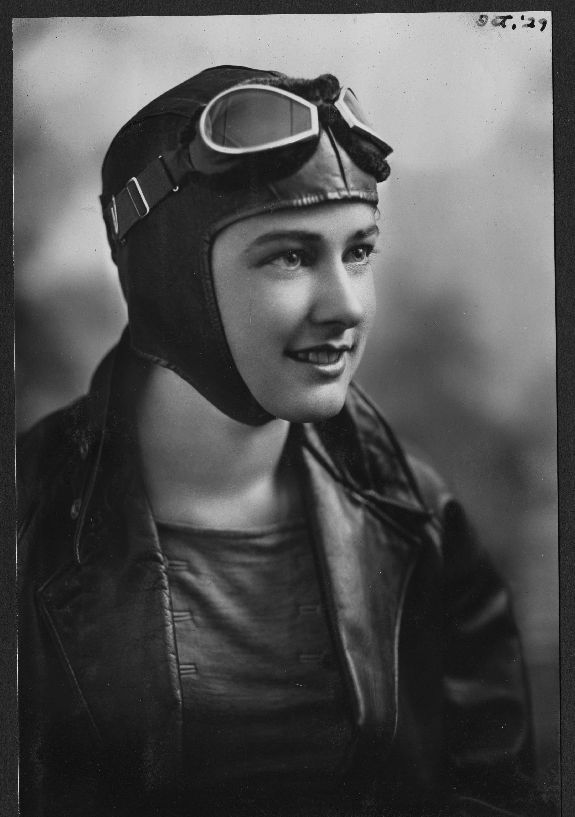
December 30, 1933: Helen Richey broke world flight endurance record with Frances Marsalis

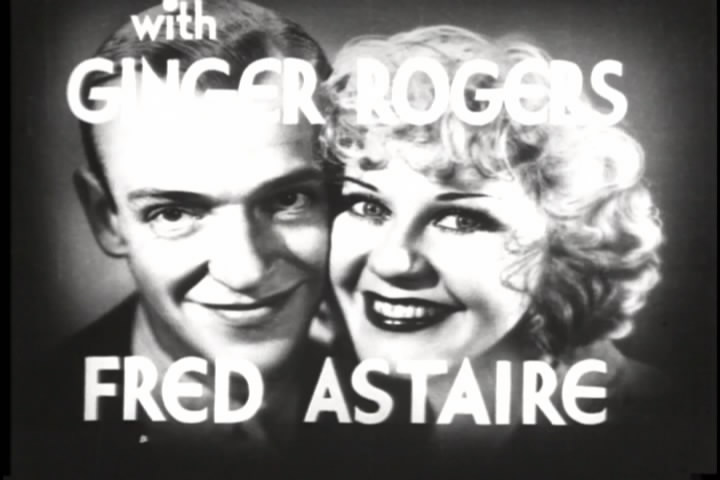
December 29, 1933: Ginger Rogers and Fred Astaire appear in first film

The following events occurred in December 1933:

== December 1, 1933 (Friday) ==
- The Law to Secure the Unity of Party and State (Gesetz zur Sicherung der Einheit von Partei und Staat) was promulgated in Nazi Germany to establish a close interconnection between the Nazi Party and the state, giving the party significant control over the government. The new legislation's first section declared that "After the victory of the National Socialist revolution, the National Socialist German Workers' Party is the bearer of the concept of the German state and is inseparable from the state," and permitted dictatorial power by Chancellor Adolf Hitler.
- Born:
  - Lou Rawls, African-American singer; in Chicago (d. 2006)
  - Hiroshi Fujimoto, Japanese cartoon artist who teamed with Motoo Abiko to write under the pseudonym Fujiko Fujio; in Toyama Prefecture (d. 1996)
- Died:
  - Harry de Windt, 67, British explorer
  - Richard B. Mellon, 75, American financier

== December 2, 1933 (Saturday) ==
- In the close to the 1933 college football season in the U.S., the Army Cadets, the nation's only major unbeaten and untied college team (9–0–0), was upset, 13–12 by a 2–5–1 Notre Dame in a game watched by 80,000 people at Yankee Stadium in New York. On the same day, the Princeton Tigers closed the season unbeaten (with a 9-0-0 record) by defeating Yale, 27 to 2. The Michigan Wolverines, which had finished 7–0–1 the week before, were named as the national champion under the Dickinson System that was used prior to 1936, and are now recognized by the NCAA as the 1933 champions. Princeton was retroactively declared the national champion by former college coach Parke H. Davis for the 1934 Spalding's Football Guide, a selection also recognized by the NCAA.
- According to Bruno Hauptmann, it was on this date that his business associate, Isidor Fisch, left a shoebox with him while Fisch went to Germany. Hauptmann would tell FBI investigators that, eight months later, he opened the shoebox and found $15,000 in cash and began spending the money because Fisch (who would die on March 29, 1934) owed him $7,000. Hauptmann's alibi, for being caught with $13,760 of bills that had been paid as ransom in the Lindbergh kidnapping, was not believed by the jury that convicted him of the kidnapping and murder of one-year-old Charles Lindbergh, Jr.; the press would dub the account the "Fisch story".
- In the last convictions for conspiracy to violate the National Prohibition Act, Frank Cornero and his sister Catherine were found guilty in a federal court in Los Angeles. They were sentenced to two years in prison and fined $500 apiece, but U.S. District Judge Paul J. McCormick suspended the prison sentences.
- Born: Mike Larrabee, American Olympic track athlete, 1964 gold medalist;, in Hollywood, California (d. 2003)

== December 3, 1933 (Sunday) ==
- The first concrete was poured for the Grand Coulee Dam in the U.S. state of Washington on the Columbia River.
- Born: Paul J. Crutzen, Dutch chemist, 1995 Nobel Prize in Chemistry laureate; in Amsterdam (d. 2021)

== December 4, 1933 (Monday) ==
- The American radio soap opera Ma Perkins began a 27-season run with 7,065 episodes, starting on the NBC Red Network. It would last until November 25, 1960.
- Tobacco Road, the most popular Broadway play and musical of the 1930s, premiered at the Theatre Mask in New York City with the first of 3,182 performances. Closing on May 31, 1941, Tobacco Road would hold the record for the longest-running Broadway show until surpassed by Life with Father.
- Died: Stefan George, 65, German poet

== December 5, 1933 (Tuesday) ==
- The Twenty-first Amendment to the United States Constitution, repealing the Eighteenth Amendment to the United States Constitution that enacted Prohibition across the U.S., was ratified by the 36th of 48 states, bringing the necessary 3/4ths majority necessary to take effect. At 3:32 pm local time, the constitutional convention in Utah, whose 21 delegates had been elected on November 7, voted for repeal. Earlier in the day, Ohio and Pennsylvania had become the 34th and 35th states, respectively, to ratify the amendment.
- Clarence Norris, the first of the Scottsboro Boys to receive a new trial, was found guilty of rape and sentenced to death for the third time. His attorney, Samuel S. Leibowitz, appealed the verdict of the Decatur, Alabama jury.

== December 6, 1933 (Wednesday) ==
- U.S. District Judge John M. Woolsey ruled that the James Joyce novel Ulysses was not obscene, ending a 12-year-long ban against importation of the book into the United States, and clearing the way for Random House to sell the controversial work.
- Born: Henryk Górecki, Polish composer; in Czernica (d. 2010)

== December 7, 1933 (Thursday) ==
- Good-bye, Mr. Chips, a book by James Hilton about an English schoolmaster, was first published as a 17,000 word novella in the Christmas issue of The British Weekly. Popular in Britain, Mr. Chips was reprinted in the United States in the Atlantic Monthly in 1934, and then as a best-selling book in both nations, a 1939 film and a 1969 musical.
- The Fleet Marine Force of the United States Marine Corps was established by General Order Number 241 of the Department of the Navy as an amphibious strike force.

== December 8, 1933 (Friday) ==
- An anarchist insurrection broke out in Zaragoza, Spain, where members of the Confederación Nacional del Trabajo (CNT) proclaim libertarian communism.
- Bernadette Soubirous, who had seen the first vision of the Virgin Mary at Lourdes on February 1, 1858, was canonized as a saint of the Roman Catholic Church.
- Died: Karl Jatho, 60, German airplane pioneer who claimed that he had been the first man to fly an airplane; Jatho briefly took to the air on August 18, 1903, three months before the Wright Brothers.; John Joly, 76, Irish physicist

== December 9, 1933 (Saturday) ==
- The most publicized romance of its day officially came to an end as Mary Pickford filed for divorce from Douglas Fairbanks.
- The University of Michigan, at 7–0–1 the only major unbeaten college football team, was awarded the mythical national championship under the "Dickinson System".
- Born: Orville Moody, American golfer, 1969 U.S. Open winner; in Chickasha, Oklahoma (d. 2008)
- Died: Chang Apana, 61, Chinese-American detective for the Honolulu Police Department, said to have been the prototype of 'Charlie Chan.

== December 10, 1933 (Sunday) ==
- The Iron Guard (Garda de fier), Romania's fascist political organization, was ordered dissolved by Prime Minister Ion G. Duca ten days before elections for parliament were to start, and arrests were made of about 18,000 of the organization's members. General Gheorghe-Granicerul Cantacuzino warned Duca that he had "signed his own death sentence", and Duca was assassinated 19 days later by one of the Iron Guard members.
- Died: János Hadik, 70, Hungarian politician who briefly served as that nation's Prime Minister

== December 11, 1933 (Monday) ==
- In the Chaco War, the last two of Bolivia's three tanks were captured by Paraguay. Seven years earlier, Bolivia had signed a contract worth 1.25 million British pounds to purchase 3 six-ton Vickers Mk E tanks. One tank had been destroyed on July 4. At Campo Via, the two tanks had been immobilized by Paraguay's 7th Cavalry in thick vegetation, after soldiers cut down quebracho trees in front and behind of the vehicles. The Bolivian crews surrendered after their ammunition ran out and the heat inside the armored vehicles became unbearable.

== December 12, 1933 (Tuesday) ==
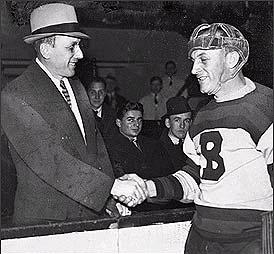
Bailey and Shore in later years

- Ace Bailey of the Toronto Maple Leafs was seriously injured and almost killed by Eddie Shore of the Boston Bruins, in the most brutal fight in the National Hockey League up to that time. Shore knocked Bailey to the ice with such force that Bailey's skull was fractured. Bailey required emergency surgery and would never play again.
- The entire collection of the Warburg Institute library of renaissance materials, threatened with destruction by Germany's Nazi government because Director Fritz Saxl was Jewish, was moved from Hamburg to London, as its staff of art historians fled on two freighters. The irreplaceable collection now resides at the University of London.
- All German press services were merged into the DNB (Deutsches Nachrichtenbüro) or German News Bureau, which was supervised by the press department within the Propaganda Ministry.
- Died: Antonín Švehla, 60, Prime Minister of Czechoslovakia from 1922 to 1929.

== December 13, 1933 (Wednesday) ==
- William H. Woodin, U.S. President Roosevelt's first Secretary of the Treasury, resigned effective December 30, after a decline in health that began shortly after he had taken office in March. He had been battling a staph infection for months, years before penicillin would become generally available, and would die less than five months after leaving office.
- The Nazi sponsored film Hans Westmar premiered in Berlin after substantial revision on the orders of Propaganda Minister Joseph Goebbels. Originally adapted from the life story of Nazi martyr Horst Wessel, the film was re-edited and the name of the title character was changed.
- Born:
  - Lou Adler, American record producer; in Chicago

== December 14, 1933 (Thursday) ==
- The German chemical conglomerate IG Farben signed an agreement with the Reich Economic Ministry to produce 2.5 million barrels of synthetic gasoline annually in return for government financing of the process of hydrogenation of German coal.

== December 15, 1933 (Friday) ==
- The India national cricket team hosted a test cricket match for the first time in its history, after having played in England the year before. Over a period of four days in Bombay (now Mumbai), India lost to England by nine wickets. India had become the sixth national team to be granted test status the year before by the Imperial Cricket Conference, joining the United Kingdom, Australia, South Africa, the West Indies and New Zealand.
- The anarchist insurrection of December 1933 was suppressed in Zaragoza, Spain, and its leaders are arrested.
- The Newspaper Guild, the first labor union for newspaper journalists in the U.S., was founded.
- Born: Tim Conway, American actor and comedian; as Thomas Daniel Conway in Willoughby, Ohio (d. 2019)

== December 16, 1933 (Saturday) ==
- Diego Martínez Barrio resigned from his post as Prime Minister of Spain. He was replaced the next day by Alejandro Lerroux.
- Died:
  - Robert W. Chambers, 58, American novelist, died following surgery.
  - Louis Joseph Vance, 54, American mystery writer, was killed in a fire.

== December 17, 1933 (Sunday) ==
- In the first NFL Championship Game, played between the champions of the new Western and Eastern divisions, the Chicago Bears defeated the New York Giants 23–21 at Chicago's Wrigley Field.
- Reich Bishop Ludwig Müller, the leader of Germany's Protestant Reich Church, ordered that the 700,000 children and teenagers, who had been part of the church's Evangelical Youth Movement, be placed under the control of the Hitler Youth and its leader, Baldur von Schirach.
- "Seasin's Greetinks!", a Popeye theatrical cartoon short starring voice actors William "Billy" Costello as Popeye, Bonnie Poe as Olive Oyl and Charles Lawrence as Wimpy, was released eight days before Christmas. The "Popeye the Sailor" series of theatrical cartoons would be distributed by Paramount Pictures regularly until 1957.
- Born: Walter Booker, Irish-born American jazz bassist; in Bracknagh (d. 2006)
- Died:
  - Thubten Gyatso, 13th Dalai Lama, 54, after 38 years as supreme leader of the Buddhists of Tibet. According to the beliefs of his followers, he was reincarnated, and would be reborn 18 months later as Lhamo Dhondup, who would become Tenzin Gyatso, the 14th Dalai Lama.
  - Oskar Potiorek, 80, last Austro-Hungarian Governor of Bosnia and Herzegovina, co-passenger in the car carrying the Archduke Franz Ferdinand and Archduchess during their assassination in 1914

== December 18, 1933 (Monday) ==
- The 'Asir Province of Saudi Arabia was invaded by Yemen, which also claimed the area. When Yemen refused to withdraw, the Saudis sent troops to the area on March 22, 1934, commencing a brief war between the two Arab kingdoms.
- Germany's Defense Ministry announced a program to increase the size of the army contingent of its peacetime defence forces to 300,000 men in 36 divisions, with a goal of 650,000 men by 1935 and 1.2 million by 1936. When Germany began World War II on September 1, 1939, the army would have 102 divisions and 2,758,000 men.
- Born: Arthur Leigh Allen, the main suspect in the "Zodiac Killer" series of murders; in Honolulu (d. 1992)
- Died: Mary Parker Follett, 65, American management consultant

== December 19, 1933 (Tuesday) ==
- Genrikh Yagoda, the deputy chief of the Soviet Union's OGPU secret police, gave Soviet general secretary Joseph Stalin his recommendations for outlawing male homosexuality across the USSR. After warning that in Moscow and Leningrad, "Pederasts have been recruiting and debauching completely healthy young people, Red Army men, navy men and students... I would consider it essential to issue an appropriate law to make pederasty answerable as a crime. In many ways this will clean up society, will rid it of nonconformists." Stalin then decreed the new law.
- Died:
  - George Jackson Churchward, 76, Chief Mechanical Engineer of Britain's Great Western Railway
  - Friedrich von Ingenohl, 76, commander of the High Seas Fleet of the German Imperial Navy during World War One
  - Herbert Thacker Herr, 57, American mechanical engineer and inventor

== December 20, 1933 (Wednesday) ==
- Romania held elections for its Chamber of Deputies. The official results had been arranged in advance by Premier Ion Duca of the Partidul Naţional Liberal, "who proceeded to assign himself 50.99 percent of the votes and 300 of the 387 seats".
- The first American ambassador to the Soviet Union, William C. Bullitt, was welcomed to Moscow with a banquet conducted at the Kremlin and attended by the Soviet leadership. Bullitt would later report that General Secretary Joseph Stalin kissed him on the mouth, and that Bullitt returned with a kiss on the cheek. Years later, Bullitt would be bitter about the experience and the feeling of having been betrayed by the Soviets.
- Born: Jean Carnahan, U.S. Senator for Missouri 2001–2002 after being elected to succeed her husband, Mel Carnahan; in Washington D.C. (d. 2024)

== December 21, 1933 (Thursday) ==
- The Dominion of Newfoundland, at the time independent of Canada, was returned to direct rule from the United Kingdom with the royal assent of the Newfoundland Act 1933, with the dominion's self-governing status being surrendered in return for its debts being assumed by the United Kingdom.
- Nazi Germany tested its first missile, the Aggregat 1, designed by Wernher von Braun, with its inaugural launch at the Army Research Center at Kummersdorf, near Berlin. The Aggregat 1 exploded on the launching pad half a second after ignition, apparently because of the buildup of flammable propellants between fueling and launch.
- Died:
  - Sir Henry Dickens, 85, British barrister and son of author Charles Dickens, was killed when he was struck by a motorcycle.
  - Tod Sloan, 59, American jockey

== December 22, 1933 (Friday) ==
- Son of Kong, the sequel to the March hit film, was given its premiere across the U.S..
- The film Alice in Wonderland, based on the famous Alice novels by Lewis Carroll, was released with Charlotte Henry in the title role. Stars featured in the film included W. C. Fields, Edna May Oliver, Cary Grant and Gary Cooper.
- Born:
  - Abel Pacheco, President of Costa Rica, 2002–2006; in San José
  - Jim Barnes, American Choctaw Indian writer; in Summerfield, Oklahoma;

== December 23, 1933 (Saturday) ==
- Two hundred people were killed when an express train collided with a slower moving train near Paris, on a rail line between Lagny-sur-Marne and Pomponne. The Paris to Strasbourg express train, moving at 65 miles per hour (105 km/h), crashed into the wooden coaches of a stalled train carrying Christmas shoppers who were returning from Nancy to Château-Thierry. The Strasbourg bound train had been racing through a heavy fog to make up for lost time. After 189 bodies were removed from the scene, another eleven died of their injuries, making the death toll exactly 200.
- The non-aggression pact between the Soviet Union and Poland went into effect after having been signed in Moscow on July 25, 1932. Although both sides agreed "to refrain from all aggressive acts or attack on one another", the Soviet Union invaded and conquered eastern Poland in 1939.
- Born: Akihito of Japan, Emperor of Japan from 1989 to 2019; in Tokyo

== December 24, 1933 (Sunday) ==
- The Archbishop Leon Tourian, who presided over the Eastern Diocese of the Armenian Apostolic Church, was stabbed to death on Christmas Eve, as he was preparing to being services at the Holy Cross Armenian Church.

== December 25, 1933 (Monday) ==
- The former Kaiser Wilhelm II of Germany changed his will with directions that he was not to be buried in Germany until the monarchy was restored. Upon his death in 1941, he would be interred at Doorn in the Netherlands, where he had lived since his abdication in 1918.
- Kid Chocolate (Eligio Montalvo) lost his title as the world junior lightweight champion, after being knocked out in the seventh round by Frankie Klick in Philadelphia.
- Born:
  - Phan Văn Khải, Prime Minister of Vietnam from 1997 to 2006; near Saigon (now Ho Chi Minh City) (d. 2018)
  - Fred Sasakamoose, Canadian ice hockey player, the first NHL player from the First Peoples (Cree), playing for the Chicago Black Hawks in 1954; at Ahtahkakoop 104, Saskatchewan (d. 2020).
- Died: Francesc Macià, 74, Spanish Catalan politician who briefly served in 1931 as President of the Catalan Republic, and later led the autonomous government in Catalonia

== December 26, 1933 (Tuesday) ==
- Edwin H. Armstrong was granted four United States patents (No. 1,941,066 through 1,941,069) for his invention of frequency modulation devices for what would become "FM radio".
- The Nissan Motor Company was organized by Yoshisuke Aikawa in Tokyo as Jidosha-Seizo Kabushiki-Kaisha, to acquire the existing manufacture of Datsun automobiles from Tobata Casting Company. The Nissan name would be adopted on June 1, 1934.
- Born:
  - Caroll Spinney, American puppeteer who performed the role of "Big Bird" on TV's Sesame Street, and was the voice for "Oscar the Grouch"; in Waltham, Massachusetts (d. 2019)
  - Ugly Dave Gray (stage name for Graham David Taylor), Australian TV actor and game show host
- Died: Eduard Vilde, 78, Estonian writer

== December 27, 1933 (Wednesday) ==
- The Codex Sinaiticus, dating from about 360 AD and containing the oldest complete manuscript of the New Testament, was acquired by the British Museum. The manuscript, which had been owned by the National Library of Russia since 1859, was purchased from the Soviet Union for £100,000, half of which was from private donations.

== December 28, 1933 (Thursday) ==
- In an address at the annual Woodrow Wilson Foundation dinner in Washington, President Roosevelt announced a change in American foreign policy, declaring that "the definite policy of the United States from now on is one opposed to armed intervention."
- Born:
  - Charles Portis, American novelist best known for writing True Grit; in El Dorado, Arkansas (d. 2020)
  - John Y. Brown Jr., American entrepreneur who built the Kentucky Fried Chicken restaurant chain into an international operation, and served as Governor of Kentucky 1979–1983; in Lexington, Kentucky (d. 2022)

== December 29, 1933 (Friday) ==
- Ion G. Duca, the Prime Minister of Romania, was assassinated at the railway station in Sinaia by Nicholas Constantinescu, a 26-year-old university student and member of the recently outlawed Iron Guard. At 10:20 pm local time, Constantinescu walked up to the Prime Minister, who was waiting for a train to Bucharest, and shot Duca four times.
- Flying Down to Rio, a musical film, was released by RKO Pictures. Although the leading lady and leading man were Dolores del Río and Gene Raymond, the film marked the first pairing of dancers Ginger Rogers and Fred Astaire.
- Born: Norman Morrison, American anti-war activist; in Erie, Pennsylvania. On November 2, 1965, Morrison would perform a fatal self-immolation, sitting down in front of the Pentagon, dousing himself with kerosene, setting himself ablaze to protest the Vietnam War.

== December 30, 1933 (Saturday) ==
- A new world's record for longest flight in an airplane was set by two female pilots, Helen Richey and Frances Marsalis who had been piloting their aircraft, the October Girl (a Curtiss Thrush), since December 20. After 236 hours aloft with mid-air refueling, the two touched down at 10:46 a.m. local time in Miami, Florida.
- Ten people were killed in the crash of an Imperial Airways airliner that had been on its way from Brussels to London. The pilot had been flying at low altitude in a heavy fog and crashed into a radio tower at the Belgian town of Ruiselede.
- The lowest temperature ever recorded in the U.S. state of Vermont was recorded at Bloomfield, where it was measured at −50 °F (−46 °C). The record high of 105 °F had been set on July 4, 1911.

== December 31, 1933 (Sunday) ==
- The Polikarpov I-16 airplane, which was the first fighter aircraft of its kind and would become the most used plane in the Soviet Air Force, was given its first test flight
- Australia's national rugby team, the Kangaroos, defeated a team of Rugby Football League stars from England, 63–13, in a game at the Stade Pershing in Paris in a match that one historian called "the birth of rugby league in France"; a French league, the LFRT, would be founded in April.
