= November 1933 =

Month of 1933

<<	November 1933					>>
Su	Mo	Tu	We	Th	Fr	Sa
			1	2	3	4
5	6	7	8	9	10	11
12	13	14	15	16	17	18
19	20	21	22	23	24	25
26	27	28	29	30

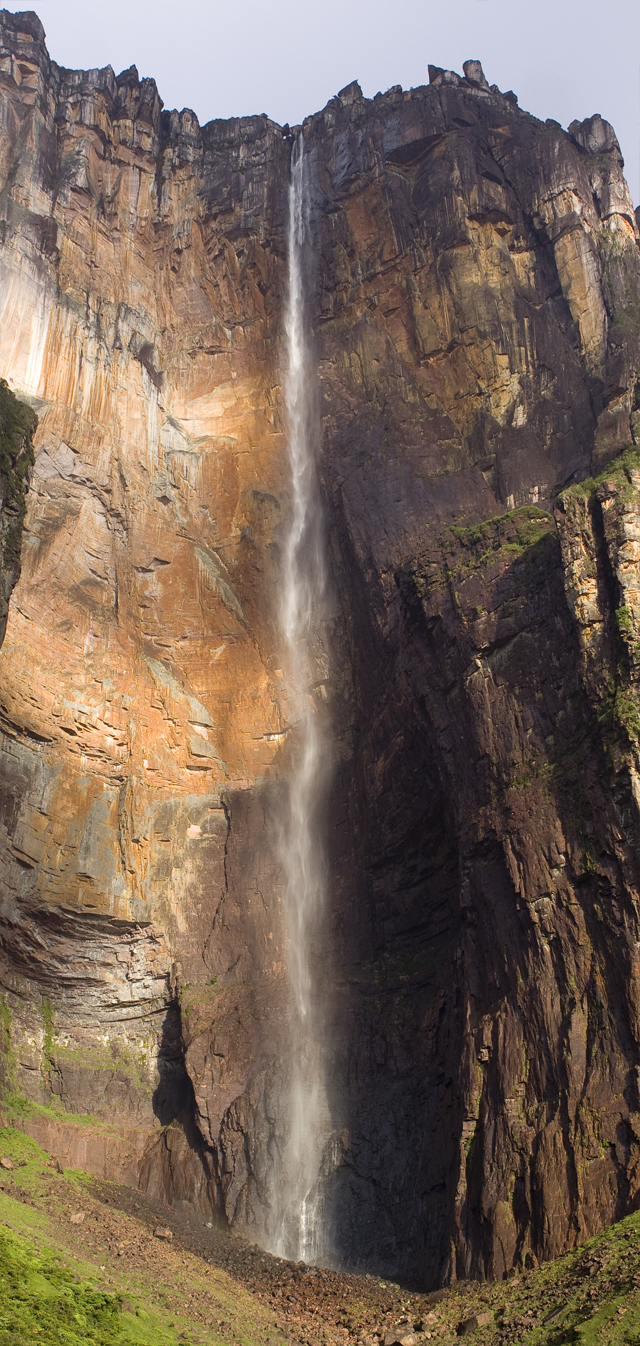
November 16, 1933: Jimmy Angel "discovers" Angel Falls in Venezuela

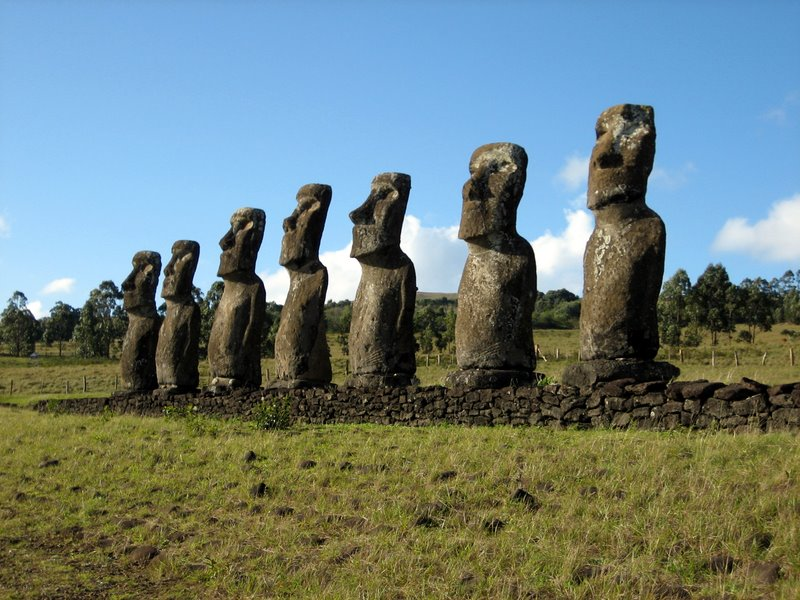
November 11, 1933: Williamson-Balfour Company turns Easter Island over to Chile

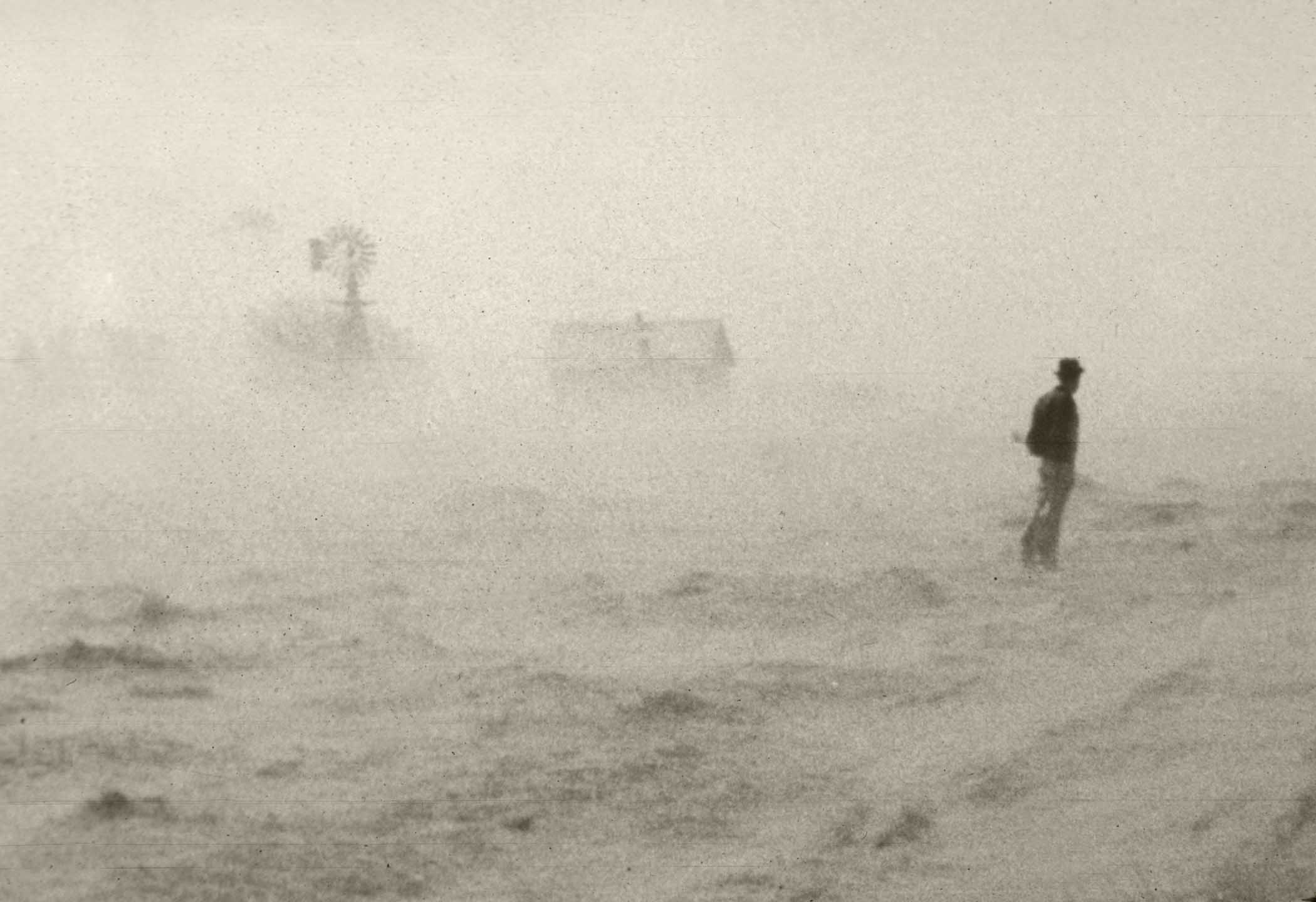
November 11, 1933: "Dust Bowl" storms begin in the United States

The following events occurred in November 1933:

== November 1, 1933 (Wednesday) ==
- The regulations for Germany's Dachau concentration camp were put into effect by its commander, Theodor Eicke, and used as a blueprint for other camps. Under Article 12, people who refused to work, or shouted while on the job, were to be shot immediately.
- Born:
  - Huub Oosterhuis, Dutch theologian; in Amsterdam (d. 2023)
  - Samir Roychoudhury, Indian Bengali poet and philosopher of Hungry generation; in Panihati, Bengal Province (now India's West Bengal state), British India (d. 2016)

== November 2, 1933 (Thursday) ==
- Home rule in Malta, at the time a British colony, was suspended after the Nationalist Party continued to advocate Italian as an official language to be used in schools and court proceedings, in order to strengthen ties to Fascist Italy. Authority over the islands was returned to the British Governor, General David Campbell.
- Eleanor Roosevelt, the First Lady of the United States, opened the White House Conference on the Emergency Needs of Women.
- Born: H. Jay Dinshah, founder of the American Vegan Society, and the first President of the Vegetarian Union of North America; in Malaga, New Jersey (d. 2000)

== November 3, 1933 (Friday) ==
- The United States and Haiti signed a treaty of friendship.
- Born:
  - Michael Dukakis, American politician and 1988 Democratic Presidential nominee; in Brookline, Massachusetts
  - Ken Berry, American TV actor who portrayed Sam Jones on The Andy Griffith Show and Mayberry R.F.D.; in Moline, Illinois (d. 2018)
  - Aneta Corsaut, American TV actress best known as Helen Crump on The Andy Griffith Show; in Hutchinson, Kansas (d. 1995)
  - Jeremy Brett, British TV actor best known for portraying Sherlock Holmes; in Berkswell, Warwickshire (d. 1995)
  - John Barry, British film score composer for the original James Bond films, in York (d. 2011)
  - Amartya Sen, Indian economist and 1998 Nobel laureate, in Santiniketan
- Died: Pierre Paul Émile Roux, 69, French physician and immunologist who created the cure for diphtheria

== November 4, 1933 (Saturday) ==
- Otto Fischer of Germany became the first person to be launched in a manned rocket, lifting off from the island of Rügen in a liquid oxygen and gasoline fueled missile, rapidly ascending to an altitude of six miles, and then returning to earth by parachute ten minutes later.
- Sally Rand, who had attained fame doing the suggestive "fan dance", announced that she was giving up her signature routine.
- Born:
  - Charles K. Kao, Chinese-born physicist known as the "Father of Fiber Optic Communications"; in Shanghai (d. 2018);
  - Didier Ratsiraka, President of Madagascar from 1975 to 1993 and from 1997 to 2002; in Vatomandry (d. 2021);
  - Odumegwu Ojukwu, Nigerian general who led the abortive secession of Biafra from 1967 to 1970; in Zungeru (d. 2011)
  - Mildred McDaniel, American track athlete who held the women's world record for the high jump; in Atlanta (d. 2004)
- Died: John Jay Chapman, 81, American author

== November 5, 1933 (Sunday) ==
- In Spain, Basque voters in the provinces of Vizcaya, Alava and Guipuzcoa approved a resolution for an autonomous republic within the nation.
- Nearly 300 troops from Paraguay were killed in battle at Fort Arce in their war against Bolivia.
- Five people died when an airplane crashed into their home near Red Bank, New Jersey.
- Died:
  - Texas Guinan, 49, American club operator keeper and actress who operated the "300 Club" during prohibition, died of amoebic dysentery
  - Sen Katayama, 73, founder of the Japanese Communist Party

== November 6, 1933 (Monday) ==
- In Portugal, Decree number 23,203 from Prime Minister António de Oliveira Salazar established the Special Military Court (TME) which could convict people of any action deemed subversive, including the spreading of rumors or the organizing of strikes.
- British Prime Minister Ramsay MacDonald said in a speech to his cabinet of ministers and party leaders that the United States was becoming a dictatorship, commenting, "We must always look out for the backwash. It will be interesting to see what the backwash will be in America and Germany by next April.
- Born:
  - Knut Johannesen, Norwegian speed-skater, Olympic gold medalist 1960 and 1964; in Oslo
  - Else Ackermann, German physician and pharmacologist; in Berlin (d. 2019)
- Died: Polly Bemis, 80, Chinese-born American pioneer whose story was made into a novel and a 1991 film, Thousand Pieces of Gold

== November 7, 1933 (Tuesday) ==
- Mohandas K. Gandhi began a 12,500 mile, nine month tour of India to promote the cause of ending prejudice against the Harijan ("Untouchable") caste.
- The United States and Saudi Arabia signed their first treaty; in the initial agreement, they granted each other most favored nation status in trade.
- Kentucky, Pennsylvania, Ohio, Utah all voted in favor of repealing the 18th Amendment in general elections, but North Carolina and South Carolina became the first two states to vote to continue to ban liquor sales. The four new states brought the total number of ratifications to 37, one short of the 38 necessary.
- Voters in most Pennsylvania cities approved the repeal of a ban on Sunday sports, paving the way for the new NFL franchises in Pittsburgh and Philadelphia to operate.
- Born: Abdallah Laroui, Moroccan historian; in Azemmour
- Died: Andrey Lyapchev, 66, former Prime Minister of Bulgaria from 1926 to 1931

== November 8, 1933 (Wednesday) ==
- Mohammed Nadir Shah, the King of Afghanistan since 1929, was assassinated by Abdul Khaliq, a 17-year-old student who shot the King at an awards ceremony at the Royal Palace in Kabul. Khaliq was avenging the execution of his adoptive father, Ghulam Nabi Charki, who had been put to death on the King's orders exactly a year earlier. The King was succeeded by his 19-year-old son, Mohammed Zahir Shah, who would rule until 1973.

== November 9, 1933 (Thursday) ==
- As part of his New Deal programs, U.S. President Franklin D. Roosevelt issued Executive Order 6420-B, creating the Civil Works Administration, an organization designed to create jobs for more than 4 million of the unemployed.
- Brooke Hart, the 22-year-old son of a department store owner in San Jose, California, was kidnapped by two men as he was leaving work for the day. The men beat Hart to death, dropped his body from a bridge, and then called the Hart family to demand a ransom of $40,000 for his safe return.
- Jamil al-Midfai became the new Prime Minister of Iraq
- Born: Jim Perry (stage name for James Edward Dooley), American game show host known for $ale of the Century; in Camden, New Jersey (d. 2015)
- Died: William Dick, 76, U.S. Mohican Indian believed to be the last person who could speak the Mohican language, which was never written down.

== November 10, 1933 (Friday) ==
- The first sitdown strike in the United States during the depression took place when workers at the Hormel food processing factory in Austin, Minnesota, halted work and occupied the plant for three days.
- Thousands of angry farmers marched into the town of Marshall, Minnesota, seized control of the Swift and Company chicken processing plant as part of a farm strike to protest against mortgage foreclosures on farms as part of the activities of the "Farm Holiday Association".
- Born:
  - Don Clarke, New Zealand rugby union football player and cricketer, nicknamed "The Boot"; in Pihama (d. 2002)
  - Ronald Evans, American astronaut who flew the command module on Apollo 17, the last crewed mission to the Moon; in St. Francis, Kansas (d. 1990)
  - Alexander Bessmertnykh, Foreign Minister of the Soviet Union 1990–1991; in Biysk
- Died: Hugh Trevor (born Hugh Edwin Trevor-Thomas), 30, American actor, from complications following appendectomy)

== November 11, 1933 (Saturday) ==
- The first dust storm in the "Dust Bowl", an area that experienced a long series of such wind storms, swept through South Dakota and stripped away almost all of the loose topsoil by the end of the first day, and making the skies black by the second day. The storms would continue throughout the 1930s.
- Girl Scout cookies, according to one source, were created when the Girl Scouts of Greater Philadelphia were baking treats on the Armistice Day holiday, as a community project to benefit day care centers. Passers by the kitchen at 1401 Arch Street in Philadelphia asked about buying the cookies, and the money raised inspired the girls to repeat the project the next autumn, with the Keebler Company making a special vanilla shortbread cookie in the shape of the Girl Scout emblem.
- Control of Easter Island was transferred from the Compania Explotadora de la Isla de Pascua (CEDIP), a subsidiary of the Williamson-Balfour Company, to the Republic of Chile.
- In Austria, a decree by dictator Engelbert Dollfuss provided for prompt judgment and sentencing for people charged with murder, arson or damage of state property.
- The Dow Jones Composite Average was introduced, combining the Industrial, Transportation and Utility Averages.
- Born: Miriam Tlali, the first black South African woman to publish a novel, starting with Muriel at Metropolitan in 1979; in Doornfontein, Johannesburg (d. 2017)

== November 12, 1933 (Sunday) ==
- Voters in Germany overwhelmingly approved Adolf Hitler's decision to withdraw from the League of Nations. Of the 43.5 million who participated in the plebiscite- reported as 97% of those eligible- 42,735,059 voted "yes" on the proposal to leave the League and 737,676 no. The slate of Nazi candidates for the Reichstag also received 92% of the vote, with 39,655,224 voting in favor and 3,398,249 against.
- The Eastern Turkestan Republic was established by Uyghurs, Kazakhs, Kyrgyz, Uzbeks, and Tatars as an Islamic republic, with Khoja Niyaz as the first President and Sabit Damolla as the Prime Minister. The Republic lasted until April 16, 1934, when it was overthrown by joint Soviet and Chinese forces.
- The Precision Optical Industry, as predecessor for Canon, founded in Tokyo, Japan.
- The NFL Pittsburgh Pirates lost 32–0 to the NFL Brooklyn Dodgers, and the Philadelphia Eagles tied the Chicago Bears, 3–3, in the first Sunday home games for both teams, days after Pennsylvania voters removed a ban on paid sporting events on the Christian Sabbath Day.
- The first purported photograph of the Loch Ness monster was taken by Hugh Gray, who was able only to snap a picture of Nessie's torso, as its head was underwater at the time.
- Born: Jalal Talabani, President of Iraq from 2006 to 2014; in Kelkan village of the Kurdistan region (d. 2017)

== November 13, 1933 (Monday) ==
- The first rally of Germany's Protestant Reich Church was held at the Sports Palace in Berlin, and attracted 20,000 German Christians, but a speech by the keynote speaker, Berlin church leader Reinhold Krause, was so extreme in its anti-Semitism that it discredited the Nazi-supported institution. Dr. Krause advocated the removal of the Old Testament, "with its cheap Jewish morality of exchange and its stories of cattle traders and pimps" from German Bibles as well as "the teachings of the 'Rabbi Paul'" from the New Testament, and de-emphasizing symbols of the crucifixion and of a "meek and suffering" Christ. Krause clarified his remarks days later by saying that "It is true that I reject the Old Testament as having no meaning for the Nordic race and I do not accept efforts to explain Christ in terms of Old Testament prophesies... but I never decried the use of the crucifix. What I actually said on that point was the following: That we must demand a return to the heroic Jesus whose life was an example to us and whose death is a seal upon a life of heroism and struggle. We must be careful, however, not to exaggerate Christ crucified."
- Bulgarian Communist Georgi Dimitrov was acquitted of charges of plotting the Reichstag fire of February, though still detained in jail on other charges. After his release in February, he would return to Bulgaria, and become that nation's Prime Minister in 1946.
- Alexandru Vaida-Voevod, the Prime Minister of Romania, resigned along with his entire cabinet, and was not asked to stay by King Michael.
- The science fiction horror film The Invisible Man starring Claude Rains was released to theaters everywhere, previously only shown on October 31 at the Kiva Theater at Greeley, Colorado.

== November 14, 1933 (Tuesday) ==
- Franz von Papen, the Vice-Chancellor of Nazi Germany, was appointed as the Reich Commissioner for the Saar to administer the League of Nations territory of Saarland, which was scheduled for a 1935 plebiscite to determine whether it would become part of France or Germany, or remain a League territory.
- Eskimo, produced by Hunt Stromberg, W. S. Van Dyke and Irving Thalberg as the first feature film with dialogue almost entirely in a Native American language, made its debut, and would win the first Academy Award for Best Film Editing. The movie was filmed at six locations in the U.S. Alaska Territory and the Eskimo actors were heard speaking in their native tongue, Inupiaq.
- S. A. Goodman, owner of the Memphis Tigers independent professional football team, announced plans for formation of a new circuit, the American Professional Football League, to begin play in 1934 as a rival to the existing National Football League. The six-team league would play the 1934 season with teams in Charlotte, Dallas, Louisville, Memphis, St. Louis and Tulsa.
- Born: Fred Haise, American astronaut who flew in Apollo 13; in Biloxi, Mississippi
- Died: Thomas Mawson, 72, British city planner and landscape designer

== November 15, 1933 (Wednesday) ==
- Germany's new "Chamber of Culture", Reichskulturkammer, was opened by Propaganda Minister Joseph Goebbels in a ceremony at the Berlin Philharmonic Hall. Goebbels summed up the Nazi view in the inaugural speech, stating that "Culture is the highest expression of the creative forces of a nation, and the artist is its qualified inspirer", whose "mission" was to further the national interest.
- The first elections in the history of Thailand were conducted by local officials who gathered in the governors' offices in their respective provinces to choose candidates. Direct elections were not to take place until more than half of the Thai population completed at least four years of primary education.
- The British freighter Saxilby capsized in a storm off of the coast of Ireland. The crew of 27 sent an S.O.S. and abandoned the ship for a lifeboat, but were never found.
- Born: Jack Burns, American comedian who was with the team of "Burns and Carlin" (with George Carlin) and then "Burns and Schreiber") with Avery Schreiber; in Boston (d. 2020)
- Died: William K. Vanderbilt III, 26, American businessman, was killed when the car he was being chauffeured in crashed into a parked fruit truck near Ridgeland, South Carolina

== November 16, 1933 (Thursday) ==
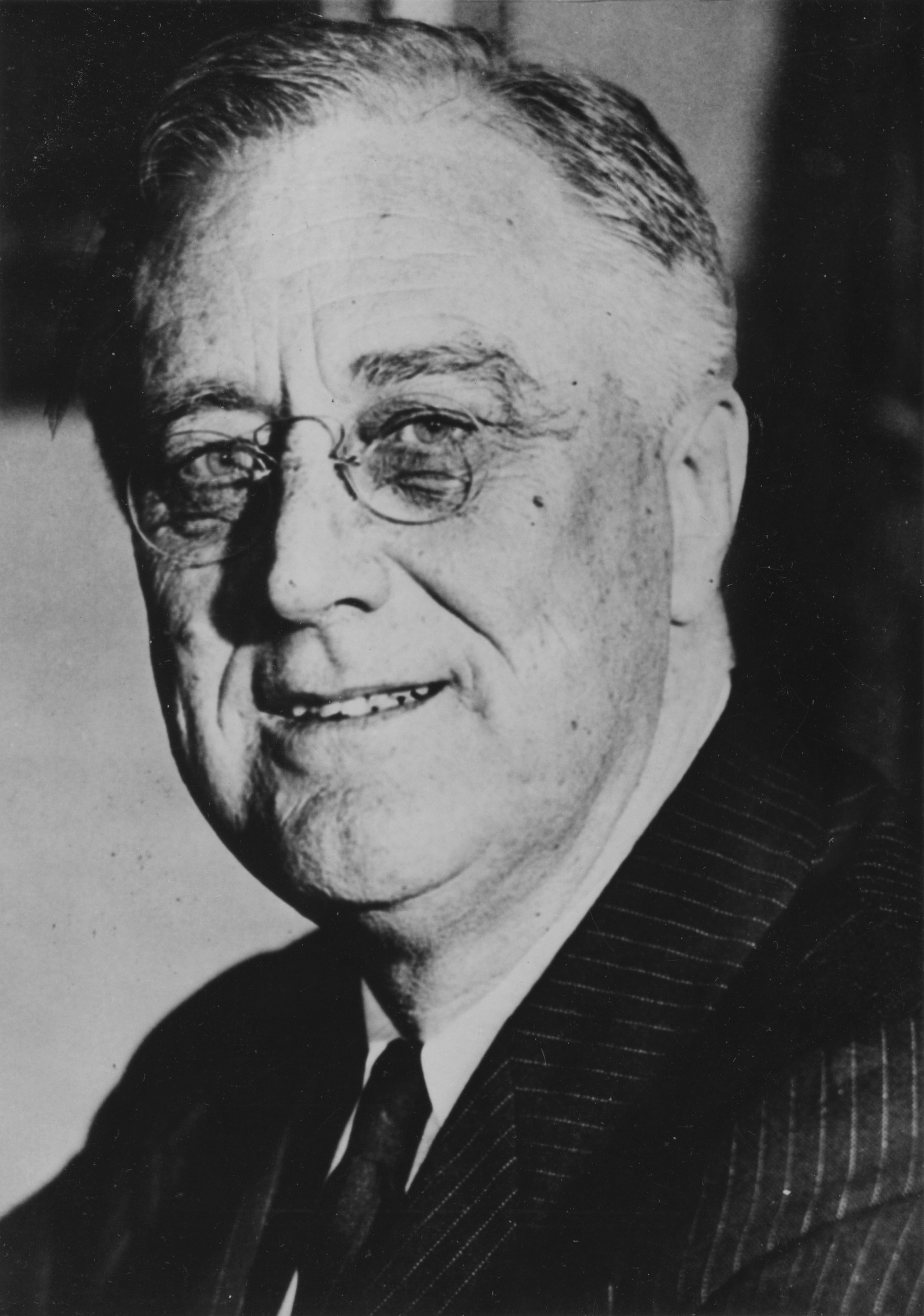
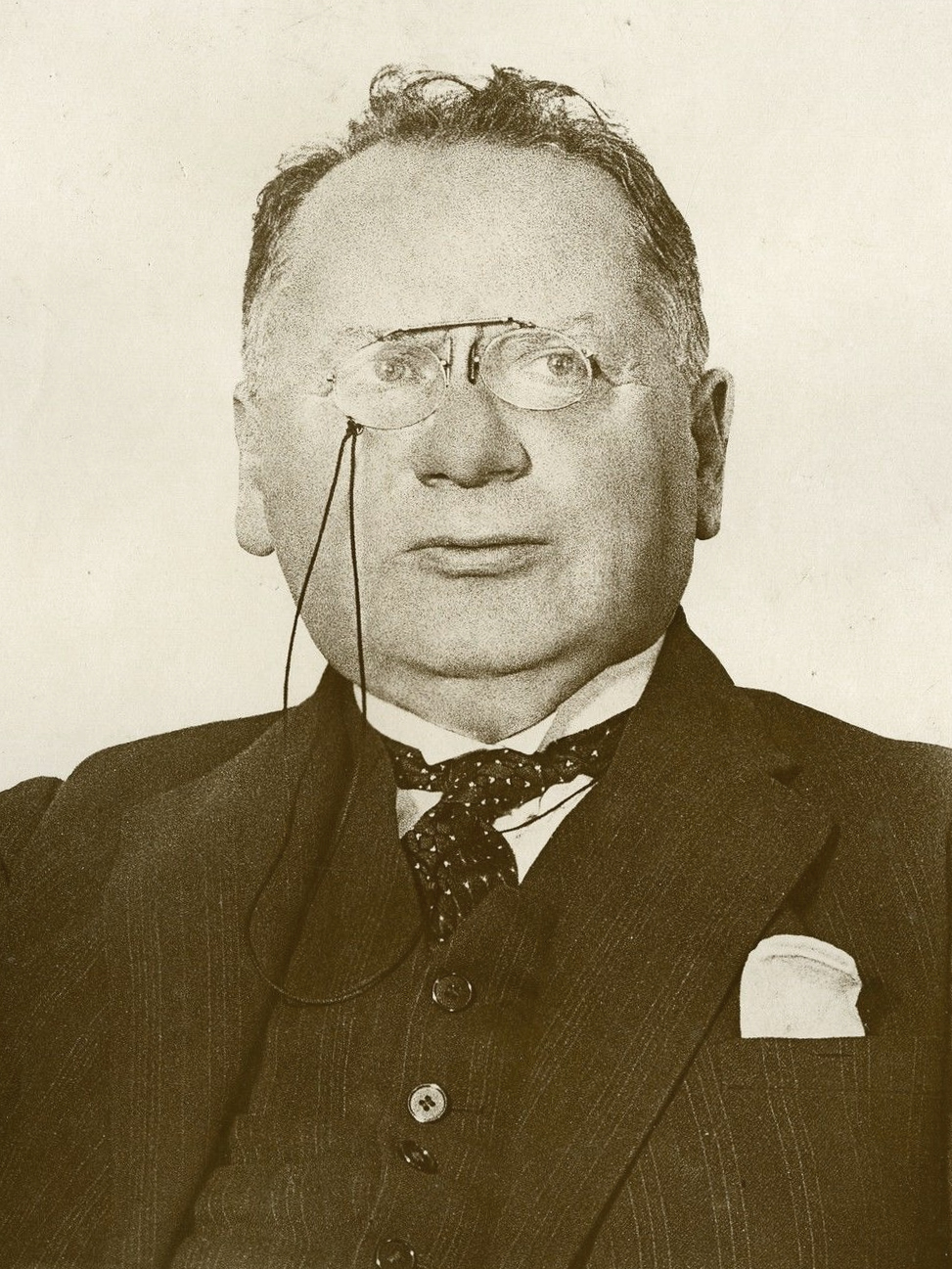
Roosevelt and Litvinov
- The United States and the Soviet Union established formal diplomatic relations. President Roosevelt wrote to Soviet Foreign Minister Maxim Litvinov, "I am very happy to inform you that as a result of our conversations, the Government of the United States has decided to establish normal diplomatic relations with the Government of the Union of Soviet Socialist Republics and to exchange Ambassadors." The exchange of letters formalizing the agreement took place at 11:50 pm in Washington D.C. at the White House.
- Thomas Thurmond and J. M. Holmes, who had kidnapped and murdered Brooke Hart a week earlier, then demanded a ransom from the family, were caught making another phone call to the Hart home. They confessed to the crime, explaining that they killed the 22-year-old man because they didn't want to risk his escape.
- Angel Falls in Venezuela, the world's highest waterfall, was "discovered" by American pilot Jimmie Angel, who became the first person to fly over the landmark in an airplane and observe its height of nearly 1,000 meters (over 3,200 feet), and for whom the falls were named, rather than for celestial angels. The falls had been known to the Pemon tribe as Parakupá Vená.
- The drama film Little Women starring Katharine Hepburn, Joan Bennett and Frances Dee was released.

== November 17, 1933 (Friday) ==
- U.S. President Roosevelt announced the recognition of the Soviet Union, and the appointment of William C. Bullitt as the first American Ambassador to the U.S.S.R.; Alexander Troyanovsky would become the first Soviet Ambassador to the United States.
- The comedy film Duck Soup starring the Marx Brothers was released.

== November 18, 1933 (Saturday) ==
- W. D. Jones, the 17-year-old Texan who had been a gunman for the gang of Bonnie and Clyde before leaving to return home, was arrested after being discovered working on a farm near Houston. Jones provided detailed information about the Barrow Gang's activities between December 1932 and August 1933, and, after spending 15 years in a state prison for being an accessory to murders and kidnappings, provided interviews to biographers. Jones would survive until being killed in a gunfight in 1974 at the age of 58.
- The Japanese Army began a 16-day battle with Korean nationalists in the Yanji region, on the border between China and what is now North Korea; at the time, Korea and Manchuria were under the control of the Japanese Empire. Over 500 guerillas were killed, as well as 150 Japanese.

== November 19, 1933 (Sunday) ==
- Parliamentary elections were held in Spain, the first in which women were allowed to vote. General elections gave no party a majority in the 473 seats of the Cortes. The Radical Republican Party, led by Alejandro Lerroux, won 102 seats and was able to form a coalition with other right-wing parties and replaced the leftist government of Manuel Azaña.
- Born: Larry King, American talk show host on radio and TV; as Lawrence Zeiger in Brooklyn (d. 2021)

== November 20, 1933 (Monday) ==
- The largest earthquake ever recorded within the Arctic Circle struck within Baffin Bay in Canada with a 7.4 magnitude. However, the quake caused no damage because of its offshore location and the sparsity of population along the Bay's shores, and was felt only in the Greenland town of Upernavik.
- The Fukien rebellion began as officers and soldiers of the 19th Route Army, led by General Chen Mingshu revolted against their superiors in China's National Revolutionary Army, and attempted to set up a rebel government in the Fujian Province in southeast China.
- Two months after a team from the Soviet Union had taken a balloon to more than 60,000 feet in altitude, Lt. Cdr. Tex Settle of the U.S. Navy and Major Chester Fordney of the U.S. Marines took the Century of Progress to 61,237 feet. As one author observed, "The space race between the United States and the Soviet Union had begun."

== November 21, 1933 (Tuesday) ==
- The first report of an experiment in acoustic emission was delivered, when Professor Kishinoue of the Imperial University of Tokyo described his measurement of the vibrations of a wooden beam being cracked under outside stress.
- Born:
  - Henry Hartsfield, American astronaut on four space shuttle missions; in Birmingham, Alabama (d. 2014)
  - Jean Shepard, American country singer; in Pauls Valley, Oklahoma (d. 2016)
  - Beryl Bainbridge, British novelist; in Liverpool (d. 2010)
  - Etta Zuber Falconer, African-American mathematician; in Tupelo, Mississippi (d. 2002)

== November 22, 1933 (Wednesday) ==
- Gangsters Bonnie and Clyde (Bonnie Parker and Clyde Barrow) were both wounded in an ambush set up near Sowers, Texas, by the Dallas County Sheriff's Office, but escaped. Despite having three tires flattened and the steering wheel damaged, Clyde Barrow stole another car four miles down the road and escaped to Oklahoma, where bullets were removed from their legs.
- The Fujian People's Government was declared in Fujian Province, China.
- Died: Mahmud Tarzi, 68, Afghanistan intellectual and journalist

== November 23, 1933 (Thursday) ==
- Captains of 17 of England's 2- first-class county cricket teams met and voted, 14–3, in favor of a resolution banning the controversial "bodyline" pitch that had injured two players in January. The Imperial Cricket Conference would approve a similar resolution on July 25.
- Born:
  - Krzysztof Penderecki, Polish composer; in Dębica (d. 2020)
  - Ali Shariati, Iranian scholar; in Kahak, Razavi Khorasan (d. 1977)

== November 24, 1933 (Friday) ==
- Adolf Hitler signed "the world's most comprehensive animal protection legislation" which outlawed various inhumane practices against animals used in industry and medicine. As war crimes prosecutors would note later at the Nuremberg Trials, the same regime tolerated and promoted cruelty to human beings interned in concentration camps.
- The Law Against Dangerous Habitual Criminals (Gewohnheitsverbrechergesetz) was passed in Germany, providing for indefinite confinement of any person deemed by court experts to be a "habitual criminal", even after that person's criminal sentence had been served. A criminal who had been charged at least three times (even if not convicted) could, if declared to be potentially dangerous, be placed in "security confinement" (Sicherungsverwahrte) or castrated or sterilized to prevent the passing on of the disposition toward crime.

== November 25, 1933 (Saturday) ==
- GIRD-X, the first Soviet Union rocket to be powered entirely by liquid propellant (a combination of liquid oxygen and gasoline), was launched and reached an altitude of 4,880 meters (slightly more than three miles or 16,000 feet) for a new national record.
- Born:
  - Lenny Moore, American NFL player and Pro Football Hall of Fame inductee; in Reading, Pennsylvania;
  - Kathryn Crosby, American actress and second wife of Bing Crosby; as Olive Kathryn Grandstaff in Houston (d. 2024)
- Died: Hans Otto, 33, German stage actor, nine days after the Nazi SS arrested him at a cafe in Charlottenburg. The official statement from the Nazi Party was that Otto had committed suicide by jumping from a window, but Otto had sustained a double fracture of the skull during torture by his captors.

== November 26, 1933 (Sunday) ==
- J. M. Holmes and Thomas M. Thurmond, in jail in San Jose, California, and awaiting trial for the November 9 kidnapping and murder of Brooke Hart, were seized by a lynch mob, taken to a city park, and hanged. Hart's body washed ashore later that day.
- The Seventh-day Adventist Church was banned in Germany and the property of the German SDA organization (the Siebenten-Tags-Adventisten) was confiscated. Although a Protestant Christian denomination, Adventist church adhered to Old Testament rules also used in Jewish worship, including the observance of the Sabbath on Saturday, and the avoidance of pork. The ban would be lifted on appeal, but Adventists who were conscientious objectors were persecuted.
- Born:
  - Robert Goulet, American singer and actor; in Lawrence, Massachusetts (died October 30, 2007)
  - Puntsagiin Jasrai, Prime Minister of Mongolia from 1992 to 1997; in Bugat (d. October 25, 2007)
  - Tony Verna, American TV producer and inventor of instant replay; in Philadelphia (d. 2015)

== November 27, 1933 (Monday) ==
- A break in the Lindbergh kidnapping case was realized when a teller at a New York City bank came across one of the gold certificates that had been part of the ransom money delivered to the kidnapper. The bill was part of the cash in the night deposit box at the Corn Exchange Bank and Trust, in Greenwich Village, from the Sheridan movie theater, two blocks away. The cashier recalled the man who had bought a ticket to Broadway Through A Keyhole the night before, because he had paid with a five dollar gold note rather than a regular bill, had folded the bill four times, and thrown it through the opening of the booth. The cashier, Miss Cecile Barr, would later be a witness against Bruno Hauptmann when he was put on trial for the Lindbergh baby's kidnapping and murder.
- The first nationally publicized backlash against the National Recovery Act, and its "Blue Eagle" emblem, took place in Greensburg, Pennsylvania, when the vast majority of restaurant operators surrendered their NRA cards, protesting that the restaurant competition code was causing them financial ruin. Although the NRA had initially been popular on its introduction in August, enthusiasm for its provisions (as measured by the number of newspaper advertisements displaying the Blue Eagle emblem) began to drop considerably,
- The Code of Fair Competition for the Motion Picture Industry was issued by the National Industrial Recovery Administration for the film industry in Hollywood.
- Born: William G. Dever, American Biblical archaeologist; in Louisville, Kentucky

== November 28, 1933 (Tuesday) ==
- The largest Van de Graaff generator built, with two 15-foot diameter aluminum spheres, on 25-foot tall columns, was demonstrated at the MIT's Round Hill facility at Cambridge, Massachusetts. Professor Robert J. Van de Graaff wowed the crowd by sending seven million volts of electricity between the two spheres.
- Born: Hope Lange, American film and TV actress, 1957 Academy Award winner for Peyton Place and 1970 Emmy Award winner for The Ghost & Mrs. Muir; in Redding, Connecticut (d. 2003)

== November 29, 1933 (Wednesday) ==
- Henri Charrière, André Maturette and Joanes Clousiot escaped from the French penal colony on Devil's Island near French Guiana. The trio would reach a leper colony on Pigeon Island, where they were given a boat and sailed to Colombia, where they were recaptured. After several other escape attempts, they would be extradited back to French Guiana. Charrière eventually escaped to freedom in 1941 and write about his experience in the bestselling book Papillon.
- Born: John Mayall, English blues artist; in Macclesfield, Cheshire (d. 2024)
- Died: Vernon C. Miller, 37, American gangster who had led the "Kansas City massacre" on June 17, was found murdered near Detroit. Miller, whose nude body was found in a ditch, had been killed with 13 blows to the head and strangulation with a garotte, and could be identified only by fingerprints.

== November 30, 1933 (Thursday) ==
- Thanksgiving Day was celebrated on November 30, as a national holiday, for the last time in American history. Historically, the U.S. President proclaimed the last Thursday of November as the holiday, after which department stores would begin the Christmas season. In 1939, President Roosevelt would move the date to the fourth Thursday of November at the request of business leaders, making the holiday on November 23 for the first time. For that year only, the holiday was observed on the 23rd by the federal government, but on the 30th in some U.S. states.
- German Propaganda Minister Goebbels announced that the Berlin Philharmonic Orchestra was to come under government control effective January 15, with each of the members becoming an employee of the Reich.
- Hermann Göring announced that the German Gestapo was to come under his personal control, after having been an agency of the Interior Ministry.
- Died: General Arthur Currie, 57, who commanded the Canadian Corps during World War One, died from pneumonia and complications of a stroke
