= 1934 Swiss public order referendum =

Referendum in Switzerland

11 March 1934

Results
Choice	Votes	%
Yes	419,399	46.19%
No	488,672	53.81%
Valid votes	908,071	98.47%
Invalid or blank votes	14,113	1.53%
Total votes	922,184	100.00%
Registered voters/turnout	1,167,508	78.99%

A referendum on public order was held in Switzerland on 11 March 1934. Voters were asked whether they approved of a federal law on maintaining public order. The proposal was rejected by 53.8% of voters.

== Background ==
The referendum was an optional referendum, which only a majority of the vote, as opposed to the mandatory referendums, which required a double majority; a majority of the popular vote and majority of the cantons.

== Results ==
Choice	Votes	%
For	419,399	46.2
Against	488,672	53.8
Blank votes	11,431	–
Invalid votes	2,682	–
Total	922,184	100
Registered voters/turnout	1,167,508	79.0
Source: Nohlen & Stöver
