= Herbert Thacker Herr =

American engineer and inventor

Herbert Thacker Herr (March 19, 1876 - December 19, 1933) was an American engineer and inventor.

Herr was born in Denver to Theodore W. Herr and Emma Musser Herr. He spent two years working for the Chicago & North Western Railroad as a machinist's apprentice. He attended Yale University, graduating in 1899 from the Sheffield Scientific School, and then worked for the Denver & Rio Grande Railroad as a machinist and draftsman as well as working on the operating schedules. He made improvements to turbines, gas and oil engines, and air brakes during this time.

In 1902 he left to work for the Chicago Great Western Railroad, and also worked for the Atchison, Topeka & Santa Fé and the Norfolk & Western Railroad. In 1906 he became general superintendent of the Denver & Rio Grande Railroad. He left this post for the Duquesne Mining and Reduction Company, where he was general manager; in 1908 he became general manager of the Westinghouse Machine Company, where he was promoted to second vice president, and in 1913 to first vice president. After a corporate merger he was vice president and general manager of the Westinghouse Electric and Manufacturing Company.

His inventions included a device to automatically weigh cars attached to trains. He was awarded the Longstreth Medal in 1914 for his inventions. In 1931 he received the John Scott Medal from the directors of City Trusts for his mechanical innovations.

He died in Philadelphia on December 19, 1933. He was married to Irene Viancourt, who survived him; they had a son, Herbert T. Herr Jr., and a daughter.
