= Francis Oliver Haddock =

American police officer

- Haddock in 1924
- Born: November 14, 1892; Newton, Massachusetts
- Died: February 3, 1934 (aged 41); Needham, Massachusetts
- Cause of death: Gunshot wound, Murder
- Occupation: Police officer
- Employer(s): Needham, Massachusetts

Francis Oliver "Frank" Haddock (November 14, 1892 – February 3, 1934) was an American police officer who, along with fellow patrolman Forbes McLeod (January 1, 1898 – February 2, 1934), were killed in the line of duty while responding to a bank robbery. They were the first two officers in Massachusetts state history to be murdered by an assailant using a sub-machine gun, and the crime attracted attention across the northeastern United States. Their sacrifices are commemorated by the city of Needham, Massachusetts through its Haddock-McLeod Plaza.

== Life ==
Haddock was born in Newton, Massachusetts, the son of William Oliver Haddock (May 12, 1861 – February 7, 1903) and Elizabeth Helen McAdams (March, 1864 – April 22, 1901). His two oldest siblings died in infancy, and he and his older brother Joseph Ernest "Joe" Haddock (February 15, 1891 – January 17, 1954) and younger sister Mary Florence "Mae" Haddock (May 30, 1894 – April 16, 1965) were orphaned upon Ellen’s death in 1901. William had fled from Newton for unknown reasons to Chicago around 1899.

The children were sent to different homes; Mae to her first cousin (twice removed) on her mother’s side Francis Alonso McAdams and his wife Ellen (Slattery), Frank to the home of Mary J. (O’Brien) Kingsbury, and Joe to a local farmer. Apparently, conditions on the farm were harsh, for Frank used to visit Joe, find him hungry, and would sneak back at night with food for him. Kingsbury, the elderly widow of Amasa Kingsbury (whose family were prominent early residents and citizens of Needham) who resided on a farm on Greendale Avenue then on the outskirts of town, alerted authorities and Joe went to live with the McAdams’.

Haddock enlisted in the Army in June, 1917 and spent the remainder of World War I driving an ambulance at Camp Upton, NY, discharged sergeant first class. He had met and then married on Apr. 24, 1919, Helen Frances "Nell" Callanan (October 18, 1893 – October 27, 1979), in Newton. They settled in Needham, and in 1920 he became one of the first full-time officers hired by Needham. There, they raised four daughters, Mary Florence Haddock (March 21, 1920 – June 2, 1987), Helen Veronica Haddock (March 31, 1923 – March 17, 2009), Dorothy Frances Haddock (August 13, 1924 – June 12, 1993), and Phyllis Teresa Haddock (September 1, 1926 – March 9, 2007).

Haddock was a popular member of the force and especially concerned with children, even as he was stern with juvenile delinquents, and family, given the background of own formative years. He would invite them to dine with the family during the Depression years, and until his death coordinated the junior crossing guard program for schools. He enjoyed the close family relations on his wife’s side and especially holidays; at Christmas, he would decorate lavishly the house and yard at 4 River Park Drive (that site now part of an interchange on Massachusetts Route 128, with the house having been moved nearby and still owned by the family). He also liked gardening and typically had a thriving set of flower beds in addition to vegetables during the warmer months. He especially prized bulbs and plants brought back from flower shows across the country by one of Needham’s prominent knitwear manufacturers and philanthropists, William Carter.

== Death ==
At 9:30 AM on Feb. 2, 1934, the Needham Trust Company was robbed by the trio of Murton Millen, Irving Millen, and Abraham Faber. Prior to their exiting the bank, McLeod was shot fatally three times, from a short distance, with Murton Millen the likely triggerman. The bandits took two hostages who they placed on the running board of their car facing the street and proceeded to drive away. Off duty police Sgt. Howard Mills saw them drive off, took down the description of the car and its direction of travel, and called police headquarters at 9:34.

This was in the direction of Needham Heights, which then (since demolished) had a fire station that was part of the beat of Haddock. He happened to be there commiserating with the on-duty firemen after his crossing guard duties when a call came from fire department headquarters about the robbery at 9:45. Informed, Haddock went to the front of the station, pistol drawn, only to hold fire as one hostage (the other having leapt to safety moments earlier) remained on the running board. Machine gun fire came from the car, striking Haddock three times with two mortal wounds. Helped onto a truck and driven to Glover Memorial Hospital, he died there early the next day.

== Legacy ==
The town was shocked by the event. Its offices closed on Feb. 5 for the funeral of McLeod, and Feb. 6 for that of Haddock and hundreds turned out in bitterly cold weather with snow on the ground. Both days a parade of officers escorted the coffins through town in the funeral processions. At that time there was no formal pension plan for officers, but the Needham Citizens’ Committee granted a payment of $50 a month for Haddock’s family that would last for the remainder of his wife’s life; she never remarried. The incident also spurred the cash-strapped town government to buy more equipment for the department and to hire more officers.

In 2001, the town decided to rename the plaza in front of police headquarters after the two slain officers. A ceremony on May 15, attended by the two surviving daughters Helen Sadow and Phyllis Murphy and by other relatives, dedicated a plaque in their honor. For many years prior and continuing since, pencil drawings of the officers have hung in the station itself.

In 2009 on the 75th anniversary of the event, in conjunction with the Needham Historical Society, a memorial to the officers was placed at the site, the plaque having disappeared. Of Haddock’s children only Helen Sadow, who would live just six weeks more, remained alive but was too ill to travel, however his great grandson Brian Barnicle (daughter Mary's grandson) attended with his wife Crystale and two children Sahsha and James.

Within days of the crime, Faber was apprehended, followed by the Millens and Murton Millen’s wife Norma, who had waited in the getaway car. A trial quickly followed establishing their guilt of the murder of McLeod and on Jun. 7, 1935, the Millen brothers and Faber were executed. Norma Millen was convicted of being an accessory to the crimes and was sentenced to a year of imprisonment.

The robbery and aftermath was featured as "The Millen-Faber Case" in Issue #24 of True Crime Comics, published in November, 1942. A documentary about the crime, by Risner Productions, appeared on the local Needham public access channel with the initial public showing of the film having occurred Feb. 16, 2013, at the Needham Town Hall. In 2015, Nathan Gorenstein (related to the Millens) published the most exhaustive accounting to date of the crime, entitled Tommy Gun Winter.

Haddock has a memorial inscription (panel 62, W-10) as part of the National Law Enforcement Officers Memorial in Washington, DC.

Haddock’s grandson Michael Murphy serves as a Police Sergeant in Addison, Texas. Haddock's granddaughter, Monica Pratt, is a magazine editor and writer in Redlands, California. Another grandson is political scientist and opinion columnist Jeffrey Sadow.

With Haddock’s death, this ended a streak of three generations of Haddocks with the first or middle name of "Oliver" who died prematurely; his father died of pneumonia, and his grandfather Oliver James Haddock (November 2, 1837 – July 2, 1871), discharged from the Army for wounds suffered during the Civil War, died of consumption.

== See also ==
- History of Dedham, Massachusetts, 1900–1999#Millen/Faber trial
