= Hunger marches =

Form of social protest

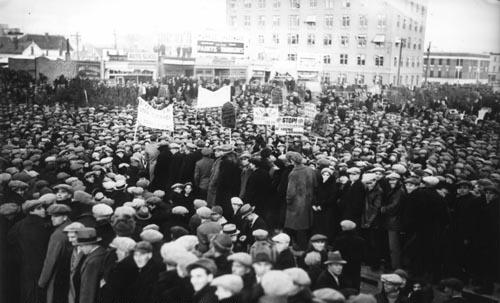
This photo was taken of a Canadian hunger march forming up in 1932 in Alberta. A short time later, as it set off to the legislature a few blocks away, it was dispersed by billy-club-wielding constables on foot and horseback.

Hunger marches are a form of social protest that arose in the United Kingdom during the early 20th century. Often the marches involved groups of men and women walking from areas with high unemployment to London where they would protest outside parliament. Sometimes they would march instead to the offices of regional authorities in cities closer to home. Protesters would try to make the point that lack of work meant they were unable to buy sufficient food to avoid hunger for themselves and their families. The first such march took place in 1905. The term "hunger march" was coined three years later in 1908. In the first two decades of the 20th century, there was relatively little unemployment in the UK, but it could still become a severe problem in various areas after disruptive changes to the local economy. Hunger marches became much more prominent in the 1920s and 1930s during the Great Depression in the United Kingdom.

During the widespread Great Depression of the 1930s, hunger marches also occurred in Canada and other countries.

Many of the UK hunger marches were supported by the British wing of the Communist party. While communism was at this time far more respectable than it was to become during the Cold War, authorities often regarded the Communist-organized hunger marches with hostility. The marches were often brutally oppressed, and by the late 20th century had been mostly forgotten. An exception is the Jarrow crusade. This march had fewer than five hundred participants, with religious rather than political overtones. It did not provoke a hostile response from the authorities and was therefore not tinged with violence. Michael Portillo has said this caused the Jarrow march to be well-regarded and remembered, in contrast to other marches that often had many more thousands of participants and had had a greater impact.

In the decades that followed World War II, there was much less unemployment in the UK and throughout the industrialized world, due in part to the Keynesian Revolution. Even those without work or savings found it easier to feed themselves, due to the establishment of the welfare state. As a result, hunger marches were no longer needed. There were incidents where thousands of people embarked on marches to draw attention to hunger in the developing world, as happened for example during the 1973 Ethiopian famine, but the term "hunger march" was not often used to describe these events.

== List of UK hunger marches ==
- 1922
- November 8, 1927. 2500 people marched to London.
- 1930
- September 5, 1931. 112 people, including 12 women, took part in a hunger march to the TUC offices in Bristol, under the slogan "Struggle or Starve". A third of the marchers were from Rhondda. The TUC refused to listen to the deputation and the march was broken up in Bristol by mounted police.
- The 1932 Hunger March, which started in Scotland, gained 100,000 marchers and ended in a riot in Hyde Park, London.
- 1934
- 1936 - there was a hunger march with thousands of participants, a separate event to the better-remembered but smaller 1936 Jarrow crusade.

== See also ==
- Hunger in the United Kingdom
