= Verne Sankey and Gordon Alcorn =

Verne Sankey
- Born: 1890
- Died: February 8, 1934 (aged 44); Sioux Falls, South Dakota, US
- Occupations: Bank robber, kidnapper

Verne Sankey (1890 – February 8, 1934) and Gordon Alcorn were a pair of American outlaws of the Depression-era whose successful kidnappings of Haskell Bohn and Charles Boettcher II in 1932 made them two of the most wanted criminals in the United States, and inspired a number of other kidnappings across the country. Their eventual capture was a result of one of these copycat kidnappings, of which they themselves were wrongly accused. Sankey was initially a suspect in the Lindbergh baby kidnapping, but was cleared after an investigation by the FBI.

== Biography ==
Born in 1890, Verne Sankey worked on the Canadian Pacific Railway in his youth and later attempted to start a farm in South Dakota. When the farm failed, he and Gordon Alcorn began robbing banks in Canada and the United States. The two men eventually decided to try kidnapping and, in June 1932, they abducted Haskell Bohn in St. Paul, Minnesota. Bohn was the son of a local refrigerator magnate and they demanded $35,000 for his release, but instead settled for $12,000. Seven months later, they kidnapped Denver millionaire Charles Boettcher II and held them at Sankey's turkey ranch in South Dakota until they were paid $60,000.

In a matter of months, Sankey and Alcorn were considered two of the most sought-after outlaws in the country. Their successful kidnappings were imitated by many in the Midwest underworld, such as the 1933 kidnapping of Charles Urschel by Albert Bates and George "Machine Gun" Kelly. Ironically, it was the high-profile kidnappings of William Hamm Jr. and Edward Bremer by the Barker Gang that led to their downfall. As the authorities were not yet aware of the existence of the Barkers, the kidnappings were blamed on Sankey and Alcorn, who were quickly tracked down by the FBI.

On January 31, 1934, Sankey was captured by police and federal agents at a barber shop in Chicago, Illinois. He was returned to South Dakota to stand trial for the Boettcher kidnaping, being held at the state prison in Sioux Falls for added security; however, Sankey committed suicide before his trial by hanging himself in his cell with his necktie on February 8. Alcorn had been captured a week earlier and was sentenced to life imprisonment for Boettcher's kidnapping.
