= May 1934 =

Month of 1934

| << | May 1934 | | | | | >> |
| Su | Mo | Tu | We | Th | Fr | Sa |
| | | 1 | 2 | 3 | 4 | 5 |
| 6 | 7 | 8 | 9 | 10 | 11 | 12 |
| 13 | 14 | 15 | 16 | 17 | 18 | 19 |
| 20 | 21 | 22 | 23 | 24 | 25 | 26 |
| 27 | 28 | 29 | 30 | 31 |

The following events occurred in May 1934:

== May 1, 1934 (Tuesday) ==
- The "May Constitution" was proclaimed in Austria, making the country a one-party Austrofascist state.
- Ernst Rüdiger Starhemberg became Vice-Chancellor of Austria, replacing his bitter rival Emil Fey.
- Adolf Hitler gave a May Day speech to a rally at Tempelhof Air Field in Berlin, telling Germany that his government would make every effort to reduce unemployment. "The German people are inspired", Hitler said, "from their venerable president down to the worker and peasant, with only one wish – to become happy through work."
- The Concordat of 1933, regulating church-state relations in Austria, came into effect.

== May 2, 1934 (Wednesday) ==
- Nazi Germany created a new high court, the People's Court (Volksgerichtshof), empowered to mete out death sentences for high treason.

== May 3, 1934 (Thursday) ==
- Nazis seized all property of the Catholic Youth and Young Men's associations in Lower Franconia, Bavaria. The associations themselves were ordered to dissolve and the protection granted them in the concordat was declared canceled.
- Saudi forces captured Al Hudaydah in the Saudi–Yemeni War.
- Born: Henry Cooper, boxer, in Oxted, Surrey, England (d. 2011); Frankie Valli, singer, in Newark, New Jersey
- Died: William H. Woodin, 65, American industrialist and Secretary of the Treasury

== May 4, 1934 (Friday) ==
- 50,000 acres of land seized by the Spanish government in 1932 were returned to their owners.
- 200,000 acres of timber in the Blue Ridge Mountains of North Carolina were destroyed by forest fires.
- The crime melodrama film Manhattan Melodrama starring Clark Gable, William Powell and Myrna Loy was released.
- Born: Tatiana Samoilova, actress, in Leningrad, USSR (d. 2014); Sammy Steamboat, professional wrestler, in Hawaii (d. 2006)

== May 5, 1934 (Saturday) ==
- Cavalcade won the Kentucky Derby horse race.
- Hunslet defeated Widnes 11–5 in the Challenge Cup Final of rugby at Wembley Stadium.
- The first Three Stooges short film, Woman Haters, was released.

== May 6, 1934 (Sunday) ==
- 100,000 demonstrated in Zweibrücken for the restoration of the Saar to Germany. "The Saar is German and will remain German", Joseph Goebbels told the crowd. "We will never rest until the despotic barriers are torn down, and we can welcome you as our blood brothers in the union of the Reich."
- Madrid FC defeated Valencia FC 2–1 in the Copa del Presidente de la República Final.
- FC Sète defeated Olympique de Marseille 2–1 in the Coupe de France Final.
- Born: Richard Shelby, politician, in Birmingham, Alabama

== May 7, 1934 (Monday) ==
- 87 were killed in a fire that swept through a potash mine in Müllheim, Germany.
- Fugitive businessman Samuel Insull arrived on American soil in the custody of authorities.

== May 8, 1934 (Tuesday) ==
- Nazi Germany eased some restrictions on freedom of the press due to a heavy slump in sales of newspapers ever since they had all been forced to publish the same official reports of important public events.
- Actress Katharine Hepburn received a divorce in Mexico from her husband, Ludlow Ogden Smith.

== May 9, 1934 (Wednesday) ==
- Benito Mussolini's central guild committee approved a plan to unify Italy's economic production under corporatism.
- The most significant dust storm of the Dust Bowl to this point began on the High Plains of the United States and reached Milwaukee and Chicago by mid-afternoon.
- Retired oil millionaire William Gettle was kidnapped from his home in Arcadia, California and held for ransom.
- The West Coast waterfront strike began in the United States.
- The romantic drama film Sadie McKee starring Joan Crawford was released.
- Born: Alan Bennett, playwright, actor and writer, in Armley, Leeds, England
- Died: Joy Morton, 78, American businessman

== May 10, 1934 (Thursday) ==
- Joachim von Ribbentrop had a conference at London's foreign office with Sir John Simon and Anthony Eden, but was unable to extract any promises from Britain on the issue of German rearmament.
- The Cunard-White Star Line was created after the Cunard Line and the White Star Line merged into one company.
- The Battle of Cañada Strongest began in the Chaco War.
- The Revenue Act of 1934 was enacted in the United States.
- Born: Gary Owens, disc jockey and voice actor, in Mitchell, South Dakota (d. 2015)

== May 11, 1934 (Friday) ==
- The German secret police broke up a meeting of 1,000 anti-Nazi delegates to the Protestant synod of Brandenburg.
- Joseph Goebbels opened a campaign against "defeatists and critics" of the Nazi government. During his announcement he issued a "last warning" to the nation's Jews, saying they would have to "behave as guests."

== May 12, 1934 (Saturday) ==
- Fist fights broke out at the University of Madrid between socialists and fascists shortly after a 48-hour general strike by students went into effect. Riot police moved in to break up the clashes.
- Australian Eastern Mission: Japanese foreign minister Kōki Hirota hosted Australian deputy prime minister John Latham in Tokyo, in a meeting considered "one of the most important in Australian diplomatic history". Hirota affirmed Japan would only return to the League of Nations following de jure international recognition of the puppet state of Manchoukuo.

== May 13, 1934 (Sunday) ==
- An armistice was signed in the Saudi–Yemeni War.
- High Quest nosed out Cavalcade in the Preakness Stakes horse race.
- The Museum Koenig opened in Bonn, Germany.
- Born: Killer Karl Krupp, professional wrestler, in the Netherlands (d. 1995); Leon Wagner, baseball player, in Chattanooga, Tennessee (d. 2004)

== May 14, 1934 (Monday) ==
- June Robles was found alive in a cave about 10 miles (16 km) from her Tucson, Arizona home.
- William Gettle was rescued by police in a raid on a home in La Crescenda, California. Six suspects in the kidnapping were arrested.
- Died: Norman Clapham (a.k.a. John Henry), 54, British comedian, suicide by coal gas poisoning; Tom Pickett, 75 or 76, American cowboy, gambler, lawman and outlaw

== May 15, 1934 (Tuesday) ==
- Kārlis Ulmanis established an authoritarian regime in Latvia through a military-assisted coup.
- Leon Kozłowski became Prime Minister of Poland.
- Born: George Roper, comedian, in Liverpool, England (d. 2003)

== May 16, 1934 (Wednesday) ==
- A general strike of Teamsters began in Minneapolis.

== May 17, 1934 (Thursday) ==
- The American pro-Nazi organization Friends of New Germany drew 20,000 supporters to a rally at Madison Square Garden in New York City.
- Died: Cass Gilbert, 75, American architect

== May 18, 1934 (Friday) ==
- U.S. President Franklin D. Roosevelt delivered a special message to Congress calling for regulation of arms traffic. "The people of many countries are being taxed to the point of poverty and starvation in order to enable governments to engage in a mad race in armament which, if permitted to continue, may well result in war", Roosevelt declared. "This grave menace to the peace of the world is due in no small measure to the uncontrolled activities of the manufacturers and merchants of engines of destruction, and it must be met by the concerted action of the peoples of all nations."
- The horror film The Black Cat starring Boris Karloff and Bela Lugosi was released.
- Born: Dwayne Hickman, actor and television executive, in Los Angeles (d. 2022)

== May 19, 1934 (Saturday) ==
- 19 May coup d'état: Officers of the Bulgarian Army overthrew the government and established a dictatorship. General Kimon Georgiev was installed as the new Prime Minister.
- Born: Jim Lehrer, journalist, news anchor and author, in Wichita, Kansas (d. 2020)

== May 20, 1934 (Sunday) ==
- Conrad of Parzham was canonized as a saint by Pope Pius XI. During the ceremony in the presence of 5,000 German pilgrims, the pope condemned the revival of paganism in Germany when he said, "The life of Conrad of Parzham is an admonition to all those who have wandered far from the truth and seek to restore and magnify with phrases the practices and customs of paganism, and who repudiate Christian doctrine which alone can recall them to virtue, civilization and the true processes."

== May 21, 1934 (Monday) ==
- Austria released 80 socialists imprisoned since February's civil war on parole, including former chancellor Karl Renner.
- Born: Bengt I. Samuelsson, biochemist and Nobel laureate, in Halmstad, Sweden (d. 2024)

== May 22, 1934 (Tuesday) ==
- The Panchen Lama visited Shanghai after ten years of exile enforced by the late 13th Dalai Lama, spent mostly in Mongolia.
- Born: Peter Nero, pianist and conductor, in Brooklyn, New York (d. 2023)

== May 23, 1934 (Wednesday) ==
- American outlaws Bonnie and Clyde were ambushed and killed by law officers on a rural road in Bienville Parish, Louisiana.
- "Battle of Toledo": The Auto-Lite strike in Toledo, Ohio turned violent as workers clashed with police.
- El Salvador became the first country to recognize Manchukuo formally apart from Japan.
- The comedy-mystery film The Thin Man was released.
- Born: Robert Moog, inventor of the Moog synthesizer, in New York City (d. 2005)
- Died: Bonnie and Clyde, 23 and 25, American outlaws (shot by law officers)

== May 24, 1934 (Thursday) ==
- Rioting in Toledo entered its second day as 6,000 workers fought with the National Guard in front of the Auto-Lite plant.
- Born: Barry Rose, choir trainer and organist, in Chingford, England
- Died: Brand Whitlock, 65, American journalist and politician

== May 25, 1934 (Friday) ==
- The Irish Dáil Éireann passed a bill abolishing the Senate.
- The Battle of Cañada Strongest ended in Bolivian victory.
- Died: Gustav Holst, 59, English composer

== May 26, 1934 (Saturday) ==
- The Century of Progress International Exposition re-opened in Chicago for an additional five months.
- Soft serve was invented by accident when a Carvel truck in Hartsdale, New York pulled over with a flat tire but managed to sell the melting ice cream to customers.

== May 27, 1934 (Sunday) ==
- The second FIFA World Cup football tournament opened in Italy.
- Unknown assailants made an attempt on the life of the American ambassador to Cuba, Jefferson Caffery, firing at the entrance to his home in Havana with sawed-off shotguns at the precise time that he usually came out. Caffery was not injured but a soldier standing guard was seriously wounded.
- Born: Harlan Ellison, writer, in Cleveland, Ohio (d. 2018)

== May 28, 1934 (Monday) ==
- Racer Kaye Don was involved in an accident during a practice run on the Isle of Man that killed his mechanic. Don would be put on trial for manslaughter.
- The world-famous Dionne quintuplets were born on a farm in Canada near Corbeil, Ontario.

== May 29, 1934 (Tuesday) ==
- Representatives of the United States and Cuba signed a treaty in Washington abrogating the Platt Amendment.
- Born: Nanette Newman, actress and author, in Northampton, England

== May 30, 1934 (Wednesday) ==
- Bill Cummings won the Indianapolis 500 auto race.
- Born: Alexei Leonov, cosmonaut, in Listvyanka, USSR (d. 2019)
- Died: Tōgō Heihachirō, 86, Japanese admiral

== May 31, 1934 (Thursday) ==
- The Barmen Declaration, largely drafted by Karl Barth, was signed by Christians in Nazi Germany who were opposed to the pro-Nazi German Christian movement.
- U.S. Congress ratified the treaty with Cuba abrogating the Platt Amendment.
- Died: Lew Cody, 50, American actor (heart attack)
