= April 1934 =

Month in 1934

<<	April 1934					>>
Su	Mo	Tu	We	Th	Fr	Sa
1	2	3	4	5	6	7
8	9	10	11	12	13	14
15	16	17	18	19	20	21
22	23	24	25	26	27	28
29	30

The following events occurred in April 1934:

== April 1, 1934 (Sunday) ==
- Turkish authorities removed fugitive businessman Samuel Insull from his ship docked at Istanbul, brought him to court for a 15-minute hearing and then confined him to a hotel under guard.
- John Bosco was canonized as a saint by Pope Pius XI.
- The Major Bowes Amateur Hour premiered on the New York radio station WHN.
- Two Texas Highway Patrol officers are killed by Clyde Barrow and Henry Methvin of the Barrow Gang in Grapevine, Texas.
- Born: Jim Ed Brown, country singer, in Sparkman, Arkansas (d. 2015); Don Hastings, actor, singer and writer, in Brooklyn, New York; Rod Kanehl, baseball player, in Wichita, Kansas (d. 2004); Vladimir Posner, journalist, in Paris, France
- Died: Barney Gilligan, 78, American baseball player

== April 2, 1934 (Monday) ==
- The Turkish government put Samuel Insull in jail to ensure his presence when American agents arrived to extradite him.
- Catholic holy year ended when Pope Pius XI walled up the holy door of St. Peter's Basilica, not to be opened again until the next holy year in 1950.
- A message from Pope Pius XI published in a Cologne-based Catholic publication criticized Nazi propaganda as "pointing away from Christ back to paganism."
- Guy Moll won the Monaco Grand Prix.
- Born: Paul Avery, journalist, in Honolulu, Hawaii (d. 2000); Paul Cohen, mathematician, in Long Branch, New Jersey (d. 2007); Brian Glover, actor, writer and wrestler, in Sheffield, England (d. 1997)

== April 3, 1934 (Tuesday) ==
- A court in Duisburg, Germany ruled that "the Catholic press has no right to exist." The ruling was made in connection with an unfair competition lawsuit brought by a company that published several small Catholic newspapers against a rival Nazi paper that was accused of securing subscriptions through intimidation.
- Born: Jane Goodall, primatologist, in London, England

== April 4, 1934 (Wednesday) ==
- The Soviet–Polish Non-Aggression Pact of 1932 was renewed for another ten years.
- Died: John Francis Dillon, 49, American film director and actor

== April 5, 1934 (Thursday) ==
- Romanian court sentenced three members of the Iron Guard movement to life imprisonment for the murder of Prime Minister Ion G. Duca. However, 46 others were acquitted in a blow to the government.
- Joan Meakin became the first female glider pilot to fly over the English Channel.
- The comedy film You're Telling Me! starring W. C. Fields was released.
- Born:
  - Enrique Álvarez Félix, actor, in Guadalajara, Mexico (d. 1996)
  - Roman Herzog, President of Germany, in Landshut, Germany (d. 2017)
- Died: Jiro Sato, 26, Japanese tennis player (suicide)

== April 6, 1934 (Friday) ==
- 6,000 unemployed people rioted in Minneapolis. A parade of the jobless seeking an extension of the Civil Works Administration marched to City Hall and sent in a committee to see the city council, but after word got out that the committee had been arrested the demonstration turned violent. Police moved in with tear gas and clubs and a total of 18 were injured, 13 of them law enforcement.
- The drama film Men in White starring Clark Gable and Myrna Loy was released.
- Born: Anton Geesink, judo champion, in Utrecht, Netherlands (d. 2010)

== April 7, 1934 (Saturday) ==
- A huge landslip fell into a fjord in western Norway and caused a local tsunami that killed 40 residents of the village of Tafjord.
- Died: Karl von Einem, 81, German army commander

== April 8, 1934 (Sunday) ==
- Communists engaged in street fighting with members of the far-right Solidarité Française in the Place de l'Étoile district of Paris. Over 1,000 communists also battled police in the frontier town of Thionville.
- Born: Turk Farrell, baseball player, in Boston, Massachusetts (d. 1977)
- Died: Franklin Clarence Mars, 50, American business magnate

== April 9, 1934 (Monday) ==
- Pope Pius XI received 80 foreign correspondents at the Vatican, the first time the press had ever been invited to meet a pope. The pope said the occasion was to thank the press because "this holy year has been magnificent and successful, and a great part of the resonance it has had throughout the world was due to you and what you wrote about it."
- Anne Frank joins the 6th Montessori School after emigrating to Amsterdam from Frankfert.
- Born: Bill Birch, politician, in Hastings, New Zealand

== April 10, 1934 (Tuesday) ==
- Spanish Falangist leader José Antonio Primo de Rivera survived an assassination attempt in Madrid. Four men threw bombs at his car and then fired bullets at it, but Primo de Rivera was unharmed.
- The Chicago Black Hawks beat the Detroit Red Wings 1–0 in double overtime to win the Stanley Cup Finals, three games to one. It was the first Stanley Cup in the franchise's history.
- The film Viva Villa! starring Wallace Beery was released.
- The Jean Cocteau play The Infernal Machine premiered in Paris.

== April 11, 1934 (Wednesday) ==
- Adolf Hitler made a secret deal with the leaders of the German armed forces aboard the cruiser Deutschland, promising to eliminate Ernst Röhm and subordinate the Sturmabteilung to the army in exchange for their support. This agreement led to the purge known as the Night of the Long Knives.
- Italian aviator Renato Donati set a new flight altitude record of 14,433 meters (47,354 feet).
- Born: Mark Strand, poet and essayist, in Summerside, Prince Edward Island, Canada (d. 2014)
- Died: Gerald du Maurier, 61, English actor and manager

== April 12, 1934 (Thursday) ==
- Soviet flyers recovered the last six of the 103 marooned survivors of the SS Chelyuskin, which sank near Kolyuchin Island in the Chukchi Sea in February.
- Costa Rica, El Salvador, Guatemala, Honduras and Nicaragua signed a friendship treaty in Guatemala City.
- The Auto-Lite strike began in Toledo, Ohio.
- A book by U.S. President Franklin D. Roosevelt was published titled On Our Way, defending the New Deal and reviewing the accomplishments of its first year.

== April 13, 1934 (Friday) ==
- Turkey handed Samuel Insull over to American authorities aboard a ship at Smyrna.

== April 14, 1934 (Saturday) ==
- The far-right National Radical Camp Falanga was founded in Poland.
- Actress Norma Talmadge obtained a divorce in Mexico from film executive Joseph M. Schenck.

== April 15, 1934 (Sunday) ==
- The King and Queen of Italy inaugurated Sabaudia, the second city to be built on the newly drained Pontine Marshes. Littoria, founded in 1932, was the first.
- A police raid on a secluded villa in Barbizon, France revealed that Leon Trotsky had been secretly living there for the past few months and not in Corsica as the local authorities believed. Trotsky said he had been living there in secrecy because he feared attempts on his life and produced his authority to live there. The villa attracted suspicion because of the large volume of mail it had been receiving.
- Died: Karl Dane, 47, Danish-American comedian and actor (suicide)

== April 16, 1934 (Monday) ==
- The title Hero of the Soviet Union was established.

== April 17, 1934 (Tuesday) ==
- On Budget Day in the United Kingdom, Chancellor of the Exchequer Neville Chamberlain presented a "prosperity budget" that rolled back many previous tax increases and service cuts while still projecting a surplus of £800,000.
- The newly refurbished Fenway Park opened in Boston, Massachusetts. Seating capacity was increased and the mound known as Duffy's Cliff along the left-field wall had been leveled, a scoreboard installed at the base of the wall in its place. The entire park gained its distinctive shade of green at this time, although the left-field wall later to be famously nicknamed the Green Monster would remain covered in advertisements until 1947.

== April 18, 1934 (Wednesday) ==
- France ordered Leon Trotsky out of the country, accusing him of plotting to overthrow the government.
- The first laundromat opened in Fort Worth, Texas, called a "Wash-a-Teria".
- Born: James Drury, actor, in New York City (d. 2020)

== April 19, 1934 (Thursday) ==
- In Austria, 81 political opponents of the Dollfuss government were sent to Wöllersdorf concentration camp without trial.
- 95.75% of Voters in Uruguay approved a new constitution in a national referendum.
- Dave Komonen won the Boston Marathon.
- The musical film Stand Up and Cheer! starring Warner Baxter, Madge Evans and Shirley Temple in the role that made her famous, premiered at Radio City Music Hall in New York City.
- Died: Charlie Hickman, 57, American baseball player

== April 20, 1934 (Friday) ==
- Hermann Göring transferred administration of the Gestapo to Heinrich Himmler.
- The action-adventure film Tarzan and His Mate, the second in the Tarzan film series starring Johnny Weissmuller, premiered at the Capitol Theatre in New York City.

== April 21, 1934 (Saturday) ==
- A mine explosion at Kakanj near Sarajevo killed 150 miners and trapped an additional 250 underground.
- "Surgeon's Photograph" purporting to show the Loch Ness Monster was published in the Daily Mail. The picture is now known to have been a hoax.

== April 22, 1934 (Sunday) ==
- The FBI caught up with John Dillinger and his men in Manitowish, Wisconsin, but the gang escaped unscathed. An FBI agent was killed in the shootout and an innocent man also died in the crossfire.
- King Victor Emmanuel III of Italy rode the first train in the Apennine Base Tunnel, a new 12-mile direct railway line running through the Apennine Mountains connecting Florence and Bologna. It was the world's longest double track tunnel at the time of construction and took 3,000 men ten years to build.
- Died: Alice Claypoole Gwynne, 88, dowager Mrs. Vanderbilt

== April 23, 1934 (Monday) ==
- Dillinger and his associates Homer Van Meter and John Hamilton engaged in another shootout with law enforcement near Hastings, Minnesota. Hamilton was wounded in the back and would die a few days later.
- Berlin police prohibited fortune-telling.

== April 24, 1934 (Tuesday) ==
- U.S. Patent #1956350 was filed by Laurens Hammond for an "electrical musical instrument" known today as the Hammond organ.
- Born: Jayakanthan, writer, in Cuddalore, British India (d. 2015); Shirley MacLaine, entertainer, activist and author, in Richmond, Virginia

== April 25, 1934 (Wednesday) ==
- Spanish Prime Minister Alejandro Lerroux and his cabinet were forced to resign by President Niceto Alcalá-Zamora due to disagreement between the two over an amnesty law.
- Tucson, Arizona child June Robles was kidnapped by an unidentified man in a case that drew national headlines.
- Born: Peter McParland, footballer, in Newry, Northern Ireland (d. 2025); Denny Miller, actor, in Bloomington, Indiana (d. 2014)

== April 26, 1934 (Thursday) ==
- American railroad owners and workers averted a strike by reaching a settlement to gradually roll back the 10 percent pay cut imposed on the workers two years earlier.
- Died: John Hamilton, 34 or 35, Canadian criminal (died of gunshot wounds; some sources give date of death as April 27 or 30)

== April 27, 1934 (Friday) ==
- German foreign minister Konstantin von Neurath gave a press conference denouncing France for "destroying at a single blow the result of lengthy negotiations for disarmament", calling it amazing that France would spend 16 billion francs on its military and express alarm at Germany's defense expenditure of 890 million reichsmarks.
- Died: Joe Vila, 67, American sportswriter and editor

== April 28, 1934 (Saturday) ==
- Manchester City defeated Portsmouth 2–1 in the FA Cup Final at Wembley Stadium.
- King Victor Emmanuel III inaugurated Italy's 29th legislature with a speech from the throne that included a lengthy statement on the necessity of increasing Italy's armed forces.

== April 29, 1934 (Sunday) ==
- Nazis confiscated three Catholic newspapers around Germany for printing articles informing readers about the church's ongoing dispute with the government.
- Born: Luis Aparicio, baseball player, in Maracaibo, Venezuela; Pedro Pires, 3rd President of Cape Verde, in Fogo, Cape Verde; Akira Takarada, actor, in Korea (d. 2022)

== April 30, 1934 (Monday) ==
- The remnants of the Austrian parliament, down to 74 members because the 73 members of the Social Democratic Party were all either imprisoned or in hiding, held their first session in over a year. By a vote of 72-2 the parliament approved a new constitution turning the country into a dictatorship.
- The independent American film Hitler's Reign of Terror, an anti-Nazi film composed of newsreel footage and re-enactments, premiered at the Mayfair in New York City.
- Eleanor Roosevelt, the First Lady of the United States, hosted the White House Conference on Camps for Unemployed Women.
- Born: Don McKenney, ice hockey player, in Smiths Falls, Ontario, Canada (d. 2022)
