= August 1934 =

Month of 1934

<<	August 1934					>>
Su	Mo	Tu	We	Th	Fr	Sa
			1	2	3	4
5	6	7	8	9	10	11
12	13	14	15	16	17	18
19	20	21	22	23	24	25
26	27	28	29	30	31

The following events occurred in August 1934:

== August 1, 1934 (Wednesday) ==
- With Paul von Hindenburg on his death bed, the German government passed the Law Concerning the Head of State of the German Reich, which abolished the title of President and merged its powers with those of Chancellor. Hitler was now to be known as Führer and Reich Chancellor. Passage of the law was not announced until noon the following day.
- Pope Pius XI traveled by automobile to the Papal Palace of Castel Gandolfo in the Alban Hills, a papal vacation retreat that no pope had visited since 1869. No popes left the Vatican between 1870 and the signing of the Lateran Treaty in 1929, and in the five years since then Pius XI had not left the immediate vicinity of Rome.

== August 2, 1934 (Thursday) ==
- Paul von Hindenburg died at nine o'clock in the morning at his estate in Neudeck.
- The German government announced that a referendum would be held on August 19 for voters to approve the Law on the Head of State of the German Reich.
- Born: Valery Bykovsky, cosmonaut, in Pavlovsky Posad, USSR (d. 2019)
- Died: Paul von Hindenburg, 86, Prussian-German field marshal and statesman; George H. Mallon, 57, U.S. Army officer and Medal of Honor recipient; Lucille Young, 52, American film actress

== August 3, 1934 (Friday) ==
- After a month spent mostly at sea, U.S. President Franklin D. Roosevelt arrived in Portland, Oregon, and visited the Bonneville Dam.
- Born: Jonas Savimbi, political and military leader, in Munhango, Angola (d. 2002)

== August 4, 1934 (Saturday) ==
- During a 21–4 win over the Philadelphia Phillies, Mel Ott of the New York Giants scored six runs in one game, something that no player had done since 1899. Ott would score six runs in a game again on April 30, 1944, and become the only player to ever accomplish the feat twice.
- Born: Dallas Green, baseball player and manager, in Newport, Delaware (d. 2017)

== August 5, 1934 (Sunday) ==
- Adolf Hitler said in a Daily Mail interview that "If it rests with Germany, war will not come again. This country has a more profound impression than any other of the evil that war causes. Ninety-five percent of the members of the National Administration have had personal experiences of its horrors. They know that it is not a romantic adventure but a ghastly catastrophe."
- Born: Wendell Berry, writer, in Henry County, Kentucky; Gay Byrne, radio and television presenter, in Dublin, Ireland (d. 2019)

== August 6, 1934 (Monday) ==
- The body of Paul von Hindenburg was brought to the Tannenberg Memorial. The road for the funeral procession was lined with mourners bearing torches.
- Born: Billy Boston, rugby league footballer, in Tiger Bay, Cardiff, Wales

== August 7, 1934 (Tuesday) ==
- The funeral service for Paul von Hindenburg was held. Hitler delivered the final oration.
- Franz von Papen stepped down as Vice-Chancellor of Germany. The position was left vacant.

== August 8, 1934 (Wednesday) ==
- 50,000 gathered in Vienna for a memorial ceremony for Engelbert Dollfuss, organized by the Fatherland Front. Chancellor Schuschnigg and Vice-Chancellor Starhemberg both spoke at the event, proclaiming their determination to keep Austria independent.
- 12 drowned in Poland when a motorbus slid off a road into the Bug River. The bus driver and three passengers escaped.
- Died: Wilbert Robinson, 71, American baseball player and manager

== August 9, 1934 (Thursday) ==
- The Bluebell Collision occurred in Newcastle, Australia, when the harbour ferry Bluebell struck a coastal freighter and sank.
- Adolf Hitler proclaimed a general amnesty for thousands of political prisoners, mostly affecting those incarcerated for lower-level crimes such as criticizing the government. The amnesty did not apply to those serving sentences for high treason, espionage or attempted murder. Hitler also ordered the dissolution of the Austrian Legion, the organization of Austrian Nazis who had crossed the border after Dollfuss had banned the Nazi Party there.
- The German Evangelical National Synod under Reichbischof Ludwig Müller passed a resolution requiring pastors and church officials to swear an oath to be "faithful and obedient to the Führer of the German people, Adolf Hitler."
- The 4th Women's World Games opened in London.
- Some 10,000 banana workers went on strike in Costa Rica. The strike, led by Carlos Luis Fallas and other Communist Party organizers, was the largest strike in Costa Rican history at the time.

== August 10, 1934 (Friday) ==
- General Werner von Blomberg issued a decree ordering all German soldiers to refer to Hitler as "Mein Führer" instead of "Der Führer".
- Babe Ruth of the New York Yankees announced that the present season would be his last as a full-time player. "I really don't know what the future holds for me – only time will tell", Ruth said. "I would like to remain in the game as a manager and perhaps do a little pinch hitting on Saturdays and Sundays or days when I figured it would help the gate."
- Twenty-three-year-old American music student Isobel Lillian Steele was arrested in Berlin on suspicion of espionage. During her four months of captivity her case became a cause célèbre in the American media as the U.S. government worked to free her.
- Born: James Tenney, composer and musical theorist, in Silver City, New Mexico (d. 2006)
- Died: George W. Hill, 39, American film director and cinematographer

== August 11, 1934 (Saturday) ==
- The Women's World Games ended.
- William Beebe and Otis Barton broke their own deep-sea diving record, attaining a depth of 2,510 feet (770 m) in a bathysphere 8 miles (13 km) off Bermuda. Beebe reported seeing strange deep sea fish equipped with "headlights" that gave him an impression that "stars in a black sky twisting around crazily, had suddenly gone mad."

== August 12, 1934 (Sunday) ==
- Babe Ruth visited Fenway Park for the last time as the Yankees split a doubleheader against the Boston Red Sox. A then-Fenway record of 46,776 fans came out to cheer for the Babe in the ballpark where his major league career began in 1914. Ruth went 2-for-5 with a double in the first game and 0-for-1 with two walks in the second game.

== August 13, 1934 (Monday) ==
- The Copley Street riot in Cork, Ireland arising out of a conflict between farmers and the state during the Anglo-Irish trade war.
- The comic strip Li'l Abner first appeared.
- Four Austrian policemen were hanged for participating in the July Putsch.
- Died: Mary Hunter Austin, 65, American writer

== August 14, 1934 (Tuesday) ==
- John S. Labatt, president of Canada's Labatt Brewing Company, was kidnapped while driving between his summer home in Sarnia and his office in London, Ontario. The kidnappers left a note demanding $150,000.
- Hitler received a signed document containing Hindenburg's 'last wish', which was for the restoration of the Hohenzollern monarchy. Hitler did not have the document published.
- The New York City Police Department Combat Cross was established.
- Hermann Göring was injured in an accident outside Munich when the car he was driving collided with a truck on a narrow road. He sustained injuries to his back and cuts to his face and knees, but left the hospital the next day.
- Died: Raymond Hood, 53, American architect

== August 15, 1934 (Wednesday) ==
- Hindenburg's 'testament' was published in the German press, speaking highly of "my Chancellor Adolf Hitler and his movement".
- The United States occupation of Haiti ended after 19 years, in accordance with President Roosevelt's Good Neighbor policy towards Latin America, as the last contingent of American troops departed.
- William Beebe and Otis Barton broke their own deep-sea diving record again, achieving a depth of 3,028 feet (923 m). Beebe attempted to take some motion picture film of the deep sea fish he first saw on Saturday, but the fish kept swimming away from the bathysphere's searchlight and the film proved inconclusive.
- Born: Nino Ferrer, singer, in Genoa, Italy (d. 1998)

== August 16, 1934 (Thursday) ==
- Italy ordered the 48,000 troops rushed to the Austro-Italian border during the July Putsch to return to their regular bases.
- Hitler's amnesty announcement went into effect, releasing the prisoners in time to vote in Sunday's referendum.
- The Cecil B. DeMille-directed epic film Cleopatra starring Claudette Colbert was released.
- Born: Donnie Dunagan, actor, in San Antonio, Texas; Ed van Thijn, politician, in Amsterdam, Netherlands (d. 2021); Diana Wynne Jones, fantasy novelist, in London, England (d. 2011)

== August 17, 1934 (Friday) ==
- In Hamburg, Hitler made his lone campaign speech before the referendum, explaining that he arranged for the abolition of the presidency in order to prevent any attempts by foreign elements to stir up intrigues over the question of succession. Hitler also attacked the system of government under the old Weimar Republic as not being capable of action but "only of compromise."
- John Labatt was released by his kidnappers at Forest Hill, Toronto when they panicked over the ransom money not arriving fast enough while the police were closing in. Labatt promised his kidnappers he would deliver $25,000 to a place of their choosing in exchange for his release, but they did not try to contact him again and he never paid.
- The adventure film Treasure Island starring Wallace Beery and Jackie Cooper was released.
- The National Beta Club was founded in USA.

== August 18, 1934 (Saturday) ==
- Manchukuo severed all relations with the Soviet Union due to a variety of border incidents including soldiers firing on each other. The two states did not have formal diplomatic relations but had been communicating unofficially due to shared borders and commercial interests.
- Born: Vincent Bugliosi, attorney and author, in Hibbing, Minnesota (d. 2015); Roberto Clemente, baseball player, in San Juan, Puerto Rico (d. 1972)

== August 19, 1934 (Sunday) ==
- The referendum on merging the posts of Chancellor and President was held in Nazi Germany. The referendum passed with almost 90% approval.
- Born: Renée Richards, transsexual physician and tennis player, in New York City
- Died: Henry Thomas Rainey, 73, American politician

== August 20, 1934 (Monday) ==
- A new law was decreed in Nazi Germany replacing the Reichswehreid with the Führereid (Hitler oath).
- The French newspaper Paris-Soir published the suppressed details of Hindenburg's 'last wish' for the restoration of the German monarchy.
- The United States joined the International Labour Organization.
- Born: Armi Kuusela, first-ever Miss Universe, in Muhos, Finland; Tom Mangold, broadcaster, journalist and author, in Hamburg, Germany

== August 21, 1934 (Tuesday) ==
- An international Jewish conference in Geneva declared that the boycotting of Nazi Germany would be redoubled until the rights of German Jews were fully restored. Rabbi Stephen Samuel Wise said that the boycott would not be abandoned until the Nazi regime canceled every law or practice "violating human freedom, political equality and the ideals of civilization."
- The Minneapolis general strike ended after three months. Martial law was ordered lifted from the city.
- Benito Mussolini met Austrian Chancellor Kurt Schuschnigg in Florence.

== August 22, 1934 (Wednesday) ==
- Al Capone was imprisoned at the new Alcatraz Federal Penitentiary in San Francisco Bay.
- In Warsaw, Polish newspaper editor and former Treasury Minister Ignacy Matuszewski fought a duel with Professor Wladimir Lednizcki. The professor accused Matuszewski of slandering his late father, a lawyer who committed suicide after a company he was representing lost a case. Matuszewski was shot and seriously wounded, but survived.
- Born: Norman Schwarzkopf, Jr., U.S. Army general, in Trenton, New Jersey (d. 2012)

== August 23, 1934 (Thursday) ==
- It was announced that the Canadian government would move 40,000 Canadian families with 500,000 head of starving livestock out of parts of Saskatchewan and Manitoba stricken by drought in the Dust Bowl.
- Born: Sonny Jurgensen, American football player, in Wilmington, North Carolina
- Died: Viktor Kaplan, 57, Austrian engineer; Homer Van Meter, 28, American criminal (shot by police)

== August 24, 1934 (Friday) ==
- Eugenics officials in Nazi Germany issued Ten Commandments for marriage. Number 5 proclaimed, "As a German choose only a spouse of the same or Nordic blood", while Number 10 said, "You should want to have as many children as possible."
- American journalist Dorothy Thompson received a letter from the Gestapo ordering her to leave Germany, citing what it called "numerous anti-German articles in the American press."
- The U.S. and Cuban governments signed a reciprocal trade agreement to strengthen economic ties between the two countries.

== August 25, 1934 (Saturday) ==
- The coat of arms of Jordan was made the official emblem of the country.
- Hack Wilson of the Philadelphia Phillies played in his final major league game, getting a 2-RBI base hit as a pinch hitter against the Pittsburgh Pirates.
- Born:
  - Eddie Ilarde, radio and television host and politician, in Iriga City, Philippines (d. 2020)
  - Akbar Hashemi Rafsanjani, politician and writer, in Bahreman, Persia (d. 2017)
  - Dietrich Unkrodt, German tubist and double bass player, in Neustadt, Upper Silesia, Nazi Germany (d. 2006)

== August 26, 1934 (Sunday) ==
- The biggest boxing event ever staged in Germany was held in Hamburg, as 90,000 fans watched former champion Max Schmeling begin his bid for a comeback by knocking out Walter Neusel in the ninth round.
- Born: Tom Heinsohn, basketball player, in Jersey City, New Jersey (d. 2020)

== August 27, 1934 (Monday) ==
- The government of Northern Ireland issued an order preventing Blueshirt leader Eoin O'Duffy from entering.
- Canadian Prime Minister R. B. Bennett unveiled a stone cross in Gaspé, Quebec to mark the 400th anniversary of Jacques Cartier's arrival.
- Herb Pennock of the Boston Red Sox appeared in his final major league game, giving up 5 runs in 4 innings against the Cleveland Indians.
- The musical revue Life Begins at 8:40 with music by Harold Arlen and lyrics by Ira Gershwin and E.Y. Harburg opened at the Winter Garden Theatre on Broadway.
- Died: Linda Agostini, 28, English-born Australian murder victim

== August 28, 1934 (Tuesday) ==
- Muckraking author Upton Sinclair won the Democratic Party nomination for Governor of California.
- The Challenge International de Tourisme aviation contest opened in Warsaw, Poland.
- The mural painting Nightmare of 1934, satirizing the Roosevelt Administration despite being funded by the PWA, was placed on exhibition at the Westchester Galleries of Fine Arts in Tarrytown, New York. The identity of the mysterious painter was only given as Jeremiah II.

== August 29, 1934 (Wednesday) ==
- Andrés Ignacio Menéndez became President of El Salvador.
- The adventure film The Count of Monte Cristo starring Robert Donat and Elissa Landi was released.

== August 30, 1934 (Thursday) ==
- Nazi Germany ordered workers under 25 years of age to surrender their jobs to older unemployed men, especially fathers of large families. All employers would be required to submit reports to the labour office divulging the number of workers they employed under the age of 25 and what measures they would be taking to replace them.
- Charles Edward, Duke of Saxe-Coburg and Gotha told reporters during a visit to Quebec City that he supported the policies of Nazi Germany and was a personal friend of Hitler.
- Born: Helen Craig, illustrator and author of children's books, in London, England; Jean-Guy Gendron, ice hockey player and coach, in Montreal, Quebec, Canada (d. 2022); Anatoly Solonitsyn, actor, in Bogorodsk, Gorkovskaya Oblast, USSR (d. 1982)
- Died: Charles Dillingham, 66, American Broadway producer; Ernst von Wolzogen, 79, German critic and writer

== August 31, 1934 (Friday) ==
- The German press office announced that 65,000 Jews had emigrated from Germany since Hitler became chancellor on January 30, 1933. 21,000 of them had gone to France, 10,000 to Palestine, 8,000 to Poland and 4,000 to Czechoslovakia.
- The Nightmare of 1934 painting was vandalized by an illegal immigrant who set it on fire because he found it offensive to the Roosevelt family.
- Born: Heinz Goll, sculptor, in Klagenfurt, Austria (d. 1999)
