= June 1934 =

Month of 1934

<<	June 1934					>>
Su	Mo	Tu	We	Th	Fr	Sa
					1	2
3	4	5	6	7	8	9
10	11	12	13	14	15	16
17	18	19	20	21	22	23
24	25	26	27	28	29	30

The following events occurred in June 1934:

== June 1, 1934 (Friday) ==
- Germany and Yugoslavia signed a trade agreement.
- U.S. President Franklin D. Roosevelt sent a message to Congress on war debts, reminding the debtor nations that America still expected the 12 billion 350 million dollars it was owed.
- The comedy-drama film Little Miss Marker starring Shirley Temple was released.
- Born: Pat Boone, singer, actor and writer, in Jacksonville, Florida; Ken McElroy, criminal, in Nodaway County, Missouri (d. 1981)

== June 2, 1934 (Saturday) ==
- 39 nations signed the London Act, an agreement on a complete revision of international conventions on copyright, patents, trademarks and designs.
- Died: James Rolph, 64, 27th Governor of California

== June 3, 1934 (Sunday) ==
- The Auto-Lite strike in Toledo, Ohio, ended.
- The American Musicological Society was organized and incorporated in New York.
- The Party of the Right won partial general elections in Luxembourg.
- Dayton Speedway officially opened in Ohio.
- Born: Rolland D. McCune, theologian, near Berne, Indiana (d. 2019)

== June 4, 1934 (Monday) ==
- Britain informed the United States that it would make no more payments on its $5 billion war debt. The note explained that resumption of the payments "would be a re-creation of the conditions which existed prior to the world crisis and were in a large measure responsible for it. Such procedure would throw a bombshell into the European arena which would have financial and economic repercussions over all five continents and would postpone indefinitely the chances of world recovery."
- Mobs in Germany smashed the windows of the American-owned Woolworth department stores in reprisal for American boycotting of German goods.
- Born: Monica Dacon, schoolteacher and politician, in Saint Vincent and the Grenadines; Daphne Sheldrick, author and conservationist, in Kenya (d. 2018)

== June 5, 1934 (Tuesday) ==
- A powerful hurricane made landfall in British Honduras. Over the next four days between 1,000 and 3,000 people in Central America were killed by massive floods and landslides.
- Born: Bill Moyers, journalist and political commentator, in Hugo, Oklahoma (d. 2025)
- Died: Fred C. Ainsworth, 81, United States Army surgeon

== June 6, 1934 (Wednesday) ==
- An attempted coup began in Lithuania, launched by supporters of former prime minister Augustinas Voldemaras.
- The Securities Exchange Act was inaugurated in the United States.
- Myril Hoag of the New York Yankees went 6-for-6 in a game.
- Born: Albert II of Belgium, in Laeken, Brussels, Belgium

== June 7, 1934 (Thursday) ==
- The Lithuanian coup attempt was put down. Voldemaras was arrested and imprisoned as a result.
- Ernst Röhm announced he was going on sick leave, but issued a statement: "If the enemies of the S.A. hope that the S.A. will not be recalled, or will be recalled only in part after its leave, we may permit them to enjoy this brief hope. They will receive their answer at such time and in such form as appears necessary. The S.A. is and remains the destiny of Germany."
- British Fascist Sir Oswald Mosley attempted to give a speech in front of almost 10,000 people at Olympia in London. Mosley had difficulty being heard as anti-fascists drowned him out with booing and heckling, and then he lost the audience's attention as people began climbing on the girders overhead. The event was called off after two hours.

== June 8, 1934 (Friday) ==
- Railway lines, power plants and telephone lines across Austria were sabotaged in a wave of bombings.
- The Cincinnati Reds became the first major league baseball team to travel by airplane when they flew from Cincinnati to Chicago.
- The Civil War-era romance film Operator 13 starring Marion Davies and Gary Cooper was released.
- Died: Dorothy Dell, 19, American actress (car accident)

== June 9, 1934 (Saturday) ==
- An unexploded bomb was found in the Austrian chancellory, inside a desk in an unused room above the offices of Vice Chancellor Starhemberg.
- Romania, Poland and the Soviet Union signed an agreement to recognize each other's borders. In doing so the Soviets recognized the loss of Bessarabia to Romania for the first time.
- Czechoslovakia formally recognized the Soviet Union.
- The cartoon character Donald Duck made his debut in the Walt Disney short The Wise Little Hen.
- Olin Dutra won the U.S. Open golf tournament.
- Peace Chance won the Belmont Stakes horse race.
- Born: Don Manoukian, American football player and professional wrestler, in Merced, California (d. 2014)

== June 10, 1934 (Sunday) ==
- Romania resumed diplomatic relations with the Soviet Union.
- Italy defeated Czechoslovakia 2-1 in the FIFA World Cup Final in Rome.
- In an interview with Randolph Churchill for the Daily Mail, the former Kaiser Wilhelm II said that "Hitler has done marvelous work in putting new life and soul into the German nation."
- Died: Frederick Delius, 72, English composer
- Born: Brian Ford Baldock CBE, British businessman

== June 11, 1934 (Monday) ==
- The Geneva Disarmament Conference ended in failure.
- The newspaper comic strip Mandrake the Magician was first published.
- Died: Lev Vygotsky, 37, Russian developmental psychologist

== June 12, 1934 (Tuesday) ==
- The Reciprocal Tariff Act was enacted in the United States.
- The Bulgarian dictatorship abolished all political parties.
- Born: Tony Ferrer, actor and filmmaker, in Pampanga, Philippines (d. 2021)

== June 13, 1934 (Wednesday) ==
- Joseph Goebbels flew to Warsaw, Poland, to give a lecture at the University of Warsaw about Nazism. Goebbels and his entourage were under heavy police protection due to the storm of protest the news of the visit had engendered.
- Died: Charlie Gardiner, Scottish-born Canadian ice hockey player, in Winnipeg

== June 14, 1934 (Thursday) ==
- Adolf Hitler flew to Venice to meet Benito Mussolini for the first time. Hitler mistakenly believed the meeting was to be a quiet and private discussion, and was embarrassed to have arrived in a suit and ill-fitting raincoat when Mussolini greeted him dressed in full military uniform in front of 200 journalists. Their discussions over the next couple of days proved unproductive with the two clashing on the matter of Austria.
- The Australian Eastern Mission, led by deputy prime minister John Latham, returned to Australia after a three-month tour of East and South-East Asia.
- Max Baer won the world heavyweight boxing title with an 11th-round knockout of Primo Carnera at Madison Square Garden Bowl in Queens, New York.

== June 15, 1934 (Friday) ==
- Cuban President Carlos Mendieta narrowly avoided an assassination attempt when a bomb exploded directly behind his chair during a luncheon. Mendieta was wounded and two naval officers were killed.
- Died: Bronisław Pieracki, 39, Minister of the Interior of Poland (assassinated)

== June 16, 1934 (Saturday) ==
- Hitler aide Ernst Hanfstaengl attended his 25th anniversary class reunion at Harvard University, despite noisy demonstrations from protestors.
- Born: Eileen Atkins, actress, in London, England; Kumari Kamala, dancer and actress, in Mayuram, Madras Presidency, British India; William F. Sharpe, economist, in Boston, Massachusetts

== June 17, 1934 (Sunday) ==
- Marburg speech: German Vice-Chancellor Franz von Papen made a speech at the University of Marburg calling for a restoration of freedoms, saying that "open manly discussions" would be a greater service to the German people than "the present state of the German press", and that "Great men are not created by propaganda." It was "only by talking things over with people", Papen said, that "confidence and devotion can be maintained." Joseph Goebbels actively tried to suppress the speech by banning any references to it in the media, but texts of the speech were reproduced in the foreign press as well as Papen's own newspaper.
- Gunmen in Havana opened fire on a parade of a secret political organization known as the ABC. Marchers prepared for such an attack returned fire, and police dispersed the battle with gas bombs. A total of 12 people were killed.
- The first of the Brighton trunk murders came to light in Brighton, England.

== June 18, 1934 (Monday) ==
- France introduced air service between Algiers and Brazzaville in the French Congo.
- The Indian Reorganization Act was enacted in the United States.

== June 19, 1934 (Tuesday) ==
- President Roosevelt signed the Communications Act of 1934 into law.
- The Rules Enabling Act was enacted in the United States.
- It became known that President Hindenburg had sent Franz von Papen a congratulatory telegram for Sunday's speech.
- Died: Prince Bernhard of Lippe, 61

== June 20, 1934 (Wednesday) ==
- The German ocean liner SS Dresden struck a rock in a fjord near Haugesund, Norway, ripping a huge hole in its hull. About 100 passengers jumped overboard without waiting for lifeboats and three women died. The ship beached itself at Karmøy Island and was abandoned.
- Born: Samuel Zoll, jurist and politician, in Peabody, Massachusetts (d. 2011)

== June 21, 1934 (Thursday) ==
- Adolf Hitler flew to President Paul von Hindenburg's estate in Neudeck to investigate reports that Hindenburg was considering declaring martial law and handing over power to the military. There he was met by General Werner von Blomberg as well as the President, who confirmed the rumors.
- Franz von Papen and Joseph Goebbels appeared together before foreign correspondents, shaking hands and presenting a scene of harmony.
- Turkey adopted the Surname Law, requiring all Turkish citizens to adopt the use of surnames.

== June 22, 1934 (Friday) ==
- The Status of the Union Act, declaring the Union of South Africa to be a "sovereign independent state", received royal assent.
- Ferdinand Porsche signed a contract with the German government to produce a "people's car" (Volkswagen).

== June 23, 1934 (Saturday) ==
- The Free City of Danzig introduced one-year compulsory labour service for all able-bodied male citizens between 17 and 25 years of age.

== June 24, 1934 (Sunday) ==
- 500 French war veterans rioted in Paris during a march protesting against a cut in their pensions.
- U.S. ambassador to Russia William Christian Bullitt, Jr. was involved in a plane crash at Leningrad, but neither he nor the pilot were injured.
- Died: Jimmy Wedell, 34, American racing pilot and aircraft designer (plane accident)

== June 25, 1934 (Monday) ==
- General Werner von Fritsch put the German army in a state of alert.
- The trial in the John Edward Brownlee sex scandal began. The Premier of Alberta, Canada, was accused of seduction in starting an affair with an 18-year-old woman.
- Born: Beatriz Sheridan, actress and director, in Mexico City (d. 2006)

== June 26, 1934 (Tuesday) ==
- A British jury found Austrian dancer Tilly Losch guilty of adultery with Prince Serge Obolensky and granted her husband the poet Edward James a divorce. Losch's countersuit of "cruelty" making it clear that James was homosexual failed.
- German secret police arrested Edgar Julius Jung for his role in composing the Marburg speech.
- Born: Jeremy Wolfenden, foreign correspondent and spy, in England (d. 1965)
- Died: Max Pallenberg, 56, Austrian singer, actor and comedian

== June 27, 1934 (Wednesday) ==
- A powder mill explosion in Olympia, Washington, killed 11.
- Died: Francesco Buhagiar, 57, 2nd Prime Minister of Malta

== June 28, 1934 (Thursday) ==
- Adolf Hitler attended the wedding of Josef Terboven in Essen, giving himself a pretense for leaving Berlin while plans for a party purge moved forward. Hitler ordered Ernst Röhm and other top SA leaders to hold a meeting June 30 at the Bavarian resort of Bad Wiessee.
- Germany marked the 15th anniversary of the signing of the Treaty of Versailles by flying the flags of all public buildings at half-mast.
- President Roosevelt gave a fireside chat reviewing the achievements of the 73rd Congress.
- The drama film Of Human Bondage starring Bette Davis was released.
- The John Ford-directed drama film The World Moves On premiered at the Criterion Theatre in New York City.
- Born: Carl Levin, politician, in Detroit, Michigan (d. 2021)

== June 29, 1934 (Friday) ==
- The Japanese destroyer Miyuki sank in a collision with another Japanese destroyer in the Korea Strait.
- A carefully timed statement by General Werner von Blomberg was published in the Völkischer Beobachter, affirming that the Reichswehr stood behind Hitler.
- Henry Cotton won the Open Championship golf tournament.
- Lou Gehrig was hit in the head with a pitch and knocked unconscious during an exhibition baseball game in Norfolk, Virginia. When he was taken to hospital his consecutive games played streak was expected to end at 1,414, but Gehrig took an overnight boat to Washington, D.C., and played the next day.

== June 30, 1934 (Saturday) ==
- The purge known as the Night of the Long Knives began in Nazi Germany. Hitler ordered the assassination of approximately 100 people he believed were liable to act against him, including many leaders of the SA. Hitler also took the opportunity to eliminate critics of the regime and settle a few old scores with past political opponents such as former chancellor Kurt von Schleicher and retired politician Gustav Ritter von Kahr. Hitler rode to the resort of Bad Wiessee and personally oversaw the arrest of Ernst Röhm and the other SA leaders gathered there.
- The German cruiser Admiral Graf Spee was launched.
- John Dillinger and his gang robbed the Merchants National Bank of South Bend, Indiana, making off with $29,890.
- The Sumner Tunnel opened in Boston.
- Born: Harry Blackstone Jr., stage magician, in Three Rivers, Michigan (d. 1997)
- Died: Herbert von Bose, 41, German politician; Ferdinand von Bredow, 50, German general; Karl Ernst, 29, German SA leader; Fritz Gerlich, 51, German journalist and historian; Edmund Heines, 36, German SA deputy; Peter von Heydebreck, 44, German Freikorps and SA leader; Gustav Ritter von Kahr, 71, German politician; Erich Klausener, 49, German politician; Kurt von Schleicher, 52, former Chancellor of Germany; Bernhard Stempfle, 51 or 52, German Catholic priest; Gregor Strasser, 42, German politician
