= July 1934 =

Month of 1934

<<	July 1934					>>
Su	Mo	Tu	We	Th	Fr	Sa
1	2	3	4	5	6	7
8	9	10	11	12	13	14
15	16	17	18	19	20	21
22	23	24	25	26	27	28
29	30	31

The following events occurred in July 1934:

== July 1, 1934 (Sunday) ==
- At Stadelheim Prison in Munich, Ernst Röhm was given a pistol with a single bullet with which to commit suicide. When he refused to do so he was shot dead.
- General Werner von Blomberg canceled the state of alarm in the German military.
- Louis Chiron won the French Grand Prix.
- U.S. President Franklin D. Roosevelt boarded the USS Houston in Annapolis, Maryland, and began a 12,000-mile (19,000 km) tour of American possessions in the Atlantic and Pacific Oceans.
- Strict enforcement of the Hays Code began in the Hollywood film industry, lasting until 1968.
- Born: Jamie Farr, actor, in Toledo, Ohio; Jean Marsh, actress and writer, in Stoke Newington, London, England (d. 2025); Sydney Pollack, film director, producer and actor, in Lafayette, Indiana (d. 2008)
- Died: Edgar Julius Jung, 40, German lawyer; Ernst Röhm, 46, German SA commander; Emil Sembach, 43, German SS-Oberführer

== July 2, 1934 (Monday) ==
- The last of the executions in the Night of the Long Knives purge took place by 4 a.m.
- German President Paul von Hindenburg sent a message congratulating Hitler for his "determined action and gallant personal intervention which have nipped treason in the bud and rescued the German people from great danger."

== July 3, 1934 (Tuesday) ==
- Another wave of attacks on public buildings swept through Austria as dynamite exploded near a police headquarters in Salzburg and a mysterious fire broke out at the Rathaus.
- Hitler had his cabinet approve a measure that declared, "The measures taken on June 30, July 1 and 2 to suppress treasonous assaults are legal as acts of self-defence by the State."
- The jury in the John Edward Brownlee sex scandal awarded $15,000 to Brownlee's accuser Vivian MacMillan and her father. In an unusual move, however, the judge dismissed the case. It would go all the way to the Supreme Court of Canada before the MacMillans finally won their damages.
- The Bank of Canada Act was passed in Canada.

== July 4, 1934 (Wednesday) ==
- The Parliamentary mace of Upper Canada, seized by the Americans in the Battle of York during the War of 1812, was formally returned to Canada in a goodwill ceremony at Fort York in Toronto.
- Born: Richard A. Jensen, theologian and author, in Fremont, Nebraska (d. 2014)
- Died: Marie Curie, 66, Polish-born French physicist and chemist and Nobel laureate; Hayim Nahman Bialik, 61, Ukrainian-born Jewish poet

== July 5, 1934 (Thursday) ==
- "Bloody Thursday": Violence flared in the West Coast waterfront strike as picketers in San Francisco fought with police on Rincon Hill after local industrial interests tried to move cargo from piers using non-union labor under police protection. 2 were killed and 69 were reported injured.
- President Roosevelt arrived at Cap-Haïtien, Haiti to a 21-gun salute, the first president to visit Haiti while in office. Roosevelt delivered a speech, partly in French, announcing the withdrawal of U.S. Marines from the country by October.

== July 6, 1934 (Friday) ==
- Members of the U.S. Navy rioted in Nice after an American sailor of the USS Arkansas was shot in the neck by a French police officer. The officer said that he stopped the sailor for harassing a girl on the street and that he fired in self-defense when the sailor attacked him. A total of 27 people were injured in several café brawls.
- Fred Perry of the United Kingdom defeated Jack Crawford of Australia in the Gentlemen's Singles final at Wimbledon. It was the first time in 25 years that an Englishman won the title.
- California Governor Frank Merriam issued a statement following the violence of the previous day, saying that the leaders of the strikers were "not free from communist and subversive influences" and appealing to "the saner clear-thinking workers to oppose courageously and insistently any effort to involve other groups of labor in a controversy which has gone beyond the bounds of ordinary and legitimate disputes between employers and employees."
- President Roosevelt visited San Juan, Puerto Rico.

== July 7, 1934 (Saturday) ==
- Dorothy Round Little of the United Kingdom defeated the American Helen Hull Jacobs in the Ladies' Singles final at Wimbledon.
- President Roosevelt visited Saint Thomas, U.S. Virgin Islands.

== July 8, 1934 (Sunday) ==
- Rudolf Hess gave a nationally broadcast speech in Königsberg in which he switched to French at one point and appealed to France for peace, saying, "I turn to the comrades of the front, both here and on the other side of the trenches. Be honest: didn't we experience horror at the thought of death? When hand grenades were hurled at us, when poisonous gas threatened to choke us despite our gas masks, when we heard the cries of anguish from the dying, when horror of every kind surrounded us, did we not ask ourselves, 'Cannot humanity be spared all this?' ... I say as a veteran to veterans across the borderland, I as a leader of one people ask the leaders of other peoples: Must this be? Can we not by mutual good spare humanity another war?" This part of the speech caused an immediate sensation among diplomats as it was interpreted as insinuating that Germany anticipated being invaded by France, while some in the French press viewed it as an attempt to create a distraction from the recent purge.
- Teamsters of San Francisco and Oakland voted to go on strike in solidarity with the West Coast waterfront strikers.
- Born: Marty Feldman, comedian and actor, in London, England (d. 1982)
- Died: Benjamin Baillaud, 84, French astronomer

== July 9, 1934 (Monday) ==
- Plans of the new SA chief Viktor Lutze to reorganize the Brownshirts were announced. The organization was to cull its numbers from 2.5 million down to 800,000 and return to the original purpose for which the SA was formed – providing protection at Nazi party meetings.
- The directorate of Der Stahlhelm in Germany were ordered to take a general vacation until August 18. No uniforms of the organization were to be worn during this time except at parades in which other organizations participate and on August 3 when military exercises commemorating the 20th anniversary of the outbreak of the World War were to be held.
- First Lady Eleanor Roosevelt visited the Century of Progress International Exposition in Chicago and gave a radio address from a replica of the Globe Theatre in which she praised the motion picture industry for adopting a code of voluntary censorship. "Lately it has been felt that the tendency to glorify the racketeer and criminal, or at least to make him appear a sympathetic character, was having something of a bad effect upon the children of the country", Mrs. Roosevelt said. "Consequently this new announcement should do much to make these organizations feel that the film industry as a whole desires to co-operate and use its tremendous power for the improvement of the country."

== July 10, 1934 (Tuesday) ==
- The second Major League Baseball All-Star Game was held at the Polo Grounds in New York City. The American League beat the National League 9-7. The game is mainly remembered for Carl Hubbell's five strikeouts of the game's best hitters – future Hall of Famers Babe Ruth, Lou Gehrig, Jimmie Foxx, Al Simmons and Joe Cronin – all in succession.
- Hitler summoned the Reichstag to convene on Friday for its first meeting since January 30.
- In the French Congo, a railway line connecting Pointe-Noire with Brazzaville opened.
- President Roosevelt visited Cartagena, Colombia.
- Born: Alfred Biolek, Czech-born German entertainer and television producer, in Freistadt (d. 2021); Jerry Nelson, puppeteer, in Tulsa, Oklahoma (d. 2012)
- Died: Erich Mühsam, 56, German anarchist, poet and playwright (murdered at Oranienburg concentration camp)

== July 11, 1934 (Wednesday) ==
- The USS Houston passed through the Panama Canal with President Roosevelt aboard. This was the first time a U.S. president passed through the completed canal while in office. After passing through he gave a speech rededicating the canal to "all nations in the needs of peaceful commerce."

An F4 tornado was reported in Kiuruvesi, Finland.

- Will H. Hays held a conference with the heads of Hollywood's biggest motion picture companies. After the conference the following statement was issued: "To strengthen the system of industrial self-regulation established by the Motion Picture Producers and Distributors of America the following member companies of that association have agreed that each will grant to exhibitors the right to omit the exhibition of any motion picture released prior to July 15, 1934, against which there is a genuine protest on moral grounds." Ten film production company names were then listed. The introduction of a distinctive seal of approval was also announced, which would appear on the screen following the main title of films released after July 15 to show that every effort had been taken to ensure that the film was in compliance with the clean picture code. The age of Pre-Code Hollywood was over.
- Born: Giorgio Armani, fashion designer, in Piacenza, Italy (d. 2025)

== July 12, 1934 (Thursday) ==
- The wearing of political party uniforms was banned in Belgium.
- National Recovery Administration head Hugh S. Johnson made some controversial remarks during a speech in Waterloo, Iowa, in which he said that conditions in Germany made him "actively sick", adding, "The idea that adult responsible men can be taken from their homes – stood up against a wall, backs to rifles, and shot to death – is beyond expression."
- Born: Van Cliburn, pianist, in Shreveport, Louisiana (d. 2013)

== July 13, 1934 (Friday) ==
- Adolf Hitler gave a nationally broadcast 90-minute speech to the Reichstag justifying the Night of the Long Knives, accusing the purged individuals of treason and plotting revolt.
- A member of the German embassy to the United States lodged a protest with the U.S. Department of State over Hugh S. Johnson's remarks of the previous day. The Department of State issued an announcement saying that it was "to be regretted that the position occupied by the recovery administrator made it possible for remarks by him as an individual to be misconstrued as official."
- Austrian Chancellor Engelbert Dollfuss issued a decree giving five days to turn in all explosives to the government. Anyone caught with them after the five-day period faced execution.
- Babe Ruth hit the 700th home run of his major league career at Navin Field in Detroit.
- The World Moves On became the first film to receive the new Motion Picture Production Code certificate.
- The comedy film The Old Fashioned Way starring W. C. Fields was released.
- Born: Wole Soyinka, playwright and poet, in Abeokuta, Nigeria Protectorate; Aleksei Yeliseyev, cosmonaut, in Zhizdra, USSR
- Died: Kate Sheppard, 87, English-born New Zealander suffragist

== July 14, 1934 (Saturday) ==
- Germany's new People's Court (Volksgerichtshof) was inaugurated as 32 judges appointed by Hitler were sworn into office. The court's first tasks were to settle the fate of SA members arrested since the Night of the Long Knives as well as communists imprisoned over the past year.
- Racer Kaye Don was found guilty of manslaughter in the death of his mechanic in a May 28 auto accident on the Isle of Man.
- A dynamite blast wrecked an electric plant at Opponitz, Austria.
- Buster Keaton filed for bankruptcy.
- Born: John Tyndall, politician, in Exeter, Devon, England (d. 2005)

== July 15, 1934 (Sunday) ==
- An additional 2,000 National Guardsmen were sent to San Francisco to augment the 2,000 already there as tensions rose high in the West Coast waterfront strike on the eve of a general strike.
- The second of the Brighton trunk murders was discovered in Brighton, England.
- Hans Stuck won the German Grand Prix.
- Born: Bill Gunn, playwright, novelist, actor and director, in Philadelphia, Pennsylvania (d. 1989); Harrison Birtwistle, composer, in Accrington, England (d. 2022)
- Died: Louis F. Gottschalk, 69, American composer and conductor

== July 16, 1934 (Monday) ==
- A general strike began in San Francisco. Amid isolated reports of violence, business leaders sent an appeal to California Governor Frank Merriam to impose martial law. Merriam released a statement from his office that night saying that "If the troops now in service prove inadequate I shall take whatever steps may become necessary to serve the general good", and expressing his "earnest hope that reason and restraint will dominate the activities and the deliberations of the strikers themselves."
- The Third Constitution of Brazil was promulgated.

== July 17, 1934 (Tuesday) ==
- Leaders of the San Francisco general strike opted to seek arbitration and asked the Roosevelt Administration to intercede.
- A suspect in the Brighton trunk murders was arrested.

== July 18, 1934 (Wednesday) ==
- A 7.7 magnitude earthquake struck southwest Panama, the most severe earthquake in Panamanian history.
- King George V opened the Queensway Tunnel, the longest underwater tunnel in the world at the time.
- Died: Sy Sanborn, 67, American sportswriter

== July 19, 1934 (Thursday) ==
- San Francisco's general strike was called off after 77 hours.

== July 20, 1934 (Friday) ==
- 68 were injured in a day of fighting during the Minneapolis general strike. Police fired into a mob of protestors when they attempted to block a delivery truck trying to leave the central market.

== July 21, 1934 (Saturday) ==
- Flood waters of the Vistula swept into Warsaw, Poland, forcing many people from their homes. The flooding left an estimated 200,000 homeless throughout the country.
- Born: Jonathan Miller, theatre director and actor, in London, England (d. 2019)
- Died: Julian Hawthorne, 88, American writer and journalist; Hubert Lyautey, 79, French general

== July 22, 1934 (Sunday) ==
- U.S. agents shot and killed the notorious criminal John Dillinger as he walked out of a movie theatre in Chicago after a screening of the film Manhattan Melodrama.
- Died: John Dillinger, 31, American criminal (shot)

== July 23, 1934 (Monday) ==
- The Soviet Union sentenced 8 men to death for sabotaging trains and railways, purportedly as spies for Japan.

== July 24, 1934 (Tuesday) ==
- A Czechoslovak socialist was hanged in Vienna just three days after bombing a railway, as the Dollfuss government began carrying out its threat to execute convicted terrorists.
- President Roosevelt arrived in Hawaii, the first sitting U.S. president to visit there. Roosevelt received Territorial Governor Joseph Poindexter aboard the USS Houston (CA-30) but did not actually go ashore until the following day.
- Born: P. S. Soosaithasan, Tamil politician, in Sri Lanka (d. 2017)

== July 25, 1934 (Wednesday) ==
- July Putsch: Austrian Nazis launched a coup against the government of Engelbert Dollfuss, storming the chancellery and shooting him in the neck, then allowing him to bleed to death while they barricaded themselves. Meanwhile, other Nazis seized a radio station and broadcast word that Dollfuss had resigned. The coup failed when the conspirators in the chancellery surrendered after more than six hours when they received a guarantee of safe conduct to Germany, only to be told it was revoked when it was discovered that Dollfuss was dead. Benito Mussolini happened to be hosting the late chancellor's wife and children at Riccione when he received word of the assassination, and it fell to him to break the news to them.
- President Roosevelt visited Kīlauea volcano.
- Australia adopted a three-year military expansion program.
- Died: François Coty, 60, French perfumer; Engelbert Dollfuss, 41, Chancellor of Austria (assassinated); Nestor Makhno, 45, Ukrainian anarcho-communist revolutionary (tuberculosis)

== July 26, 1934 (Thursday) ==
- Ernst Rüdiger Starhemberg became acting chancellor of Austria.
- Mussolini, anticipating a German attempt to invade and annex Austria, ordered 48,000 troops rushed to the Austro-Italian border to serve notice that he would not tolerate such a move.
- Minnesota Governor Floyd B. Olson declared martial law in Minneapolis due to the strike.
- President Roosevelt reviewed 15,000 American troops in Honolulu.
- Newspapers in Dublin stopped printing when compositors and linotype operators went on strike.
- Died: Winsor McCay, American cartoonist and animator

== July 27, 1934 (Friday) ==
- The Swissair Tuttlingen accident occurred in southern Germany. All 12 aboard were killed in the crash, making it the worst air disaster of 1934.
- Born: Ajahn Sumedho, Buddhist teacher, in Seattle, Washington

== July 28, 1934 (Saturday) ==
- The funeral of Engelbert Dollfuss was held in front of the Vienna Rathaus.
- A manned high-altitude balloon launched from the Black Hills of South Dakota achieved a near-record altitude of 60,613 feet (18,475 m), but then began descending rapidly due to tears in the fabric. The hydrogen then ignited and destroyed the balloon, but not before all three crew were able to escape and parachute to safety.
- Before departing Hawaii, President Roosevelt gave a speech in which he said that America's defense forces "must ever be considered an instrument of continuing peace, for our nation's policy seeks peace and does not look to imperialistic aims."
- Born: Bud Luckey, cartoonist, animator and voice actor, in Billings, Montana (d. 2018)
- Died: Marie Dressler, 65, Canadian-American actress; Louis Tancred, 57, South African cricketer; Edith Yorke, 66, English actress

== July 29, 1934 (Sunday) ==
- The West Coast waterfront strike ended as the National Longshoreman's board announced that the longshoremen would return to work on Tuesday at all coast ports.
- Kurt Schuschnigg became Chancellor of Austria.
- Antonin Magne won the Tour de France.
- René Dreyfus won the Belgian Grand Prix.

== July 30, 1934 (Monday) ==
- The court-martial of those involved in the July Putsch began in Austria. Both conspirators who testified said that the killing of Dollfuss was an accident.
- Stanley Baldwin made a famous quote in the House of Commons when he said, "Since the day of the air, the old frontiers are gone. When you think of the defence of England you no longer think of the chalk cliffs of Dover; you think of the Rhine. That is where our frontier lines."
- The Western film The Star Packer starring John Wayne was released.
- Born: Bud Selig, baseball commissioner, in Milwaukee, Wisconsin

== July 31, 1934 (Tuesday) ==
- The first two men put on trial for the July Putsch were found guilty of high treason and hanged. Few were present for the execution, but it was reported that both men shouted "Heil Hitler!" on the gallows.
