= September 1934 =

<<	September 1934					>>
Su	Mo	Tu	We	Th	Fr	Sa
						1
2	3	4	5	6	7	8
9	10	11	12	13	14	15
16	17	18	19	20	21	22
23	24	25	26	27	28	29
30

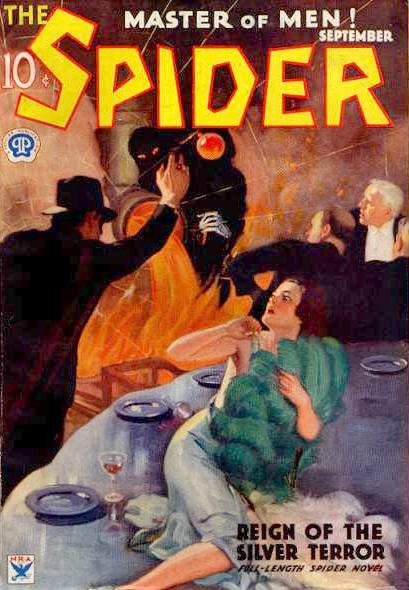
Cover of the pulp magazine The Spider (September 1934) featuring Reign of the Silver Terror by Norvell Page

The following events occurred in September 1934:

== September 1, 1934 (Saturday) ==
- The textile worker's strike began in the United States as approximately 1 million workers walked off the job shortly before midnight.
- José María Velasco Ibarra became President of Ecuador.
- A speaker and security camera brand, Toa Corporation was founded in Kobe, Japan, as predecessor name was Toa Special Electric Works.

== September 2, 1934 (Sunday) ==
- Limerick and Dublin played to a draw in the All-Ireland Senior Hurling Championship Final. A rematch was held on September 28.
- Born: Grady Nutt, Southern Baptist minister and humorist, in Amarillo, Texas (d. 1982)
- Died: Russ Columbo, 26, American singer, violinist and actor (shot in accident); Alcide Nunez, 50, American jazz clarinetist

== September 3, 1934 (Monday) ==
- Evangeline Booth was elected General of the Salvation Army, the first woman to hold the position.

== September 4, 1934 (Tuesday) ==
- 8 were killed by bombs in Havana during a nationwide strike of government workers. President Carlos Mendieta promised a relaxation of martial law.
- Evelyn Waugh's novel A Handful of Dust was first published in full.
- Born: Clive Granger, economist and Nobel laureate, in Swansea, Wales (d. 2009); Eduard Khil, baritone singer, in Smolensk, USSR (d. 2012)

== September 5, 1934 (Wednesday) ==
- 11,000 public transit workers went on strike in Tokyo, Japan.
- The 8th Nuremberg Rally formally opened in Nazi Germany. Adolf Wagner read a proclamation written by Hitler which first established the concept of a "Thousand Year Reich", declaring that the Nazi revolution was complete and there were to be no more revolutions in Germany for the next 1,000 years.
- The first known victim of the notorious Cleveland Torso Murderer, the Lady of the Lake, was discovered on the shore of Lake Erie.

== September 6, 1934 (Thursday) ==
- Hitler reviewed a parade of 52,000 young labourers on the Nuremberg Rally grounds.

== September 7, 1934 (Friday) ==
- Hitler addressed 350,000 party members and spectators at Nuremberg.
- Born: Little Milton, blues singer and guitarist, in Inverness, Mississippi (d. 2005)

== September 8, 1934 (Saturday) ==
- The ocean liner Morro Castle caught fire off the coast of New Jersey. Only six of the twelve lifeboats were lowered and a total of 137 people died in the disaster.
- Gunshots were fired at the home of Austrian Vice-Chancellor Ernst Rüdiger Starhemberg. After a commotion the shots were attributed to a careless guard who bumped his rifle against a wall.
- Born: Peter Maxwell Davies, composer and conductor, in Salford, Lancashire, England (d. 2016)

== September 9, 1934 (Sunday) ==
- 7,000 police and guardsmen were dispatched to London's Hyde Park, looking to head off any potential violence on the occasion of a rally by 1,200 members of Oswald Mosley's British Union of Fascists. About 8,000 to 9,000 anti-fascists and onlookers also turned out, but the police cordon was so thick that no one on the outside of it could hear the speeches. A total of eighteen arrests were made, mostly for disorderly conduct.
- Rudolf Caracciola and Luigi Fagioli won the Italian Grand Prix.
- The Little King, a comic strip by Otto Soglow that had appeared in The New Yorker for several years, made its debut in its new form of a newspaper comic strip.
- Died: Roger Fry, 67, English painter and critic

== September 10, 1934 (Monday) ==
- The 8th Nuremberg Rally ended with a closing address by Hitler.
- Police were called upon to end the Costa Rican banana workers' strike, firing on strike leaders and arresting others.
- Born: Charles Kuralt, journalist, in Wilmington, North Carolina (d. 1997); Roger Maris, baseball player, in Hibbing, Minnesota (d. 1985)

== September 11, 1934 (Tuesday) ==
- Cuban officials revealed the confiscation of five mail packages containing bombs addressed to American ambassador Jefferson Caffery.
- Born: Ian Abercrombie, actor, in Grays, Essex, England (d. 2012)

== September 12, 1934 (Wednesday) ==
- Lithuania, Latvia and Estonia signed a treaty of mutual support that led to the formation of the Baltic Entente.
- The mystery film Charlie Chan in London starring Warner Oland was released.
- Died: Catherine Breshkovsky, 90, Russian socialist

== September 13, 1934 (Thursday) ==
- The J. B. Priestley play Eden End premiered at the Duchess Theatre in London.

== September 14, 1934 (Friday) ==
- Nazi Germany appealed to brides to help save the country's gold reserves by substituting gold wedding rings for those made of white alloy instead.
- Soviet Russia reaffirmed its claim to Herald Island by hoisting a Soviet flag there.
- Born: Sarah Kofman, philosopher, in Paris, France (d. 1994)

== September 15, 1934 (Saturday) ==
- The Australian federal election was held. The incumbent United Australia Party led by Prime Minister Joseph Lyons retained its plurality in the House of Representatives, but lost its absolute majority and would have to rely on a coalition with the Country Party to remain in power.
- Born:
  - Fred Nile, politician, in Kings Cross, New South Wales, Australia (d. 2026)
  - Fob James, American politician and Governor of Alabama from 1979 to 1983, and from 1995 to 1999

== September 16, 1934 (Sunday) ==
- Poland won the Challenge International de Tourisme aviation contest in Warsaw.
- William Randolph Hearst met with Adolf Hitler in Berlin.
- Born: Elgin Baylor, basketball player, coach and executive, in Washington, D.C. (d. 2021); Ronnie Drew, folk musician and actor, in Dún Laoghaire, Ireland (d. 2008)

== September 17, 1934 (Monday) ==
- Albania restored diplomatic relations with the USSR, which were severed in December 1924.
- Nome, Alaska, was virtually destroyed by fire.
- Born: Maureen Connolly, tennis player, in San Diego, California (d. 1969); Binoy Majumdar, poet, in Burma (d. 2006)

== September 18, 1934 (Tuesday) ==
- The League of Nations voted to admit the Soviet Union, 39 to 3.
- Benito Mussolini ordered compulsory military service for all Italian boys above the age of 8.
- Sam Rice of the Cleveland Indians played in his final major league game, going 3-for-5 with a double against the Washington Senators.
- Died: Ruth Hale, 46 or 47, American writer and feminist

== September 19, 1934 (Wednesday) ==
- Bruno Hauptmann was arrested in the Lindbergh kidnapping.
- Born: Brian Epstein, businessman and manager of the Beatles, in Liverpool, England (d. 1967)
- Died: Lorin C. Woolley, 77, American Mormon fundamentalist leader

== September 20, 1934 (Thursday) ==
- Wrestling champion Jim Londos defeated Ed "Strangler" Lewis before a crowd of 35,265 at Wrigley Field in Chicago, the biggest crowd in pro wrestling history to that point.
- Burleigh Grimes of the Pittsburgh Pirates played in his final major league game, pitching a scoreless inning against the Brooklyn Dodgers.
- Born: Takayuki Kubota, karate master and founder of the International Karate Association, in Kumamoto, Japan (d. 2024); Sophia Loren, actress, in Rome, Italy; David Marquand, academic and politician, in Cardiff, Wales (d. 2024); Jeff Morris, actor, in St. Joseph, Missouri (d. 2004); Rajinder Puri, cartoonist and activist, in Karachi, British Raj (d. 2015)

== September 21, 1934 (Friday) ==
- The Muroto typhoon struck Japan, killing over 2,700 people.
- Paul Dean of the St. Louis Cardinals pitched a 3-0 no-hitter against the Brooklyn Dodgers. It was the second game of a doubleheader; in the first game, Paul's brother Dizzy Dean also pitched a complete-game shutout of the Dodgers.
- Born:
  - Leonard Cohen, musician, poet and novelist, in Westmount, Quebec (d. 2016)
  - Benjamin Abalos, politician, in Pangasinan, Philippines

== September 22, 1934 (Saturday) ==
- Gresford disaster: 266 were killed in north-east Wales when a coal mine exploded.
- The United Textile Workers of America called off the three-week-old textile worker's strike.
- The stage musical The Great Waltz premiered at the Center Theatre on Broadway.
- Born: Lute Olson, basketball coach, in Mayville, North Dakota (d. 2020)

== September 23, 1934 (Sunday) ==
- Ludwig Müller was proclaimed the supreme head of the German Protestant church at the Berlin Cathedral, despite hundreds of opposition pastors denouncing him from their pulpits.
- Luigi Fagioli won the Spanish Grand Prix.
- Born: Ahmad Shah Khan, Crown Prince of Afghanistan, in Kabul, Afghanistan (d. 2024)
- Died: Lucien Gaudin, 47, French Olympic fencing champion

== September 24, 1934 (Monday) ==
- The Detroit Tigers won the American League pennant, their first in 25 years, when the New York Yankees were eliminated by losing to the Boston Red Sox 5–0. The game also proved to be Babe Ruth's last at Yankee Stadium; he drew a walk in the first inning and was replaced by a pinch-runner.
- Born: Tommy Anderson, footballer, in Haddington, Scotland (d. 2018); Robert Lang, actor, in Bristol, England (d. 2004); Princess Maria Pia of Bourbon-Parma, eldest daughter of Umberto II of Italy and Marie José of Belgium, in Naples, Italy

== September 25, 1934 (Tuesday) ==
- Hugh S. Johnson was dismissed as head of the National Recovery Administration.
- King Victor Emmanuel III of Italy announced an amnesty for all Italians imprisoned for two years or less, in celebration of the birth of Princess Maria.
- The New York Yacht Club retained the America's Cup, defeating the Royal Yacht Squadron four races to two.

== September 26, 1934 (Wednesday) ==
- The RMS Queen Mary was launched into the River Clyde at Clydebank in the presence of King George V and the ship's namesake, Queen consort Mary of Teck who launched it.. It was the largest ship in the world at the time.
- Afghanistan was admitted to the League of Nations.
- Died: Alexander Moszkowski, 83, German-Jewish satirist, writer and philosopher

== September 27, 1934 (Thursday) ==
- Former Cuban president Ramón Grau fled the country by plane with seven members of his family. The executive committee of his party, the Partido Auténtico, issued a statement saying it had advised him to leave after receiving reports that he was in personal danger.
- King Alexander of Yugoslavia made an official visit to Bulgaria.
- The first six-man football game was played in Hebron, Nebraska.
- Born: Beverly Armstrong, baseball player, in Maywood, New Jersey (d. 2025); Wilford Brimley, actor, in Salt Lake City, Utah (d. 2020)

== September 28, 1934 (Friday) ==
- The Winwick rail crash killed 11 people in Cheshire, England.
- Limerick defeated Dublin in the rematch of the All-Ireland Senior Hurling Championship Final.
- The Dublin newspaper strike ended after ten weeks.
- Born: Brigitte Bardot, actress, model and animal rights activist, in Paris, France

== September 29, 1934 (Saturday) ==
- The London, Scottish & Provincial Airways Airspeed Courier crash occurred north of Shoreham, Kent, England
- The Mutual Broadcasting System was established.
- The play Merrily We Roll Along by George S. Kaufman and Moss Hart premiered at the Music Box Theatre on Broadway.
- Born: Skandor Akbar, professional wrestler and manager, in Vernon, Texas (d. 2010)
- Born: Mihaly Csikszentmihalyi, a psychologist famous for his Flow theory (d. 2021)
- Died: Archibald Marshall, 68, English author, publisher and journalist

== September 30, 1934 (Sunday) ==
- U.S. President Franklin D. Roosevelt gave a fireside chat titled "On Government and Capitalism".
- The St. Louis Cardinals clinched the National League pennant on the final day of the season when the New York Giants were eliminated by losing to the Brooklyn Dodgers 8–5 in ten innings.
- Babe Ruth played his final game as a Yankee, going 0-for-3 at Griffith Stadium in Washington during a 5–3 loss to the Senators.
- Born: Alan A'Court, footballer, in Rainhill, England (d. 2009); Udo Jürgens, composer and singer, in Klagenfurt, Austria (d. 2014); Anna Kashfi, actress, in Darjeeling, British India (d. 2015)
- Died: Mary Brough, 71, English actress
