= William Gettle =

American businessman

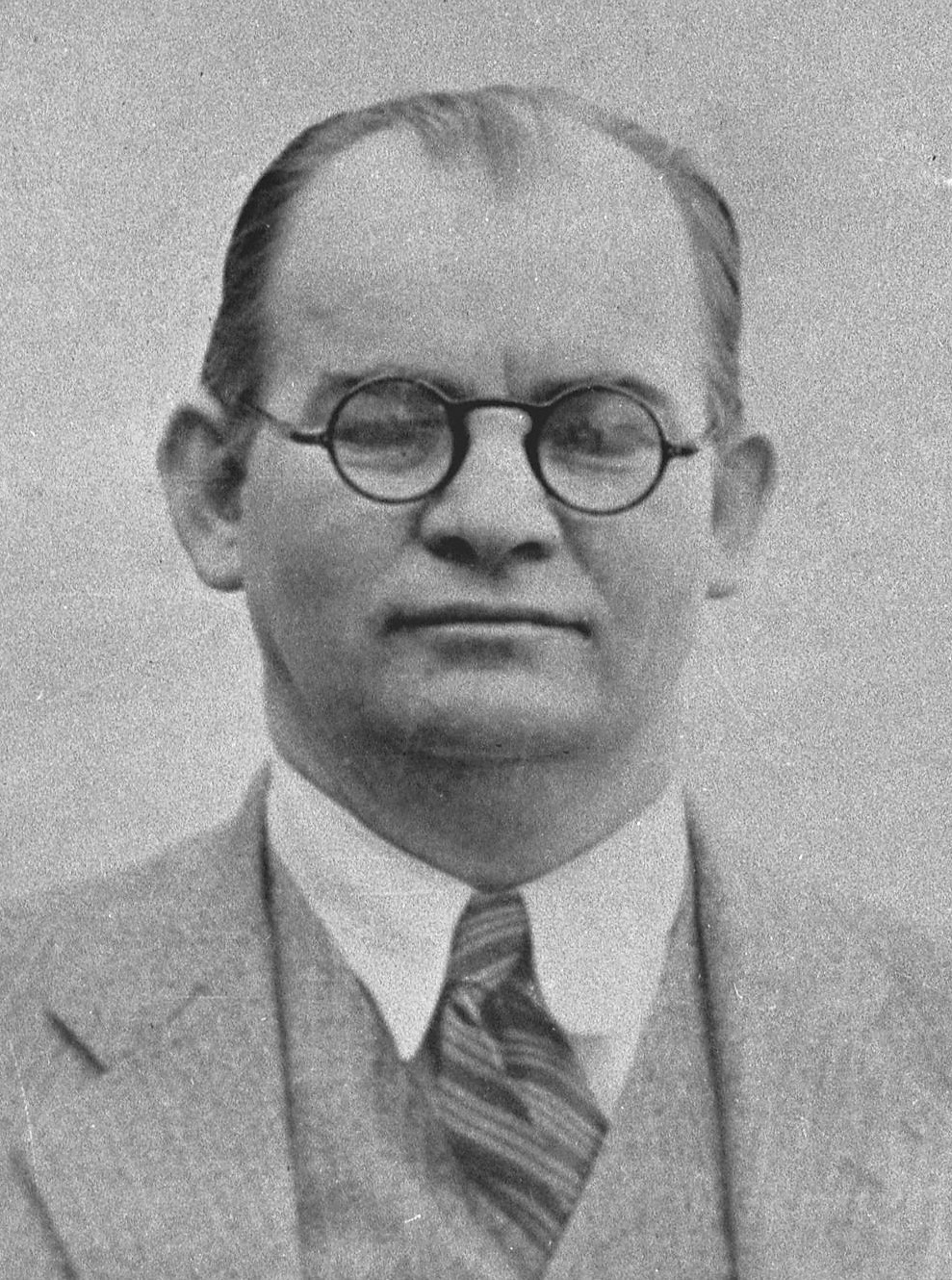
- Gettle in 1934.
- Born: William F. Gettle; 1887; Oklahoma, U.S.
- Died: December 22, 1941 (aged 54); Beverly Hills, California, U.S.
- Occupation: Businessman
- Known for: Being kidnapped in 1934

William F. Gettle (c. 1887 – December 22, 1941) was an American businessman and millionaire. He gained some notoriety when he was kidnapped in 1934.

Gettle was originally from Oklahoma, and moved to Bakersfield, California, in 1915, where he worked for JCPenney and invested in oil fields. The 1920 United States Census showed he was living in Kern, California. At the time of the kidnapping, Gettle weighed 500 pounds, and he and his handicapped wife Fleeta had four children, all of whom were under 10 years of age. One of their neighbors was comedian Joe E. Brown. According to the Los Angeles Times, he was worth around $3,500,000.

== Kidnapping ==
Gettle threw a house-warming party on the evening of May 9, 1934, and was drinking with "a friend named Wolf" in the pool house when two men entered and escorted them out at gunpoint. Gettle was forced into a waiting automobile, and Wolf was left at the scene, tied up but otherwise unharmed.

William Gettle was held, tied up and gagged, in the bedroom of a rented house at 4256 Rosemont Street in La Crescenta, California. He later told police that his kidnappers dressed in bed sheets when talking to him so as not to reveal to him their identities. He also told his rescuers that he "'was not mistreated in any way' by his kidnappers." A ransom of $60,000 was demanded for Gettle's safe release in a note sent to his lawyer; another letter was sent to Fleta Gettle, asking for an additional $40,000. Two police officers, Chester Burris and H.P. Gearhardt, were credited with breaking the case after installing a dictograph in the house of a bank robbery suspect. Overhearing a conversation about Gettle's kidnapping, they were able to trace his whereabouts to the house on Rosemount. A raid was conducted on the house on the night of May 15, 1934. Gettle was recovered the same day as the victim of another high-profile kidnapping case, six-year-old June Robles.

Three men were arrested in connection with the kidnapping, and were eventually convicted after entering guilty pleas in court. They were James Kirk, Larry Kerrigan and Roy Williams. They were all given prison terms in San Quentin. Two women, Loretta Woody and Mona Gallighen, were also arraigned. They were eventually sent to a reformatory in Arlington, Virginia. Clyde Stoddard, the owner of the sedan found in the garage of the Rosemont house, was detained for questioning.

On June 26, just days after his return to safety, Gettle received two letters which threatened to blow up his home unless he paid the senders $6,000. The threat was explained in the letters as 'atonement' for Gettle's testimony against Woody and Gallighen. He received another note, threatening another kidnapping, shortly before Christmas that same year.

== Later life ==
Fourteen months after William's return, Fleeta Gettle died at the age of 34 on July 2, 1935. William F. Gettle died of "chronic liver trouble" at age 54 in his home in Beverly Hills on December 22, 1941.

== See also ==
- List of kidnappings
- Lists of solved missing person cases
