= Nightmare of 1934 =

Painting by Jere Miah II

The Nightmare of 1934
- Artist: Jere Miah II, PWA
- Year: 1934
- Medium: Oil on canvas
- Dimensions: 120 cm × 240 cm (48 in × 96 in)
- Location: Westchester Institute of Fine Arts; Tarrytown, New York

Nightmare of 1934 was the name of a mural painting by mystery artist Jere Miah II that was destroyed by John Smiukse on August 31, 1934. The painting satirized Roosevelt, his cabinet and the New Deal.

== Description ==
At the top of the panel was the great grin of Franklin Delano Roosevelt. On the President's shoulder perched a vulture. In one hand the President held a fishing rod with a sucker on the line, in the other a bouquet of microphones. Mrs. Roosevelt stood beside him, her teeth and chin cruelly caricatured. The New Deal was represented by scattered playing cards—all deuces. Elliott Roosevelt and Anna Roosevelt Dall were seen tossing their respective spouses, portrayed as dolls, into a trash basket. Long lines of green monsters with swollen heads symbolized the Brain Trust. They were dropping gold into troughs at which silk-hatted pigs were feeding. At the lower left Secretary of Agriculture Wallace was strangling the Goddess Ceres. Behind him a tax collector was removing a citizen's shirt. In the centre sat Secretary of the Treasury Morgenthau—a clown juggling money with a lap full of gold bricks. General Hugh S. Johnson was jumping irascibly on the roped figure of Industry. Also to be seen were Madam Secretary Perkins, Postmaster General Farley, Uncle Sam on a cross, dying cattle, silent factories, skulls, reaching arms, and a reformer chasing nudes out of the cinema.

—

The painting hung in the Westchester Institute of Fine Arts in Tarrytown, New York, where the public were charged 25¢ to view it.

== Smiukse ==
Smiukse (b. 1908) was a Latvian who had jumped ship in New York Harbor in 1927 and had been making a living as a house painter in the Bronx. He had heard of the painting and was offended by the inclusion of Eleanor Roosevelt and her children in it.

== Destruction ==
Smiukse, on his day off, calmly went to the gallery, paid his fee, and went in to view the painting. There, in front of a group of housewives, he splashed the painting with paint remover, pulled it off the wall and lit it up. The flames soon went out, but the painting was ruined. He was arrested on the spot. Painter Jonas Lie put up a bail of $500 for Smiuske.

== Sentencing ==
Police Judge William A. H. Ely sentenced John Smiukse to six months in the Westchester County Penitentiary at Eastview for malicious mischief. He was later re-arraigned for illegal entry.

== Publicity ==
The incident can be seen on The March of Time pilot, Pilot Film # 3.
