= June Robles =

Kidnapped American child (1927–2014)

- Born: June Cecilia Robles; June 11, 1927; Tucson, Arizona, U.S.
- Died: September 2, 2014 (aged 87); Tucson, Arizona, U.S.
- Known for: Kidnapping victim
- Parent(s): Fernando and Helen Robles

June Cecilia Robles (June 11, 1927 – September 2, 2014) was a notable kidnapping victim from Tucson, Arizona. Though she survived her ordeal, the person or persons responsible for her abduction were never apprehended.

== Personal life ==
June Robles came from a prominent Tucson family, and was the daughter of Fernando Robles, owner of the Robles Electric Company. Her grandfather, Bernabe Robles, was one of Tucson's wealthiest citizens. Her mother was Helen Robles, and she had one other sister, Sylvia Ann, who was not named in press reports. She was also the niece of Carlos Robles who, at the time of her abduction, was the Assistant County Attorney for Pima County, Arizona, and also a distant relative of U.S. Olympic weightlifter, Sarah Robles. and Dallas architect Celeste Clayton.

== Kidnapping ==
=== Disappearance ===
Six-year-old June was taken by an unidentified man on April 25, 1934 at 3:00 pm. The man was described by witnesses as wearing glasses and as dirty and emaciated. She unwillingly entered the stranger's Ford sedan outside Roskruge School. Witness Marguerite Smith saw the event as she was picking up her son from the school, but assumed it was a family matter and decided not to interfere. June had been walking home from school and was on her way to the home of her aunt, Mrs. Herman F. Kengla, when she was abducted.

=== Ransom ===
At about 5:00 pm that same day, Fernando Robles was handed a note by a child, Rosalio "Goyo" Estrada. The boy had been paid 25 cents by a member of the kidnapping party to deliver the message, which demanded $15,000 for June's safe return. June's father began communicating with his daughter's captor, who identified himself as "Z" in the correspondence. Robles did not immediately go to the police, and it is likely that he would have attempted to negotiate with the culprit, or culprits, on his own.

Very soon, local law enforcement became involved with the case, setting up blockades around Tucson and scouring the area for clues. The case attracted a great amount of media attention and the press dubbed it "the greatest manhunt ever staged in the West." Clyde Barrow was reported as a suspect early in the investigation. The second ransom note reduced the ransom to $10,000 and instructed Robles where to deliver the money. Robles attempted to deliver the money on a specified strip of highway, but no recipients emerged. On April 28, two men in a brown Chevrolet robbed a cafe near Fort Huachuca. In their company was a child said to resemble June Robles. Her father's twin brother, Carlos, very publicly commandeered an airplane in his effort to search for his niece.

On May 7, chief criminal deputy Oliver White announced that June had been found and would be returned to her parents within twenty four hours. This followed the supposed sighting of June in the company of a couple headed for the US–Mexican border and White's subsequent trip to Sonora, Mexico. The announcement turned out to be premature; June was still absent the next day.

== Recovery ==
On May 14, after much searching and scant communication from the abductors, Arizona governor B.B. Moeur received a postcard at his office describing June Robles' location in the desert outside Tucson. The postcard bore a Chicago postmark. A team that included Carlos Robles, Pima County Attorney Clarence Houston, and several highway patrolmen searched the area for two hours before discovering a small metal box, sunk three feet into the ground and disguised with some shrubbery. June was inside, alive and in surprisingly good health, although filthy, blistered by prickly heat and bitten by ants, and her ankles chafed by chains attached to an iron stake after having been chained in the iron box in the desert for 19 days. She said she had subsisted on fruit, bread and jam, potato chips and graham crackers that the kidnappers had left. She had made do with a ceramic pot for a toilet.

As she was escorted away, all she seemed concerned about was her report card, which she had left behind in her underground cell. "I went back and got it," she told The Tucson Daily Citizen. "I wanted my mama to see it."

The kidnapper, or several, responsible for the abduction was never established. Two suspects were brought in for questioning and shown to June, but she was unable to identify either of them. A dance hall proprietor named Oscar 'Buster' Robson was initially charged because of similarities between his handwriting and the "Z" ransom notes. The charges were eventually dismissed. There were allegations that the kidnapping had been an inside job masterminded by a disgruntled relative in Mexico, or by an immediate member of the Robles family, but no evidence could be found to support either of these theories.

== Aftermath ==
June Robles retreated from the media spotlight at the behest of her parents, though Fernando Robles at one point announced that he had accepted an offer to exhibit his daughter in a vaudeville show. Bryan Foy and Sid Grauman both approached Robles, hoping to sign her for personal appearances.

A year and five days after June was recovered, an unnamed dying man came forward with more evidence, implicating three people, and J. Edgar Hoover announced that the case had been solved. However, the deathbed confession did not result in any convictions.

Two and a half years later, the investigation was reopened due to "sensational discoveries." However, no charges were brought against anybody.

For nearly the next 80 years, Robles led a fairly anonymous and routine life, and remained in Tucson. Although the kidnapping was discussed in newspapers and on television on occasion, she never gave any subsequent interviews or wrote any memoirs. A wedding announcement in 1950 did not even mention her ordeal.

She died of complications of Parkinson's disease at age 87 in Tucson on September 2, 2014, with her family placing a paid death notice in the Arizona Daily Star newspaper under her married name, June Birt, on September 5, 2014 David Leighton, a columnist with the Arizona Daily Star, who at the time was working on an article related to her wealthy grandfather Bernabe Robles, learned of her death, but was asked by a family member not to publish information related to her death in his story that was published on September 8, 2014 As a result of this omission, everyone except family and close friends were unaware of her death until three years later when The New York Times learned of her death and published an obituary on October 31, 2017.

== In popular culture ==
A play, June In A Box by Octavio Solis, was based on the Robles kidnapping. It premiered at Intersection for the Arts in San Francisco on March 6, 2008.

== See also ==
- List of kidnappings
- List of solved missing person cases
